= Resacralization of knowledge =

Reversal of the process of rationalization

In traditionalist philosophy, resacralization of knowledge is the reverse of the process of secularization of knowledge. The central premise is that knowledge is intimately connected to its perceived divine source—God or the Ultimate Reality—which has been severed in the modern era. The process of resacralization of knowledge seeks to reinstate the role of intellect—the divine faculty believed to exist in every human being—above and beyond that of reason, as well as to revive the role of traditional metaphysics in acquiring knowledge—especially knowledge of God—by drawing on sacred traditions and sacred science that uphold divine revelations and the spiritual or gnostic teachings of all revealed religions. It aims to restore the primordial connection between God and humanity, which is believed to have been lost. To accomplish this, it relies on the framework of tawhid, which is developed into a comprehensive metaphysical perspective emphasizing the transcendent unity of all phenomena. Iranian philosopher Seyyed Hossein Nasr elaborated on the process of resacralization of knowledge in his book Knowledge and the Sacred, which was presented as Gifford Lectures in 1981.

== Origin ==
The Oxford Encyclopedia of the Modern Islamic World states that Nasr's 1981 Gifford Lectures, which were published under the title Knowledge and the Sacred, reflect "his hope of reviving what he calls the sacred quality of knowledge as opposed to secularized reason". Nasr argues in his Gifford Lectures that the Western intellectual tradition "is in need of a resacralization of knowledge". He contends that Islamic tradition and the "living traditions of the Orient" can aid in revitalizing the Western intellectual tradition because knowledge and the sacred have never been separated in the Orient.

== Background ==
In the Orient knowledge has always been related to the sacred and to spiritual perfection. To know has meant ultimately to be transformed by the very process of knowing, as the Western tradition was also to assert over the ages before it was eclipsed by the postmedieval secularization and humanism that forced the separation of knowing from being and intelligence from the sacred.

— Seyyed Hossein Nasr quoted in Jennifer Kilgore-Caradec, Geoffrey Hill's Serpents and Dragons in Dynamics of Desacralization: Disenchanted Literary Talents, 2015

Nasr and other Traditionalists believe that modernity is an "anomaly" in world history, "a renewed jahilliya" or "an Age of Ignorance," because forgetfulness of the Sacred only occupies the forefront of modern worldviews, despite the fact that such forgetfulness has always been a characteristic of human existence. In the absence of a unifying theological framework, humanity has forgotten the divine roots of "both outer and human nature" and has fallen out of touch with divinity in hitherto unheard-of ways. Nasr emphasizes the "symbolic element of reality" which he believes "has been lost under the literalist reign of modern science". In reference to the Sufi view of the "veil of perception" which is said to conceal the Ultimate Reality, Nasr contends that knowledge of Self and the physical world of modernity is superficial, resulting in "an externalized image away from the cosmic center" because modern civilization confuses the "quantitative accumulation of information" with "qualitative penetration" into the deeper dimensions of reality. Nasr accuses modern sciences of eroding the theological and metaphysical basis of knowledge by generating "the most anthropocentric form of knowledge conceivable", which relies solely on human reason and empirical data to determine the validity of all knowledge. All human sciences, for Nasr, deny the possibility of other orders of reality and, as a result, exclude all other forms of knowing, dismissing the idea that the world's reality extends beyond physical dimensions.

== Predecessors ==
According to Liu Shu-hsien, Nasr claims that when the secularization process appeared to be approaching its natural conclusion in favor of completely removing the influence of the sacred from all areas of human existence and thought, as indicated by Nietzsche's declaration: God is dead; some modern individuals sought to reclaim the sacred. In contrast to the mechanical and rationalistic views of the cosmos and man of individuals such as Bacon, Newton, and Locke, poets such as Goethe, Blake, and Emerson sought to return to a more holistic vision of man and nature. Nasr credits individuals such as A. H. Anquetil Duperron, J. Hammer-Purgstall, and Sir William Jones, as well as Thomas Taylor, Walt Whitman, and the New England Transcendentalists, among others, for paving the way toward the rediscovery of the sacred in the West. However, Nasr claims that they were unable to restore tradition in the West or revive the scientia sacra, which is at the center of all sacred traditions. According to Nasr, the sapiental perspective in the West had become too weak due to the lack of "authentic contact" with the Oriental traditions, which had retained their basic teachings intact in their doctrinal and operational dimensions. For Nasr, it was up to the Orient to revive sapiential tradition in the West through individuals influenced by its light. Nasr mentions Rene Guenon, Ananda K. Coomaraswamy, and Frithjof Schuon among others as having sought to restore the sapiential dimension in the West.

== Frameworks ==
=== Reversal of rationalization ===
According to Steve Yim, resacralization of knowledge for Nasr entails restoring knowledge to its original state prior to the process of secularization. He describes the process of resacralization of knowledge as the process of reviving spiritual and transcendent dimensions of knowledge, which have their origins in divine revelations. Although Nasr believes that Islam is the authentic religion that contains the absolute truth, he also believes in the reality of other "genuine revelations" outside of Islam. Nasr contends, in the spirit of other traditionalist thinkers, that every religious tradition contains the eternal truth of God. All religions are united in the fact that they all have their origins in the Absolute, which is both truth and reality and the source of all revelations and truth. According to this perspective, knowledge that is not accompanied with a sense of the divine cannot be regarded as true knowledge.

One key aspect of this undertaking is to reverse the process whereby desacralized reason has been brought to bear on sacred traditions and then to revive an awareness of the sacred quality of knowledge. Such sacred knowledge, according to [Nasr], is not the exclusive preserve of Islam, but is to be found wherever there is fidelity to the sacred origin of any revealed tradition. Therefore, he asserts that while traditional Islam provides the structure for assimilating the sacred, that which is traditional in other religions also offers an appropriate structure. Even though it differs out-wardly from Islam, it gives access to the sacred in itself, which is one with Islam in its essence.

— Haifaa Jawad, Seyyed Hossein Nasr and the Study of Religion in Contemporary Society, 2005

In opposition to supposed reductionist tendencies of modern human sciences, Nasr contends that the sapiential tradition of world religions provides a comprehensive account of the hierarchy of knowledge that correlates to different orders of reality. While the natural and social sciences are said to confine legitimate knowledge to a rationalist interpretation of the physical realm, which has allegedly given rise to an analytical and compartmentalized view of the universe, a holistic perspective of knowledge is believed to be founded on intellect and reason, i. e., on both intuition and reason. For Nasr, "knowledge extends in hierarchy from an empirical and rational mode of knowing to the highest form of knowledge" which he terms as the "unitive knowledge" or al-ma'rifah. Nasr emphasizes over and again that the knowledge to which the Quran alludes to is placed inside a sacred framework, just as previous Islamic sciences were constrained by a metaphysical framework of the harmony and complete order of the cosmos. Knowledge thus must be reconstructed in terms of both a true metaphysics of God's essence and a science of the revealed cosmic order, which points to a higher order of reality. The process of resacralization necessitates the restoration of the place of the intellect above and beyond the place of reason, in order for mankind to reestablish connection with God, and the relative with the Absolute. Since the intellect is capable of knowing the Absolute, it must serve as the foundation for a resacralized paradigm of knowledge. According to Nasr, "the ground of the intellect is the Divine and so is its ultimate goal". It is a "divine spark" within humans, which emanates from the "Divine Light". While "the Intellect shines within the being of man", he is "too far removed from his primordial nature" or fitra. As a result, he is not capable of fully utilizing this gift without assistance. The assistance comes in the form of revelation, which is necessary for the intellect to function properly and be fully realized.

With the recognition of the anthropocentric nature of modern knowledge, the reconstruction of knowledge must re-turn to the concept of tawhid to reveal the underlying "unity and interrelatedness of all that exists". Tawhid, in the first instance a theological notion referring to the strict unity and oneness of God, is here elaborated into a comprehensive metaphysical perspective of the unity of all phenomena. So, while it may be tempting to view the emphasis on tawhid as a nostalgic return to the undifferentiated unity of pre-modern times, Nasr's conception of re-turning to tawhid is one of rediscovering the primordial bond between God and humanity that has been severed. The reconstruction of knowledge within the framework of tawhid amounts, therefore, to a re-enchantment of the world, a re-sacralization, a reversal of the process of rationalization, the Entzauberungprozess.

— Ali Zaidi, Muslim Reconstructions of Knowledge: The Cases of Nasr and al-Faruqi, 2011

Zaidi presents Nasr's idea of resacralisation of knowledge as the polar opposite of Weber's Entzauberungprozess. He quotes Nasr as saying that "Certainly my goal is to move in the opposite direction than what Max Weber called the Entzauberungprozess". Nasr's appeal to intuition as the foundation of knowledge stems from his belief that intuitive or sapiential knowledge fosters an intimate relationship between the knower, the act of knowing, and the object to be known. Nasr therefore broadens the idea of tawhid from its narrow orthodox view of God's unity to the Unity of Being. The concept of tawhid here has implications on both the ontological and epistemological levels, since it eliminates the subject-object duality that lies at the heart of the post-Enlightenment paradigm of thought. According to Nasr, rationality without intuition along with the idea of the knowing subject separated from the known object cause us to become preoccupied with the particular, relative, and ephemeral or the Universal, Absolute, and Eternal, without really being able to correlate the two. According to Nasr, the process of knowledge reconstruction must call into question not just the ontological status of physical reality, but also the epistemological validity of the knowledge that purports to explain that reality. Nasr's reconstruction thus seeks to utilise metaphysics as a "necessary reversal" of modernity's rationalization process.

=== Revival of Tradition ===
According Jane I. Smith, Nasr seeks to restore the sacred quality of knowledge by reversing the process by which "secularized reason has been brought to bear on sacred traditions." For Nasr, the resuscitation of Tradition is vital to resacralizing knowledge, because "a de-traditionalized world cannot manifest the sacred", nor can modern science, or the modern world in general, transcend its inherent flaws, and because "The rediscovery of the sacred is ultimately and inextricably related to the revival of tradition". For Nasr and other traditionalists, Tradition centers on the Divine or the Sacred. It specifically refers to the "transmission of sapiential knowledge found in the spiritual, esoteric, or Gnostic traditions in each of the World Religions, a knowledge that recognizes the sacred and divine origin of the cosmos".

In response to the crisis of modernity, which, according to the Traditionalist view, is caused by modern science and its secular worldview, Nasr suggests that a return to tradition is the only way to bring about the rediscovery of Sacred knowledge, which has been obscured by secular science. In this sense, tradition lies at the heart of every revelation and is the center of the circle, which encompasses and defines tradition.

— Seyedamirhossein Asghari, Sufism and Challenges of Modern and Secular Philosophy: Nasr's Perspective, 2021

The Dictionary of Literary Biography also describes Nasr's response to the issue of desacralization of knowledge as a return to tradition, which entails "truths or principles of a divine origin revealed or unveiled to mankind and, in fact, a whole cosmic sector through various figures envisaged as messengers, prophets, avataras, the Logos or other transmitting agencies" as well as their implications in various domains of human life and thought. Ernest Wolf-Gazo asserts that "In Nasr's universe of discourse the concepts of revelation, unity, origin, source, tradition, perennial wisdom, sophia, and intellectual intuition of God are interrelated like a cobweb." He views the recovery or rediscovery of man's intellect, which is "the fundamental insight of humankind," as the ultimate goal of "the reenchantment project." This intellect is "the instrument of knowledge within man" and "is endowed with the possibility of knowing the Absolute." According to Gai Eaton, instead of theoretic knowledge, Nasr places his emphasis on "realized" knowledge. For Nasr, "The unknown is not out there, beyond the present boundary of knowledge, but at the Center of man's being here and now where it has always been". The only reason humans are unaware of it is because they have forgotten that it exists. Nasr compares such knowledge with a sun that keeps shining despite the fact that humans can no longer see its light due to their blindness. This knowledge can only be attained through "the acquisition of spiritual virtues, which is the manner in which man participates in that truth which is itself suprahuman". Such realized knowledge is never divorced or disconnected from revelation, religion, tradition and orthodoxy.

=== Resacralization of science ===
According to Daiwie Fu, Nasr's call for the resacralization of science is "gnosis-oriented". Scholars such as Seyyed Hossein Nasr, Alparslan Açkgenç, and Osman Bakar maintain that religion and science cannot be reconciled without changing the philosophical foundations of modern science, because modern science is essentially secular and therefore responsible for desacralizing the universe. Nasr, along with members of the Traditionalist School such as Frithjof Schuon, René Guénon, and Titus Burckhardt, contends that the premodern and modern sciences differ in their conceptions of nature, methods, cosmological presuppositions, epistemological perspective, and the parametric structure used to process the "facts" discovered through observation and experimentation. According to Kathleen Raine, Nasr does not oppose "science itself, as such and within its own field", but rather scientism, which Gai Eaton defines "as the whole body of thought and speculation constructed upon the working theories whereby scientists attempt to coordinate their observations and to explain rationally a phenomenal world to which they do not possess the key".

==== Revival of the sacred view of sciences ====
In order to overcome the perceived constraints of modern science, Traditionalists argue for the resuscitation of "the traditional sacred outlook of sciences", without subscribing to the metaphysical principles of modern science. According to Nasr, the primary distinction between traditional science and modern science is that, in the former, the profane and purely human remain constantly marginal and the sacred is central, whereas, in the latter, the profane has taken center stage. For this reason, despite the fact that certain intuitions and discoveries made possible by modern science reveal the Divine Origin of the natural world, it has been so marginalized that it is hardly acknowledged. Thus, traditionalists propose that the modern worldview be deconstructed by altering the foundational assumptions about the nature of reality, which are believed to be governed by the prevailing "dualist-mechanistic-anthropocentric paradigm". In Nasr's view, science is hierarchical, or subservient to a higher order. According to this perspective, modern science is deficient because it only addresses some aspects of reality while dismissing others. Traditional sciences, on the other hand, maintain the "hierarchy of realities, the primacy of the spiritual over the material, the sacred character of the cosmos, and the unity of knowledge and interrelatedness of beings." Epistemologically, such science is based on revelation, intellect, and reason.

For Nasr, science should operate within the limits set by metaphysics, the ultimate science. He is concerned that placing religion under the authority of a secularized science will lead to the desacralization of religion itself. As a traditionalist, he believes that religious forms are sacred revelations rather than human constructions, and hence not subject to rational or scientific criticism… Nasr's theology of science corresponds with his doctrine of God insofar as he envisions metaphysics resacralizing science by surrounding and permeating it in an "all‐encompassing" way; metaphysics should also control and have power over science, like its king.

— Ian S. Mevorach, The Divine Environment (al-Muhit) and the Body of God: Seyyed Hossein Nasr and Sallie McFague Resacralize Nature, 2017

Nasr thus seeks to reinstate "the traditional hierarchy of metaphysics over physics". He condemns any attempt to combine science and religion in such a way that religion conforms to modern scientific theories. Traditional religion, in his opinion, must not be influenced by modern science; rather, modern science should be placed in its appropriate perspective and, if required, corrected by traditional metaphysics. Nasr believes that the only way to counteract scientism, which he predicts will gain strength as scientific applications in the form of technology continue to undermine the sanctity of the human person while also hastening ecological degradation of the planet, is through sacred science, which upholds the hierarchy of knowledge and sapiential teachings of the world religions.

== Effects ==
The resacralization of knowledge is said to have the potential to reconnect man with the divine. Because, according to Nasr, the intellective or intuitive perception of higher orders of reality is ultimately what permits Man to know God. According to Nasr, the rediscovery of the sacred dimension of knowledge would cast fresh light on Greek wisdom, the wisdom of Plato, Plotinus, and other Graeco-Alexandrian sages as well as teachings such as Hermeticism, not as mere "human philosophy" but as sacred teachings of divine inspiration comparable to Hindu darśanas rather than modern philosophical schools of today. In this regard, Nasr points to "the belief of Muslim philosophers that the Greek philosophers had learned their doctrines from the prophets", particularly Solomon, and that "philosophy derives from the niche of prophecy". Nasr argues that this claim, while historically unverifiable, embodies a fundamental truth, namely the connection of their philosophical wisdom to the sacred and its foundation in revelation, even though this revelation is distinct from that of Abrahamic religions.

== Reception ==
According to Nidhal Guessoum, the concepts of God's "robust unity" and the function of intuitive knowledge bring nothing new to our understanding of scientific processes. He believes that deconstructing science in order to resacralize it is unnecessary because the ultimate objective is to reconcile "religious tradition with rational and scientific modernity." Likewise, Mehdi Golshani claims that Nasr's metaphysical objections are unnecessary since "science and metaphysics are complementary rather than contradictory." Sacralization initiatives, according to Syed Farid Alatas, do not provide alternatives to modernist discourse. However, Ernest Wolf-Gazo sees a possibility of reconciling Nasr's philosophy with the Western tradition, if positive worldviews in this regard can be reconstructed, taking into account the philosophies of figures such as Plato, Plotinus, Meister Eckhart, Cusanas, Spinoza, Goethe and German romantics such as Novalis, Schlegel, Schelling and Steffen. Then it might become possible to see that intellectual intuition of God is quite legitimate even within the Western tradition. For Wolf-Gazo, the reconstruction must be carried out in such a way that the Neo-Platonic tradition and the nominalists of late medieval philosophy, from Ockham to the analytic schools, from Newton to Whitehead, may be reconciled.

== Other scholarly trends ==
=== Maslow's resacralization ===
According to the American psychologist Abraham Maslow (1966), the desacralization of science has produced "the type of science that lacks emotion, joy, wonder, awe, and rapture." Thus, he embraced the concept of a scientific ethos that is founded on "a humanistic, holistic approach that is not value free and that has scientists who care about the people and topics they investigate." He encouraged scientists to reintroduce values, creativity, emotion, and ritual to their work. In order to accomplish this, science needs to be resacralized, which entails infusing it with ceremony, fervor, and human values.

=== Wexler's resacralization of research ===
The educational sociologist Philip Wexler argues that the social sciences and education should no longer take secularization for granted because we have now reached a post-secular era that demands a "religious turn" and a "re-sacralization of research". In order to accomplish this, scholars may need to reexamine early sociological works by Weber, Durkheim, Eliade, and others not only for their relevance but also for their shortcomings in contemporary analysis. Resacralization, in this view, entails more than simply returning to religion; rather, it requires a reconstruction of social life that recognizes the continued significance of religion and the potential value of looking at it from a religious perspective.

== See also ==
- Fitra
- Dhikr
- Pontifical and Promethean man

== Sources ==
- Alatas, Syed Farid (1995). "The Sacralization of the Social Sciences : a Critique of an Emerging Theme in Academic Discourse / La Sacralisation des sciences sociales : la critique d'une nouvelle notion dans le discours académique". Archives de sciences sociales des religions (in French). 91 (1). PERSEE Program: 89–111. doi:10.3406/assr.1995.996. ISSN 0335-5985. S2CID 144680307.
- Alkatiri, Wardah (2016). "In Search of Suitable Knowledge: The Need of Ontological Epistemological Pluralism". International Journal of the Asian Philosophical Association. 9 (2): 197–230.
- Allen, Micheal (2003). "Seyyed Hossein Nasr". In Dematteis, Philip B.; McHenry, Leemon B. (eds.). Dictionary of Literary Biography. Gale. ISBN 978-0787660239.
- Asghari, Seyedamirhossein (2021). "Sufism and Challenges of Modern and Secular Philosophy: Nasr's Perspective". Türk Kültürü ve Hacı Bektaş Veli Araştırma Dergisi. 98. Ankara Haci Bayram Veli Universitesi: 245–258. doi:10.34189/hbv.98.011. ISSN 1306-8253. S2CID 236383700.
- Burrel, David (2000). "Islamic Philosophical Theology". In Hahn, Lewis Edwin; Auxier, Randall E.; Stone Jr., Lucian W. (eds.). The Philosophy of Seyyed Hossein Nasr. Open Court. ISBN 978-0812694147.
- Burke, K.J.; Segall, A. (2016). Christian Privilege in U.S. Education: Legacies and Current Issues. Studies in Curriculum Theory Series. Taylor & Francis. ISBN 978-1-317-23247-6.
- Daiwie, Fu (2000). "Irfan Habib and Dhruv Raina (eds.), Situating the History of Science: Dialogues with Joseph Needham". East Asian Science, Technology, and Medicine. 17 (1). Brill: 142–147. doi:10.1163/26669323-01701010. ISSN 1562-918X.
- Derichs, C. (2017). Knowledge Production, Area Studies and Global Cooperation. Routledge Global Cooperation Series. Taylor & Francis. ISBN 978-1-317-28207-5.
- Eaton, Gai (1983). "Knowledge and the Sacred: Reflections on Seyyed Hossein Nasr's Gifford Lectures". Studies in Comparative Religion. 15 (3–4). Archived from the original on 2020-10-26.
- Feist, J.; Feist, G.; Roberts, T.A. (2014). Ebook: Theories of Personality. UK Higher Education Psychology Psychology. McGraw-Hill Education. ISBN 978-0-07-717187-2.
- Kilgore-Caradec, Jennifer (2015). "Geoffrey Hill's Serpents and Dragons". Dynamics of Desacralization: Disenchanted Literary Talents. Göttingen: V&R Unipress. pp. 151–162. doi:10.14220/9783737003865.151. ISBN 978-3-8471-0386-8.
- Smith, Jane I. (1995). "Nasr, Seyyed Hossein". The Oxford Encyclopedia of the Modern Islamic World. Oxford University Press.
- Smith, Jane I. (1991). "Seyyed Hossein Nasr: Defender of the Sacred and Islamic Traditionalism". The Muslims of America. Religion in America series The Muslims of America. Oxford University Press, USA. ISBN 978-0-19-802317-3.
- Heer, Nicholas (1993). "Book Reviews: Knowledge and the Sacred". Philosophy East and West. 43 (1): 144–150. doi:10.2307/1399476. JSTOR 1399476.
- Jawad, Haifaa (2005). "Seyyed Hossein Nasr and the Study of Religion in Contemporary Society". American Journal of Islam and Society. 22 (2): 49–68. doi:10.35632/ajis.v22i2.457.
- Koca, Özgür (2020). "Islamic Theories of Causality in the Modern Context: The Religion and Science Debate". Islam, Causality, and Freedom. Cambridge University Press. doi:10.1017/9781108866965. ISBN 978-1-108-86696-5. S2CID 243456327.
- Mevorach, Ian S. (2017). "The Divine Environment (al-Muhit) and the Body of God: Seyyed Hossein Nasr and Sallie McFague Resacralize Nature". The Wiley Blackwell Companion to Religion and Ecology. Chichester, UK: John Wiley & Sons, Ltd. ISBN 9781118465561.
- Mevorach, Ian (2015). In search of a Christian-Muslim common path from desacralization to resacralization of nature: Sallie McFague and Seyyed Hossein Nasr on the ecological crisis (PhD Dissertation). Boston University.
- Nasr, Seyyed Hossein (2001). "God: The Reality to Serve, Love and Know". Iqbal Review. 42 (2): 6–32.
- Neville, R.C.; Smith, J.Z. (2001a). Religious Truth: A Volume in the Comparative Religious Ideas Project. SUNY Series, The Comparative Religious Ideas Project. State University of New York Press. ISBN 978-0-7914-4778-9.
- Neville, R.C.; Smith, J.Z. (2001). Religious Truth: A Volume in the Comparative Religious Ideas Project. State University of New York Press. ISBN 978-0-7914-4777-2.
- Raine, Kathleen (1983). "Resacralization [Review of Knowledge and the Sacred]". Temonos. 4: 192–196.
- Saltzman, Judy D. (2000). "The Concept of Spiritual Knowledge in the Philosophy of Seyyed Hossein Nasr". In Hahn, Lewis Edwin; Auxier, Randall E.; Stone Jr., Lucian W. (eds.). The Philosophy of Seyyed Hossein Nasr. Open Court. ISBN 978-0812694147.
- Shu-hsien, Liu (2000). "Reflections on Tradition and Modernity: A Response to Seyyed Hossein Nasr from Neo-Confucian Perspective". In Hahn, Lewis Edwin; Auxier, Randall E.; Stone Jr., Lucian W. (eds.). The Philosophy of Seyyed Hossein Nasr. Open Court. ISBN 978-0812694147.
- Wolf-Gazo, Ernest (2000). "Nasr and the Quest for the Sacred". In Hahn, Lewis Edwin; Auxier, Randall E.; Stone Jr., Lucian W. (eds.). The Philosophy of Seyyed Hossein Nasr. Open Court. ISBN 978-0812694147.
- Yim, Steve (2020). "Reforming the Islamic Intellectuality :'Re-sacralization of Knowledge' in Seyyed Hossein Nasr's Thought". Muslim-Christian Encounter. 13 (1). Torch Trinity Center for Islamic Studies: 53–85. doi:10.30532/mce.2020.13.1.53. ISSN 1976-8117. S2CID 219108983.
- Zaidi, Ali (2011). "Muslim Reconstructions of Knowledge: The Cases of Nasr and al-Faruqi". Islam, Modernity, and the Human Sciences. New York: Palgrave Macmillan US. pp. 53–80. doi:10.1057/9780230118997_3. ISBN 978-1-349-29281-3.
