= Resacralization =

Reviving of religion or spirituality

Resacralization is the process of reviving religion or restoring spiritual meanings to various domains of life and thought. It has been termed as the "alter ego" of secularization, which is "a theory claiming that religion loses its holds in modern society". The term rescralization has a variety of connotations in sociology of religion and "very largely draws its meaning" from secularization thesis. According to this viewpoint, religion and spiritual values continue to play an important role in both the private and public realms. Empirical evidence suggests that the world is undergoing a rescralization since religions are gaining ground in contemporary social and political spheres.

== Causes ==
The idea of rescralization has been used to challenge the Weberian presumption that modernization inevitably breeds disenchantment and secular values and, in the end, harms religion. This point of view contends that modernity, rather than eliminating religion, creates new possibilities for its revival in a variety of fields. "The most salient cause of rescralisation", according to The SAGE Encyclopedia of the Sociology of Religion, "is precisely what was supposed to eradicate religion: the social, economic, and cultural modernisation that swept across the world". In a world where "traditional and local knowledge and systems of authority are disrupted and society becomes ever more complex", individuals seek rescralization because they "need new sources of identity and new forms of stable community to provide them with a sense of meaning and purpose".

== Aspects ==
=== Resacralization of knowledge ===
In traditionalist philosophy, resacralization of knowledge is the reverse of the process of secularization of knowledge. The central premise is that knowledge is intimately connected to its perceived divine source—God or the Ultimate Reality—which has been severed in the modern era. The process of resacralization of knowledge seeks to reinstate the role of intellect—the divine faculty believed to exist in every human being—above and beyond that of reason, as well as to revive the role of traditional metaphysics in acquiring knowledge—especially knowledge of God—by drawing on sacred traditions and sacred science that uphold divine revelations and the spiritual or gnostic teachings of all revealed religions. It aims to restore the primordial connection between God and humanity, which is believed to have been lost. To accomplish this, it relies on the framework of tawhid, which is developed into a comprehensive metaphysical perspective emphasizing the transcendent unity of all phenomena. Iranian philosopher Seyyed Hossein Nasr elaborated on the process of resacralization of knowledge in his book Knowledge and the Sacred, which was presented as Gifford Lectures in 1981.

=== Resacralization of nature ===
Resacralization of nature is a term used in environmental philosophy to describe the process of restoring the sacred quality of nature. The primary assumption is that nature has a sanctified aspect that has become lost in modern times as a result of the secularization of contemporary worldviews. These secular worldviews are said to be directly responsible for the spiritual crisis in "modern man", which has ultimately resulted in the current environmental degradation. This perspective emphasizes the significance of changing human perceptions of nature through the incorporation of various religious principles and values that connect nature with the divine. The Iranian philosopher Seyyed Hossein Nasr first conceptualized the theme of resacralization of nature in contemporary language, which was later expounded upon by a number of theologians and philosophers including Alister McGrath, Sallie McFague and Rosemary Radford Ruether.

== See also ==
- Desecularization
