= Pontifical and Promethean man =

Traditionalist concept

In traditionalist philosophy, pontifical man (Note: On the usage of the term "man", Nasr writes: "By man is meant not the male alone but the human state whose archetypal reality is the androgyne reflected in both the male and female. Man in English signifies at once the male and the human being as such like the Greek anthrōpos, the German mensch or the Arabic insān. There is no need to torture the natural structure of the English language to satisfy current movements which consider the use of the term “man” as a sexist bias, forgetting the second meaning of the term as anthrōpos.") is a divine representative (vicegerent of God) who serves as a bridge between heaven and earth. Promethean man, on the other hand, sees himself as an earthly being who has rebelled against God and has no knowledge of his origins or purposes. This concept was notably developed in contemporary language by the Iranian philosopher Seyyed Hossein Nasr.

== Symbolism ==
Nasr used the term pontifical in its etymological sense to convey that the human being is the gateway between Heaven and Earth, living on a circle of which he is always conscious and to which he strives to reach in his life. For Nasr, the pontifex (see also the ancient Pontifex Maximus) is the sacred human that connects the physical and spiritual realms, whereas Prometheus is the "profane man," the robber of fire from the dwelling of the gods. Nasr used the Prometheus image differently from Aeschylus in Prometheus Bound and Shelley in Prometheus Unbound. In legends, Prometheus is portrayed as a hero, a demigod, or Titan prepared to endure endless torment to impart light to an ignorant and suffering humanity, even if it means defying the divine authority. In Nasr's perspective, however, the symbolism acquires a new meaning. Prometheus is portrayed as a thief of celestial fire, a rebel against the Divine, and a man who has lost sight of his purpose.

Gai Eaton, commenting on Nasr's views of humanity, says that Pontifex is a notion that is similar to the khalifat fi l-arḍ or "[divinely-appointed] vicegerent on Earth" and symbolizes the same underlying premise. On the other hand, the Prometheus myth reflects Western man's perception of himself as a "little god", who takes pride in taking that which does not belong to him from heaven, disobeying the divine authority.

== History ==
According to David Burrell, Nasr regards Promethean man as a product of the thirteenth-century Aristotelianization of Western philosophy, which some attribute to Averroes. (Note: David Burrell: "This sense of what it is to be human is contrasted with the "Promethean man [who] is a creature of this world" and a product of the "excessively rigid Aristotelianization of Western thought in the thirteenth century identified by some with Averroes.") For Nasr, the Promethean man, who is a self centered being, emerged during the Renaissance as a reaction against the traditional understanding of pontifical man. This event is said to correspond with the definitive loss of the sacred character of the universe. (Note: Giovanni Monastra: "The rise of the Promethean, individualistic man in the Renaissance coincided with the decisive loss of sacredness of the universe, while Christianity became more and more oriented toward a radical transcendentalism, where God was seen, especially in Protestant thought, as the only source of activity and nature was reduced to a simply passive reality." Nicholas Heer: "The concept of Promethean man, Nasr states, first developed in the Renaissance as a revolt against the traditional concept of pontifical man.") Nasr argues that the "exteriorization" of Christian philosophy was reinforced in the seventeenth century by the secularization of cosmological science, which was itself a consequence of "naturalization" of Christian conception of man as a satisfied citizen of this world.

For Nasr, the secularization of science in the seventeenth century mechanized both the notion of the universe and the notion of man, resulting in a world where man was an alien. He argues that the scientism that evolved during this century, along with the seeming success of Newtonian physics, culminated in the establishment of human sciences, which to this day resemble an already obsolete physics. Nasr agrees with Gilbert Durand's notion of "the disfiguration of the image of man in the West" in developing the picture of Promethean humanity. He distinguishes the "proto-Nietzschean construction" of man from the "primordial and plenary nature of man that Islam calls the 'Universal or Perfect Man' (al-Insan al-kamil) and to which the sapiental doctrines of Graeco-Alexandrian antiquity also allude,"—a man "who is the mirror of the divine qualities and names and the prototype of creation".

== Polemics ==
Traditionalism maintains that the anthropology of modernity is 'Promethean' in nature, which has left the "humanum" alone in a meaningless cosmos. For Traditionalists, this is an illusory depiction of man that deviates from the essence of recurring divine revelations. They argue in favor of "pontifical man", a perspective that sees the human as the link between heaven and earth. (Note: Damian Howard: "Modernity's anthropology is ‘Promethean’ according to Traditionalism, even though, far from empowering man, the Darwinian theory which is now associated with it tends to set the humanum adrift in a meaningless universe. The Traditionalists demand the rejection of this illusory depiction in favour of ‘pontifical man’, a view which locates the human as the bridge between heaven and earth. This is shown to be the content of repeated divine revelations, a unanimous record from which only modernity deviates.") Nasr contrasts the notion of the pontifical human with that of the modern man. For him, a "pontifical man" is traditional, spiritual, and religious. Modern humans, on the other hand, are promethean beings, who, according to Nasr, deny the existence of God. A Promethean person is irreligious and materialistic in both his or her beliefs and actions.

To characterize modernity’s secularization of the universe, Nasr borrows from Greek mythology. Like Prometheus, man has revolted against the heavens. ...The Promethean model, in contradistinction to what he terms “Pontifical Man” – the understanding that mankind is the lynchpin between the cosmos and the Sacred – is both unethical and sacrilegious. Moreover it is recklessly leading to the current erosion of our environment.

— Lucian W. Stone Jr., Dictionary of Modern American Philosophers, 2005

According to Liu Shu-hsien, Nasr sees Promethean man as a creature of this world who has revolted against Heaven. He "feels at home on earth" and perceives life as a large "marketplace" where he is free to explore and choose whatever he wants. He is submerged in transience and impermanence, having lost his sense of the sacred, and has become a slave of his nafs or lower self, which he considers as liberty. According to this understanding, Promethean man stands against the sacred tradition. Pontifical man, on the contrary, connects the terrestrial and celestial realms. For Nasr, such a man never forgets that he is God's viceroy (khalifat Allah), who exists in a world that he recognizes as having an origin and a center, whose "primordial purity and wholeness he seeks to emulate, recapture and transmit". Pontifical man recognizes his divine responsibilities as a mediator between heaven and earth, as well as "his entelechy as lying beyond the terrestrial domain over which he is allowed to rule provided he remains aware of the transient nature of his own journey on earth", whereas Promethean man rejects this function and declares independence from the divine.

For Nasr, man's pontifical essence transcends him if he remains true to himself. Man cannot go against his inner essence unless he pays the price of separation from all he is and everything he wishes to be. With his roots in transcendental reality, man has an insatiable desire to be reborn in the spiritual realm with its limitless possibilities, free of the constraints of contingency and finiteness that encircle him. Being human, as Nasr argues, includes a desire to be more than just a human. Hence he has a spiritual longing for the Absolute and the Perennial. A pontifical man is destined to know the absolute and to live in accordance with the will of the Heaven. The Promethean man, on the other hand, is a weak and forgetful individual who succumbs to the spell of the secular and material world. He separates himself from the cosmic and immutable archetypes and becomes completely terrestrial. He loses his actual path in the world by accepting the changing aspects of things as the sole aspects of reality. Such a man thinks he can "live on a circle without a center", while trying "to misappropriate the role of the Divinity for himself". He represents a shift from the viewpoint of man being created in the image of God to God being created in the image of man. Oblivious to his origin and purpose, Promethean man has caused havoc on the world over the course of five centuries, disrupting the natural order, and has lost sight of what it actually means to be a human, because he only seeks to achieve perfection by reforming his earthly finite existence.

In contrast, pontifical man is aware that, exactly because he is human, everything he does and thinks has both grandeur and peril. He knows that his activities have an impact on his existence that extends beyond the constrained spatiotemporal settings in which they take place. He understands "that somehow the bark which is to take him to the shore beyond after that fleeting journey" is made of what he achieves and how he lives while in the human realm. Pontifical man is both the mirror of the center on the periphery and the echo of the Origin in subsequent cycles of time and generations of human history. According to the traditional perspective, this center is eternally existent inside man himself. Because Eternity is mirrored in the present now, "Pontifical man" has access to the eternal while being outwardly in the province of becoming. He fulfills his full human potential since he possesses a true intellect.

== Epistemological perspective ==
According to Mehdi Aminrazavi, the Promethean and Pontifical man symbolize two distinct "modes of being", each with its own method of cognition. Promethean man, according to Nasr, is the outcome of pure informative or discursive knowledge, whereas pontifical man is the reflection of transformative or realized knowledge. The Promethean man rejects tradition in favor of pure "rational thought." The Pontifical man, on the other hand, relies on esoteric method which is bound by religious law, and which the Promethean man seeks to deconstruct and annihilate. For Pontifical man, only realized knowledge of Reality can alleviate man's unrest and inner disquiet and restore the tranquility and calm that can only be attained by devotion to one's own Divine nature.

Modern science, according to Nasr, has embraced the "Promethean perspective of man," which sees man as "the measure of all things" in comparison to the Pontifical man, who lives in a theocentric universe. Modernism rejects such theocentric views of reality, removing God from the center of existence and substituting God with man. Instead, it focuses on the individual and individualism, as well as human reason and the senses. Its epistemology, Nasr argues, is mostly based on rationalism or empiricism, and it evaluates everything using human values as the ultimate standard. Traditional science, on the other hand, incorporates metaphysical principles and is theocentric, or God-centered.

For Nasr, man is greater than what science has discovered about him, and he is neither angel nor animal in the ultimate sense. His intellect, psyche, and spirit have bestowed upon him qualities and characteristics that far exceed the greatest aspirations of the scientific community. According to Sulayman S. Nyang, Nasr sees man as a "pontifical being", yearning for a meeting with the source of his life and existence. He refuses to "enclose" man within the biological framework of Darwinian theory. He claims that the source of man is not the atoms from which he is formed. Man is rather a metaphysical and transcendental entity whose existence is beyond human comprehension, despite the fact that signs of his presence and existence can be found everywhere.

== See also ==
- Nasr's ideas:
  - Desacralization of knowledge
  - Resacralization of knowledge
  - Resacralization of nature
  - Scientia sacra
- Playing God (ethics)
- Parson-naturalist
- Fitra

== Sources ==
- Aminrazavi, Mehdi (2000). "Philosophia Perennis and Scientia Sacra in a Postmodern World". In Hahn, Lewis Edwin; Auxier, Randall E.; Stone Jr., Lucian W. (eds.). The Philosophy of Seyyed Hossein Nasr. Open Court. ISBN 978-0812694147.
- Burrel, David (2000). "Islamic Philosophical Theology". In Hahn, Lewis Edwin; Auxier, Randall E.; Stone Jr., Lucian W. (eds.). The Philosophy of Seyyed Hossein Nasr. Open Court. ISBN 978-0812694147.
- Eaton, Gai (1983). "Knowledge and the Sacred: Reflections on Seyyed Hossein Nasr's Gifford Lectures". Studies in Comparative Religion. 15 (3–4). Archived from the original on 2020-10-26.
- Fatemi, S.M. (2021). The Psychology of Inner Peace: Discovering Heartfulness. Cambridge University Press. ISBN 978-1-108-48950-8.
- Monastra, Giovanni (2000). "Seyyed Hossein Nasr: Religion, Nature, and Science". In Hahn, Lewis Edwin; Auxier, Randall E.; Stone Jr., Lucian W. (eds.). The Philosophy of Seyyed Hossein Nasr. Open Court. ISBN 978-0812694147.
- Hashemi, M. (2017). Theism and Atheism in a Post-Secular Age. Springer International Publishing. ISBN 978-3-319-54948-4.
- Heer, Nicholas (1993). "Book Reviews: Knowledge and the Sacred". Philosophy East and West. 43 (1): 144–150. doi:10.2307/1399476. JSTOR 1399476.
- Howard, D. (2011). Being Human in Islam: The Impact of the Evolutionary Worldview. Culture and Civilization in the Middle East. Taylor & Francis. ISBN 978-1-136-82027-4.
- Koltas, Nurullah (2014). "The Making of the City of Virtues-a Traditional Perspective on Restoring Values among People". Procedia - Social and Behavioral Sciences. 152. Elsevier BV: 253–257. doi:10.1016/j.sbspro.2014.09.189. ISSN 1877-0428.
- López-Baralt, Luce (2000). "Knowledge of the Sacred: The Mystical Poetry of Seyyed Hossein Nasr". In Hahn, Lewis Edwin; Auxier, Randall E.; Stone Jr., Lucian W. (eds.). The Philosophy of Seyyed Hossein Nasr. Open Court. ISBN 978-0812694147.
- Lumbard, Joseph E.B. (2013). "Seyyed Hossein Nasr on Tradition and Modernity". In Marshall, D. (ed.). Tradition and Modernity: Christian and Muslim Perspectives. Georgetown University Press. ISBN 978-1-58901-982-9.
- McLelland, J.C. (1989). Prometheus Rebound: The Irony of Atheism. Editions SR. Wilfrid Laurier University Press. ISBN 978-0-88920-696-0.
- Moten, Abdul Rashid (2013). "Islam and Civilisational Renewal : The Case for Sacred Science". Islam and Civilisational Renewal. 4 (4). TechKnowledge General Trading LLC: 562–578. doi:10.12816/0034788. ISSN 1394-0937.
- Nasr, Seyyed Hossein (1989). "Man, Pontifical and Promethean". Knowledge and the Sacred. State University of New York. ISBN 978-0791401774.
- Ogunnaike, Oludamini (2016). "From Heathen to Sub-Human: A Genealogy of the Influence of the Decline of Religion on the Rise of Modern Racism". Open Theology. 2 (1). Walter de Gruyter GmbH. doi:10.1515/opth-2016-0059. ISSN 2300-6579. S2CID 13877934.
- Rehman, Ahmed Abdul; Hashimi, Prof. Dr. Mohyuddin (2021-06-30). "Islamization of Knowledge and Modern Sciences: The Discourse of Seyyed Hussein Nasr". Majallah-yi Talim O Tahqiq. 3 (2): 163–171. ISSN 2618-1363.
- Saltzman, Judy D. (2000). "The Concept of Spiritual Knowledge in the Philosophy of Seyyed Hossein Nasr". In Hahn, Lewis Edwin; Auxier, Randall E.; Stone Jr., Lucian W. (eds.). The Philosophy of Seyyed Hossein Nasr. Open Court. ISBN 978-0812694147.
- Sayem, Md. Abu (2019). "The Eco-Philosophy of Seyyed Hossein Nasr". Islamic Studies. 58 (2): 271–295. ISSN 2710-5326.
- Shu-hsien, Liu (2000). "Reflections on Tradition and Modernity: A Response to Seyyed Hossein Nasr from Neo-Confucian Perspective". In Hahn, Lewis Edwin; Auxier, Randall E.; Stone Jr., Lucian W. (eds.). The Philosophy of Seyyed Hossein Nasr. Open Court. ISBN 978-0812694147.
- Siddiqui, M. (2015). Hospitality and Islam: Welcoming in God's Name. Yale University Press. ISBN 978-0-300-21186-3.
- Stepaniants, M.T. (1994). Sufi Wisdom. SUNY series in Islam (in Maltese). State University of New York Press. ISBN 978-0-7914-1796-6.
- Stone, Lucian W. Jr. (2005). "Nasr, Seyyed Hossein". In Shook, John R. (ed.). The Dictionary of Modern American Philosophers. Thoemmes Continuum. ISBN 978-1843710370.
- Umar, Muhammad Suheyl (2011). "Return of the "Native"". In Baudot, B.S.; Havel, V. (eds.). Candles in the Dark: A New Spirit for a Plural World. EBL-Schweitzer. University of Washington Press. ISBN 978-0-295-80076-9.
