= Refutation of Helvetius =

Written work by Denis Diderot

- Author: Denis Diderot
- Language: French
- Genre: Philosophy, polemic
- Publication date: 1773
- Publication place: France
- Media type: Tract

Refutation of Helvetius (French: Refutation de l'ouvrage d'Helvetius intitule L'Homme) was composed in 1773 by Denis Diderot. It contains a rebuttal to some of the arguments made by Helvétius in his posthumously published work, De l'Homme (On Man).

== Background ==
Jean Claude Adrien Helvétius, 1715-1771, was a philosopher and one of the Encyclopedists; his main work, 'De L'Esprit' (1758), was condemned by the Pope, the Parlement and the Sorbonne, and was publicly burned.

Helvetius, a friend of Diderot, was a freethinker; many of his views were also the views of Diderot. The two shared a common acceptance of philosophical materialism, and in many respects their views on metaphysics were identical. The fundamental disagreement boiled down to a few issues on which Diderot was in vehement disagreement with Helvetius, and Diderot directed a polemical tract against him. First, Helvetius proposed that human behavior is indistinguishable from animal behavior since both humans and animals obtain knowledge through the five senses. Here, Diderot agreed with Helvetius that humans are a species of animals, and animals are not automata; however, he completely disagreed with the view that studying animal behavior can yield insights into human behavior.

Additionally, Helvetius was an environmentalist of an extreme kind. According to Helvetius everything about a human's development may be ascribed to the environment. Helvetius also did not distinguish between sensations and judgement. Diderot was opposed to these views.

In May 1758, while the eighth volume of the Encyclopédie was in preparation, Helvétius published his De l'ésprit. It was widely-read and instantly condemned. Although Helvétius was not a contributor to the Encyclopédie and not a personal friend of Diderot until later the backlash against his work rebounded also on the Encyclopedia, in the view of Jonathan Israel inevitably.In the fall of 1758, the Jansenist A.J. Chaumeix launched a long series of detailed attacks on both, conjoining the two. The Parlement of Paris opened a session in January 1759 to examine subversive works, and Helvétius's work was formally banned and burned. The Encyclopédie was also examined, and it only just escaped proscription. But it was clear its days were numbered.

In spite of their philosophical kinship, these differences highlight the nuanced debates and disagreements that were present among Enlightenment thinkers.
