= Environmental philosophy =

Branch of philosophy

Environmental philosophy is the branch of philosophy that is concerned with the natural environment and humans' place within it. It asks crucial questions about human environmental relations such as "What do we mean when we talk about nature?" "What is the value of the natural, that is non-human environment to us, or in itself?" "How should we respond to environmental challenges such as environmental degradation, pollution and climate change?" "How can we best understand the relationship between the natural world and human technology and development?" and "What is our place in the natural world?" Environmental philosophy includes environmental ethics, environmental aesthetics, ecofeminism, environmental hermeneutics, and environmental theology. Some of the main areas of interest for environmental philosophers are:

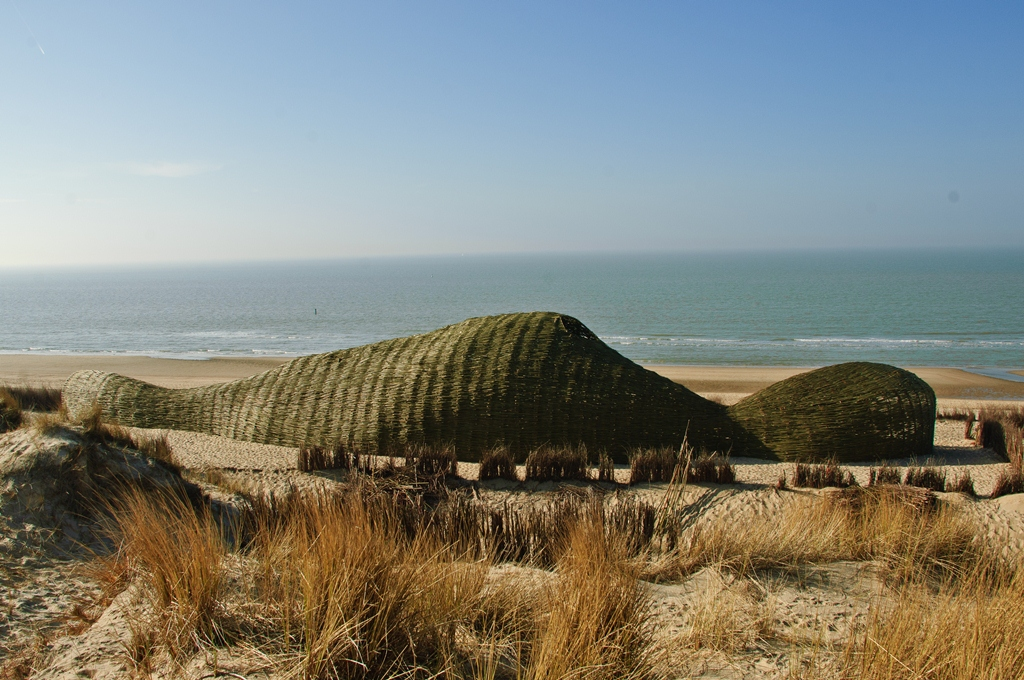
Marco Casagrande Sandworm, Beaufort04 Triennial of Contemporary Art, Wenduine, Belgium 2012

- Defining environment and nature
- How to value the environment
- Moral status of animals and plants
- Endangered species
- Environmentalism and deep ecology
- Aesthetic value of nature
- Intrinsic value
- Wilderness
- Restoration of nature
- Consideration of future generations
- Ecophenomenology

== Contemporary issues ==
Modern issues within environmental philosophy include but are not restricted to the concerns of environmental activism, questions raised by science and technology, environmental justice, and climate change. These include issues related to the depletion of finite resources and other harmful and permanent effects brought on to the environment by humans, as well as the ethical and practical problems raised by philosophies and practices of environmental conservation, restoration, and policy in general. Another question that has settled on the minds of modern environmental philosophers is "Do rivers have rights?" At the same time environmental philosophy deals with the value human beings attach to different kinds of environmental experience, particularly how experiences in or close to non-human environments contrast with urban or industrialized experiences, and how this varies across cultures with close attention paid to indigenous people.

== Modern history ==
Environmental philosophy emerged as a branch of philosophy in 1970s. Early environmental philosophers include Seyyed Hossein Nasr, Richard Routley, Arne Næss, and J. Baird Callicott. The movement was an attempt to connect with humanity's sense of alienation from nature in a continuing fashion throughout history. This was very closely related to the development at the same time of ecofeminism, an intersecting discipline. Since then its areas of concern have expanded significantly.

The field is today characterized by a notable diversity of stylistic, philosophical and cultural approaches to human environmental relationships, from personal and poetic reflections on environmental experience and arguments for panpsychism to Malthusian applications of game theory or the question of how to put an economic value on nature's services. A major debate arose in the 1970s and 80s was that of whether nature has intrinsic value in itself independent of human values or whether its value is merely instrumental, with ecocentric or deep ecology approaches emerging on the one hand versus consequentialist or pragmatist anthropocentric approaches on the other.

Another debate that arose at this time was the debate over whether there really is such a thing as wilderness or not, or whether it is merely a cultural construct with colonialist implications as suggested by William Cronon. Since then, readings of environmental history and discourse have become more critical and refined. In this ongoing debate, a diversity of dissenting voices have emerged from different cultures around the world questioning the dominance of Western assumptions, helping to transform the field into a global area of thought.

In recent decades, there has been a significant challenge to deep ecology and the concepts of nature that underlie it, some arguing that there is not really such a thing as nature at all beyond some self-contradictory and even politically dubious constructions of an ideal other that ignore the real human-environmental interactions that shape our world and lives. This has been alternately dubbed the postmodern, constructivist, and most recently post-naturalistic turn in environmental philosophy. Environmental aesthetics, design and restoration have emerged as important intersecting disciplines that keep shifting the boundaries of environmental thought, as have the science of climate change and biodiversity and the ethical, political and epistemological questions they raise.

=== Social ecology movement ===
In 1982, Murray Bookchin described his philosophy of Social Ecology which provides a framework for understanding nature, our relationship with nature, and our relationships to each other. According to this philosophy, defining nature as "unspoiled wilderness" denies that humans are biological creatures created by natural evolution. It also takes issue with the attitude that "everything that exists is natural", as this provides us with no framework for judging a landfill as less natural than a forest. Instead, social ecology defines nature as a tendency in healthy ecosystems toward greater levels of diversity, complementarity, and freedom. Practices that are congruent with these principles are more natural than those that are not.

Building from this foundation, Bookchin argues that "The ecological crisis is a social crisis":

- Practices which simplify biodiversity and dominate nature (monocropping, overfishing, clearcutting, etc.) are linked to societal tendencies to simplify and dominate humanity.
- Such societies create cultural institutions like poverty, racism, patriarchy, homophobia, and genocide from this same desire to simplify and dominate.
- In turn, Social Ecology suggests addressing the root causes of environmental degradation requires creating a society that promotes decentralization, interdependence, and direct democracy rather than profit extraction.

=== Deep ecology movement ===
In 1984, George Sessions and Arne Næss articulated the principles of the new Deep Ecology Movement. These basic principles are:

- The well-being and flourishing of human and non-human life have value.
- Richness and diversity of life forms contribute to the realization of these values and are also values in themselves.
- Humans have no right to reduce this richness and diversity except to satisfy vital needs.
- The flourishing of human life and cultures is compatible with a substantial decrease in the human population.
- Present human interference with the nonhuman world is excessive, and the situation is rapidly worsening.
- Policies must therefore be changed. These policies affect basic economic, technological, and ideological structures. The resulting state of affairs will be deeply different from the present.
- The ideological change is mainly that of appreciating life quality (dwelling in situations of inherent value), rather than adhering to an increasingly higher standard of living. There will be a profound awareness of the difference between big and great.
- Those who subscribe to the foregoing points have an obligation directly or indirectly to try to implement the necessary changes.

=== Resacralization of nature ===
Resacralization of nature is a term used in environmental philosophy to describe the process of restoring the sacred quality of nature. The primary assumption is that nature possesses a sanctified aspect that has been lost in modern times as a result of the secularization of contemporary worldviews. These secular worldviews are considered directly responsible for the spiritual crisis in "modern man", which has ultimately contributed to the current environmental degradation. This perspective emphasizes the significance of changing human perceptions of nature by incorporating religious principles and values that reconnect nature with the divine. The Iranian philosopher Seyyed Hossein Nasr first conceptualized the theme of resacralization of nature in contemporary language, and it was further developed by a number of theologians and philosophers such as Alister McGrath, Sallie McFague and Rosemary Radford Ruether.

== The values of nature ==
The values of nature encompass the various ways societies perceive and attribute importance to the non-human world, spanning extrinsic, intrinsic, and relational dimensions. An intrinsic value is valuable for its own sake, as an end in itself; an extrinsic value is characterized as what is valuable as a means, or for something else's sake; and relational values correspond to the meaningful relationships, responsibilities and cultural connections between humans and nature (the intrinsic values of human-nature interactions). This framing has become increasingly central to environmental philosophy and policy in response to the modern ecological crisis. Building on the work of the Millennium Ecosystem Assessment, the Intergovernmental Science-Policy Platform on Biodiversity and Ecosystem Services (IPBES), advocates for such a broad articulation of nature's values to guide policy decision making and ecological restoration.

Extrinsic (Instrumental) values: Refer to nature's utility to humans, such as the provision of timber, purification of water and air, carbon sequestration or pollination—often called ecosystem services for which comprehensive classifications have been made. Many can be described with an economic value, leading to inclusion in environmental impact assessments, cost-benefit analyses, and systems of national accounts.

Intrinsic values: the philosophical stance that all living things and natural systems have value or inherent worth, regardless of any utility to humans. This can include the value attributed to:

- The existence of an organism—such as Schweitzer's philosophy of reverence for all of life, and Arne Naess's attribution of value to all "life forms".
- Attributes of an organism—such as Tom Regan's "the experiencing subject of a life", or Paul Taylor's agency of a species that can attain "the full development of its biological powers".
- Entire ecosystems—that can "preserve the integrity, stability and beauty of the biotic community", Aldo Leopold; or Holmes Rolston's concept of systemic value.

Relational values: the diverse meaningful relationships, responsibilities, and cultural connections between humans and nature, have been expressed over the centuries. They can include values of:

- Culture and connection—as espoused in Celtic mythology, as in the Song of Amergin, early Chinese philosophy Lao Tzu's Tao Te Ching, or the worldview of Aboriginal Australians, where concepts of the Dreaming and Country have deep connections with a living earth.
- Aesthetic experiences—such as captured in poetry of Wordsworth; the beautiful and the sublime as described by Edmund Burke and Immanuel Kant and contemporary thinkers such as Arnold Berleant describing activity in nature as an aesthetic of "total engagement".
- The sacred—spiritual experiences such as an inner attentiveness to "the 'unspoken' is the language of the earth that escapes the human will" Byung-Chul Han; the contemplations of mystics such as Jan van Ruysbroeck who retreated to the depths of the forest; to perceive a voice "without the sound of words" that "speaks all truth"; or Bonaventure who developed a systematic pathway of spiritual development building on premise that "all creatures in this world: are "divinely given signs".
- The ethic of care—such as espoused by the Metta Sutta which aims to cultivate loving-kindness for all beings, regardless of their size or even if they can be seen; Isaac the Syrian who maintained that a good heart, burns with charity "for men, for the birds, for the beasts" and "all creatures".; or Martin Heidegger for whom the concept of "saving the earth" is prerequisite for harmonious coexistence of dwelling on the earth.
- Dialogue with nature—where acting as "co-creators of a living soil" is integral to a caring agricultural practice, as exemplified by Vandana Shiva; developing interspecies dialogue that seeks to engage with the world as a community of "kindred beings" as advocated by Val Plumwood; the work of Eva Meijer, who explores how communication with animals can inform better ethical decisions, in real-life situations; or as forms of governance that incorporate non-human perspectives through human proxies, as Bruna Latour envisioned in the "Parliament of Things".

Articulating such values requires supporting and incorporating the views of people from diverse cultural backgrounds across the planet. Such a perspective has already been supported by IPBES, but requires further development as well as implementation in planning and policy. Ultimately, weaving these diverse values into the fabric of global and regional planning and policy is essential for a comprehensive and sustainable response to the ongoing ecological crisis.

== See also ==
- Environmental Philosophy (journal)
- Environmental Values
- Environmental Ethics (journal)
- Ecomodernism
- List of environmental philosophers
- Environmental hermeneutics
- Islamic environmentalism
