= Resacralization of nature =

Term denoting the restoration of the perceivedly sacred quality of nature

Resacralization of nature is a term used in environmental philosophy to describe the process of restoring the sacred quality of nature. The primary assumption is that nature possesses a sanctified aspect that has been lost in modern times as a result of the secularization of contemporary worldviews. These secular worldviews are considered directly responsible for the spiritual crisis in "modern man", which has ultimately contributed to the current environmental degradation. This perspective emphasizes the significance of changing human perceptions of nature by incorporating religious principles and values that reconnect nature with the divine. The Iranian philosopher Seyyed Hossein Nasr first conceptualized the theme of resacralization of nature in contemporary language, and it was further developed by a number of theologians and philosophers such as Alister McGrath, Sallie McFague and Rosemary Radford Ruether.

== Historical development ==
According to Tarik M. Quadir, Seyyed Hossein Nasr is "the first person ever to write extensively about the philosophical and religious dimension of the [environmental] crisis." Quadir reaches this conclusion "based on [his] inability to find any comparable scholarly work prior to Nasr's The Encounter of Man and Nature: The Spiritual Crisis of Modern Man (London: George Allen and Unwin, 1968) dealing with the religious and philosophical roots of the contemporary environmental crisis at length." Nasr first presented his insight in a 1965 essay, expanding it in a series of lectures given at the University of Chicago the following year, in May 1966, several months before Lynn White, Jr. gave his famous lecture before the American Academy of Arts and Sciences on December 26, 1966 (published in Science in 1967 as The Historical Roots of Our Ecologic Crisis). Nasr's lectures were later published as The Encounter of Man and Nature: The Spiritual Crisis of Modern Man in 1968 in which he argued, in a detailed manner, "for the revival of a sacred view of the universe in order to combat the contemporary environmental crisis". The theme of resacralization of nature later became an important issue in the writings of many theologians and philosophers.

== Background ==
Almut Beringer, commenting on Nasr's work, states that several historical processes, most notably the emergence of secular humanism during and after the Renaissance, contributed to the "absolutization of earthly man" and the formation of a secular reductionist science within the Christian civilisation. Nasr believes that the environmental catastrophe is the result of a spiritual crisis in "modern man," which was sparked by the reduction and trivialization of religious ideas about nature, the universe, and humanity. Nasr is opposed to scientific reasoning that compares the human body with a machine and the world with a collection of resources that humans may manipulate. He calls into question the alleged conceptual limits of science in a secular framework, which preclude interpretations that are not governed by physical principles.

It is the secularized worldview that reduces nature to a purely material domain cut off from the world of the Spirit to be plundered at will for what is usually called human welfare, but which really means the illusory satisfaction of a never-ending greed without which consumer society would not exist.

— Seyyed Hossein Nasr quoted in Sarah Elizabeth Robinson, Common Ground in Sacred Nature: Unearthing Ecological Solidarity between Nasr and Ruether, 2014

For Nasr, the environmental crisis is a "crisis of the soul" that "technologized science" cannot cure alone since "modern man" is in need of a spiritual rebirth. According to Nasr, "modern man" has lost sight of who he is in respect to God and nature. This forgetfulness implies a disregard for the sacred foundation of the human body and the body of nature. The environmental catastrophe is portrayed as an outward representation of an inner malaise that resides within the souls of men and women who have abandoned heaven for earth and are now on the verge of destroying it. Thus, for Nasr, spiritual imbalance is the primary source of environmental problems. To resolve this problem, he investigates the perspectives of various religions on the order of nature and urges "modern" individuals to perceive nature through a sacralized perspective.

According to Alister McGrath, "the decline of modernist antipathy to religion" has contributed to substantial debate of religion's significance in human culture and intellectual life. Through the resacralization of nature, which has generated renewed interest in "religious readings of nature," the significance of religion in environmental concerns is becoming more generally recognized in the contemporary age. For McGrath, religion is a natural, unavoidable component of human existence and culture, notwithstanding modernist social engineering initiatives aiming at its extinction in many places. According to Almut Beringer, a cursory examination of history reveals that living without awareness of a sacred cosmos is a cultural misunderstanding and historical anomaly that Western civilization should reconsider.

== Concept ==
In Man and Nature (1968), Nasr draws attention to the spiritual crisis that underpins the ecological issue. According to Ian S. Mevorach, Nasr does not offer a particular Islamic environmental theology in this treatise. Rather, he contended that traditional Islamic theology engages in what he refers to as the symbolist spirit, which sees nature's spiritual quality as well as its physical quantity. This spirit connects people with nature and binds the natural with the supernatural, and regards nature as a sacred source of revelation as stated in the Qur'an.

In the same way that there are many heavens, each belonging to a particular religious cosmos, and yet a single Heaven of which each of the particular heavens is a reflection and yet in essence that Heaven Itself, so are there many earths and forms of religious knowledge of these earths. But there is a perspective that encompasses many salient features of those diverse forms of religious knowledge, despite their differences, leading to a knowledge of the Earth that would be recognizable by the various religious traditions at least in their sapiential dimension if not in their [particular] theological, social, and juridical formulations. It is in the light of this knowledge, drawn from various traditions—which can in fact enrich other traditions in many ways today—that we must seek to reassert the sacred quality of nature and to speak of its resacralization.

— Seyyed Hossein Nasr quoted in Ismail Al‐Hanif, A hedgehog bleeds green: Seyyed Hossein Nasr's Religion & The Order of Nature, 1998

According to Nasr, resacralization of nature does not imply bestowing sacredness on nature because this is beyond man's capacity. It just entails removing the veils of ignorance and pride that have obscured the sacredness of nature from the sight of humanity. According to Nasr, preserving the sanctity of life necessitates the rediscovery of nature's sacred quality.

Nature has been already sacralized by the Sacred Itself, and its resacralization means more than anything else a transformation within man, who has himself lost his Sacred Center, so as to be able to rediscover the Sacred and consequently to behold again nature's sacred quality.

— Seyyed Hossein Nasr quoted in Sarah Robinson-Bertoni, Key Thinkers on the Environment, 2017

According to Nasr, nature is forever sacred because it has been sacralized by the divine, despite human ignorance of its sacredness. Resacralization occurs when individuals become aware of the divinity in nature. He refers to inner transformation through a shift in perspective; thus, resacralizing nature means reorienting people towards the divine in everything, including the functioning of nature. As stated by Almut Beringer, "resacralizing nature is not so much a task of intervening and 'doing' in nature but much more a task of self-transformation, a way of 'being' relying on humility." According to Reza Shah-Kazemi, the sacrilege committed by men's hands on land and at sea can only be remedied through re-sacralization, which can only be accomplished by individual spiritual effort on the one hand, and God's mercy on the other. Farzin Vahdat quotes Nasr as saying that it is only conceivable if metaphysical knowledge pertaining to nature is revived.

== Themes ==
=== Reenchantment of nature ===
In his book The Reenchantment of Nature, Alister McGrath seeks to analyze the contemporary environmental crisis and its alleged roots in Western history, stating that "The roots of our ecological crisis lie in the rise of a self-centered view of reality that has come into possession of the hardware it needs to achieve its goals." He refers to the "secular creed of twentieth-century Western culture" as "the most self-centered religion in history", with roots in the eighteenth-century Enlightenment, and the underlying premise that "humanity is the arbiter of all ideas and values". For McGrath, "a right attitude to nature rests on the revival of our capacity for wonder, resting on our appreciation of the nature of reality itself". If nature has been disenchanted, the remedy, according to Mcgrath, is to reenchant it. According to him, "to re-enchant nature is not merely to gain a new respect for the integrity and well-being; it is to throw open the doors to a deeper level of existence". He advocates for restoring the concept of nature as God's creation and acting appropriately, aligning attitudes and actions with beliefs. John Hart compares McGrath's and Nasr's ideas on nature, pointing out similarities in both. According to him, both of these thinkers "call for a religious recovery of traditional attitudes toward and actions upon Earth, so that Nature might be 'resacralized' (Nasr) and 'reenchanted' (McGrath)".

=== God as al Muhit ===
In Islam and the Environmental Crisis (1992), Nasr offers an Islamic doctrine of God in which he highlights the Quran's portrayal of God as the All Encompassing (Muhit), as stated in the verse, "But to God belong all things in the heavens and on earth: and He it is who encompasseth (muhit) all things" (4: 126). He points out that the term muhit also refers to the environment. According to him, "humans are immersed in the Divine Muhit and are only unaware of it because of their own forgetfulness and negligence (ghaflah)", which he considers to be the "underlying sin of the soul" that must be overcome by remembrance (dhikr). Thus, remembering God is seeing Him everywhere and experiencing His reality as al Muhit. According to Nasr, the environmental crisis may be attributed to humanity's failure to recognize God as the true "environment" that surrounds and sustains everything. The contemporary endeavor to regard the natural environment as an "ontologically independent order of reality", detached from the Divine Environment, without whose liberating grace it gets suffocated and dies, culminates in environmental calamity. According to Nasr, remembering God as al Muhit means being aware of nature's sacred quality and viewing nature as signs of God which is permeated by the Divine Presence of His Reality. According to Ian S. Mevorach, Nasr seeks to resacralize nature "by lifting up the divine name al‐Muhit" and recognizing nature's intimate relationship with God.

=== The world as God's body ===
Sallie McFague proposes a new model of the God–world relationship in place of dominant Christian theological model of God as king of the world. According to this new model, both God's immanence and God's transcendence are connected to the universe. For McFague, "if God is the inspirited body of the whole universe, then both God's transcendent dimension—the Spirit—and God's immanent dimension—the body—are intimately connected to the natural world in which we live." According to McFague, when people perceive God as being above and away from the universe, they tend to imagine themselves as being disconnected from the world and having dominion over it. McFague believes that bringing God closer to the world will cause us to identify with and love the world.

=== Ecofeminist theology ===
Ecofeminists question representations of nature and women as passive resources for exploitation, with a particular emphasis on the traditions of Western science and religion. According to Rosemary Radford Ruether, global ecofeminism reveals how these tendencies of environmental degradation and emaciation are interconnected in a global economic system biased in favor of the richer beneficiaries of the market economy. According to Ruether, ecofeminism integrates the studies of ecology with feminism by demonstrating the ideological and social-structural links between forces that wish to dominate nature and women. According to Melissa Raphael, a feminist conception of the sacred would, in some ways, render all things sacramental in its efforts to resacralize nature; but only to a certain point. Although, in terms of the divine's immanence in creation, all things are deemed sacred in their created state.

=== Eco-ascetic practices ===
Nasr advocates for asceticism in Western societies in order to address environmental crisis. He rejects the notion that asceticism implies anti-nature sentiment, reiterating a traditional Muslim warning against greed as a highly destructive force for religiosity and injurious to the environment. Nasr extols St. Francis' worldview of connection with nature while criticizing people who dismiss ascetic knowledge in a world marketplace tainted with greed that commercializes and destroys nature. According to Nasr, the modern world must accept asceticism as a means of controlling one's desires and slaying the monster inside, without which the greed that is driving the current degradation of nature cannot be addressed.

Similarly, Rosemary Radford Ruether contemplates on the "contrasts" within the Christian asceticism and how they relate to environmental and anti-exploitative ethics. For her, "Christian anti-materiality" shows "[P]atterns of neglect of and flight from the earth". However, "asceticism can also be understood, not as rejection of the body and the earth, but rather as a rejection of exploitation and excess, and thus as a return to egalitarian simple living in harmony with other humans and nature".

== See also ==
- Scientia sacra
- Pontifical and Promethean man

== Sources ==
- Al‐Hanif, Ismail (1998). "A hedgehog bleeds green: Seyyed Hossein Nasr's Religion & The Order of Nature". Social Epistemology. 12 (4). Informa UK Limited: 345–361. doi:10.1080/02691729808578891. ISSN 0269-1728.
- Robinson-Bertoni, Sarah (2017). "Seyyed Hossein Nasr". In Palmer, J.A.; Cooper, D.E.; Cooper, D. (eds.). Key Thinkers on the Environment. Routledge Key Guides. Taylor & Francis. ISBN 978-1-134-75624-7.
- Beringer, Almut (2006). "Reclaiming a Sacred Cosmology: Seyyed Hossein Nasr, the Perennial Philosophy, and Sustainability Education". Canadian Journal of Environmental Education. 11 (1): 26–42. ISSN 1205-5352.
- Foltz, Richard (2006). "Seyyed Hossein Nasr". In Taylor, Bron (ed.). The Encyclopedia of Religion and Nature. Continuum. ISBN 9780199754670.
- Foltz, Richard (2013). "Ecology in Islam". In Runehov, Anne L. C.; Oviedo, Lluis (eds.). Encyclopedia of Sciences and Religions. Springer. ISBN 978-1402082641.
- Foltz, Richard C (2006a). "Islam". In Gottlieb, Roger S. (ed.). The Oxford Handbook of Religion and Ecology. Oxford University Press. ISBN 978-0199747627.
- Gade, Anna M. (2019). "Muslim Environmentalism as Religious Practice: Accounts of the Unseen". Muslim Environmentalisms: Religious and Social Foundations. Columbia University Press. ISBN 9780231191050.
- Hart, J. (2013). Cosmic Commons: Spirit, Science, and Space. Wipf and Stock Publishers. ISBN 978-1-63087-057-7.
- Hoel, Nina; Nogueira-Godsey, Elaine (2011). "Transforming Feminisms: Religion, Women, and Ecology". Journal for the Study of Religion. 24 (2): 5–15. JSTOR 24764281.
- Johnston, David L. (2012). "Intra-Muslim Debates on Ecology: Is Shari'a Still Relevant?". Worldviews. 16 (3): 218–238 [221]. doi:10.1163/15685357-01603003. JSTOR 43809777.
- Lustig, B.A.; Brody, B.A.; McKenny, G.P. (2008). Altering Nature: Volume II: Religion, Biotechnology, and Public Policy. Philosophy and Medicine. Springer Netherlands. ISBN 978-1-4020-6923-9.
- McGrath, A.E. (2008). The Open Secret: A New Vision for Natural Theology. Wiley. ISBN 978-1-4051-2691-5.
- Mevorach, Ian S. (2017). "The Divine Environment (al-Muhit) and the Body of God: Seyyed Hossein Nasr and Sallie McFague Resacralize Nature". The Wiley Blackwell Companion to Religion and Ecology. Chichester, UK: John Wiley & Sons, Ltd. doi:10.1002/9781118465523.ch23.
- Quadir, Tarik M. (2013). Traditional Islamic Environmentalism: The Vision of Seyyed Hossein Nasr. Lanham, MD: University Press of America. ISBN 978-0-7618-6143-0.
- Raphael, M. (1996). Thealogy and Embodiment: The Post-Patriarchal Reconstruction of Female Sacrality. Feminist Theology Series. Bloomsbury Academic. ISBN 978-1-85075-757-3.
- Kazemi, Reza Shah (2017). "From Sacrilege to Sacralisation: Seyyed Hossein Nasr's Perspectives on the Ecological Crisis in the Light of the Holy Qur'an" (PDF). Sacred Web. 40: 103–11.
- Robinson, Sarah Elizabeth (2014). "Common Ground in Sacred Nature: Unearthing Ecological Solidarity between Nasr and Ruether". In Silverman, E.L.; von der Horst, D.; Bauman, W. (eds.). Voices of Feminist Liberation. Taylor & Francis. ISBN 978-1-317-54369-5.
- Vahdat, F. (2015). Islamic Ethos and the Specter of Modernity. Anthem Middle East Studies. Anthem Press. ISBN 978-1-78308-439-5.
