= Environmental hermeneutics =

Area of philosophical study

Environmental hermeneutics is a term for a wide range of scholarship that applies the techniques and resources of the philosophical field of hermeneutics to environmental issues. That is to say it addresses issues of interpretation as they relate to nature and environmental issues broadly conceived to include wilderness, ecosystems, landscapes, ecology, the built environment (architecture), life, embodiment, and more. Work in environmental philosophy, ecocriticism, environmental theology, ecotheology, and similar disciplines may overlap the field of environmental hermeneutics.

In the public sphere, much of the focus on “the environment” is concerned with discovering scientific facts and then reporting how policy can act on these facts. On its face, philosophical hermeneutics might appear to be an unrelated enterprise. But... even the facts of the sciences are given meaning by how humans interpret them. Of course this does not mean that there are no facts, or that all facts must come from scientific discourse. Rather... [it calls] for mediation—the mediation that grounds the interpretive task of connecting fact and meaning through a number of different structures and forms. (Clingerman, et al. 2013, emphasis added)

== See also ==
- Ecosemiotics
