= Playing God (ethics) =

Rhetorical strategy and accusation

Playing God refers to assuming powers of decision, intervention, or control metaphorically reserved to God. Acts described as playing God may include, for example, deciding who should live or die in a situation where not everyone can be saved, the use and development of biotechnologies such as synthetic biology, and in vitro fertilisation. Usually the expression is used pejoratively and to criticize or argue against the supposedly God-like actions.

== Description ==
Playing God is a broad concept, which is encompassed by both theological and scientific topics. When the term is used, it can be used to refer to people who try to exercise great authority and power. It is usually pejorative and suggests arrogance, misappropriation of power, or tampering with matters in which humans should not meddle.

== Etymology ==
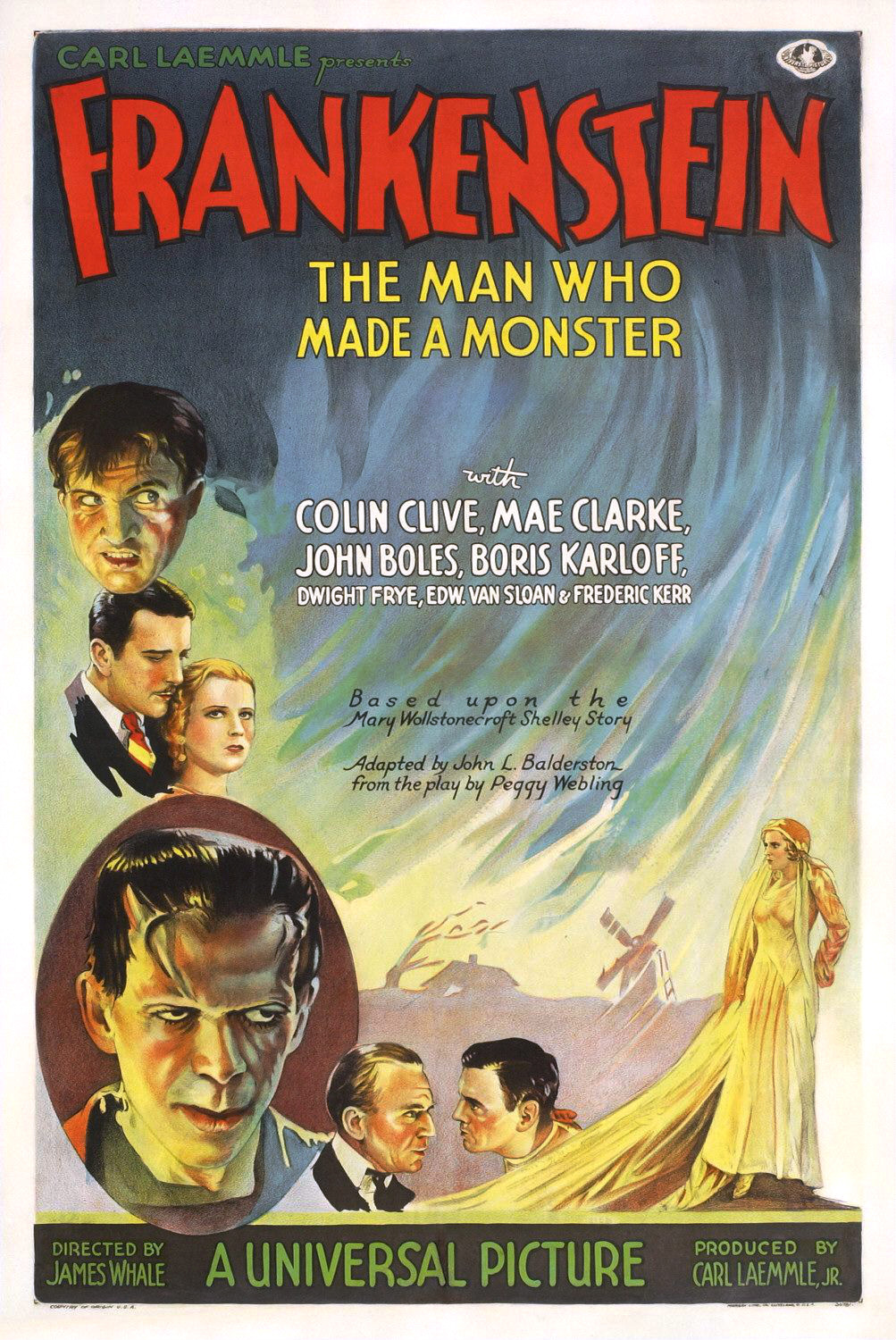
The official theatrical poster for Frankenstein (1931). In one scene (censored from the final film), Dr. Frankenstein proclaimed, "Now I know what it feels like to be God!"

Playing God generally refers to someone using their power to make decisions regarding the fate of another's life or many lives. Theologian Paul Ramsey is noted for saying, "Men ought not to play God before they learn to be men, and after they have learned to be men they will not play God." The religious framework of approach to this phrase refers to said religion's deity having a set plan for mankind, therefore man's hubris may lead to the misuse of technology related to sacred life or nature. Other famous literary texts that allude to a man and God complex include Men Like Gods by H. G. Wells and You Shall Be Gods by Erich Fromm. The notion of god-like knowledge or power in humans goes back at least to the story of forbidden fruit in Genesis 3:4–5 whose traditional English translation includes the words "ye shall be as gods".

== History of the accusation ==
=== In bioethics ===
In modern history, there have been many scientific projects which have been considered to be attempted acts of playing God. Biomedical projects such as the attempted creation of artificial sperm and the creation of artificial life itself have brought the sci-fi stories of the 1900s out of fantasy and closer to reality. Other projects scientists have attempted include cloning (Dolly the sheep), even bringing back other extinct species that were previously thought to have been lost to time and could possibly be reintroduced to the wild. The fairly recent discovery of DNA has led to scientists toying with the idea that perhaps human genetics could be edited and possibly improved, despite there being opposition regarding unknown and possibly dire consequences.

The most common form of "playing God" in the modern era is then often attributed to bioethics. Bioethics refers to ethical issues regarding biological science, medicine etc. IVF treatment, abortion, genetic engineering, and artificial insemination are a few of the major topics regarding synthetic reproduction. Cloning was the centre of the playing God topic for decades and is still a taboo scientific subject due to this. Nicholas Hartsoeker in 1694 studied sperm under a microscope and the diagram he proposed for what sperm was, a homunculus in the head of the human sperm. A very little human was said to be observed, and this continued an Aristotelian thought that the sperm was in fact, a sacred little person. Rabbis continued to use Hartsoeker's image centuries later attempting to prove that artificial interference with an embryo or birth was murder, destruction of life. Western nations such as the United States, the United Kingdom, and Australia have made many advances in fields such as IVF, however, places like the Far East do not show nearly as much interest in the topic. Eastern philosophy has its own outlook on issues regarding "playing God", such as the Confucianism school of thought. This provides another angle of analysis that can be offered towards this complicated matter.

==== In genetic modification ====
There is a strong debate regarding morality and the consequences of science and playing God. Gene editing is a big topic that has been the centre of the argument for decades. Many religious figures believe the notion that life is the plan of God and not to be taken away or synthetically given by man, while some scientists argue that if humans are able to do so then God must have meant it to be.

The bioethical debate regarding genetic modification in food and humans has many arguments for and against. In the UK, 4% of the half a million children born have life-affecting genetic defects. This includes genetic diseases that can lead to early death, long-term mental issues, or a lifetime of debilitating physical health problems. Many scientists and supporters of genetic modification argue that DNA is not sacred, and is in fact just chemical sequences in an organism. DNA down to the microscope is just atoms made of elements just like any other living or non-living matter. The University of Pennsylvania in 2016 used mice with a genetic liver disease and were able to genetically edit the mice at birth so that they did not have this deadly disease. It is also argued that since humans are part of nature, then all actions of humanity are technically natural. A beaver building a dam is considered natural, a bird building a nest is also considered natural, so therefore the activities of humans are also natural and a result of autonomy and free will. This argument deduces that certain animals evolved with special traits to assist with their survival and humans developed the special trait of technological advancement.

A common argument against genetic editing especially that of children is the designer baby argument. Designer babies would be children who have been created to be stronger, smarter, possibly more attractive, and with many other desirable traits. This would be a technology that would only be accessible to the rich according to opponents of genetic editing and would create a big divide in society between the rich and the poor not only in wealth status but also in physical appearance and physical ability. The non-secular aspect of opposition to genetic modification is the idea that genetic modification and editing is a step further than selective breeding and an area humanity should not trespass in. King Charles III strongly opposes genetically modified crops and states that mixing genetic materials from different species is dangerous and a matter we should not delve into. It is argued that the crucial boundary between humanity's choice and chance is reliant on the spine of ethics and morality; a minor shift in boundary could cause serious harm to the future of society.

=== In geo-engineering ===
Climate and weather is also a factor that scientists have been looking into that humans could control, with terraforming and cities around the world that are made from scratch and planned out including their geography. Geo-engineering is an example of changing the planet that many deem to be "unnatural and against God". It involves large-scale manipulation of our Earth's natural elements such as the seas, skies, or even atmosphere to counteract against certain environmental issues such as climate change. The debate among scholars is an ongoing battle, where they seek to bring awareness to critical issues and answer questions that relate to the different morality positions when dealing with the manipulation of earth's elements. When focusing on climate engineering and changing the very critical environment that God has provided, we, humans, need to be aware of the possible negative outcomes that can arise when engineering our climate. We need to be ready for anything. One must think about who the vulnerable people are, that are going to be affected by the unperceived consequences. With climate engineering, people are left to question the religious morality of what the human role is when looking at the grand scheme of the universe. Climate change and geo-engineering brings in the concept of the "playing God" critique when dealing with policy changes. The critique on "playing God" refers to the idea that the human species should not be allowed to manipulate our planet, in a way that undermines human's conventional involvement and action with the world around us. Many new technological advances, such as the more recent AI or gene modifications, are just a few examples, that feed on the idea of humans "playing God" or presumably undertaking power that rightfully belongs to both God and the land. Climate engineering once an invention from science fiction is now very real and part of an international political conversation. More extreme practices of climate engineering include stimulating phytoplankton blooms in the ocean by seeding iron to absorb excessive carbon dioxide in the atmosphere, to spraying aerosols in the skies to give clouds the maximum reflectivity and brighten them.

Many secular and even non-secular individuals advocate against geo-engineering and altering the climate simply because the perceived risks are too great. Due to the lack of understanding from humans regarding the consequences of putting different chemicals into the atmosphere or seeding oceans, opponents of geo-engineering suggest it be abandoned (Hartman, 2017). However, climate scientists who support the geo-engineering idea such as Ken Caldeira of Stanford University, suggest that instead of abandoning the idea due to risk, there should be continued research for the consequences of geo-engineering so that the exact probabilities and effects of consequences are understood. Scientists also argue that geo-engineering in some instances can be cheaper and quite financially feasible; however, the opposition to this is that it is a mere quick fix that moves attention away from the development of long-term solutions.

=== In artificial intelligence ===
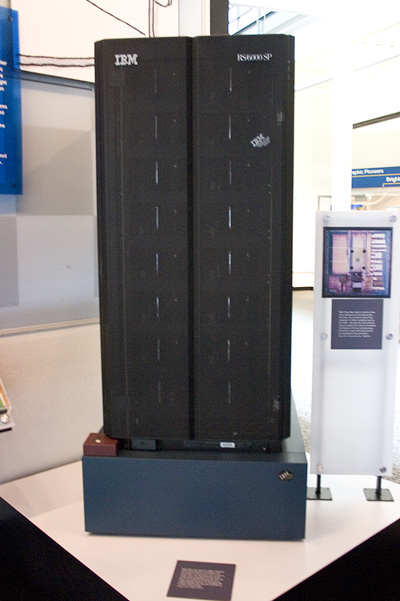
Deep Blue, a computer similar to this one defeated chess world champion Garry Kasparov in May 1997. It is the first computer to win a match against a world champion. Photo taken at the Computer History Museum.

Artificial intelligence has been a frequent topic of moral questioning in the 21st century. Many deem the human creation of another dimension where the being is sentient and possibly near identical to human intelligence to be an act of playing God. Contrary to bioethics and geo-engineering, artificial intelligence does not physically intervene in nature and its processes. Since the invention of the Internet and complex computing systems and algorithms, artificial intelligence has exponentially improved and is now used in everyday technology. The term "artificial intelligence" contrasts that of natural intelligence, displayed by biological organisms. Major organisations around the world, including the United Nations, have commented on the relationship between artificial intelligence and the impact it may have on human lives in a negative way. UN Secretary-General António Guterres noted that AI drone strikes have the capability to possibly go rogue and take lives without human involvement. Other practices of AI can include many other matters, such as Deep Blue, the IBM supercomputer that is capable of beating grandmasters at chess.

== Criticism ==
Philip Ball has argued that "playing God" is a meaningless and dangerous cliché that has no basis in theology. He claims that it was adopted as a rhetorical weapon by bioethicist "theocons", and owes its origin as a reference to the 1931 film version of Frankenstein, and has been used by journalists to refer to things they disagree with. Alexandre Erler, in response to Ball, has argued that while the phrase is not meaningless, it is extremely vague and requires further clarification for it to be useful within the context of an argument.

=== The transhumanist objection ===
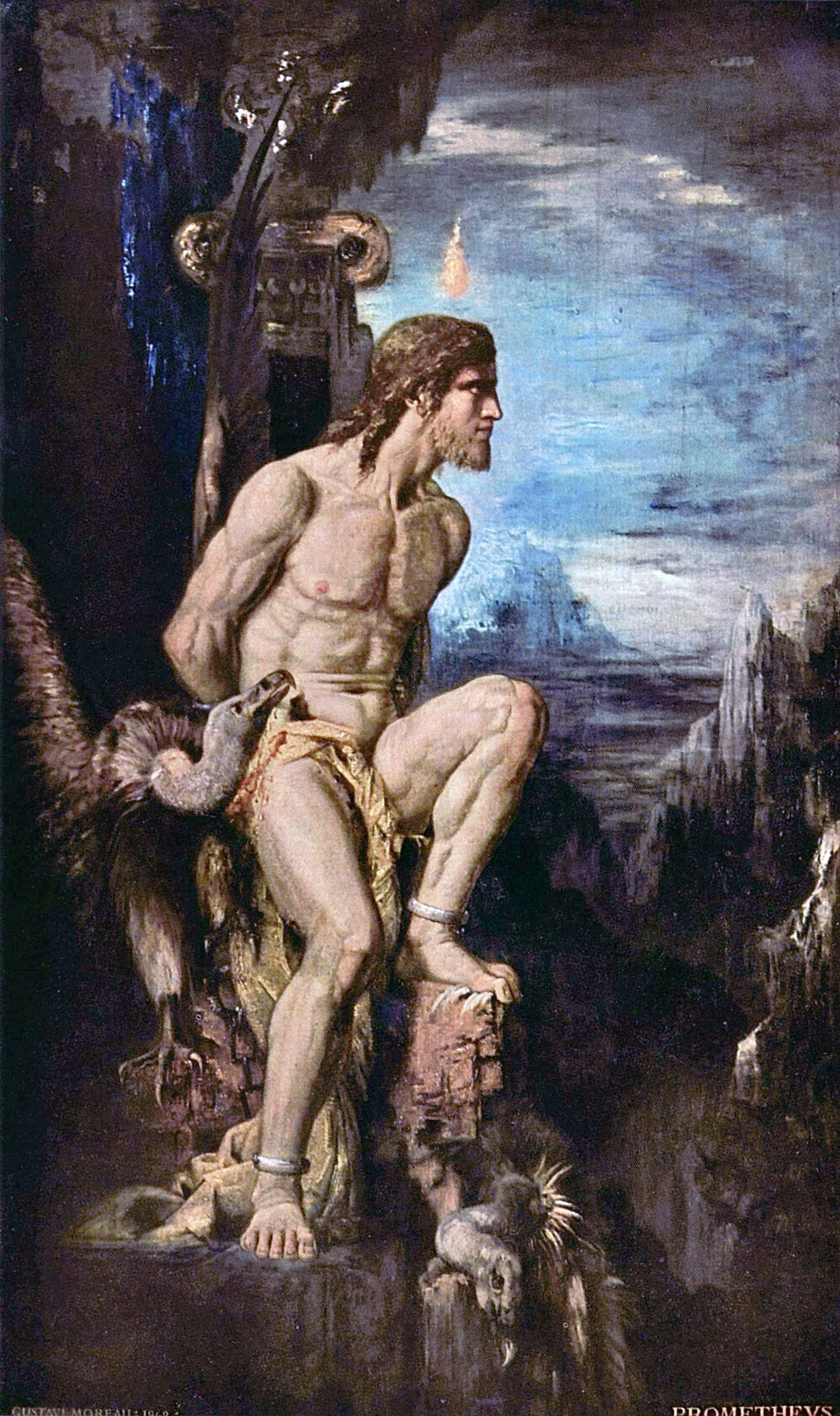
Gustave Moreau's Prometheus (1868)

The term directed evolution is used within the transhumanist community to refer to the idea of applying the principles of directed evolution and experimental evolution to the control of human evolution. Law professor Maxwell Mehlman has said that "for transhumanists, directed evolution is likened to the Holy Grail".

Riccardo Campa of the IEET wrote that "self-directed evolution" can be coupled with many different political, philosophical, and religious views within the transhumanist movement.

== See also ==
- Apotheosis
- Appeal to nature
- Bioethics
- Hubris
- Morality
- Naturalistic fallacy
- Precautionary principle
- Pontifical and Promethean man
