= Al-Insān al-Kāmil =

Concept of "Perfect Human" in Islam

In Islamic theology, al-Insān al-Kāmil (Arabic: الإنسان الكامل), also rendered as Insān-i Kāmil (Persian/Urdu: انسان کامل) and İnsan-ı Kâmil (Turkish), is an honorific title to describe Muhammad, the prophet of Islam. The phrase means "the person who has reached perfection", literally "the complete person". It is an important concept in Islamic culture of the prototype human being, pure consciousness, one's true identity, to be contrasted with the material human who is bound by their senses and materialism. The term was originally used by Sunni Sufis and is still used by them, but it is also used by Alawites and Alevis. This idea is based upon a hadith, which was used by Ibn Arabi, that states about Muhammad: "I was a prophet when Adam was between water and clay."

The Sunni Islamic scholar Muhammad Alawi al-Maliki has published a Sīrah as al-Insān al-Kāmil. Abd al-Karīm al-Jīlī was the author of an Arabic text entitled Al-Insān al-Kāmil. Ismailis believe that each Imam is a perfect man.

== The origin of al-insān al-kāmil ==
Mansur al-Hallaj and Al-Biruni expressed the idea within their works. The concept is evident in the works of Ahmad Yasawi (1093–1166) whose influence spread Sufism across Central Asia. The concept was also applied by ibn Arabi, a well-respected and influential Islamic thinker. The origin of this concept is derived from the Quran and hadith, as mentioned in Ibn Arabi's Fusus Al-Hikam:

Muhammad's wisdom is uniqueness (fardiya) because he is the most perfect existent creature of this human species. For this reason, the command began with him and was sealed with him. He was a Prophet while Adam was between water and clay, and his elemental structure is the Seal of the Prophets.

In the Quran, man's hierarchical status above all beings is seen, as it states that God created humans in the fairest stature. Due to this occurrence the human is favored by God and is said to be given God's light which leads through them to complete perfection. The previous saying illuminates the idea that behind the true objective behind creation is God's desire to be known which is fulfilled through the perfect human being.

== Al-Insān al-kāmil and Ibn al-Arabi ==
Al-Insan al-kamil, or the perfect being, was first deeply discussed in written form by Ibn Arabi in one of his most prolific works entitled Fusus al-Hikam. Taking an idea already common within Sufi culture, Ibn al-Arabi applied deep analysis and reflection on the issue of the Perfect Human and one's pursuit in fulfilling this goal. In developing his explanation of the perfect being al-Arabi first discusses the issue of oneness through the metaphor of the mirror. In this metaphor al-Arabi compares an object being reflected in countless mirrors to the relationship between God and his creatures. God's essence is seen in the existent human being, as God is the object and humans being the mirrors. Meaning two things, that since humans are mere reflections of God there can be no distinction or separation between the two and without God the creatures would be non-existent. When an individual understands that there is no separation between human and God they begin on the path of ultimate oneness. The one who decides to walk in this oneness pursues the true reality and responds to God's longing to be known.

The Perfect Human through this developed self-consciousness and self-realization prompts divine self-manifestation. This causes the Perfect Human to be of both divine and earthly origin, al-Arabi calls him the Isthmus. Being the Isthmus between heaven and Earth the perfect human fulfills God's desire to be known and God's presence can be realized through him by others. Additionally through self manifestation one acquires divine knowledge, which is the primordial spirit of Muhammad and all its perfection. Al-Arabi details that the perfect human is of the cosmos to the divine and conveys the divine spirit to the cosmos.

== The contribution of al-Jili ==
Abd al-Karim b. Ibrahim al-Jili was born in 1365 and was a Sunni Sufi who spent much of his life in Yemen being taught by the Shaiyk Sharaf al-Din al-Jabarti.

== See also ==
- Al-Aḥzāb
- Pontifical and Promethean man
- Qutb
