= Scientia sacra =

Form of spiritual knowledge

In perennial philosophy, scientia sacra or sacred science is a form of spiritual knowledge that lies at the heart of divine revelations and traditional sciences, embodying the essential core of every sacred tradition. It recognizes sources of knowledge beyond those accepted by modern epistemology, such as divine revelations and intellectual intuition. Intellectual intuition is believed to allow access to an innate knowledge of God, which is to be reawakened through the use of human intellect. The principles and doctrines of scientia sacra are derived from reason, revelation, and intellectual intuition, with the conviction that these sources of knowledge can be reconciled in a hierarchical order, and applied in the human quest to understand different orders of reality. Its objective is to show how the transmitted, intellectual, and physical sciences are related and unified within the framework of metaphysics, as traditionally defined.

According to this perspective, scientia sacra is synonymous with metaphysics, which is seen not as a branch of philosophy but rather what the Sufis call ma'rifa or gnostic knowledge—the ultimate goal of which is the knowledge of "the Real". It is based on a holistic and hierarchical view of reality that emphasizes the connections between the various levels and states of being. This viewpoint holds that God, the Principle or the One, is the Ultimate Reality—who is absolute, eternal, infinite, and necessary but whose knowledge lies beyond the reach of sense perception and reason. According to the doctrines of scientia sacra, the universe is not a separate reality, but rather only a "manifestation and theophany" of the "Divine Essence", which is essentially the source and center of all other realities.

The notion of scientia sacra may be traced back to Islamic intellectual tradition, particularly the ideas of Ibn Arabi and Suhrawardi. This was further explored in modern times by the French metaphysician René Guénon and others, including Frithjof Schuon and Titus Burckhardt. However, the concept was most notably conceptualized in contemporary language by the Iranian philosopher Seyyed Hossein Nasr in his 1981 Gifford Lectures, published in the same year as Knowledge and the Sacred. He elaborated further on the concept of sacred science in his 1993 book The Need for a Sacred Science.

== Terminology ==
Scientia sacra is a Latin term that means "sacred science". Although Nasr employs the terms "scientia sacra", "sacred science" and "sacred knowledge" interchangeably, he prefers the term "scientia sacra" to others because he thinks the word "science" in modern English usage can be misleading. For Nasr, "scientia sacra" refers to the ultimate metaphysical science that encompasses the "principial knowledge of things", while "sacred science" pertains to the application of sacred knowledge to different dimensions of reality, both physical and spiritual. The terms "scientia sacra", "sacred knowledge", "philosophia perennis", "perennial philosophy", "sophia", "sophia perennis", "metaphysics", "esoteric knowledge", and "principial knowledge" are all consanguineous terms and relate to the "eternal Truth", which Nasr claims is at the heart of authentic religions and manifests itself in the form of "sacred traditions". For Nasr, this Truth is attainable by everyone through intellect.

== Origins ==
Scientia sacra is not a new idea. It has its origins in the Islamic philosophical tradition, or, more broadly, in the traditional thought and culture. Asfa Widiyanto attributes the notion to Suhrawardi's theory of al-ilm al-huduri (knowledge by presence). Suhrawardi defined al-ilm al-huduri as knowledge that is self-evident, self-present, and self-objective – which indicates that consciousness and cognizable reality are one and the same. Such knowledge is acquired through intellection, which Suhrawardi defines as a sort of vision that allows humans to perceive archetypes in the imaginal realm (alam al-mithal, or mundus imaginalis in Henry Corbin's terminology). The notion of scientia sacra may also be traced back to Ibn Arabi's concept of "intuitive science", which he viewed as knowledge of the Truth, of the reality of all things. Ibn Arabi frequently refers to such knowledge as ma'rifa, which he connects with divine wisdom.

According to the Encyclopedia of Science and Religion, Seyyed Hossein Nasr has championed the concept of "Sacred Science", which has its roots first and foremost in the thought of French metaphysicist René Guénon, and then in authors who followed in his footsteps, such as, Frithjof Schuon and Titus Burckhardt.

Guénon explained how modern Western civilization is an anomaly insofar as it is the only civilization in the world that developed without reference to transcendence. Guénon mentions the universal teaching of humanity's religions and traditions, all of which are nothing but adaptations of the original—essentially metaphysical—tradition. The destiny of human beings is the intellectual knowledge of eternal truths, not the exploration of the quantitative aspects of the cosmos. In this context, Nasr denounces....Western societies that are obsessed with developing a scientific knowledge anchored in a quantitative approach to reality and in the domination of nature, which results in its pure and simple destruction.

— Bruno Guiderdoni, Encyclopedia of Science and Religion, 2003

Soumaya Pernilla Ouis credits Nasr for introducing the concept of scientia sacra. According to Nidhal Guessoum, Seyyed Hossein Nasr "almost single-handedly" developed the concept of sacred science, which was afterwards embraced and upheld by a number of his followers. (Note: Nidhal Guessoum: "Sacred science, which Seyyed Hossein Nasr developed almost single-handedly (though it was later adopted and defended by several of his disciples)." Soumaya Pernilla Ouis: "The well-known Muslim scholar, Seyyed Hossein Nasr has introduced the concept of scientia sacra and defined it as the sacred knowledge which lies at the heart of every revelation and is the centre of that circle which encompasses and defines tradition.") Nasr developed his notion of scientia sacra in his book Knowledge and the Sacred, originally published in 1981, which contained his Gifford lectures delivered in the same year. He expanded on his idea of sacred science in his 1993 book The Need for a Sacred Science.

== Meaning ==
Scientia sacra has been described as "the heart of perennial philosophy", the ultimate purpose of which is the "discernment of the Real". According to Nasr, scientia sacra – or knowledge of Reality – is "at the heart of every revelation and is the center of that circle which encompasses and defines tradition." For him, this knowledge is identical with metaphysics as traditionally defined – that is, "as the ultimate science of the Real" – or marifa (Gnostic knowledge) in Sufi terminology, and not as a branch of philosophy as is understood in the contemporary world. Nasr describes metaphysics as the knowledge that allows man to "distinguish between the Real and the Illusory" and provides him with the ability "to know things in their essence or as they are", which is essentially the same as knowing them "in divinis".

The knowledge of the Principle which is at once the absolute and infinite Reality is the heart of metaphysics while the distinction between the levels of universal and cosmic existence, including both the macrocosm and the microcosm, are like its limbs. Metaphysics concerns not only the Principle in Itself and its manifestations but also the principles of the various sciences of a cosmological order.

— Seyyed Hossein Nasr quoted in Adnan Aslan, Religious Pluralism in Christian and Islamic Philosophy: The Thought of John Hick and Seyyed Hossein Nasr, 2004

According to The Encyclopedia of Philosophy, Nasr's ultimate aim is "to revive scientia sacra (sacred science) by showing the underlying unity and interrelatedness of the transmitted, intellectual, and physical sciences under the umbrella of metaphysics". This metaphysics "is centered around a holistic and hierarchic view of reality" that shows the "interrelatedness of the various levels and states of being", with the idea of the great chain of being serving as its "conceptual spine". It is heavily influenced by traditional theocentrism that regards God or the One as the origin, center, and culmination of everything that exists. Although this principle is expressed in a wide variety of ways throughout various traditions, it always retains its basic meaning. In line with premodern philosophy, it upholds that "the spiritual has a higher ontological status over the material because the former is taken to reveal the divine and the latter to conceal it". For Nasr, "every level of reality has its own meaning and place in the total economy of divine creation". They cannot, therefore, be reduced to a single plane. According to Nasr, the premodern sciences of nature were able to avoid becoming reductionist and materialistic because of their teleological and hierarchical perspective of the universe.

In Nasr's view, scientia sacra perceives the cosmos not as a separate reality, but rather as a "manifestation and theophany" of the "Divine Essence". It is comparable to Plato's idea that the "immaterial realm" is "concrete reality". From a metaphysical perspective, God is seen as concrete Reality, whereas other realities are regarded as abstractions of God. Nasr believes that scientia sacra is more than just a theoretical conception of Reality. It has a practical aspect in that it aids man in his quest of the sacred. As a result, its explanations can serve as a catalyst for exposing the human mind to the higher order of reality. According to Nasr, "scientia sacra contains both the seed and the fruit of the knowledge tree." He describes its seed as theoretical knowledge and its fruit as realized gnosis. From an axiological point of view, scientia sacra has a transformative function, that is, it transforms the human person in order for them to attain the sacred.

.....although knowledge of the universe can be attained through those sciences which are based on sense perception and reason, knowledge of the ultimate reality or God can be achieved only through what is known as sacred knowledge (scientia sacra). The reason for this is that the universe constitutes a veil which hides and conceals the Ultimate Reality of which it is a manifestation. None of the sciences based on sense perception and reason can pierce this veil, and it is thus only by means of sacred knowledge that the Ultimate Reality can be apprehended.

— Nicholas Heer, Review of Knowledge and the Sacred, 1993

In Nasr's view, knowledge of the Ultimate Reality is only possible if one actively participates "in one's inmost being, in that supraindividual reality". For him, "Self Knowledge" is the ultimate or most interior form of knowledge, and that one can attain it "through the sun of the Divine Self residing at the center of the human soul."

== Epistemological perspectives ==
Scientia sacra varies from discursive knowledge in that it recognizes sources of knowledge other than those recognized by contemporary epistemology. According to Nasr, the sources of "ordinary knowledge", as defined by modern epistemology, are sense perception and inductive reasoning, but the sources of sacred knowledge are revelation and intellectual intuition, together with reason and sense perception. Nasr contends that unlike other forms of knowledge, which are based on speculation or reasoning about the subject matter, sacred knowledge is centered on intuition. He believes that reasoning originates in the mind, while intellection emerges from the heart, which enlightens the mind of the individual in question. According to Nasr, this does not imply that it is unintelligible. For him, knowledge acquired through intellectual intuition is intelligible in and of itself. The human intelligence that receives this knowledge "does not impose upon it the intellectual nature or content of a spiritual experience of a sapiential character". Human intelligence does not serve as a source, but rather as a participant in the formation of such knowledge, since, in Nasr's view, "consciousness is reality and knowledge is being".

Intellect, for Nasr, is the very substance that lies within man's being and is concerned with unveiling archetypal realities. It is what the Sufis refer to as the "eye of the heart" (ayn al-qalb), which is "the microcosmic projection of the Divine Intellect". In light of this, it can by definition serve as a "source of inner illumination or inner revelation". Reason, on the other hand, is a manifestation of the intellect. In Nasr's view, intellection is the process through which our individual consciousness participates in Divine Consciousness. This method transcends logic and grasps reality without disturbing its harmony. It arrives at the truth by an a priori intuitive perception of it. This demonstrates Nasr's Platonic resemblance in that it preserves the notion of primordial knowledge and truth contained within man's being. However, humanity has "become removed from that primordial state" or fitra, in which human intellect had direct access to knowledge of the sacred. They now require revelation for utilizing their divine gifts. The act of intellection thus refers to the process of invoking and activating of this fundamental knowledge that is at the heart of man's intellect, which is essentially a reflection of the Divine Intellect. For Nasr, Divine Intellect is the source of all knowledge and being, and revelation that comes from it is the divine aid for the human intellect. According to William Chittick, "intellect is nothing but the soul that has come to know and realize its full potential". This potential is often referred to as fitra or innate disposition in the Islamic tradition. The fitra is the original self of Adam, who God "taught all the names" to (2:31) in the Quran. Every human being has this primordial Adam within them. The fitra is naturally inclined towards tawhid, which is the foundation for acquiring true knowledge of God, the universe, and oneself. Essentially, the fitra is good and wise, as it leads one towards tawhid and the pursuit of true knowledge.

=== Traditional sciences and scientia sacra ===
Nasr's construction of traditional science may be seen through its ontological, epistemological, and axiological foundations. Unlike modern science, traditional science recognizes the direct connection between "hierarchical degrees of being" and "hierarchical degrees of knowing" at the ontological level. It is never divorced from its metaphysical foundations, and is epistemologically based on the "dialectics of revelation, intellect, and reason". Nasr considers scientia sacra, which deals with the Real, as the supreme form of knowledge that lies at the heart of traditional sciences. Insofar as they apply the immutable metaphysical principles to the world of temporality and change, natural, mathematical, or intellectual sciences that place the sacred at the center of their structure are regarded as sacred. All sacred sciences can be classified as traditional sciences since they apply the traditional metaphysical principles to the scientific study of nature, and therefore can be characterized as different forms of applied metaphysics.

The ‘Sacred Science’ approach of Seyyed Hossein Nasr, Frithjof Schuon and others thus takes an exception to the advancements in modern science and considers it as anomalous and responsible both for disconnecting man from God and for major environmental and social ills, fragmentation and disorder. According to this view, whereas modern science pursues objectives such as accuracy and confirmation by repeatability, scientific thinking in Islamic civilisation considered nature as sacred and consequently gave priority to values such as purpose, meaning and beauty.

— Hasan, U.; Osama, A., Muslim Responses to Science's Big Questions: Report of the Ihsanoglu Task Force on Islam & Science, 2016

However, Nasr does not dismiss modern science, which he believes "is legitimate if kept within the boundaries defined by the limitations of its own philosophical premises concerning the nature of physical reality as well as its epistemologies and methodologies." In this perspective, the sacred sciences, from cosmology to medicine, share a set of cardinal principles. The sacred sciences view the universe through the viewpoint of a hierarchy of existence and knowledge. The physical universe is not dismissed as an illusion, maya, or a shadow to be reduced in the presence of the Absolute. It is also not seen an ultimate reality by itself.

Were a true metaphysics, a scientia sacra, to become once again a living reality in the West, knowledge gained of man [and nature] through scientific research could be integrated into a pattern which would also embrace other forms of knowledge ranging from the purely metaphysical to those derived from traditional schools of psychology and cosmology. But in the field of the sciences of man, as in that of the sciences of nature, the great impediment is precisely the monolithic and monopolistic character which modern Western science has displayed since the seventeenth century.

— Seyyed Hossein Nasr quoted in Ali Zaidi, Muslim Reconstructions of Knowledge: The Cases of Nasr and al-Faruqi, 2011

Traditional civilizations that nurtured sacred sciences emphasized on the divine origin of the cosmos and maintained a hierarchy between the absolute and the relative, the eternal and the temporal, the necessary and the contingent. For Nasr, traditional sciences are inherently anti-reductionist since hierarchy entails a multilayered structure. This largely explains the continuity of the concept of the "great chain of being" throughout traditional civilizations that does not allow reality to be reduced to a "pure idea" or "pure matter". The sacred sciences study each domain of reality on its own level, instead of reducing reality to a material existence, relying on a metaphysical framework that allows the One and the Many to coexist without contradiction.

According to this perspective, nature is viewed as a sacred entity, as vestigia Dei or as ayat Allah (signs of God). Traditional sciences see nature as the abode of both change and permanence, in opposition to modern science, which reduces the order of nature to perpetual change and impermanence. Although nature is commonly seen as a "perennially changing structure", the "world of nature" also exhibits extraordinary continuity, persistence, and harmony, as evidenced by the preservation of species and the longevity of natural forms. This dual aspects of nature, according to Nasr, proves beyond doubt the Divine character in nature: the world of nature has not been consigned to the unending sequence of random and senseless changes that allow no telos in the universe. Nature, on the other hand, incorporates both the principles of change and permanence and alludes to a "big picture" in which all of its components are viewed as constituting a meaningful unity and harmony.

== Other developments ==
The Hungarian philosopher Béla Hamvas, who was influenced by René Guénon and his traditionalist school, undertook a study of various religious and spiritual traditions from around the world, which he compiled under the title Scientia Sacra. His three volume works, the first two of which were composed in the years 1943 and 1944 and the third, incomplete, in the early 1960s, were published posthumously in 1988. According to The Handbook of Contemporary European Social Theory, Hamvas's Scientia Sacra contains "an overview of the wisdom contained in the sacred tradition of mankind". In this work, Hamvas made an effort to demonstrate the connections between metaphysics, anthropology, and culture.

== See also ==
- Resacralization of knowledge
- Resacralization of nature
- Fitra
- Dhikr
- 'Aql

== Sources ==
- Allen, Micheal (2003). "Seyyed Hossein Nasr". In Dematteis, Philip B.; McHenry, Leemon B. (eds.). Dictionary of Literary Biography. Gale. ISBN 978-0787660239.
- Aslan, Adnan (2004). Religious Pluralism in Christian and Islamic Philosophy: The Thought of John Hick and Seyyed Hossein Nasr. London: Routledge. ISBN 978-1-138-99725-7.
- Burrel, David (2000). "Islamic Philosophical Theology". In Hahn, Lewis Edwin; Auxier, Randall E.; Stone Jr., Lucian W. (eds.). The Philosophy of Seyyed Hossein Nasr. Open Court. ISBN 978-0812694147.
- Chittick, W.C. (2007). Science of the Cosmos, Science of the Soul: The Pertinence of Islamic Cosmology in the Modern World. Oneworld Publications. ISBN 978-1-85168-495-3.
- Deutsch, Eliot (2000). "Seyyed Hossein Nasr's Philosophy of Art". In Hahn, Lewis Edwin; Auxier, Randall E.; Stone Jr., Lucian W. (eds.). The Philosophy of Seyyed Hossein Nasr. Open Court. ISBN 978-0812694147.
- Gangadean, A.K. (2009). "The Quest for the Universal Global Science". Meditations of Global First Philosophy: Quest for the Missing Grammar of Logos. SUNY series in Western Esoteric Traditions. State University of New York Press. ISBN 978-0-7914-7606-2.
- Guessoum, Nidhal (2014). "Islam and Science". In S. Fuller; M. Stenmark; Zackariasson, U. (eds.). The Customization of Science: The Impact of Religious and Political Worldviews on Contemporary Science. Palgrave Macmillan UK. ISBN 978-1-137-37961-0.
- Guiderdoni, Bruno (2003). "Islam, Contemporary Issues in Science and Religion". Encyclopedia of Science and Religion. Biography In Context + The Complete Marquis Who's Who. Macmillan Reference. ISBN 978-0-02-865705-9.
- Hasan, U.; Osama, A. (2016). "Muslim Responses to Science's Big Questions: Summary Report". In Hasan, U.; A., Usama (eds.). Muslim Responses to Science's Big Questions: Report of the Ihsanoglu Task Force on Islam & Science. Muslim World Science Initiative.
- Heer, Nicholas (1993). "Book Reviews: Knowledge and the Sacred". Philosophy East and West. 43 (1): 144–150. doi:10.2307/1399476. JSTOR 1399476.
- Kalin, Ibrahim (2006). "Nasr, Seyyed Hossein". Encyclopedia of Philosophy. Macmillan Reference USA. ISBN 978-0-02-865787-5.
- Kalin, Ibrahim (2000). "The Sacred versus The Secular: Nasr on Science". In Hahn, Lewis Edwin; Auxier, Randall E.; Stone Jr., Lucian W. (eds.). The Philosophy of Seyyed Hossein Nasr. Open Court. ISBN 978-0812694147.
- Nasr, S.H. (1989). Knowledge and the Sacred. Gifford lectures. State University of New York Press. ISBN 978-0-7914-0176-7.
- King, Sallie B. (2000). "The Philosophia Perennis and the Religions of the World". In Hahn, Lewis Edwin; Auxier, Randall E.; Stone Jr., Lucian W. (eds.). The Philosophy of Seyyed Hossein Nasr. Open Court. ISBN 978-0812694147.
- Ouis, Soumaya Pernilla (1998). "Islamic Ecotheology based on the Qur'an". Islamic Studies. 37 (2). Islamic Research Institute: 151–181. ISSN 0578-8072. JSTOR 20836989.
- Lanzetta, Beverly J. (1996). "The Mystical Basis of Panikkar's Thought". In Prabhu, J. (ed.). The Intercultural Challenge of Raimon Panikkar. Faith meets faith. Orbis Books. ISBN 978-1-57075-056-4.
- Roszkowski, W.; Kofman, J. (2016). Biographical Dictionary of Central and Eastern Europe in the Twentieth Century. Taylor & Francis. ISBN 978-1-317-47594-1.
- Saeed, A. (2006). Islamic Thought: An Introduction. Taylor & Francis. ISBN 978-1-134-22565-1.
- Sayem, Md. Abu (2019). "The Eco-Philosophy of Seyyed Hossein Nasr". Islamic Studies. 58 (2): 271–295. ISSN 2710-5326.
- Smith, Huston (1984). "Knowledge and the Sacred". Philosophy East and West. 34 (1). JSTOR. doi:10.2307/1398496. ISSN 0031-8221. JSTOR 1398496.
- Smith, Jane I. (1991). "Seyyed Hossein Nasr: Defender of the Sacred and Islamic Traditionalism". In Haddad, Yvonne (ed.). The Muslims in America. Oxford University Press.
- Szőnyi, György Endre (2018). ""His Dark Materials": The Early Apocalypticism of Enoch Recycled in Modern and Postmodern Times". The Apocalyptic Complex: Perspectives, Histories, Persistence. Central European University Press. ISBN 978-615-5225-38-3.
- Widiyanto, Asfa (2017). "Traditional science and scientia sacra: Origin and dimensions of Seyyed Hossein Nasr's concept of science". Intellectual Discourse. 25 (1): 247–272.
- Wydra, Harald; Szakolczai, Arpad (2006). "Contemporary East Central European social theory". Handbook of Contemporary European Social Theory. Taylor & Francis. ISBN 978-1-134-25546-7.
- Zaidi, Ali (2011). "Muslim Reconstructions of Knowledge: The Cases of Nasr and al-Faruqi". Islam, Modernity, and the Human Sciences. New York: Palgrave Macmillan US. pp. 53–80. doi:10.1057/9780230118997_3. ISBN 978-1-349-29281-3.
