= The Need for a Sacred Science =

1993 book by Seyyed Hossein Nasr

The Need for a Sacred Science is a 1993 book by the Iranian philosopher Seyyed Hossein Nasr.

== See also ==
- Knowledge and the Sacred

== Sources ==
- Heinen, Anton (1994). "The Need for a Sacred Science. Seyyed Hossein Nasr". Isis. 85 (4). University of Chicago Press: 681–682. doi:10.1086/356997. ISSN 0021-1753.
- Omar, Lrfan A. (1995). "The Need for a Sacred Science". American Journal of Islam and Society. 12 (2). International Institute of Islamic Thought: 263–267. doi:10.35632/ajis.v12i2.2377. ISSN 2690-3741.
- Eaton, Gai (1994). "Reflection on The Need for a Sacred Science and A Young Muslim's Guide to the Modern World". Islamic Quarterly. 38 (2). Informa UK Limited: 133.
