= Desacralization of knowledge =

Process of separation of knowledge from its divine source

In traditionalist philosophy, desacralization of knowledge or secularization of knowledge is the process of separation of knowledge from its perceived divine source – God or the Ultimate Reality. The process reflects a paradigm shift in modern conception of knowledge in that it has rejected divine revelations as well as the idea of spiritual and metaphysical foundations of knowledge, confining knowledge to empirical domain and reason alone.

The theme of desacralization frequently appears among Traditionalist writers, starting with French metaphysician René Guénon, who earlier spoke of "the limitation of knowledge to its lowest order." Iranian philosopher Seyyed Hossein Nasr most notably examined and defined the process of desacralization of knowledge in his 1981 Gifford Lectures, which were later published as Knowledge and the Sacred.

== Origin of the concept ==
The theme of desacralization of knowledge has been an important topic among writers of the traditionalist school, (Note: According to Aalia Sohail Khan, traditionalists condemned "profane philosophy" and scientism "as the only legitimate manner of knowing the different levels of reality". Relying on the traditionalist framework, she argues that the "degeneration of science into scientism desacralizes knowledge as well as language". The sole dependence on science in the form of "scientific materialism" results in a truncated view of reality and Truth, obliterating the spiritual, moral, and ethical aspects of life. She says traditionalists critiqued modern science for "its reductionism and its imperial conceit and pretensions in claiming to be the only mode of knowing." In contrast to postmodern critiques, which focus solely on the social and political repercussions of modernity, their main criticism of modern science was that it lacked metaphysical principles and was disconnected from the Transcendental order and spiritual perspective. Their large body of work is founded on the "primacy of transcendence, sacred knowledge, value, truth and meaning created through intuition and revelation.") going back to the French mystic and intellectual René Guénon, who previously spoke of "the limitation of knowledge to its lowest order", that is, the reduction of knowledge to "the empirical and analytic study". However, the systematic conceptualization of the desacralization of knowledge or secularization of knowledge was first introduced by the Iranian philosopher Seyyed Hossein Nasr in his 1981 Gifford Lectures. (Note: Damian Howard states: "In Knowledge and the Sacred, Nasr, rather than start with the essentials of perennialist metaphysics, feels the need to explain at great length the ‘desacralization of knowledge’ and the subsequent ‘rediscovery of the sacred’. In other words, he seeks to explain to the western reader why they will not be able to grasp the truth of his substantial teaching." Alain Daniélou: "An intensive and well-documented analysis of the desacralization process in the West can be found in the first chapter of Seyyed Hossein Nasr’s Knowledge and Sacred, entitled "Knowledge and its Desacralization’ (Buffalo, N.Y.: State University of New York Press, 1989).") (Note: Adnan Aslan, for example, comments that "The secularization process first began when a line was drawn between the realm of the sacred and the realm of the profane." Humans asserted their freedom from God in a rebellion against Heaven. As a result, "the sacred qualities of the human faculty of knowledge were ignored, thereby initiating the process of secularization of knowledge." In his review of Knowledge and the Sacred, Gerald Largo states that Nasr analyzes "the causes of the intellectual and spiritual chaos of modern times, namely, the eclipse of the sapiential dimension and the secularization of knowledge.") These lectures were subsequently published as a book titled "Knowledge and the Sacred".

== Themes ==
According to Nasr, desacralization of knowledge is one of the most significant aspects of secularism, which he defines as "everything whose origin is merely human and therefore non-divine and whose metaphysical basis lies in [its] ontological hiatus between man and God". The core idea of desacralization of knowledge is that modern civilization has lost the transcendent dimensions of knowledge, which are based on revelation and intellection, by confining knowledge solely to rational and empirical domains.

[Nasr's] central thesis is that true knowledge is profoundly and by its very essence related to the sacred. This idea, he argues, underlies the basic teachings of every traditional religion whether Hinduism, Buddhism, Taoism, Zoroastrianism, Judaism, Islam or Christianity. Only in the Modern world, which he dates from the Renaissance, has the connection between knowledge and the sacred been lost.

— Micheal Allen, Dictionary of Literary Biography, 2003

In Nasr's exposition, the terms "to know" and "knowledge" forfeit their unidimensional character. In his view, knowledge proceeds in a hierarchical order from empirical and rational modes of knowing to the supreme form of knowledge which he calls the "unitive knowledge" or "al-ma’rifah". Similarly, "to know" begins with ratiocination and progresses to intellection, a process that entails the attainment of spiritual knowledge through the human intellect—the perceived "universal faculty which is within the individual yet transcends his individuality". Nasr argues that while human beings possess the intellect, which is a divine gift that shines within their being, they are unable to fully utilize this gift because they have become too distant from their original nature or fitrah. He contends that as knowledge is inseparable from being, it is inherently connected to the sacred, which is synonymous with the Ultimate Reality. To be human is to know, which ultimately means knowing the Supreme Self—God—who is the source of all knowledge and consciousness. According to Nasr, it is the post-medieval process of secularization and a humanism that have eventually forced the separation of knowledge from being and intelligence from the Sacred, which "is both the Knower and the Known, inner consciousness and outer reality".

Knowledge of the Absolute means knowledge of the existence of superior spiritual levels, of the interrelatedness of the phenomena of nature, of the interrelatedness of their respective elements, and most importantly, of the derivation of everything from the Absolute itself. However, the awareness (and therefore the usage) of Intellect according to Nasr has been lost, together with the awareness of the Absolute itself. In Nasr’s reconstruction such oblivion characterizes the whole course of human thought that, in its dominant manifestations, can be described as a continuous desacralization of knowledge.

— Stefano Bigliardi, Above Analysis and Amazement. Some Contemporary Muslim Characterizations of "Miracle" and their Interpretation, 2014

In Nasr's view, modern science has reduced multiple domains of reality to a psycho-physical one. In the absence of a spiritual vision, science is said to become concerned with changes in the material world alone. According to this viewpoint, since modern science has rejected the notion of a hierarchy of being, scientific theories and discoveries are no longer capable of appreciating the truths that belong to a higher order of reality. Nasr thus views modern science as an "incomplete" or a "superficial science" that is only concerned with certain parts of reality while invalidating others. It is believed to be founded on the distinction between the knowing subject and the known object. This perspective maintains that modern science has lost its symbolic spirit and the transcendental dimension because it has repudiated the role of intellect in pursuing knowledge and truth by adopting a purely quantitative method. Nasr blames secularism for the desacralization of science and knowledge. In this process, science and knowledge is said to become separated, losing the uniformity that they had in the form of traditional sacred knowledge. According to Nasr, the structure of reality remains constant, but human perception and vision of that reality change. Modern Western philosophy, with no perceived sense of permanence, has reduced reality to a temporal process. According to Jane I. Smith, this reductionism is what Nasr identifies as the desacralization of knowledge and the loss of the sense of the sacred, necessitating a choice between a form of knowledge that tends to focus on change, multiplicity, and outwardness, and "one that integrates change within the eternal, multiplicity within unity, and outward facts within inward principles."

== Historical development ==
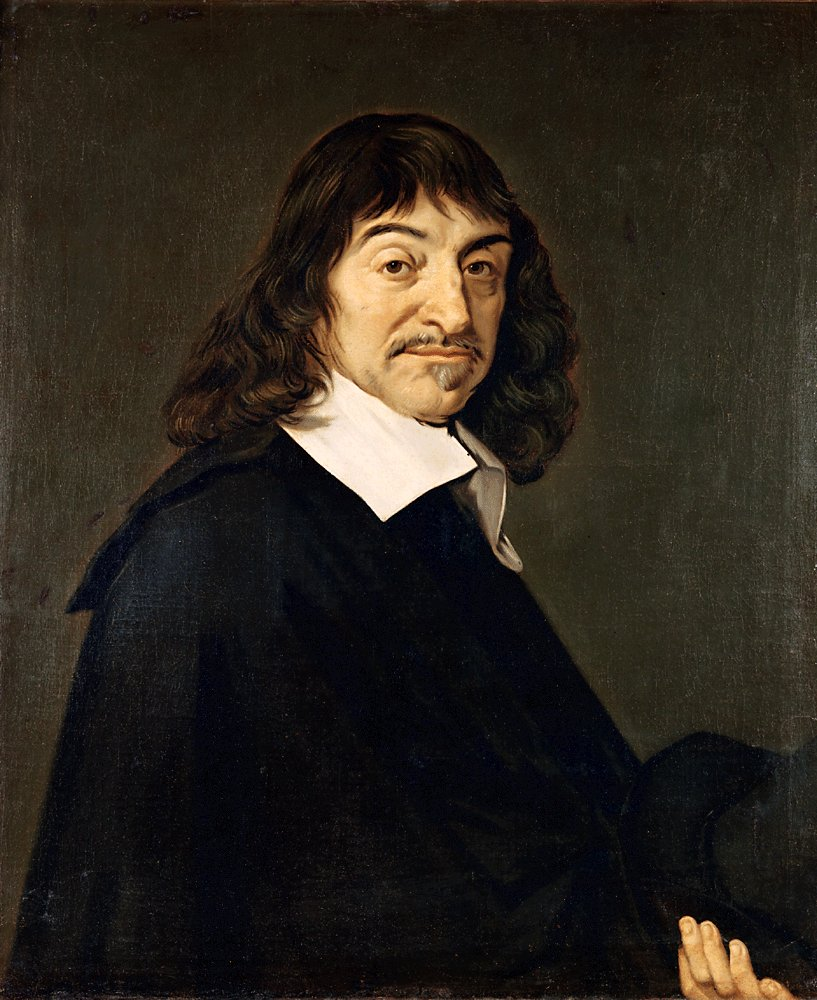
In saying "I think, therefore I am," Nasr contends, Descartes was not alluding to the "divine I" who proclaimed "I am the Truth" (ana’l-Haqq) through the mouth of Mansur al-Hallaj seven centuries before Descartes, the Divine Self which alone has the authority to proclaim I.

The process of desacralization of knowledge began with the ancient Greeks. According to Nasr, the rationalists and skeptics of ancient Greek philosophical traditions played a major role in the process of desacralization by reducing knowledge either to ratiocination or to cognitive exercise. In substituting reason for intellect and sensuous knowledge for inner illumination, the Greeks pioneered the process of desacralization of knowledge. Other major stages in the process of desacralization include the formation of Renaissance philosophical systems that had developed a concept of nature, which is independent and self-creative. The process, however, reached its climax in the thought of René Descartes, "the father of modern Western philosophy," who "made thinking of the individual ego the center of reality and criterion of all knowledge". Thereafter, knowledge eventually became rooted in the cogito. According to the Dictionary of Literary Biography:

Nasr analyzes the modern desacralization of knowledge and the consequent eclipse of human intelligence ... ]The roots of the crisis, he says, go back as far as the rationalists and skeptics of ancient Greece, but more immediate and grave in effect was the humanism of the Renaissance which shifted the focus of knowledge from God to human beings and from the sacred cosmos to the secular order, and the full blown rationalism of the Enlightenment which reduced human knowledge to reason alone. Nasr contends that epistemology since Descartes has taken an increasingly reductionist trajectory in which the traditional doctrine of knowledge rooted in intellection and revelation was replaced by an idolatry of reason. Rationalism gave way to empiricism, with its tendency to reject metaphysics altogether; and empiricism has been followed by various forms of irrationalism, including existentialism and deconstructionism. The general course of modern history has been one of desacralization and decay, robbing humanity of intelligence and stripping the cosmos of beauty and meaning.

— Micheal Allen, Dictionary of Literary Biography, 2003

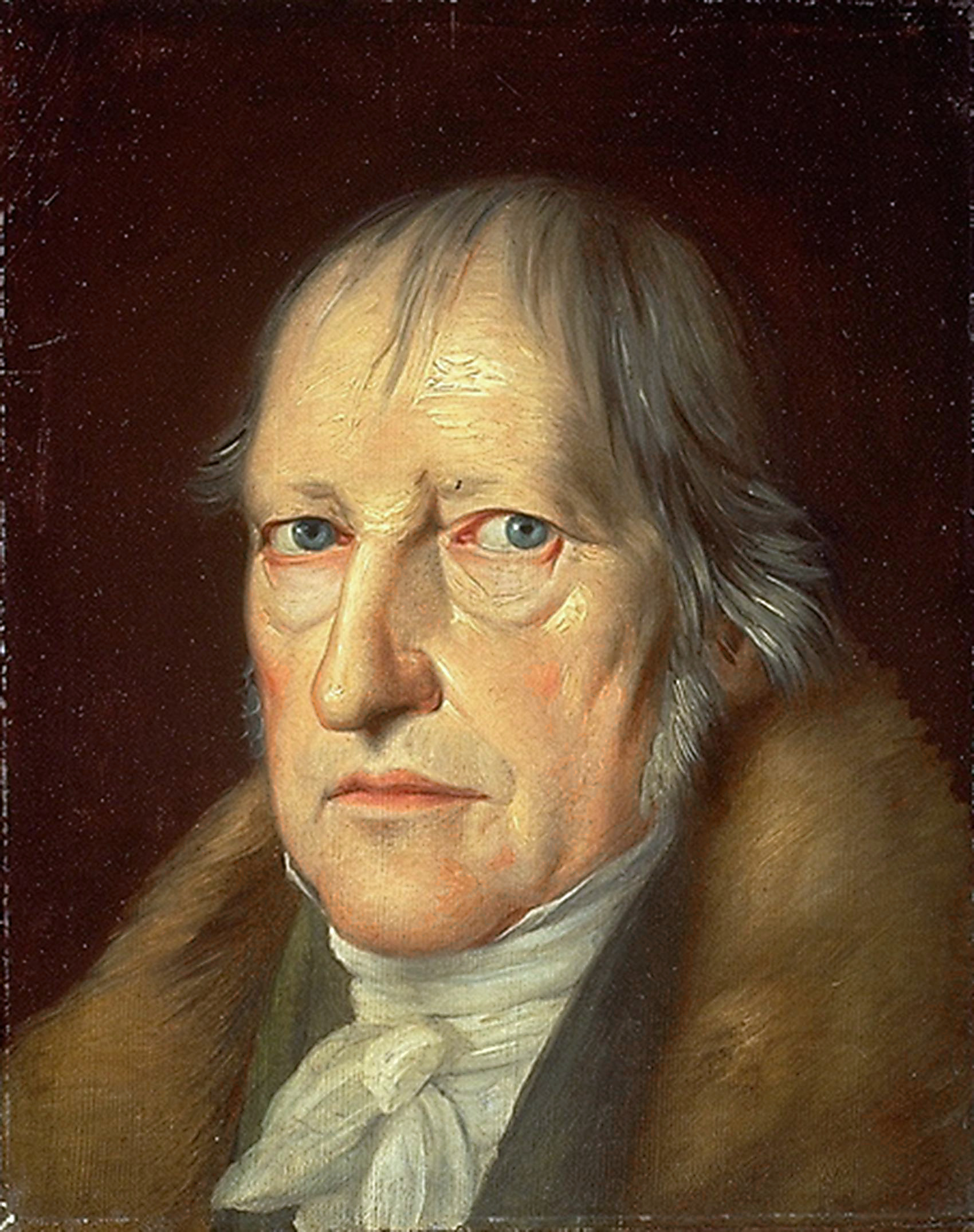
Hegel is said to have taken a decisive step in the process of desacralization, turning the whole process of knowledge into a dialectic inseparable from change and becoming.

In his contribution to the volume of the Library of Living Philosophers, which was devoted to Nasr's life and thought, Liu Shu-hsien, a Neo-Confucian philosopher, writes:

Nasr's critique of modem European philosophy has also presented a very interesting perspective. He pointed out that Descartes's individual was not referring to Atman or the divine I, but rather the "illusory" self, which was placing its experience and consciousness of thinking as the foundation of all epistemology and ontology and the source of certitude. After the Humean doubt, Kant taught an agnosticism which in a characteristically subjective fashion denied to the intellect the possibility of knowing the essence of things. This situation further deteriorated into the Hegelian and Marxist dialectics, as they denied that there is anything immutable behind the appearance, and this loss of the sense of permanence was characteristic of mainstream thought of modern Western philosophy. In the analytic philosophy and irrational philosophies that followed, the sacred quality of knowledge was completely destroyed.

— Liu Shu-hsien, Reflections on Tradition and Modernity: A Response to Seyyed Hossein Nasr from Neo-Confucian Perspective, 2000

One "powerful instrument" of desacralization in history includes the theory of evolution, which according to Nasr "is a desperate attempt to substitute a set of horizontal, material causes in a unidimensional world to explain effects whose causes belong to other levels of reality, to the vertical dimensions of existence". He says the theory of evolution, and its use by modernists and liberal theologians including Aurobindo Ghose and Pierre Teilhard de Chardin has been a "major force" in the process of desacralization of knowledge. According to David Burrell, the "roots of the betrayal" may be found "on the other side of Descartes", in the high scholasticism that includes the thought of Thomas Aquinas, Bonaventure and Duns Scotus. According to Nasr, their syntheses "tended to become over-rationalistic in imprisoning intuitions of a metaphysical order in syllogistic categories which were to hide, rather than reveal, their properly speaking intellectual rather than purely rational character".

== Effects ==
For Nasr, the adoption of the rationalist branch of ancient Greek philosophy, particularly Aristotle (above), led to a shift away from sacred knowledge in the West.

According to the traditional perspective, externalization and desacralization of knowledge has led to the belief all that can be understood is science in terms of information, quantification, analysis and their subsequent technological implications. The questions of religion, God, eternal life and the nature of the soul are all outside the realm of scientific knowledge and thus are only matters of faith. The desacralized knowledge is said to have affected all areas of culture, including art, science and religion, and has also had an impact on human nature. This account maintains that the effect of desacralized, profane knowledge is felt within the value system, thought processes and structure of feelings. Nasr says the desacralized knowledge and science affects the use of technology and has resulted in ecological catastrophes. It results in highly compartmentalized science whose ignorance of the divine destroys the outward and inward spiritual ambience of humans.

== Reception ==
According to Liu Shu-hsien, the process of desacralization of knowledge is not as bad as Nasr has anticipated. Shu-hsien says there is an overwhelming necessity for desacralization of knowledge within the domain of empirical science because the quest of certainty is no longer a viable objective. According to David Harvey, the Enlightenment thought sought demystification and desacralization of knowledge, and social organization to free humans from their bonds. Svend Brinkmann says of the need for desacralization of knowledge; "if knowing is a human activity, it is always already situated somewhere – in some cultural, historical and social situation". For David Burrell, scholars are more at ease with Nasr's criticism of "enlightenment philosophical paradigm" in an explicitly postmodern world. Those who would argue "if knowledge cannot be secured in Descartes’s fashion, it cannot be secured at all" might have modern presumptions.

== Other scholarly trends ==
=== Maslow’s desacralization ===
The American psychologist Abraham Maslow's (1966) concept of desacralization is based on "the type of science that lacks emotion, joy, wonder, awe, and rapture". He urged scientists to reintroduce values, creativity, emotion, and ritual to their work. For this, science must be resacralized, which means it needs to be imbued with ritual, passion, and human values. Astronomers, for instance, need to be astounded by the stars as much as study them. Psychologists must appreciate, be excited about, be in awe of, and have affection for the people they examine.

=== Other accounts ===
Several other academics have discussed the theme of secularization of knowledge in a number of other contexts. In a 1989 paper, British historian of science John Hedley Brooke, for instance, described the secularization of knowledge in the context of the eighteenth century scientific developments, contending that the process of secularization of science is evident in the changes of the theories of matter, celestial mechanics, the earth sciences, and the life sciences. Brad S. Gregory, a history professor at the University of Notre Dame, sought to examine the impact of the Reformation era on the field of knowledge in his 2019 article, in an effort to demonstrate how "religious disagreements" within the Christian tradition opened the way for the secularization of knowledge.

== See also ==
- Disenchantment
- Secularization
- Scientia sacra

== Sources ==
- Alatas, Syed Farid (1995). "The Sacralization of the Social Sciences : a Critique of an Emerging Theme in Academic Discourse". Archives de sciences sociales des religions. 91: 89–111. doi:10.3406/assr.1995.996. S2CID 144680307.
- Alkatiri, Wardah (2016). "In Search of Suitable Knowledge: The Need of Ontological Epistemological Pluralism". International Journal of the Asian Philosophical Association. 9 (2): 197–230.
- Allen, Micheal (2003). "Seyyed Hossein Nasr". In Dematteis, Philip B.; McHenry, Leemon B. (eds.). Dictionary of Literary Biography. Gale. ISBN 978-0787660239.
- Aslan, Adnan (1998). "The Need for a Pluralistic Approach in Religion". Religious Pluralism in Christian and Islamic Philosophy: The Thought of John Hick and Seyyed Hossein Nasr. Routledge. ISBN 978-0700710256.
- Bigliardi, Stefano (2014). "The Contemporary Debate on the Harmony between Islam and Science: Emergence and Challenges of a New Generation". Social Epistemology: A Journal of Knowledge, Culture and Policy. 28 (2): 167–186. doi:10.1080/02691728.2013.782583. S2CID 144348104.
- Bigliardi, Stefano (2014a). "Above Analysis and Amazement. Some Contemporary Muslim Characterizations of "Miracle" and their Interpretation". Sophia. 53 (1): 113–129. doi:10.1007/s11841-013-0370-4. S2CID 144001330.
- Brinkmann, Svend (2012). Qualitative Inquiry in Everyday Life: Working with Everyday Life Materials. Sage. ISBN 978-0857024763.
- Brooke, John Hedley (1989). "Science and the Secularization of Knowledge: Perspectives on Some Eighteenth Century Transformations". Nuncius. 4 (1). Brill: 43–65. doi:10.1163/182539189x00022. ISSN 0394-7394.
- Burrel, David (2000). "Islamic Philosophical Theology". In Hahn, Lewis Edwin; Auxier, Randall E.; Stone Jr., Lucian W. (eds.). The Philosophy of Seyyed Hossein Nasr. Open Court. ISBN 978-0812694147.
- Chattopadhyaya, D.P.; Gupta, A.K.S. (2005). Self, Society, and Science: Theoretical and Historical Perspectives. Project of History of Indian Science, Philosophy and culture (PHISPC). ISBN 978-81-87586-20-3.
- Daniélou, A. (2005). India: A Civilization of Differences: The Ancient Tradition of Universal Tolerance. Inner Traditions/Bear. ISBN 978-1-62055-032-8.
- Danner, Victor (1982). "Book Reviews: Knowledge and the Sacred". The Muslim World. 72 (3–4): 247–248.
- Eaton, Gai (1983). "Knowledge and the Sacred: Reflections on Seyyed Hossein Nasr's Gifford Lectures". Studies in Comparative Religion. 15 (3–4).
- Feist, J.; Feist, G.; Roberts, T.A. (2014). Ebook: Theories of Personality. UK Higher Education Psychology Psychology. McGraw-Hill Education. ISBN 978-0-07-717187-2.
- Gregory, Brad S. (2019). "The Reformation Era and the Secularization of Knowledge". In Nord, Philip; Guenther, Katja; Weiss, Max (eds.). Formations of Belief: Historical Approaches to Religion and the Secular. Princeton University Press. doi:10.1515/9780691194165-010. ISBN 9780691194165. S2CID 240685414.
- Guenon, Rene (1927). "The Dark Age". The Crisis of the Modern World. Sophia Perennis; Revised Edition (June 24, 2004). ISBN 978-0900588242.
- Harvey, David (1991). "The passage from modernity to postmodernity in contemporary culture". The Condition of Postmodernity: An Enquiry into the Origins of Cultural Change. Wiley-Blackwell. ISBN 978-0631162940.
- Heer, Nicholas (1993). "Book Reviews: Knowledge and the Sacred". Philosophy East and West. 43 (1): 144–150. doi:10.2307/1399476. JSTOR 1399476.
- Howard, Damian (2011). "Defying the Immanent Frame". Being Human in Islam: The Impact of the Evolutionary Worldview. Routledge. ISBN 978-0415603683.
- Jawad, Haifaa (2005). "Seyyed Hossein Nasr and the Study of Religion in Contemporary Society". American Journal of Islam and Society. 22 (2): 49–68. doi:10.35632/ajis.v22i2.457.
- Khan, Aalia Sohail (2017). "Reduction of Science into Scientism" (PDF). Muslim Perspective. 2 (4): 70–87.
- Largo, Gerald A. (1982). "Review: Islamic Knowledge; Review of Knowledge and the Sacred by Seyyed Hossein Nasr". CrossCurrents. 32 (2): 219–221. JSTOR 24458501.
- Nasr, Seyyed Hossein (1989). "Knowledge and its Desacralization". Knowledge and the Sacred. State University of New York. ISBN 978-0791401774.
- Saltzman, Judy D. (2000). "The Concept of Spiritual Knowledge in the Philosophy of Seyyed Hossein Nasr". In Hahn, Lewis Edwin; Auxier, Randall E.; Stone Jr., Lucian W. (eds.). The Philosophy of Seyyed Hossein Nasr. Open Court. ISBN 978-0812694147.
- Stone, Lucian W. Jr. (2005). "Nasr, Seyyed Hossein". In Shook, John R. (ed.). The Dictionary of Modern American Philosophers. Thoemmes Continuum. ISBN 978-1843710370.
- Shu-hsien, Liu (2000). "Reflections on Tradition and Modernity: A Response to Seyyed Hossein Nasr from Neo-Confucian Perspective". In Hahn, Lewis Edwin; Auxier, Randall E.; Stone Jr., Lucian W. (eds.). The Philosophy of Seyyed Hossein Nasr. Open Court. ISBN 978-0812694147.
- Smith, Jane I. (1991). "Seyyed Hossein Nasr: Defender of the Sacred and Islamic Traditionalism". In Haddad, Yvonne (ed.). The Muslims in America. Oxford University Press.
- Stenberg, Leif (1996). "Seyyed Hossein Nasr and Ziauddin Sardar on Islam and science: Marginalization or modernization of a religious tradition". Social Epistemology: A Journal of Knowledge, Culture and Policy. 9 (3–4): 273–287. doi:10.1080/02691729608578819.
- Widiyanto, Asfa (2017). "Traditional science and scientia sacra: Origin and dimensions of Seyyed Hossein Nasr's concept of science". Intellectual Discourse. 25 (1): 247–272.
- Zebiri, Kate (1998). "Muslim anti‐secularist discourse in the context of Muslim‐Christian relations". Islam and Christian–Muslim Relations. 9 (1): 47–64. doi:10.1080/09596419808721138.
