= Disenchantment =

Cultural rationalization and devaluation of religion

In social science, disenchantment (German: Entzauberung) is the cultural rationalization and devaluation of religion apparent in modern society. The term was borrowed from Friedrich Schiller by Max Weber to describe the character of a modernized, bureaucratic, secularized Western society. In Western society, according to Weber, scientific understanding is more highly valued than belief, and processes are oriented toward rational goals, as opposed to traditional society, in which "the world remains a great enchanted garden".

== Enlightenment ambivalence ==
Weber's ambivalent appraisal of the process of disenchantment as both positive and negative was taken up by the Frankfurt School in their examination of the self-destructive elements in Enlightenment rationalism.

Jürgen Habermas has subsequently striven to find a positive foundation for modernity in the face of disenchantment, even while appreciating Weber's recognition of how far secular society was created from, and is still "haunted by the ghosts of dead religious beliefs."

Wang Huning has written that disenchantment constitutes a dialectical tension in the West which drives forward social and material progress at the expense of "authority, moderation, self-sufficiency, and self-confidence."

Some have seen the disenchantment of the world as a call for existentialist commitment and individual responsibility before a collective normative void.

== Sacralization and desacralization ==
Disenchantment is related to the notion of desacralization, whereby the structures and institutions that previously channeled spiritual belief into rituals that promoted collective identities came under attack and waned in popularity. According to Henri Hubert and Marcel Mauss, the ritual of sacrifice involved two processes: sacralization and desacralization.

The process of sacralization endows a profane offering with sacred properties – consecration – which provides a bridge of communication between the worlds of the sacred and profane. Once the sacrifice has been made, the ritual must be desacralized in order to return the worlds of the sacred and profane to their proper places.

Disenchantment operates on a macro-level, rather than the micro-level of sacralization. It also destroys part of the process whereby the chaotic social elements that require sacralization in the first place continue with mere knowledge as their antidote. Therefore, disenchantment can be related to Émile Durkheim's concept of anomie: an unmooring of the individual from the ties that bind in society.

== Re-enchantment ==
In recent years, Weber's paradigm has been challenged by thinkers who see a process of re-enchantment operating alongside that of disenchantment. Thus, enchantment is used to fundamentally change how even low-paid service work is experienced.

Carl Jung considered symbols to provide a means for the numinous to return from the unconscious to the desacralized world – a means for the recovery of myth, and the sense of wholeness it once provided, to a disenchanted modernity.

Ernest Gellner argued that, although disenchantment was the inevitable product of modernity, many people just could not stand a disenchanted world, and therefore opted for various "re-enchantment creeds", such as psychoanalysis, Marxism, Wittgensteinianism, phenomenology, and ethnomethodology. A noticeable feature of these re-enchantment creeds is that they all tried to make themselves compatible with naturalism: i.e., they did not refer to supernatural forces. Likewise, Charles Taylor identified certain aesthetic impulses—those found in Romanticism, magic realism, and "[watching] movies about the uncanny"—as failed attempts to recover an enchanted sense of self.

== Criticism ==
The American historian of religion Jason Josephson-Storm has challenged mainstream sociological and historical interpretations of both the concept of disenchantment and of reenchantment, labeling the former as a "myth". Josephson-Storm argues that there has not been a decline in belief in magic or mysticism in Western Europe or the United States, even after adjusting for religious belief, education, and class.

== See also ==
- Desacralization of knowledge
- God is dead
- Iron cage
- Marx's theory of alienation
- New Age
- The Protestant Ethic and the Spirit of Capitalism
- Resacralization of knowledge
- Romanticism
- Tripartite classification of authority
- Urbanization
