= Jane Idleman Smith =

American Islamic scholar (1937–2026)

- Born: Jane Idleman Smith; August 23, 1937; Park Ridge, Illinois, U.S.
- Died: June 4, 2026 (aged 88); Avon, Connecticut, U.S.

Academic background
- Education: Hartford Seminary, Harvard University

Academic work
- Institutions: Hartford Seminary
- Notable works: Muslims, Christians, and the Challenge of Interfaith Dialogue; Mission to America: Five Islamic Sectarian Communities in North America

Jane Idleman Smith (August 23, 1937 – June 4, 2026) was an American scholar of Islam who was a professor of comparative religion at Harvard University. She was also Professor Emerita of Islamic studies at Hartford Seminary.

== Life and career ==
Smith was born August 23, 1937, and grew up in Park Ridge, Illinois. She received Bachelor of Divinity degree from Hartford Seminary and her PhD from Harvard Divinity School.

She served as Professor of Islamic Studies and Christian-Muslim Relations and co-director of the Macdonald Center for the Study of Islam and Christian-Muslim Relations at Hartford Seminary and professor of Comparative Religion at Harvard University. Smith also served as co-editor of The Muslim World journal.

Smith died at her home in Avon, Connecticut, June 4, 2026, at the age of 88.

== Works ==
- Islam in America
- Muslim Women in America: The Challenge of Islamic Identity Today
- The Islamic Understanding of Death and Resurrection
- Mission to America: Five Islamic Sectarian Communities in North America
- Muslims, Christians, and the Challenge of Interfaith Dialogue
- Islam and the West Post 9/11
- An Historical and Semantic Study of the Term "islām" as Seen in a Sequence of Qurʼān Commentaries

== See also ==
- Anna M. Gade
- Yvonne Haddad
