= Liu Shu-hsien =

Chinese philosopher

- Born: 1934; Shanghai, China
- Died: June 6, 2016 (aged 81–82); Taipei, Taiwan

Philosophical work
- Era: 20th-century philosophy
- Region: Eastern philosophy
- School: Neo-Confucianism
- Institutions: Tunghai University; Southern Illinois University; Chinese University of Hong Kong; Academia Sinica
- Main interests: Confucian philosophy, ethics, religious thought
- Notable works: Understanding Confucian Philosophy: Classical and Sung-Ming (1998); The Contemporary Significance and Religious Import of Confucianism (1986)

Liu Shu-hsien (1934-6 June 2016) was a Neo-Confucian philosopher and emeritus professor of philosophy at the Chinese University of Hong Kong in Shatin, Hong Kong.

== Biography ==
Liu Shu-hsien was born in Shanghai, China in 1934. He graduated from the National Taiwan University and received his Ph.D. from Southern Illinois University. Before joining the Chinese University of Hong Kong, Liu taught at Tunghai University from 1958 to 1962 and at Southern Illinois University from 1966 to 1981. Liu was invited to join the philosophy Department at the Chinese University of Hong Kong in 1974. He formally joined upon his resignation from the Southern Illinois University in 1981 and later became the Chair Professor, a post he held until his retirement in 1999. He had also worked as a researcher at the Institute of Chinese Literature and Philosophy at Academia Sinica in Taiwan. On 6 June 2016, at the age of 82, professor Liu died in Taipei, Taiwan.

== Works ==
- Understanding Confucian philosophy: classical and Sung-Ming (1998)
- The contemporary significance and religious import of Confucianism (1986)

== See also ==
- Tu Weiming
