= David Burrell =

American philosopher (1933–2023)

David Bakewell Burrell
- Born: March 1, 1933; Akron, Ohio, U.S.
- Died: October 1, 2023 (aged 90); Notre Dame, Indiana, U.S.
- Education: University of Notre Dame, Yale University, Gregorian University
- Occupations: Academic, writer, and priest
- Awards: Honorary doctorate in theology from Lund University (Sweden) 2008, Aquinas medal from American Catholic Philosophical Association (2008), John Courtney Murray Award from Catholic Theological Society of America (2009).

David Bakewell Burrell CSC (March 1, 1933 – October 1, 2023) was an American educator, theologian, writer and translator who was a priest of the Congregation of Holy Cross. He was the Theodore Hesburgh Professor emeritus in Philosophy and Theology at University of Notre Dame, US.

He wrote around thirteen books on Judeo-Christian and Islamic religions. He knew several languages; he translated two books of Al-Ghazali from Arabic into English. He also taught comparative theology, ethics and development at Uganda Martyrs University, Nkozi, Uganda; Tangaza College, Nairobi, Kenya; and Hebrew University, Jerusalem. During 1960s, he was involved in Anti-Vietnam War Movement. He was also a professor at Notre Dame University Bangladesh. Burrell died in Notre Dame, Indiana on October 1, 2023, at the age of 90.

== Bibliography ==
=== Books ===
- Burrell, David (1973). Analogy and Philosophical Language. Yale University Press. ISBN 978-0-300-01567-6.
- —— (1974). Exercises in Religious Understanding. University of Notre Dame Press. ISBN 978-0-268-00548-1.
- —— (1979). Aquinas: God and Action. University of Notre Dame Press. ISBN 978-0-268-00588-7.
- —— (1986). Knowing the Unknowable God: Ibn-Sina, Maimonides, Aquinas. University of Notre Dame Press. ISBN 978-0-268-01226-7.
- —— (1993). Freedom and Creation in Three Traditions. University of Notre Dame Press. ISBN 978-0-268-00987-8.
- ——; Elena Malits (1997). Original Peace: Restoring God's Creations. Paulist. ISBN 978-0-8091-3733-6.
- —— (2000). Friendship and Ways to Truth. University of Notre Dame Press. ISBN 978-0-268-02860-2.
- —— (2004). Faith and Freedom: An Interfaith Perspective. Blackwell. ISBN 978-1-4051-2170-5.
- —— (2008). Deconstructing Theodicy: A Philosophical Commentary on Job. Grand Rapids, MI: Brazos. ISBN 978-1-58743-222-4.
- —— (2009). When Faith and Reason Meet: The Legacy of John Zahm CSC. Notre Dame, IN: Corby Publishing. ISBN 978-0-9776458-9-3.
- —— (2010). Learning to Trust in Freedom: Signs from Jewish, Christian and Muslim Traditions. University of Scranton Press. ISBN 978-1-58966-195-0.
- —— (2011). Towards a Jewish-Christian-Muslim Theology. Wiley-Blackwell. ISBN 978-0-470-65755-3.

=== Translations ===
- Al-Ghazali on the Ninety-Nine Beautiful Names of God (translation from Arabic with Nazih Daher) (Cambridge: Islamic Texts Society, 1992; Louisville, KY: Fons Vitae, 1998)
- Al-Ghazali on Faith in Divine Unity and Trust in Divine Providence (translation of Book 35 of Ihya' Ulum al-Din) (Louisville, KY: Fons Vitae, 2000)
- Roger Arnaldez's Three Messengers for one God (Notre Dame, IN: University of Notre Dame Press, 1998) – with Mary Louise Gude, C.S.C. and Gerald Schlabach
- Avital Wohlman's Al-Ghazali, Averroes and the Interpretation of the Qur'an: Common Sense and Philosophy in Islam (London: Routledge, 2009) – translated from Contrepoint entre le sens commun et la philosophy en Islam: Ghazali et Averroès (Paris: Editions du Cerf, 2008)
