= Islamic vegetarianism =

Abstaining from meat in Islam

Islamic vegetarianism and veganism is the practice of abstention from meat (and other animal products in case of vegans) among Muslims. The vast majority of Muslims eat meat; many Islamic jurists consider vegetarianism permissible but not superior to meat-eating. The religious arguments for the vegetarian diet include the requirement for compassion imposed on Muslims by Quran and sunnah and the concept of stewardship (khalifa). Modern vegetarian Muslims often encounter prejudice for their diet. A particular case is the tradition of killing an animal during the celebration of the Eid al-Adha, which many Muslims see as compulsory or at least an emphasized sunnah.

== Background ==
Vegetarianism is very rare among Muslims, but is widespread among the adherents of other religions such as Jainism, Hinduism and Buddhism. Many Muslims eat meat as often as they can.

Although the Quran and the hadith strongly encourage Muslims to treat animals humanely and the Islamic prophet Muhammad spoke against recreational hunting, Quran explicitly permits the consumption of (halal) meat in the first ayah of the al-Ma'idah sura. The rules of halal ritual slaughter mention that the animal must not suffer more than needed. Historically, the first Muslims, nomadic Arabs, had to eat meat to sustain themselves.

Vegetarians were historically often seen as heretics; examples include al-Ma'arri. The view that vegetarianism is un-Islamic stems from the historic animosity between Muslims and practitioners of Buddhism and Hinduism. Modern Muslim vegetarians and vegans often have to face prejudice and hostility.

== Proponents ==
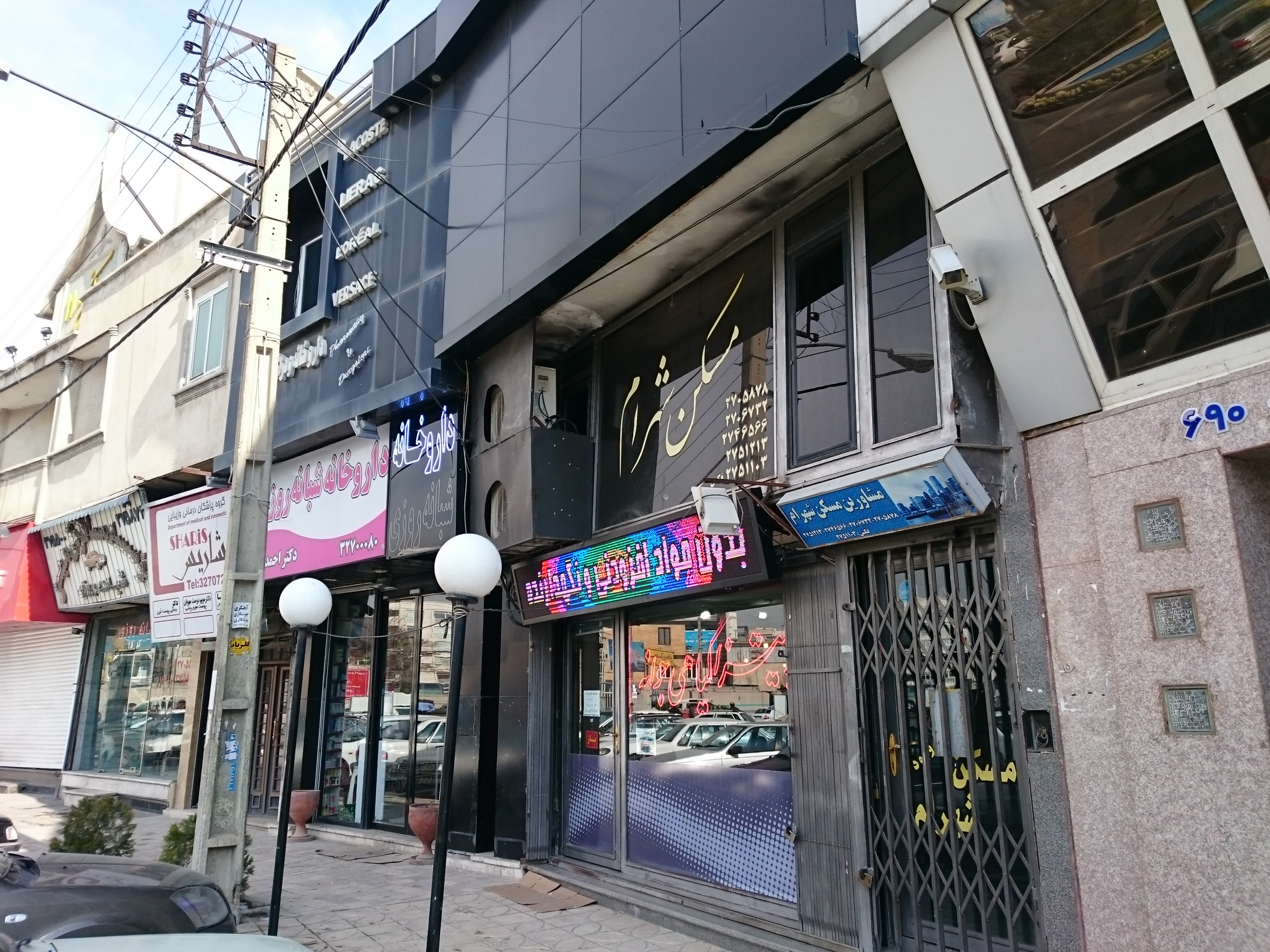
Vegetarian restaurant in Karaj, Iran

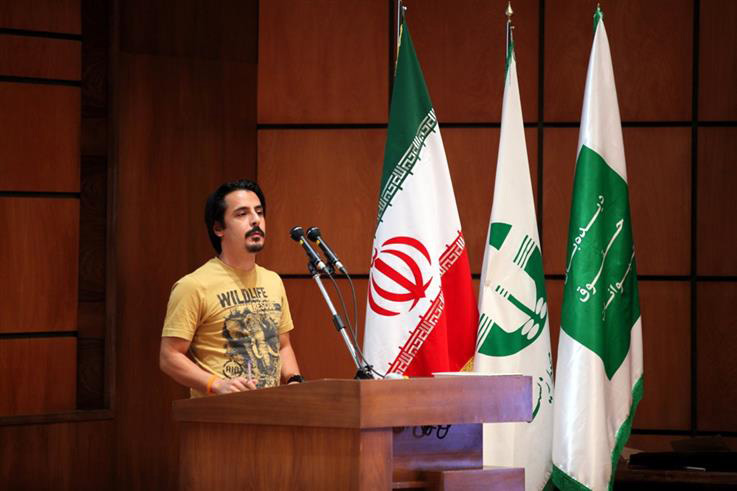
Vegetarian activist Sepehr Salimi

Several Sufis, including Suhrawardi Hamiduddin Nagori from Nagaur, Bawa Muhaiyaddeen and some others in North Africa were practising a strict vegan diet. The 9th–10th century secret society Brethren of Purity produced an epistle titled The Case of the Animals versus Man, in which they relayed a story about Rabi'a al-Basri telling Hasan al-Basri that animals come to her but run from him because of his meat diet. Indian Islamic scholar Bashir Ahmad Masri, a pioneer of animal welfare, has expressed his dissatisfaction with the amount of cruelty inflicted upon animals stemming from anthropocentrism and advocated for a vegetarian Muslim diet. Some thinkers connect the topic of meat abstention with the khilafa, duty of stewardship imposed upon humans by God.

Several fatwas issued by jurists such as Ebrahim Desai, Hamza Yusuf, Mohammad Hussein Fadlallah, Muzammil H. Siddiqi, Muhammad al-Munajjid and Ali Khamenei state that abstaining from meat is permissible for Muslims as long as they do not deem it an obligation or a way of being a better Muslim than others. Inayat Khan concluded that not eating meat is desirable because meat "hinders spiritual progress" while the act of killing is unkind. Modern proponents of Islamic veganism cite the excessive suffering of the factory-farmed animals, the environmental harms of the meat and dairy industries and the zoonotic infections as the reasons to switch to a vegan diet. Vegetarian believers express their concerns about whether any meat from inhumanely raised animal can be halal, even if it has been certified as such. Muslim doctors advocating for vegetarianism from the health standpoint also use the example of Muhammad as a person leading a "mostly vegetarian" lifestyle. Modern Muslim academics who advocate for vegetarianism include Duke McLeod and Mohamed Ghilan.

== Criticism ==
Iraqi Islamic scholar Mawil Izzi Dien ruled that Islamic vegetarianism is completely unacceptable. Izz al-Din ibn 'Abd al-Salam: "The unbeliever who prohibits the slaughtering of an animal [for no reason but] to achieve the interest of the animal is incorrect because in so doing he gives preference to a lower, khasis, animal over a higher, nafis, animal" in "Qawa'id al-ahkam fi masalih al-anam" Ibn Hazm believed that only creatures who can show an understanding of Islamic laws are subject to it. Pakistani Islamic scholar Abul A'la Mawdudi said that Islam allows humans killing other animals for food and permits killing animals perceived as harmful because humans are the khalifa (deputies) of God. Some scholars praise reduced meat consumption, others stress the importance of humane treatment of animals, but do not support vegetarianism.

== Eid al-Adha sacrifice ==
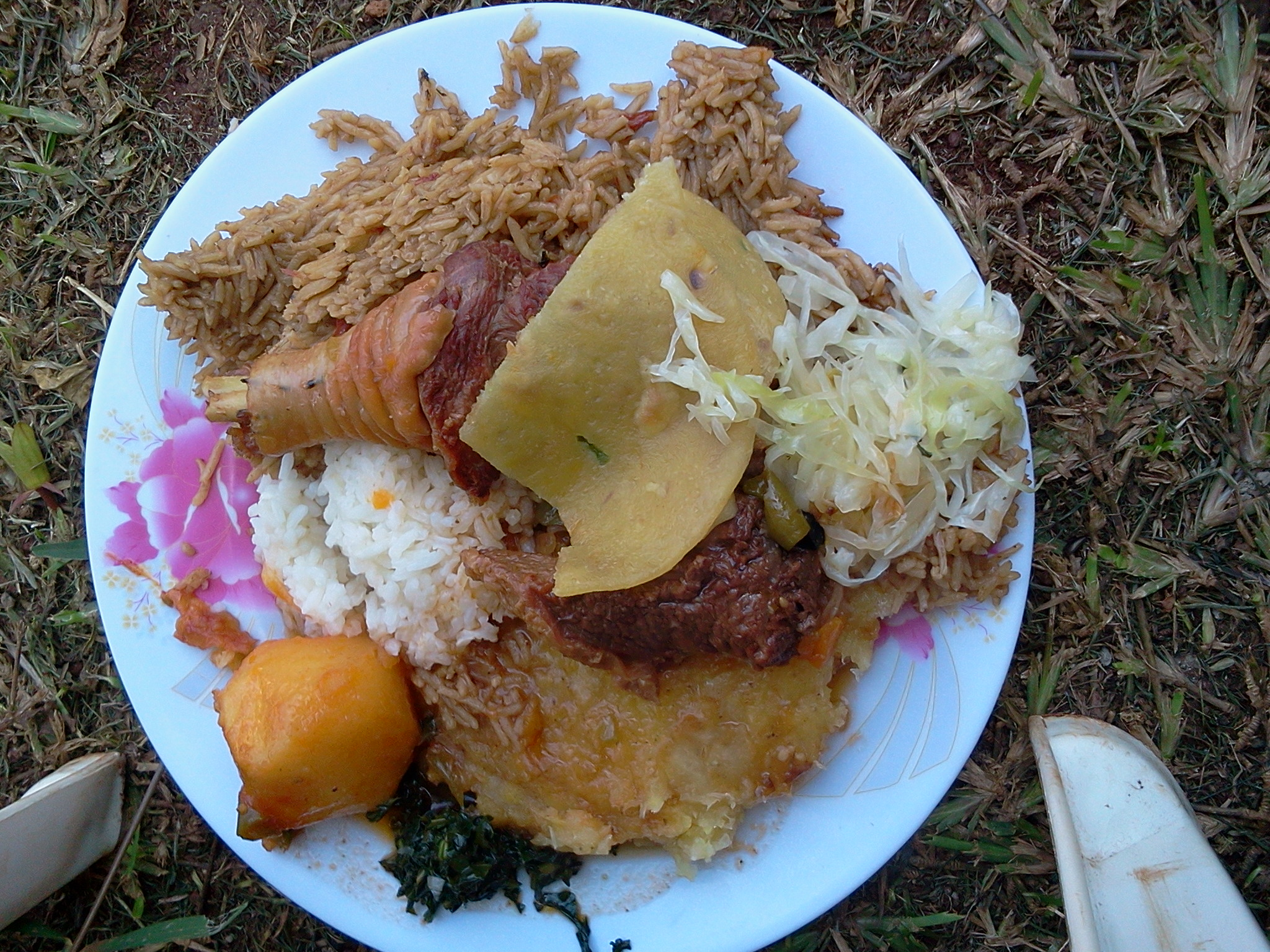
Meat in the Eid Al-adha food in Uganda

The custom of animal slaughter during the Eid al-Adha is widespread among Muslims, but most jurists rule that killing animals on that day is desired but not compulsory. Bashir Ahmad Masri and several other faqih suggested replacing the animal sacrifice with charitable donations or fasting. Several others voiced their opposition to the current practice of "excessive" killing of animals whose meat often stays uneaten and goes to waste. Activist Shahid Ali Muttaqi wrote that the slaughter during the celebration of Eid al-Adha is performed for people's nafs.

Muslims who are practising veganism either donate money to have the slaughter done in their name without participating in it, or donate to charitable purposes.
