= Islamic environmentalism =

Strand of environmental philosophy

Islamic environmentalism is a strand of environmental as well as Islamic philosophy that employs environmental principles derived from Islamic scriptures and traditions to the environment and the modern-day environmental crisis. Modern Islamic environmentalists derive their contemporary ecotheology from Islam's long tradition of stewardship theology - as Islam teaches that God holds absolute sovereignty over creation, Muslim envornomentalists emphasize humanity's role as stewards, making it their duty to protect and preserve God's creation. Islamic environmentalism encompasses Islamic ecological philosophy, Sharia-based environmental law, and Islamic environmental activism.

== History ==
Islamic environmentalism began with the Iranian philosopher Seyyed Hossein Nasr and has evolved since the 1960s. A series of lectures delivered at the University of Chicago in 1966 by Nasr serves as an original point of reference. He was, in fact, among the early thinkers "to draw attention to the spiritual dimensions of the environmental crisis". Nasr draws on Sufism and the concept of the unity of being to emphasize the connections between environmental degradation and the modern world's spiritual and moral crises. The field of Islamic environmentalism developed further in the 1980s with the contributions made by contemporary thinkers such as Mawil Izzi Dien and Fazlun Khalid.

== People ==
The Iranian-born philosopher Seyyed Hossein Nasr is considered the founding father of Islamic environmentalism. Other notable figures in this field include: Fazlun Khalid, Mawil Izzi Dien, Othman Llewellyn, Ibrahim Ozdemir, Syed Nomanul Haq and Mustafa Abu Sway.

== Ideas ==
=== No human sovereignty ===
The concept of human sovereignty over nature and natural resources, referred to as "dominion" in religious contexts, lies at the center of religious and secular environmental debates. The Quran, unlike the Hebrew Bible and secular philosophy, does not recognize human sovereignty over nature, which has a significant impact on Islamic environmental debate. The Quran declares in seventeen different places that mulk or dominion exclusively belongs to God (Allah). Mulk is derived from the root M L K and means "ownership" or "possession." It appears forty-eight times in the Quran, and it refers to both the earthly kingdom or kingship, such as the kingdom of Solomon in 2:102, and to "the heavens and the earth", implying the whole of creation. It is always God who possesses mulk in every passage when "the heavens and the earth" as a whole is mentioned, rather than a specific earthly kingdom.

=== Mankind as Khalifah ===
The Quran defined mankind as a Khālifah, or a representative or successor on the earth, rather than having dominion over or possession of it. The idea of khalifah (stewardship) is arguably the most important concept in Islamic environmentalism. Proponents of eco-Islamic beliefs emphasize man's duty as God's vicegerent or steward (khalifah) on the earth. As such, he is responsible for acting in line with God's will and caring for the earth in the way He demands. It is vital to recognize that stewardship does not imply supremacy over other living beings. Humans must learn to live in harmony with nature rather than working against it in order to practice stewardship. Some Muslim scholars even consider this stewardship a divine test. Natural world, as God's creation, is a sign through which humanity can perceive God.

=== Oneness of God ===
The idea of oneness of God (tawhid) is another important principle that is frequently pursued in Islamic ecology. Within the context of Islamic environmentalism, the notion of tawhid has different levels of meaning. To begin with, it denotes monotheistic oneness of God, in contrast to the polytheistic doctrines and beliefs, and unity of God, in contrast to the Christian idea of the Trinity. It is an expression of God's transcendent unity with all of His creation. This unity with creation expresses the reality that everything in the world is a part of God's creation and is interconnected, making the entire world meaningful, valuable, and deserving of preservation.

=== Notion of mizan ===
The notion of mizan, which means "balance", is fundamental to an Islamic environmental perspective. This idea is employed to describe the complex eco-systems and physical laws of the cosmos. The most common verse used by Muslim scholars when discussing mizan is 15:19, which says, "As for the earth, We have spread it out, set firm mountains on it, and made everything grow there in due balance". In other words humans must "make the best use of reason and to maintain the balance and proportion God has built into his creation". In Arabic, the word mizan connotes both physical balance, and justice.

=== Other concepts ===
To address contemporary issues such as pollution, Muslim authors employ the Islamic juristic practice of Qiyas (reasoning by analogy). They understand ahadith regulating cleanliness, prohibitions against odour, and hygiene as prohibitions against contamination of land, water, and air.

Islamic environmental literature cites sayings of the Prophet emphasising the importance of conserving water during ablution and not being wasteful as instances of Islam's attitude on wasteful resource consumption.

Islamic scholars and a host of ecological groups have put together a Muslim faith-based covenant called Al Mizan to inform people on the ecological references in the Quran and the Islamic take on protecting the planet. Topics include genetic engineering, the ecology during times of war and hunting animals like birds for sport. It was released in 2024.

== See also ==
- Biocentrism (ethics)
- Deep ecology
- Environmental ethics
- Environmentalism
- Islamic bioethics
- Islamic Foundation for Ecology and Environmental Science
- Land ethic
- Misali Island (the first documented collaboration between a secular conservation organization and religious leaders to promote ecological preservation)
- Religion and environmentalism
- Resacralization of nature

== Sources ==
- Foltz, Richard (2006). "Seyyed Hossein Nasr". In Taylor, Bron (ed.). The Encyclopedia of Religion and Nature. Continuum. ISBN 9780199754670.
- Foltz, Richard (2013). "Ecology in Islam". In Runehov, Anne L. C.; Oviedo, Lluis (eds.). Encyclopedia of Sciences and Religions. Springer. ISBN 978-1402082641.
- Hancock, R. (2017). Islamic Environmentalism: Activism in the United States and Great Britain. Routledge Advances in Sociology. Taylor & Francis. ISBN 978-1-134-86550-5.
- Hancock, Rosemary (2019), "Ecology in Islam", Oxford Research Encyclopedia of Religion, Oxford University Press, doi:10.1093/acrefore/9780199340378.013.510, ISBN 978-0-19-934037-8
- Johnston, David L. (2012). "Intra-Muslim Debates on Ecology: Is Shari'a Still Relevant?". Worldviews. 16 (3): 218–238. doi:10.1163/15685357-01603003. JSTOR 43809777.
- Koehrsen, Jens (2021). "Muslims and climate change: How Islam, Muslim organizations, and religious leaders influence climate change perceptions and mitigation activities". WIREs Climate Change. 12 (3). Wiley. doi:10.1002/wcc.702. hdl:10852/90034. ISSN 1757-7780. S2CID 233963934.
- Ouis, Soumaya Pernilla (1998). "Islamic Ecotheology based on the Qur'an". Islamic Studies. 37 (2). Islamic Research Institute, International Islamic University, Islamabad: 151–181. ISSN 0578-8072. JSTOR 20836989.
- Quadir, Tarik M. (2013). Traditional Islamic Environmentalism: The Vision of Seyyed Hossein Nasr. Lanham, MD: University Press of America. ISBN 978-0-7618-6143-0.
