= Ecotheology =

Theological reflection on the environment

Ecotheology (cf. Environmental theology) is a form of constructive theology that focuses on the interrelationships of religion and nature, particularly in the light of environmental concerns. Ecotheology generally starts from the premise that a relationship exists between human religious/spiritual worldviews and the degradation or restoration and preservation of nature. It explores the interaction between ecological values, such as sustainability, and the human domination of nature. The movement has produced numerous religious-environmental projects around the world.

The burgeoning awareness of environmental crisis has led to widespread religious reflection on the human relationship with the earth. Such reflection has strong precedents in most religious traditions in the realms of ethics and cosmology, and can be seen as a subset or corollary to the theology of nature.

Ecotheology explores not only the relationship between religion and nature in terms of degradation of nature, but also in terms of ecosystem management in general. Specifically, ecotheology seeks not only to identify prominent issues within the relationship between nature and religion, but also to outline potential solutions. Many supporters and contributors of ecotheology argue that science and education are simply not enough to inspire the change necessary in the current environmental crisis.

There is not a clear distinction between environmental theology and ecotheology, though the term environmental theology might indicate a theology in which environmental ethics is established prior to one's understanding of the meaning of God.

== Background ==
Seyyed Hossein Nasr, a pioneering figure in the field of ecotheology, was among the early thinkers "to draw attention to the spiritual dimensions of the environmental crisis." He first presented his insight in a 1965 essay, expanding it in a series of lectures given at the University of Chicago the following year, in May 1966, several months before Lynn White, Jr. gave his famous lecture before the American Academy of Arts and Sciences on December 26, 1966 (published in Science in 1967 as "The Historical Roots of Our Ecologic Crisis"). Nasr's lectures were later published as Man and Nature: The Spiritual Crisis of Modern Man in 1968. These lectures argue, in a detailed manner, "for the revival of a sacred view of the universe in order to combat the contemporary environmental crisis". Anna M. Gade states that the "short and often credited" article by Lynn White contained "similar arguments" made by Nasr in his "influential" Rockefeller Series Lectures at the University of Chicago Divinity School, about a year ago. Richard Foltz is also of the view that Nasr's Lectures that "preceded" White's 1967 article presented "similar argument". Foltz argues that "Nasr has made the connection between the West's spiritual and environmental crises since the 1950s" and "actually anticipated White's critique in his own lectures given at the University of Chicago earlier in the same year as White's address". Nasr is credited for making "significant methodological and theoretical contributions to the development of eco-theology".

The relationship of theology to the modern ecological crisis, however, became an intense issue of debate in Western academia in 1967, following the publication of the article, "The Historical Roots of Our Ecologic Crisis", by Lynn White Jr., Professor of History at the University of California at Los Angeles. In this work, White puts forward a theory that the Christian model of human dominion over nature has led to environmental devastation, providing a voice for "The Ecological Complaint".

In 1973, theologian Jack Rogers published an article in which he surveyed the published studies of approximately twelve theologians which had appeared since White's article. They reflect the search for "an appropriate theological model" which adequately assesses the biblical data regarding the relationship between God, humans, and nature.

== Precedents in religious thought ==
Some scholars argue that Christians actually helped bring about the current global environmental crisis by instructing followers that God, and by extension mankind, transcends nature. Much of the development of ecotheology as a theological discourse was in response to this argument, which has been called "The Ecological Complaint". Defendants of this perspective essentially claim that Christianity promotes the idea of human dominion over nature, treating nature itself as a tool to be used and even exploited for survival and prosperity.

However, Christianity has often been viewed as the source of positive values towards the environment, and there are many voices within the Christian tradition whose vision embraces the well-being of the earth and all creatures. While Francis of Assisi is one of the more obvious influences on Christian ecotheology, there are many theologians and teachers, such as Isaac of Nineveh and Seraphim of Sarov, whose work has profound implications for Christian thinkers. Many of these are less well known in the West because their primary influence has been on the Orthodox Church rather than the Roman Catholic Church.

The significance of indigenous traditions for the development of ecotheology also cannot be overstated. Systems of Traditional Ecological Knowledge, in combination with modern scientific methods of ecosystem management, are steadily gaining interest as environmental activists realize the importance of locally invested groups. Indigenous practices are often based on long histories of observations of nature, as well as a deep connection to and understanding of surrounding environments. In Indonesia, Marapu, the practice of the Sumba people, prohibits the hunting of hornbill wings because of their resemblance to God. Studies have found that hornbills are vital in their ecosystem for the dispersion and propagation of seeds. Reverence for certain species in various indigenous cultures ensures their long term conservation. In the Kuningan Regency in the West Java Province of Indonesia, Dewa fish (Neolissochillus soro) are seen as guardians of the sacred waters they inhabit and are symbols of prosperity and harmony. As a result, capturing or harming them is prohibited, which allows for the conservation of their populations.

== Further exploration ==
Christian ecotheology draws on the writings of such authors as Jesuit priest and paleontologist Pierre Teilhard de Chardin, philosopher Alfred North Whitehead, and Passionist priest and historian Thomas Berry. It is well represented in Protestantism by John B. Cobb, Jr., Jürgen Moltmann, and Michael Dowd; in ecofeminism by feminist theologians Rosemary Radford Ruether, Catherine Keller, and Sallie McFague; in ecowomanism by Melanie Harris and Karen Baker-Fletcher; in liberation theology by Leonardo Boff and Tink Tinker; in Roman Catholicism by John F. Haught and Pope Francis; and in Orthodoxy by Elizabeth Theokritoff and George Nalunnakkal (currently Bishop Geevarghese Mor Coorilose of the Jacobite Syrian Christian Church). Besides works on theology per se, interpreters of the ecological significance of scripture, such as Ellen Davis, also play an important role. Creation Spirituality is another important expression of ecotheology that has been developed and popularized by Matthew Fox, a former Catholic Dominican friar turned Episcopal priest. Mark I. Wallace is a self-described Christian animist; his research argues that when God appears in the Bible as a dove, a snake, or the burning bush, that this is a literal transformation rather than a metaphorical one.

Abraham Joshua Heschel and Martin Buber, both Jewish philosophers, have also left their mark on Christian ecotheology, and provide significant inspiration for Jewish ecotheology. The most recent and most complete expressions of Jewish ecotheology to date can be found in Rabbi Arthur Ocean Waskow's work on ecotheology in the Hebrew scriptures and Rabbi David Mevorach Seidenberg's work on Kabbalah and ecology.

Muslim ecotheology draws on environmental interpretations of the Qur'an. The verse "Explain to me if your source of water dries up; then who will give you flowing water" (Al-mulk 67:30) can be interpreted as emphasizing the importance of balancing and managing water resources. Water is seen as a gift from God that needs to be protected, not only because water is needed to preserve life but also because water is necessary for a number of religious activities. Vocabulary from the Qur'an also emphasizes the importance of human protection of the Earth. The term "caliph" or "khalifah," meaning "steward" is used to refer to humans. Some Islamic scholars interpret this to mean that humans are responsible for the preservation and protection of the environment. Some pesantren are also shifting their educational curriculums to educate students about the importance of environmental stewardship and preservation from a young age to create a more environmentally conscious generation.

Hindu ecotheology includes writers such as Vandana Shiva. Seyyed Hossein Nasr, a Perennialist scholar and Persian Sufi philosopher, was one of the earlier Muslim voices calling for a reevaluation of the Western relationship to nature.

Elisabet Sahtouris is an evolutionary biologist and futurist who promotes a vision she believes will result in the sustainable health and well-being of humanity within the larger living systems of Earth and the cosmos. She is a lecturer in Gaia Theory and a coworker with James Lovelock and Lynn Margulis. Increasingly there are points of reference between Gaianism, environmentalism and the world's major religions.

Annie Dillard, Pulitzer Prize-winning American author, also combined observations on nature and philosophical explorations in several ecotheological writings, including Pilgrim at Tinker Creek.

Terry Tempest Williams is a Mormon writer and conservationist who explores ecotheology in her writing.

The majority of the content of Indians of the Americas, by former Bureau of Indian Affairs head John Collier, concerns the link between ecological sustainability and religion among Native North and South Americans.

Professor and author Stephen Bede Scharper has proposed and expanded on the concept of Anthropoharmonism, drawing on liberation theology, and cosmocentric perspectives to describe a reorientation of human’s relationship with the environment.

== See also ==
- Animism
- Ecospirituality
- Faith in Place
- Hima (environmental protection)
- Kaitiaki
- Laudato si'
  - Laudate Deum
- Religion and environmentalism
  - Christianity and environmentalism
  - Judaism and environmentalism
- Religious naturalism
- Spiritual ecology
- Stewardship
  - Earth stewardship
- Yale Forum on Religion and Ecology
