= Michael Northcott =

The Reverend Michael Northcott
- Born: Michael Stafford Northcott; 13 May 1955 (age 71); London, England
- Spouse: Jill Benz (m. 1977)

Ecclesiastical career
- Religion: Christianity (Anglican)
- Church: Church of England; Scottish Episcopal Church
- Ordained: 1981 (deacon); 1982 (priest)

Academic background
- Education: St Chad's College, Durham; Sunderland Polytechnic
- Thesis: An Empirical Study of the Social and Theological Factors in the Development of New Patterns of Ministry in the Church of England in the Diocese of Durham (1982)
- Doctoral advisor: David Jenkins

Academic work
- Discipline: Theology
- Sub-discipline: Environmental theology; moral theology; political theology
- Institutions: Malaysia Theological Seminary; South East Asia Graduate School of Theology; University of Edinburgh
- Website: 2019 Personal Website archive

Michael Stafford Northcott (born 1955) is Professor Emeritus of Ethics at the University of Edinburgh, Scotland. He is best known for his contributions to environmental theology and ethics.

== Life ==
Born in London on 13 May 1955 to James and Betty Northcott, Michael Northcott was raised in Kent, England, and attended schools in Beckenham and Cranbrook. He was married in 1977 to Jill Benz, with whom he has two daughters and a son.

He holds a Bachelor of Arts degree in theology and a Master of Arts degree in systematic theology from the University of Durham where he attended St Chad's College. He was ordained to the diaconate of the Church of England, after attending Cranmer Hall, Durham, in 1981, and to the priesthood in 1982. He received a Doctor of Philosophy degree from the Council for National Academic Awards (CNAA) and Sunderland Polytechnic (now Sunderland University) in 1982 for a thesis on new patterns of ministry in the Northeast of England; his advisor was David E. Jenkins. He served as an Anglican curate in St Clements, Chorlton-cum-Hardy, from 1981 to 1984.

He began his academic career as a research assistant in Sunderland Polytechnic from 1977 to 1980. He was appointed lecturer in practical theology at the Seminari Theologi Malaysia in Kuala Lumpur in 1984 and as Associate Professor in the South East Asia Graduate School of Theology in 1986. He joined the University of Edinburgh in 1989 as lecturer in Christian ethics and practical theology; he became a full professor there in 2007. He has supervised thirty doctoral students at Edinburgh. He is currently working at the University of Gadjah Mada (Universitas Gadjah Mada) in Yogyakarta, Indonesia, as an Adjunct Professor as part of the Indonesian Consortium for Religious Studies.

He has been visiting professor at Dartmouth College (1997 and 2011), Claremont School of Theology (2002), the Nicholas School of Earth Sciences, Duke University (2005), Flinders University Adelaide (2008), the University of Malaya (2008) and ETF Leuven (2019).

He writes regularly in the Church Times and is a priest in the Scottish Episcopal Church where he has served as Associate Priest at Old Saint Paul's, Edinburgh, and St James, Leith.

== Current research projects ==
Northcott's research deals with the relationship between ethics, ecology and religion. He is currently working on four research projects: place, ecology and the sacred, climate change and Christian ethics, religion and ecology in southeast Asia, and the morality of making: work, technology and Christian ethics. He leads a large AHRC grant on faith-based ecological activism in the UK entitled Caring for the Future Through Ancestral Time. He is a co-investigator on the Human-Business at Edinburgh Initiative investigating the ethical implications of current modes of representing economic value.

== Bibliography ==
=== Books written ===
- Place, Ecology and the Sacred: The Moral Geography of Sustainable Communities (Continuum Publishing Corporation, 2015)
- A Political Theology of Climate Change (SPCK Publishing, 2014)
- Cuttlefish Clones and Climate Change and Cluster Bombs: Preaching, Politics & Ecology (Darton Longhand and Todd, 2010)
- A Moral Climate: The Ethics of Global Warming (Darton, Longman and Todd, 2007)
  - Review, Christian Century, 125 no 9 My 6 2008, pp. 43–45.
  - Review, Journal for the Study of Religion, Nature and Culture, 4 no 4 Dec 2010, pp. 499–501.
  - Review, Anglican Theological Review, 91 no 4 Fall 2009, pp. 668–670.
  - Review, Theological Studies, 70 no 2 Je 2009, pp. 491–493.
  - Review, Interpretation, 63 no 1 Ja 2009, pp. 102–104.
  - Review, Modern Believing, 49 no 4 O 2008, pp. 75–77.
  - Review, Theology, 112 no 865 Ja-F 2009, pp. 68–70.
  - Review, Sewanee Theological Review, 52 no 3 Pentecost 2009, pp. 320–322.
  - Review, Svensk teologisk kvartalskrift, 85 no 2 2009, pp. 95–96.
  - Review, Epworth Review, 35 no 2 Ap 2008, pp. 80–81.
- An Angel Directs the Storm: Apocalyptic Religion and American Empire (I. B. Tauris, 2004), Revised paperback edition, SCM Press, 2007. Arabic translation 2008.
  - Review, First Things, no 156 O 2005, pp. 48–52.
  - Review, Journal of Church and State, 47 no 3 Sum 2005, pp. 646–647.
  - Review, Modern Believing, 46 no 2 Ap 2005, pp. 64–65.
  - Review, Epworth Review, 35 no 3 Jl 2008, pp. 86–87.
  - Review, St Mark's Review, no 204 Mr 2008, pp. 64–67.
  - Review, Theology, 109 no 847 Ja-F 2006, pp. 72–73.
  - Review, Expository Times, 117 no 3 D 2005, pp. 105–106.
- Life After Debt: Christianity and Global Justice (SPCK, 1999)
- The Environment and Christian Ethics (Cambridge University Press, 1996)
  - Review, Pro Ecclesia, 8 no 3 Sum 1999, pp. 375–377.
  - Review, Theology Today, 54 no 4 1998, pp. 549–550.
  - Review, Christian Century, 114 no 33 Nov 19-26 1997, p. 1097.
  - Review, International Review of Mission, 86 no 340-341 1997, pp. 153–154.
  - Review, New Blackfriars, 79 no 924 F 1998, pp. 105–107.
  - Review, Commonweal, 125 no 1 Ja 16 1998, p. 23.
  - Review, European Journal of Theology, 7 no 2 1998, pp. 141–143.
  - Review, Ecotheology, no 3 Jl 1997, pp. 127–128.
  - Review, Epworth Review, 24 no 3 Jl 1997, pp. 153–156.
  - Review, Expository Times, 108 no 8 My 1997, p. 251.
- The Church and Secularisation: Urban Industrial Mission in North East England (Peter Lang, 1989)

=== Books edited ===
- Systematic Theology and Climate Change: Ecumenical Perspectives (Routledge, 2014)
- Diversity and Dominion: Dialogues in Ecology, Ethics, and 'Theology edited with Kyle Vanhoutan (Cascade Books, 2010)
- Theology After Darwin, Paternoster Press, 2009, edited with R. J. Berry (Paternoster Press 2009)
- Urban Theology: A Reader (Cassell, 1998)

=== Articles ===
- 'A Survey of the Rise of Charismatic Christianity in Malaysia', Asia Journal of Theology, 4/1 (1990), pp. 266–78
- 'Christian-Muslim Relations in West Malaysia', The Muslim World 81/1 (January 1991), pp. 48 – 7
- 'Preston and Hauerwas on Centesimus Annus: Reflections On the Incommensurability of the Liberal and Post-Liberal Mind', Theology 96, no. 769 (1993), pp. 27 – 35
- 'From Environmental U-topianism to Parochial Ecology: Communities of Place and the Politics of Sustainability, Ecotheology, 7, (2000)
- '"An Angel Directs the Storm": The Religious Politics of American Neoconservatism' Political Theology (April 2004), pp. 137 – 158.
- 'The Parable of the Talents and the Economy of the Gift', Theology, (June 2004), pp. 241–249
- 'The Market, the Multitude and Metaphysics: Ronald Prestons Middle Way and the Theological Critique of Economic Reason', Studies in Christian Ethics (September, 2004)
- 'Wilderness, Religion, and Ecological Restoration in the Scottish Highlands', Ecotheology (January, 2005)
- 'Concept Art, Clones and Co-Creators: The Theology of Making' Modern Theology (April, 2005)

=== Book chapters ===
- 'Two Hundred Years of Anglican Mission in West Malaysia', in Lee Kam Hing, W. John Roxborogh and Robert Hunt, (eds.), Christianity in Malaysia. Kuala Lumpur: Pelanduk, 1992
- 'Identity and Decline in the Kirk', in Seeing Scotland: Seeing Christ? Edinburgh: Centre for Theology and Public Issues, 1993
- 'A Place of Our Own', and 'Children', in Peter Sedgwick (ed.), God in the City. London: Mowbray, 1995
- 'Sociological Approaches to the Study of Religion', in Peter Connolly (ed.) Approaches to the Study of Religion. London: Cassell, 1998
- 'Christian Futures, Postmodernity and the State of Britain', in Ursula King (ed.), Faith and Praxis in a Postmodern World. London: Cassell, 1998
- 'Natural Law and Environmental Ethics', in Nigel Biggar (ed.), The Revival of Natural Law: The Finnes and Grisez School. Aldershot: Ashgate, 2000
- 'Sabbaths Shamans and Superquarrying on a Scottish Island: Religio-Cultural Resistance to Development in a Contested Landscape' 17-34 in Fred P. Gale and R. Michael MGonigle (eds.), Nature, Production, Power: Towards an Ecological Political Economy (Cheltenham: Edward Elgar, 2000)
- 'God and Human Cloning', in Russell Stannard (ed.), God for the 21st Century (Philadelphia: Templeton Foundation, 2000)
- 'Pastoral Theology and Social Science' in James Woodward and Stephen Pattison (eds.), A Reader in Practical Theology (Oxford: Blackwell, 2000)
- 'Ecology and Christian Ethics' in Robin Gill (ed.) Cambridge Companion to Christian Ethics (Cambridge: Cambridge University Press, 2000)
- 'The Declaration and the Spirit of Environmentalism' in R. J. Berry (ed.), The Care of Creation (Leicester: Intervarsity Press, 2000)
- '"Behold I have set the land before you" (Deut 1.8): Christian Ethics, GM Foods, and the Culture of Modern Farming', pp. 85 – 106 in Celia Deane-Drummond, Bronislaw Szerszynski with Robin Grove-White (eds.) Reordering Nature: Theology, Society and the New Genetics (London: T and T Clark, 2003)
- 'Being Silent: Time in the Spirit' in The Blackwell Companion to Christian Ethics edited by Stanley Hauerwas and Sam Wells (Blackwell, 2003)
- 'The Word in Time and Space' in Peter J. Francis (ed.) Faithfulness in the City (Hawarden: St Deiniols Library, 2003)
- 'Salmon and Sacraments: Farmed Salmon and Christian Practice' in W. Storrar and A. Morton (eds.) Public Theology Today (London: T. and T. Clark, 2004)
- Donald and Ann Bruce (eds.), Engineering Genesis: The Ethics of Genetic Engineering. London: Earthscan, 1999

=== Other publications ===
- 'The Case Study Method in Theological Education', Contact, 103/3 (1990), pp. 26–32
- 'Research Methods in Practical Theology', Contact 106 (1991), pp. 24 – 33
- 'New Age Rites: The Recovery of Ritual', The Way 33/3 (1993), pp. 189 – 198
- 'New World Order or New World Enemies? Christianity and the Other in the Post-Cold War World', New Blackfriars 74/872 (1993), pp. 319 – 327
- 'Do Dolphins Carry the Cross? Biological Moral Realism and Theological Ethics', New Blackfriars, (December 2003)
