= Environmental theology =

Theology of the environment

Environmental theology pertains to "the God-environment relationship and divine expectations of human behavior in relation to the environment".

== History ==
The history of environmental theology is often regarded as a new age idea developed in the last one hundred years, however, evidence shows that its roots can be traced back to Saint Francis of Assisi. His Sermon to the Birds is referred to often when discussing early environmental theology. It is also discussed for its radical ideas for the time period.

"The Historical Roots of our Ecological Crisis" is the most prominent citation in a literature review on environmental theology. Written by Lynn White Jr. in 1967, it remains one of the core pieces of literature to all environmental theologians. White proposed the idea that the current ecological crisis can trace its roots back to the Bible and human interpretation of God's words. He contends that Western Christianity overemphasizes an anthropocentric view of the environment, which has led to the destruction of the environment over millennia. He instead proposes that Christianity move toward a more nurturing approach to nature. At the end of his essay, White nominated Saint Francis of Assisi to be the patron saint of ecologists.

Writings in environmental theology normally cover two veins of thought: one sector being a belief system and the other sector being a behavior system. It is commonly found that documents closely associated with environmental theology do not directly define the term. A definition for environmental theology was finally proposed in 2001 – "a term used to describe the God-environment relationship and divine expectations of human behavior in relation to the environment".

== Basic environmental theology ==
Environmental theology generally must include an understanding of God's relationship to the cosmos or creation, a cosmology. Robert J. Jacobus divides the possibilities into three basic views of God’s physical relationship with the environment. One, the Creator-God exists externally to the physical world (Timm, 1994). The second is that God exists internally in the environment. The third basic view stipulates God as an entity does not exist (Berry, 1994; Callicott, 1994; Swimme, 1994; Wei-ming, 1994). Three variations of these basic types can be identified in literature. The first is that the person of God can be distinctly separate from the environment and also exist internally in the environment.

A second variation purports that God and nature exist as separate deities. The third variation denies God as a cognitive entity and views the environment as creator/deity. If God is external to the environment God then the Creator-God interfaces with the environment as a distinct entity, while if God is internal to the environment, one may make no distinction between the person of God and the environment and the notion of creator itself may become problematic. A mystical viewpoint common to several religious traditions that unites these categories is that God is continuously creating the universe, and that the universe is a direct expression of God's being, rather than an object created by God as the subject.

From the environmental perspective, the corresponding worldviews would be (1) nature is created, (2) nature is divine and (3) nature is emergent. Three environmental theologies emerge, (1) God exists eternally and the environment is God's creation, (2) the environment is God and (3) the environment emerged from physical conditions. But philosopher Robert S. Corrington goes so far as to say that God is an emergent property of the cosmos itself.

There is not a clear distinction between environmental theology and ecotheology, though the term environmental theology might indicate a theology in which environmental ethics is established prior to one's understanding of the meaning of God.

== Discussions in environmental theology ==
Many discussions have been held since the publication of "The Historical Roots of our Ecological Crisis". The number of articles written regarding environmental theology increased substantially in the years after its publication. The peak number of publications occurred in 1971, with 80 articles written regarding environmentalism in the Judeo-Christian traditions. A vast majority of publications focuses on the concept of anthropocentrism being the driving force of our ecological crisis. Some articles support the concept of anthropocentrism. Constance Cumbey and David Hunt both published books in 1983 that refuted the ideas of White and other theologians; they instead discussed the idea that God did not care for the earth and that it was not up to man to care for it.

There are also those who believe that the teachings of environmental theology are too radical to have real-world effects. The Cornwall Alliance is a group that has formed to protest the ideology that anthropocentrism is the issue and instead teach it as the solution.

== See also ==
- Christian views on environmentalism
- Environmental philosophy
- Religion and environmentalism
- Spiritual ecology

== Bibliography ==
- Berry, T. (1994). Ecological geography. In M. E. Tucker & J. A. Grim (Eds.), Worldviews and ecology (pp. 228–237). Maryknoll, NY: Orbis Books.
- Callicott, J. B. (1994). Toward a global environmental ethic. In M. E. Tucker & J. A. Grim (Eds.), Worldviews and ecology (pp. 30–40). Maryknoll, NY: Orbis Books.
- Griffin, D. R. (1994) Whitehead's deeply ecological worldview. In M. E. Tucker & J. A. Grim (Eds.), Worldviews and ecology (pp. 190–206). Maryknoll, NY: Orbis Books.
- Jacobus, R. J. (2001). Defining environmental theology: Content analysis of associated literature. Master's thesis. West Virginia University, Morgantown. [On-line]. http://kitkat.wvu.edu:8080/files/1885.1.Jacobus_R_Theisis.pdf.
- Jacobus, R. J. (2004). Understanding environmental theology: A summary for environmental educators. The Journal of Environmental Education, 35(3) 35–42.
- Swimme, B. (1994). Cosmogenesis. In M. E. Tucker & J. A. Grim (Eds.), Worldviews and ecology (pp. 238–242). Maryknoll, NY: Orbis Books.
- Timm, R. E. (1994). The ecological fallout of Islamic creation theology. In M. E. Tucker & J. A. Grim (Eds.), Worldviews and ecology (pp. 83–95). Maryknoll, NY: Orbis Books.
- Tobias, M. (1994). Jainism and ecology. In M. E. Tucker & J. A. Grim (Eds.), Worldviews and ecology (pp. 138–149). Maryknoll, NY: Orbis Books.
- Wei-ming. T. (1994). Beyond the enlightenment mentality. In M. E. Tucker & J. A. Grim (Eds.), Worldviews and ecology (pp. 19–29). Maryknoll, NY: Orbis Books.
- White, L. Jr. (1967). The historical roots of our ecological crisis. Science, 155, 1203–1207
- White, R.A. (1994). A Baha’i perspective on an ecologically sustainable society. In M. E. Tucker & J. A. Grim (Eds.), Worldviews and ecology (pp. 96–112). Maryknoll, NY: Orbis Books.
