= İbrahim Özdemir =

Kurdish philosopher, academic and environmentalist

İbrahim Özdemir (born January 1, 1960) is a Kurdish philosopher, academic and Islamic environmentalist. He is a professor of philosophy at Uskudar University and Director General of the Department of Foreign Affairs, the Ministry of National Education, Turkey.

== Early life ==
Özdemir was born on January 1, 1960, in İslahiye, Gaziantep Province, Turkey. His father, Mustafa, was a farmer and illiterate man. His mother, Ayşe, was a housewife. He grew up in İslahiye and Mardin, where he attended a state boarding school (1974–78).

== Education ==
In 1980 he entered Divinity School of Ankara University, where he studied Islamic Philosophy, Theology, Intellectual History, and graduated in 1985. He started graduate studies at METU (Middle East Technical University), Department of Philosophy, Ankara. He studied for eleven years at METU to complete his studies. He studied with Teo Grünberg, Ahmet İnam, Alparslan Açıkgenç, Yasin Ceylan, Akın Ergüden, and Cemil Akdoğan. During his studies he had to worked as a consultant to the Prime Ministry's General Directorate of State Archives, (1987-1992).

He received his Ph.D. from METU in 1996. He presented his major paper, “Towards An Understanding Of Environmental Ethic From A Qur’anic Perspective”, to an International Conference on “Islam and Ecology” at Harvard University and later published as a chapter in Islam and Ecology, (Cambridge: Harvard Press, 2003).

He has traveled widely in the Muslim world and the West. He was visiting professor of Islamic Studies at Hartford University and Hartford Seminary. He lectured with Mary E. Tucker, at a seminar on Religion and Ecology at Gadjah Mada University, Jogyakarta, Indonesia, August 9–16, 2005.

He gives many public lectures and workshops in Turkey, Europe, the United States and other countries. His father died in 1988, and his mother died in 2009. He addresses different audiences about topics related to the philosophy of religion, world religions, environmental philosophy, sustainable development, religion and the environment, interreligious and intercultural dialogue and education.

== Ideas ==
Özdemir is known for his studies in environmental philosophy in general and Islamic environmentalism in particular. After finishing his dissertation, The Ethical Dimension of Human Attitude Towards Nature (1997), he focused on Religion and Ecology. He founded an elective course on Religion and Ecology at Ankara University, which was later accepted by many universities in Turkey. He presented papers on this topic and participated panel discussions and workshops at home and abroad. Discovering and understanding the meaning of biodiversity for a sustainable ecology, he comes to understand and appreciate the full implication of cultural diversity for a sustainable human society. Then, he began to study Rumis's work, the greatest Muslim poet and Sufi of the 13th century. Rumî's philosophy and ideas have made a profound impact on his perception of nature. For Rumî, a force—a secret energy—lies beneath the spiritual and material world, informing the invisible, progressive change in the universe (humanity included). This force is love, and it originates in God and moves towards God. The meaning of this understanding is clear for an environmentalist: Everything in the universe is interdependent and interconnected; everything's well-being is dependent on everything else.

In his first major work, The Ethical Dimension of Human Attitude Towards Nature, Özdemir suggested that there is a philosophical and ethical dimension to environmental problems. While the technological, scientific and other relevant dimensions of the problem are acknowledged, the main emphasis is given to the ethical dimension of the issue at hand. In addition, it is also argued that there is a direct and strong relationship between environmental problems and our understanding of nature. In other words, our treatment of and attitude towards natural objects mostly depend on how we understand and conceptualize the natural world as such. One of his major articles “The Development of Environmental Consciousness in Modern Turkey”, was published in Environmentalism in Muslim World, (ed. Richard Foltz, New York: Nova, 2005). He also contributed with three entries, “The Prophet Muhammad”, “Rumi”, and “Said Nursi” to in Encyclopedia of Religion and Nature, ed. Bron Taylor and Jeffrey Kaplan (New York: Continuum, 2003). His other works mainly were in Turkish and primarily focused on environmental and cultural studies. After working at the Ministry of National Education as Director General, he also interested in education in a comprehensive way and represented the Ministry at International Conferences held by UNESCO, Organisation for Economic Co-operation and Development (OECD), Council of Europe, European Union, etc.

Özdemir is the founder President of Society for Intercultural Research and Friendship, (1995).

== Bibliography ==
- The Ethical Dimension of Human Attitude Towards Nature, (Ankara: Ministry of Environment, 1997).
- Cevre ve Din (Environment and Religion), (Ankara: Ministry of Environment, 1997).
- Cevre Sorunlari ve Islam, (Environmental Problems and Islam) (Ankara: Presidency of Religious Affairs Press, 1995 and 2nd edition 1997).
- Yalnız Gezegen, (Lonely Planet: Essays on Environmental Ethics and Philosophy) (Istanbul: Kaynak, 2001).
- Postmodern Dusunceler (Potmodern Thoughts: Essays On philosophy, philosophy of Science, and Postmodernity), (Istanbul: Kaynak Yayinlari, 2002).
- Globalization, Ethics and Islam, editors: Ian Markham and Ibrahim Ozdemir, Aldershot: Ashgate. 2005.
- Care for Creation; An Islamic Perspective, Viverealtrimenti, London, 2022.

== Books ==
- Globalization, Ethics and Islam, editors: Ian Markham and Ibrahim Ozdemir, Aldershot: Ashgate. 2005
- The Ethical Dimension of Human Attitude Towards Nature, Ministry of Environment, Ankara, 1997. (Out of Print)
- Environment and Religion (Çevre ve Din), Ministry of Environment, Ankara, 1997.
- Environmental Problems and Islam(Çevre Sorunları ve İslam), DIB Yay, Ankara, 1995. (with Munir Yukselmis).
- Lonely Planet: Essays on Environmental Ethics and Philosophy, (Yalnız Gezegen) Kaynak, Istanbul, 2001.
- Postmodern Thoughts (Postmodern Düşünceler), Kaynak Yayınları, Istanbul, 2001.

== Translations ==
- 'Mevalana Celaleddin Rumi'. Aşkta ve Yaratıcılıkta Yeniden Doğuş, Reza Arasteh, Kitabiyat, Ankara, 2000.
- 'Newton's Science in the Context of Religion', Prof. Dr. Ernest-Wolf Gazo, (Din Bağlamında Newton’un Bilim Anlayışı), İslami Araştırmalar Dergisi, c. 6, sayı: 4.ı
- 'Islam and Democracy', Robin Wright, (İslam ve Demokrasi: Yenilenmeyle İlgili İki Görüşü), Yeni Dergi, Sayı:10, 1997.
- 'Sürdürülebilir Kalkınma Ahlakı', Ronald Engel, çeviri, A.Ü. İlahiyat Fakültesi Dergisi, Prof. Dr. Necati Öner Armağanı, c. XL, s255-271, 1999.
- Yol Ayrımındaki İslâm Araştırmalar Üzerine Düşünceler
- Batı’da Ve İslam’da Allah Anlayışına Felsefi Bir Yaklaşım
- Kur’an Bağlamında Bir Felsefe Kavramı
- Muhammed Alexander Russell Webb Osmanlının İlk New York Başkonsolosu
- Aşkta ve Yaratıcılıkta Yeniden Doğmak: Erick Fromm’un Gözüyle Mevlana

== See also ==
- Environmental philosophy
- Mawil Izzi Dien
- Interfaith dialogue
