= Karen Baker-Fletcher =

American professor of theology

Karen Baker-Fletcher is an American theologian and professor notable for her womanist scholarship, particularly on the crucifixion and resurrection. She is currently Professor of Systematic Theology at Southern Methodist University's Perkins School of Theology in Dallas, Texas.

== Early life and education ==
Baker-Fletcher earned her Bachelor of Arts in Philosophy and French from Wellesley College in 1981. She then went on to earn her Master of Divinity from Harvard Divinity School in 1984, with a concentration in Theology and Literature, followed by both her Master of Arts in Religious Studies and Theology in 1987 and Doctor of Philosophy in Theology and Literature in 1981 from the Harvard Graduate School of Arts and Sciences.

Baker-Fletcher is a member at a United Methodist church in Dallas, Texas.

== Career and scholarship ==
Baker-Fletcher's scholarship approaches the narratives of the crucifixion and resurrection of Jesus through a womanist lens that privileges the lived experiences of Black women. Her research interests include process theism, womanist theology, Wesleyan theology, ecotheology, and cultural studies. In her 2006 book Dancing with God, she examines the Trinity in relation to the reality of unnecessary violence. Christology and creation are recurring theological themes in her scholarship.

Baker-Fletcher is currently Professor of Systematic Theology at Perkins School of Theology. She has previously taught at Claremont School of Theology in California.

Baker-Fletcher delivered an Antoinette Brown Lecture at Vanderbilt University Divinity School. Baker-Fletcher is a member of the Society for the Study of Black Religion.

== Books ==
- Inspired Dust, Resurrected Dust: Womanist Reflections on Resurrection (forthcoming)
- Homemade Psalms—Womanist Poetry and Prose (forthcoming)
- Dancing With God: A Womanist Perspective on the Trinity (St. Louis: Chalice Press, 2006)
- Sisters of Dust, Sisters of Spirit: Womanist Wordings on God and Creation (Minneapolis: Fortress Press, 1998)
- My Sister, My Brother: Womanist and Xodus God-Talk (Maryknoll: Orbis, 1997) (with Garth Kasimu Baker-Fletcher)
- A Singing Something: Womanist Reflections on Anna Julia Cooper (New York: Crossroad, 1994)
