= Basheer Ahmad Masri =

Indian Islamic scholar

- Born: 1914; Qadian
- Died: 1992 (aged 77–78)
- Occupation: Writer

Al-Hafiz Basheer Ahmad Masri (1914–1992) was an Indian Islamic scholar and animal welfare writer. He has been described as the "most prominent contemporary voice in articulating Islamic concern for non-human animals".

== Biography ==
Masri was born in Qadian and obtained his B.A. in Arabic from the Government College University, Lahore in 1938. He spent 20 years in East Africa (1941–1961) working as a school headmaster. He moved to England in 1961 and was joint-editor of the Islamic monthly magazine, The Islamic Review for six years. In 1964, he was the first Sunni Muslim to be appointed Imam of Shah Jahan Mosque. He retired from Shah Jehan Mosque in 1968.

== Animal welfare ==
Masri was involved with animal welfare organizations and spent three years touring many countries to gain knowledge of Islamic culture. He has been cited as a pioneer of animal welfare activism in Islam who has strengthened Muslim understandings of Islamic obligations to animal welfare. He worked with the World Society for the Protection of Animals and Compassion in World Farming (CIWF) who asked him to write about Islam and animal welfare. He was the first Muslim to write on animal experimentation and Islam for the International Association Against Painful Experiments on Animals (IAAPEA). Masri delineated four principles for the advocacy of animals in Islam: All nonhuman animals are a trust from God; equigenic rights do exist and must be maintained; all nonhuman animals live in communities; all nonhuman animals possess personhood.

Mari's 1989 book Animals in Islam was republished by Lantern Books in 2022. His 2007 book Animal Welfare in Islam has been cited as espousing semi-vegetarianism. Masri noted that "Islam has left the option of eating meat to one's discretion" but praised vegetarianism for its ethical virtues. Masri criticized the consumption of animal products that come from factory farms and the Westernised meat industry as being unethical due to the amount of suffering involved and suggested that if Muslims were informed about the gruesome details of factory farming they would "become vegetarians rather than eat such sacrilegious meat".

Masri argued that if Muhammad was alive today he would not approve of the modern cruel methods of intensive animal farming and he would condemn those who practice such methods, in the same way he condemned similar cruelties in his day.

== Selected publications ==
- Islamic Concern for Animals (Compassion in World Farming Trust, 1987)
- Animals in Islam (Compassion in World Farming Trust, 1989)
- Animal Welfare in Islam (Islamic Foundation, 2007)
- The Principles of Animal Advocacy in Islam: Four Integrated Ecognitions (Society & Animals, 2011)
