= Anna M. Gade =

American Islamic scholar

- Born: Anna M. Gade; Berkeley, California

Academic background
- Education: Swarthmore College (BA); University of Chicago (MA, PhD)

Academic work
- Institutions: University of Wisconsin-Madison
- Notable works: Muslim Environmentalisms; The Qur’an: An Introduction; Perfection Makes Practice

Anna M. Gade is an American scholar of Islam, religion and ethics, Southeast Asia and environmental studies. She is Vilas Distinguished Achievement Professor in the Gaylord Nelson Institute for Environmental Studies at the University of Wisconsin-Madison where she teaches courses in Environmental Humanities, Islamic Studies, and the academic study of religion and ethics in the Religious Studies Program. Her influential book, Muslim Environmentalisms (2019), has defined Islamic environmental studies across multiple fields, including environmental humanities. Her current academic work focuses in the comparative field of environmental ethics, along with ongoing research programs on climate and sustainability issues in the Global South.

Gade's early work was in the field of Qur'anic studies and the academic study of religion. Her book, Perfection Makes Practice, has been foundational to academic work theorizing affect and emotion in religious ritual and practice, focusing on the Qur'an as a living recited text for learning, memorization and performance; this was followed by her popular book, The Qur'an: An Introduction. In the field of Southeast Asian Studies, she helped to write The Cham Rebellion by Ysa Osman, witnessing first-person accounts of Muslim survivors among the Chams in Cambodia, and providing key evidence for the international Khmer Rouge Tribunal. Since the 1990s, much of her field-based research has been conducted in Indonesia.

== Biography ==
Gade graduated from Berkeley High School (California) and she completed her B. A. in mathematics at Swarthmore College, in Swarthmore, Pennsylvania, with courses also at Harvard University. She holds a master's from the University of Chicago and received her Ph.D. with distinction in the history of religions from the University of Chicago Divinity School, specializing in Islam. She has held teaching positions at different institutions in the United States and abroad including Cornell University (Near Eastern Studies), Princeton University (Music/Religion), Oberlin College (Religion), Victoria University of Wellington, New Zealand (Religious Studies), and in Languages and Cultures of Asia at University of Wisconsin-Madison. She has also held positions as visiting professor at Universitas Gadjah Mada and UIII (Universitas Islam Internasional Indonesia). Prof. Gade travels the world giving talks and lectures on Islam and religion, ethics and the humanities, and sustainability and the environment.

== Books ==
- Perfection Makes Practice: Learning, Emotion, and the Recited Qur’an in Indonesia (University of Hawai'i Press, 2004)
- The Cham Rebellion: Survivors' Stories from the Villages, by Ysa Osman (Revising Editor, Documentation Center of Cambodia, 2006)
- The Qur’an: An Introduction (Oneworld Publications, 2010)
- Muslim Environmentalisms: Religious and Social Foundations (Columbia University Press, 2019)
- Environmental and Sustainablity Ethics (forth.)

== Selected articles ==
- "Muslim Environmentalisms and Environmental Ethics: Theory and Practice for Rights and Justice.".The Muslim World 113 : 3 : 242-59 (2023)

== See also ==
- Kecia Ali
- Richard Foltz
- Freya Mathews
- Ingrid Mattson
- Carolyn Merchant
- Seyyed Hossein Nasr
- Val Plumwood
- Omid Safi
- Anna Tsing
