= Environmental virtue ethics =

Way of approaching environmental ethics through the lens of virtue ethics

Environmental virtue ethics (EVE) is a way of approaching environmental ethics through the lens of virtue ethics.

As Louke Van Wensveen points out, almost all environmental literature employs virtue language.

Early interest in applying virtue theory to environmental problems can be found in disparate articles in academic and environmental journals, such as Thomas Hill's "Ideals of Human Excellence and Preserving Natural Environments." A major analysis of this approach is Louke Van Wensveen’s influential book Dirty Virtues: The Emergence of Ecological Virtue Ethics.

There are three general approaches to identifying virtues and vices within EVE. First, the "virtue theory approach," which attempts to build an environmental virtue ethics from the ground up. Second, the "environmental exemplar approach," which looks to people who are generally considered to be environmentally virtuous as models. And, finally, the "extensionist approach," which takes traditional virtues and extends them to operate in an environmentally meaningful way. While some authors take one of these approaches, others combine elements from two or more.
