= Mark I. Wallace =

Mark Irvy Wallace
- Mark Irvy Wallace
- Occupation: Professor of Religion
- Employer: Swarthmore College

Mark Irvy Wallace is an American Professor of Religion at Swarthmore College, where he teaches courses on religion, environmental studies, and Interpretation theory. A self-described "Christian Animist", his teaching and research interests focus on the intersections between Christian theology, critical theory, environmental studies, and postmodernism as a part of the field of ecological theology. Through his work he seeks to "bring together biblical faith and the liberal arts."

== Education ==
He obtained his B.A. in Religious Studies with honors from University of California, Santa Barbara (1978). He received his M.Div. from Princeton Theological Seminary in 1982, and his PhD in Theology (advised by Paul Ricœur) from University of Chicago in 1986.

== Academic career ==
Prior to teaching at Swarthmore College, Wallace was an instructor at the Princeton Theological Seminary Summer School, Assistant Professor of Philosophy at Georgia State University, and a lecturer in Religious Studies at Merrimack College. He currently serves on the editorial boards of several academic journals, including HTS Teologiese Studies/Theological Studies; Contagion: Journal of Violence, Mimesis, and Culture; Journal for the Study of Religion, Nature and Culture; Études Ricoeuriennes/Ricoeur Studies; and Worldviews: Global Religions, Culture, and Ecology.

At Swarthmore College, Wallace teaches in and oversees the Chester Semester Fellowship, a semester based course that engages students with texts about Chester and direct community work with various organizations and leaders. The Fellowship's website describes the program's purpose as "to facilitate committed student engagement with visionary leaders in the city of Chester and focuses on critically understanding and helping to ameliorate some of society’s most pressing real-world problems by requiring students to participate in civic volunteer programs throughout the academic year."

== Personal life ==
Mark Wallace grew up in Los Angeles, CA. His interest in theology was piqued after hearing a sermon by Billy Graham. Through working with Paul Ricoeur, Wallace's outlook on Christianity changed from an anthropocentric view focused on private salvation to a biocentric view focusing on ecology, the earth, and the cosmos.

== Awards and honors ==
=== Awards ===
When God Was a Bird won the 2019 Gold Nautilus Book Award in the category of "Religion / Spirituality of Western Thought".

=== Honors ===
Selected honors include: Eugene M. Lang Foundation and The Andrew W. Mellon Foundation Periclean Faculty Leadership Fellowship (2020–21); Japan International Christian University Foundation Visiting Scholar (2008); Andrew W. Mellon New Directions for Scholars-Teachers Fellowship (2003-2004); ACLS Contemplative Practice Fellowship (2000); AAR Research Grant (1992); NEH Scholar, Georgia State University Humanities Workshop (October 4, 1988). His research has been supported by the American Council of Learned Societies, the Andrew W. Mellon Foundation, the Eugene M. Lang Foundation, the American Academy of Religion, and the National Endowment of the Humanities.

== Selected publications ==
=== Articles ===
A select number of his works are freely available online.

=== Books ===
- Wallace, Mark I. (2019). When God Was a Bird: Christianity, Animism, and the Reenchantment of the World. New York: Fordham University Press. ISBN 9780823281312.
- Wallace, Mark I. (2010). Green Christianity: Five Ways to a Sustainable Future. Minneapolis: Fortress Press. ISBN 9780800664619.
- Wallace, Mark I. (2005). Finding God in the Singing River: Christianity, Spirit, Nature. Minneapolis: Fortress Press. ISBN 0800637267.
- Wallace, Mark I. (1996). Fragments of the Spirit: Nature, Violence, and the Renewal of Creation. New York: Continuum Publishing Company. ISBN 0826409032.
- Ricoeur, Paul (1995). Wallace, Mark I. (ed.). Figuring the Sacred: Religion, Narrative, Imagination. Translated by Pellauer, David. Fortress Press. ISBN 0800628942.
- Wallace, Mark I.; Smith, Theophus, eds. (1994). Curing Violence. Sonoma: Polebridge Press. ISBN 0944344437.
- Wallace, Mark I. (1990). The Second Naiveté: Barth, Ricoeur, and the New Yale Theology. Macon: Mercer University Press. ISBN 9780865543805.
