= Faith in Place =

American non-profit organization

- Founded: 1999
- Location: 1100 E 55th St., AC-1, Chicago, Illinois, 60615
- Region served: Illinois, Indiana, and Wisconsin
- Product: sustainable energy and sustainable farm-grown and prepared foods
- Method: Workshops, interfaith networking, cooperative building
- Key people: Reverend Clare Butterfield, founder and Brian Sauder, Executive Director
- Employees: 28
- Website: faithinplace.org

Faith in Place is an American organization based in Chicago, Illinois, that coordinates religious leaders to address environmental sustainability issues. Partnering with religious congregations, Faith in Place promotes sustainable energy and sustainable farming. Since 1999, Faith in Place has partnered with over 700 congregations in Illinois.

Faith in Place has established cooperative fair trade markets, and, for a time, the Eco-Halal cooperative for "Muslim consumers to purchase sustainably raised lamb, chicken, and beef".

== History ==
Started in 1999, as a project of the Center for Neighborhood Technology, it later incorporated as an independent organization. Initially the group worked in seven location to develop projects and then expanded to regional coordination. In 2003 they incorporated officially and moved to independent offices in late 2004.

== Activities and projects ==
Faith in Place works with religious organizations in an effort to "promote stewardship of the Earth as a moral obligation".

=== Illinois Interfaith Power & Light Campaign ===
Their Illinois Interfaith Power & Light Campaign helps various religious groups conserve energy, purchase clean energy and advocates for conservation. Faith in Place is the Illinois chapter of the national Interfaith Power & Light campaign. They assisted the Jewish Reconstructionist Congregation in building the nation's first certified green synagogue. Another project they facilitated was Mosque Foundation in Bridgeview becoming the United States' first mosque to go solar.

== See also ==
- Ecotheology
- Religion and environmentalism
- Christianity and environmentalism
- Evangelical environmentalism
- Spiritual ecology
- Lutheran Volunteer Corps

== Notes ==
- Chicago Public Radio (WBEZ), interview with Clare Butterfield, August 2005.
