= Fazlun Khalid =

British ecotheologian

Fazlun Khalid (born 1932 in Colombo, Sri Lanka) is a Sri Lankan born British Islamic ecotheologian and the Founder-Director of the Islamic Foundation for Ecology and Environmental Science based in Birmingham, England. He has served as director of training at the Alliance of Religions and Conservation and as a consultant for World Wildlife Fund.

== Biography ==
Fazlun Khalid began his career in the British Royal Air Force, then joined the British Civil Service, working at the Commission for Racial Equality for twenty-three years. Upon his retirement, reading the works of Alvin Toffler, Al-Hafiz B.A. Masri, and Seyyed Hossein Nasr convinced him to devote the remainder of his life to raising environmental consciousness among Muslims. Since founding IFEES in 1994 he has spent much of his time traveling to Muslim communities around the world initiating environmental education projects in contexts as diverse as Tanzania, Saudi Arabia, Madagascar, and Indonesia.

Khalid has been described as "the single most active 'Islamic' environmentalist alive today". Grist Magazine included him as the only Muslim among fifteen world leaders in religious environmentalism, calling him "the foremost expert on ecology from an Islamic Perspective". In 2004 Khalid received the Fazlur Rahman Khan Award for excellence in Engineering, Science and Technology. The Independent on Sunday ranked him 81st among Britain's top 100 environmentalists.

In September 2009 Khalid was invited by United Nations Secretary General Ban Ki-moon to participate in the Climate Change Summit in New York City. He was invited to speak at the Vatican in October 2010 as part of the interfaith initiative "Building Bridges of Hope: Success Stories and Strategies for Interfaith Action". In January 2011 he was invited to chair a workshop on "The Faith Factor: Religion's Role in Addressing Global Trends and Challenges" at the World Economic Forum Annual Meeting in Davos, Switzerland, where he was joined by Ex-US President Bill Clinton.

== Published works ==
- Editor, with Joanne O'Brien, Islam and Ecology, London: Cassell, 1992.
- "Guardians of the Natural Order", Our Planet 8/2, 1996.
- "Islam, Ecology, and Modernity: An Islamic Critique of the Root Causes of Environmental Degradation", in Richard Foltz, Frederick Denny, and Azizan Baharuddin, eds., Islam and Ecology: A Bestowed Trust, Cambridge, MA: Harvard University Press, 2003, pp. 299–322.
- "Applying Islamic Environmental Ethics", in Richard Foltz, ed., Environmentalism in the Muslim World, New York: Nova Science, 2005, pp. 87–111.
- "The Copenhagen Syndrome: The Financial Crisis and the Environment, an Islamic Perspective", Globalia magazine, 12 January 2010 http://www.globaliamagazine.com/?id=896
- "Signs on the Earth: Islam, Modernity and the Climate Crisis", Kube Publishing, 2019
