= Religion and environmentalism =

Interdisciplinary subfield

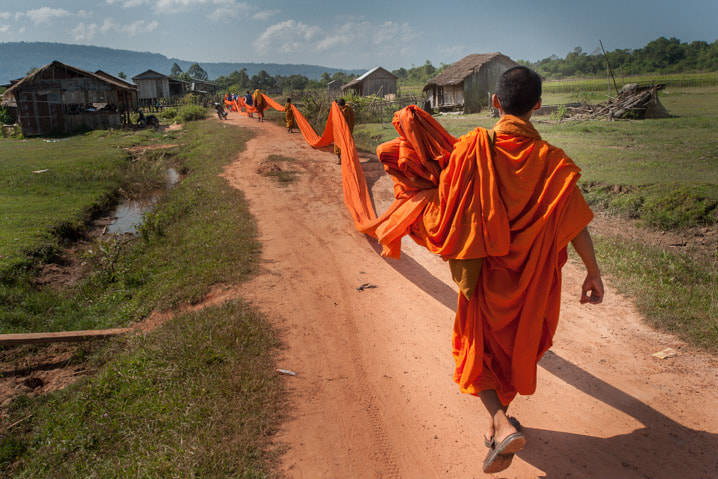
Buddhist monks in Cambodia on a march in the Areng Valley in support of environmental conservation.

Religion and environmentalism is an emerging interdisciplinary subfield in the academic disciplines of religious studies, religious ethics, the sociology of religion, and theology amongst others, with environmentalism and ecological principles as a primary focus.

Within the context of Christianity, in the encyclical "Laudato si'", Pope Francis called to fight climate change and ecological degradation as a whole. He claimed that humanity is facing a severe ecological crisis and blamed consumerism and irresponsible development. The encyclical is addressed to "every person living on this planet."

Buddhism includes many principles linked to sustainability. The Dalai Lama has consistently called for strong climate action, reforestation, preserving ecosystems, a reduction in meat consumption. He declared that if he will ever join a political party it will be the green party and if Buddha returned to our world now: "Buddha would be green." The leaders of Buddhism issued a special declaration calling on all believers to fight climate change and environmental destruction as a whole.

== General overview ==
=== Crisis of values ===
This subfield is founded on the understanding that, in the words of Iranian-American philosopher Seyyed Hossein Nasr, "the environmental crisis is fundamentally a crisis of values," and that religions, being a primary source of values in any culture, are thus implicated in the decisions humans make regarding the environment. For example, a 2020 study shows that religion, as the primary source of values for religious people, can help narrow the political gap between liberals and conservatives over environmental protection.

=== Burden of guilt ===
Historian Lynn White Jr. made the argument in a 1966 lecture before the American Academy of Arts and Sciences, subsequently published in the journal Science, that Western Christianity, having de-sacralized and instrumentalized nature to human ends, bears a substantial "burden of guilt" for the contemporary environmental crisis. White's essay stimulated a flurry of responses, ranging from defenses of Christianity to qualified admissions to complete agreement with his analysis.

=== Eastern religions and indigenous peoples ===
Some proposed that Eastern religions, as well as those of indigenous peoples, neo-pagans, and others, offered more eco-friendly worldviews than Christianity. A third, more obscure camp, argued that while White's theory was indeed correct, this was actually a benefit to society, and that thinning the populations of weaker plant and animal species via environmental destruction would lead to the evolution of stronger, more productive creatures. See Kaitiaki in Māori religion.

=== Religion and ecology ===
By the 1990s, many scholars of religion had entered the debate and begun to generate a substantial body of literature discussing and analyzing how nature is valued in the world's various religious systems. A landmark event was a series of ten conferences on Religion and Ecology organized by Yale University professors Mary Evelyn Tucker and John Grim and held at the Harvard University Center for the Study of World Religions from 1996 to 1998. More than 800 international scholars, religious leaders, and environmentalists participated in the conference series. The conferences concluded at the United Nations and at the American Museum of Natural History with more than 1,000 people in attendance. Papers from the conferences were published in a series of ten books (The Religions of the World and Ecology Book Series), one for each of the world's major religious traditions.

From these conferences, Tucker and Grim would form the Yale Forum on Religion and Ecology. The Forum has been instrumental in the creation of scholarship, in forming environmental policy, and in the greening of religion. In addition to their work with the Forum, Tucker and Grim's work continues in the Journey of the Universe film, book, and educational DVD series. It continues to be the largest international multireligious project of its kind.

An active Religion and Ecology group has been in existence within the American Academy of Religion since 1991, and an increasing number of universities in North America and around the world are now offering courses on religion and the environment. Recent scholarship on the field of religion and ecology can be found in the peer-reviewed academic journal Worldviews: Global Religions, Culture, and Ecology and in reference works such as the encyclopedia The Spirit of Sustainability.

Understanding the unique role religious leaders and faith-based communities have in play in the field of conservation, the World Wide Fund for Nature (WWF) established its Sacred Earth: Faiths for Conservation initiative by partnering with faith groups to deliver effective and sustainable conservation strategies.

=== Religion and nature ===
Another landmark in the emerging field was the publication of the Encyclopedia of Religion and Nature in 2005, which was edited by Bron Taylor. Taylor also led the effort to form the International Society for the Study of Religion, Nature and Culture, which was established in 2006, and began publishing the quarterly Journal for the Study of Religion, Nature and Culture in 2007.

== Religions and the environment ==
=== Interfaith cooperation ===
Formed in 1992, GreenFaith is a global interfaith environmental coalition with more than 100 chapters (called "Circles") in the Pacific Islands, North America, Australia, Asia, Latin America, Africa, and Europe as well as religious partners in over 40 countries. Focusing on grassroots activism, they encourages religious communities to invest in green energy, divest from fossil fuels, and publicly advocate for climate justice on a religious basis. As an example of their activism, in 2015, GreenFaith led the Una Terra, Una Familglia Humana (lit. 'One Earth, One Human Family') Climate Change March in Vatican City.

In 2015, over 150 leaders from various faiths issued a joint statement to the UN Climate Summit in Paris 2015 ahead of the United Nations Climate Change Conference, COP21 in Paris in December 2015. In it they reiterated a statement made at the interfaith summit in New York made in September 2014:

We as religious leaders: "stand together to express deep concern for the consequences of climate change on the earth and its people, all entrusted, as our faiths reveal, to our common care. Climate change is indeed a threat to life. Life is a precious gift we have received and that we need to care for".

The Interfaith Center for Sustainable Development (ICSD), a non-profit organization based in Jerusalem, led by rabbi Yonatan Neril promotes cooperation between religions for ensuring sustainability.

=== Buddhism ===
Buddhism includes many principles linked to sustainability. The Dalai Lama has consistently called for strong climate action, reforestation, preserving ecosystems, and a reduction in meat consumption. He declared that if he will ever join a political party it will be the green party and if Buddha returned to our world now: "Buddha would be green." The leaders of Buddhism issued a special declaration calling on all believers to fight climate change and environmental destruction as a whole.

The historical Buddha and other prominent Buddhist figures gave many teachings and instructions on the importance of caring for the environment. These narratives were later written down and compiled in the Buddhist sacred scriptures.

Buddhism teaches that all things are interconnected on both gross and subtle levels. It teaches that by observing how everything in life happens due to causes and conditions coming together, people come to see how everything is interconnected in a complex web of causality. Because humans are entwined with natural systems, damage done upon the Earth is also harm done to humans. Through contemplation and investigation, people can begin to develop an understanding which takes them beyond intellectual understanding, leading humans towards realisation of more subtle and profound aspects of interdependent origination. When people have developed this true feeling of interconnectedness, it will naturally influence the way in which humans relate to the external world.

In the First Turning of the Dharma wheel, it is taught that attachment is a cause of suffering. Siddhartha Gautama, the founder of Buddhism, spent his life searching to understand what is human suffering, what is it causes and how can one liberate themselves from this suffering.

In the Buddhist tradition, the recognition of suffering as a universal experience shared by all sentient beings forms the foundation for cultivating the aspiration to alleviate their suffering. This perspective is rooted in the belief that all beings have, at some point in the vast expanse of time, been our benevolent caregivers, leading to a sense of gratitude and a desire to reciprocate their kindness. Through this understanding, compassion towards all sentient beings emerges, driven by the intention to alleviate their suffering and the underlying causes of suffering. Buddhism emphasizes that the exposure to teachings and texts is insufficient for inner transformation; true change arises from contemplation and practical application in our daily lives. Cultivating compassion requires dedicated training and practice, fostering habitual tendencies that prioritize the well-being of others. This process not only nurtures a more harmonious relationship with others and the environment but also contributes to personal growth and spiritual development.

Buddha taught that a balance must be established between self-destruction and self-indulgence. These days much emphasis is placed on the economic and social aspects of life and environmental aspects are often overlooked. When human preferences are leveled by developing compassion and equanimity, there is balance and harmony within the mind which has an impact on our actions of body and speech.

In summary, Buddhism provides a structured framework that aims to create not only short-term solutions to amending the broken relationship between humanity and nature, but it also teaches people how to fulfill their ultimate collective aspirations.

==== The Dalai Lama ====
The Dalai Lama has done much to promote environmental awareness and support initiatives that help protect the environment.

In a meeting with the U.S. Ambassador to the Republic of India Timothy J. Roemer, the Dalai Lama urged the U.S. to engage China on climate change in Tibet. The Dalai Lama has also been part of a series on discussions organised by the Mind and Life Institute; a non-profit organisation that specializes the relationship between science and Buddhism. The talks were partly about ecology, ethics, and interdependence, and issues on global warming were brought up.

In 2010 he published the book Our Only Home: A Climate Appeal to the World and in January 2021 was engaged in conversation on The Crisis of Climate Feedback Loops with Greta Thunberg and leading scientists William Moomaw and Susan Natali.

==== The 17th Gyalwang Karmapa, Ogyen Trinley Dorje ====
The 17th Gyalwang Karmapa, Ogyen Trinley Dorje is an environmentalist who often incorporates this theme into his teachings and public talks.

In 2007 during the Kagyu Monlam Chenmo, he suggested that planting a single tree can be more beneficial than performing life release for many beings, and recommended that monasteries should plant one to two thousand trees. In addition he urged monks to practise restraint when sponsors offer technology upgrades.

In 2008 he established the Khoryug network meaning "environment" in Tibetan. He helped to connect over 50 monasteries, nunneries and centres throughout India, Nepal and Bhutan in the Himalayas and South India, who jointly made the commitment to help protect the Himalayan region from environmental degradation by acting in sustainable and environmentally friendly ways. In 2008 he published Environmental Guidelines for Karma Kagyu Buddhist Monasteries, which address environmental issues such as forest, water, and wildlife protection, waste management, and ways to tackle climate change by offering solutions based on the most recent scientific and practical knowledge available.

In 2009, the Karmapa approached the WWF to assist the Khoryug network. As a result, more than 55 environmental projects such as solar panel installation were implemented by Khoryug monasteries.

In 2009 he published the book The Future Is Now: Timely Advice for Creating a Better World which offers advice on caring for the environment. In 2015 he published the book The Heart is Noble: Changing the World from the Inside Out where he shares his vision for bringing social action into daily life, and in 2017 he published the book Interconnected: Embracing Life in Our Global Society which explores the interconnected relationships we have with family, community, and the rest of humanity, and how through these relationships we can become effective agents of social and ethical change. He also published a booklet entitled "One Hundred and Eight Things you can do to help the Environment" which was released on Earth Day, on 22 April 2009.

At the second conference on environmental protection (3 to 8 October 2009, Gyuto Monastery), he stated:

For too long, people have behaved thoughtlessly and ignored the damage to the environment that they are creating and, if this continued there was a great danger that it would be too late to do anything.

On 24 October 2009, Ogyen Trinley Dorje supported international climate action day at a gathering at McLeod Ganj in northern India.

In 2014, during his first European world tour he said:

We should never exploit the world we live in for the purpose of short-term benefits. Rather than considering the Earth as a material thing, we should consider it as a mother who nurtures us; from generation to generation we need this loving mother.

In spring 2015, he participated in a two-month tour of the United States, where he visited six major universities, and delivered public talks focusing on environmental protection and compassionate activism. At this time he was awarded Yale's prestigious Chubb Fellowship, and at The University of Redlands he was awarded an honorary doctorate degree.

==== Choje Akong Tulku Rinpoche ====
Choje Akong Tulku Rinpoche was actively engaged in helping protect the environment. In the Tibetan Areas of China through the Rokpa charity, he established a programme of reforestation over a period of several years and in on the Holy Mountain of Drakkar he arranged for local people to be employed as rangers, to protect their local flora and fauna. Seeing that that new demand was driving the herbs used in Tibetan medicine close to extinction, he initiated a pioneering project to preserve them by bringing three young doctors to the Royal Botanical Garden Edinburgh to study horticulture and biodynamics.

==== Lama Yeshe Losal Rinpoche ====
Lama Yeshe Losal Rinpoche works to spread environmental awareness through his teachings and public talks. He is the founder of The Holy Isle project on Holy Island, Firth of Clyde, which was purchased by the Rokpa Trust in 1992. Lama Yeshe's vision is to create a peaceful, sacred space, guided by environmental considerations for people of all faiths and religions. Since acquiring the island up to 50 thousand indigenous trees have been planted as part of the "Trees for Peace" project. This was developed in consultation with the Scottish Forestry Commission, the Scottish Office, the Farming and Wildlife Advisory Group, and other environmental experts, and has helped to recreate a woodland habitat to support biodiversity. A designated nature reserve for native animals, birds, and sea life has been created on the east side of the island, and at the north end of the island, there is the Centre of World Peace and Health, whose design and construction are based upon environmental sustainability, sensitive to the ecology of its unique environment. In creating a place where humans and animals can live in peace and harmony, Holy Isle has become a model of environmentally friendly living.

==== Thích Nhất Hạnh ====
In 2014, Thích Nhất Hạnh addressed the United Nations Framework Convention on Climate Change:

Our love and admiration for the Earth has the power to unite us and remove all boundaries, separation and discrimination. Centuries of individualism and competition have brought about tremendous destruction and alienation. We need to re-establish true communication–true communion–with ourselves, with the Earth, and with one another as children of the same mother.

=== Christianity ===
The status of nature in Christianity has been hotly debated, especially since historian Lynn White published the now classic "The historical roots of present-day ecologic crisis" in 1967. In it, White blames Christianity for the modern environmental crisis, which he concludes is largely due to the dominance of a Christian worldview in the West that is exploitative of nature in an unsustainable manner. He asserts that proponents of the Judeo-Christian ethic are anti-ecological, hostile towards nature, and view nature as something separate from humanity, to be exploited by mankind. This exploitative attitude, combined with new technology and the industrial revolution, has wreaked havoc on the natural world. Colonial forestry is a prime example of ecological destruction that also involves the destruction of native faiths. See the "Burden of guilt" section above.

==== Catholic Church ====
Pope Francis demonstrated his concerns about protecting the environment and indigenous peoples in his first-ever address to an international audience at World Youth Day 2013 in Rio De Janeiro, Brazil. Having heard about the plight of the Amazon rainforests in Brazil, he called for "respect and protection of the entire creation which God has entrusted to man." Under his guidance, The Global Catholic Climate Movement (GCCM) was established, offering advice on how to live in harmony with our environment by transforming our lifestyles, as well as calling for bold public policies to tackle climate change.

At the beginning of the 21st century, Pope Francis published the encyclical Laudato si', a document calling humanity to preserve the sustainability of the biosphere. The encyclical is taught in the academy of the Sustainable Development Goals The document is also called: "on care for our common home." In the encyclical, the pope calls to fight climate change and ecological degradation as a whole. He claims that humanity is facing a severe ecological crisis and blames consumerism and non-responsible development. The encyclical is addressed to "every person living on this planet."

Following Laudato Si, the Global Catholic Climate Movement was founded in 2015, which in 2021, changed its name to the Laudato Si Movement, is a global network of over 900 Catholic organizations and over 10,000 trained grassroots leaders known as Laudato Si' Animators.

==== Latter Day Saint movement ====
Mormon environmentalists find theological reasons for stewardship and conservationism through biblical and additional scriptural references including a passage from the Doctrine and Covenants: "And it pleaseth God that he hath given all these things unto man; for unto this end were they made to be used, with judgment, not to excess, neither by extortion" (D&C 59:20). The Latter Day Saint movement has a complex relationship with environmental concerns, involving not only the religion but politics and economics. In terms of environmentally friendly policies, the Church of Jesus Christ of Latter-day Saints has a history of utilizing elements of conservationist policies for their meetinghouses.

The church first placed solar panels on a church meetinghouse in the Tuamotu Islands in 2007. In 2010, the church unveiled five LEED certified meetinghouse prototypes that are that will be used as future meetinghouse designs around the world, the first one having been completed in 2010 in Farmington, Utah.

=== Hinduism ===
In Hinduism, practitioners and scholars find traditional approaches to the natural environment in such concepts as dharmic ethics or prakrti (material creation), the development of ayurveda, and readings of vedic literature. Hindu environmental activism also may be inspired by Gandhian philosophy and practical struggles, such as the Bishnoi community in Rajasthan and Chipko resistance to forestry policies in Uttar Pradesh, India.

Mahatma Gandhi played a major role in Indian environmentalism and has been called the "father of Indian environmentalism". Gandhi's environmental thought parallels his social thoughts in that environmental sustainability and social inequalities should be managed in similar fashions. His non-violent teachings left a lasting impact, even agriculturally. Contemporary agrarian practices use the Bhagavad-Gita to establish practices that are deemed non-violent.

=== Islam ===
The Quran and the Prophetic Traditions [sayings and actions of Muhammad] make it clear that the environment is a blessing and a sign of the divine. The Quran refers to natural phenomena numerous times and compels readers to ponder over the environment as a reflection of the truth – a signpost to a designer. One can gain profound knowledge from nature, so human beings are to preserve it and look after it.

The concept of humanity having 'Khilafah' or guardianship over the planet means that many Muslims believe that we should not exploit natural resources. The Quran refers to living beings as 'communities like yourselves.' Some scholars have said that this entails that other living beings have rights.

Sayings of Muhammad related to the environment:

- "If a Muslim plants a tree or sows seeds, and then a bird, or a person or an animal eats from it, it is regarded as a charitable gift for him." [Bukhari]
- The Companions [i.e. the disciples of the prophet] said, "O Messenger of God! Is there a reward for us in serving the animals?" He replied: "There is a reward for serving any living being." [Bukhari]
- "A woman entered the Fire because of a cat which she had tied, neither giving it food nor setting it free to eat from the vermin of the earth." [Bukhari]
- "The world is beautiful and verdant, and verily God, be He exalted, has made you His stewards in it, and He sees how you acquit yourselves." [Muslim]
- "Do not waste water, even if you are at a running stream." [Ibn Majah]
- "If the Hour (the day of Resurrection) is about to be established and one of you was holding a sapling, let him take advantage of even one second before the Hour is established to plant it." [Al-Albani]

Verses of the Quran linked to environmental protection:

- "He is the One Who has placed you as successors [Khalifa] on earth ... so He may test you with what He has given you."
- "O Children of Adam! ... Eat and drink, but do not waste. Surely He does not like the wasteful."
- "...do not commit abuse on the earth, spreading corruption."
- "Indeed, We offered the trust to the heavens and the earth and the mountains, but they all declined to bear it, being fearful of it. But humanity assumed it, for they are truly wrongful to themselves and ignorant of the consequences."
- "All living beings roaming the earth and winged birds soaring in the sky are communities like yourselves."

One of the primary figures of the religion and environmentalism movement, Iranian Muslim philosopher Seyyed Hossein Nasr, details the theme of "man's total disharmony with his environment." Nasr believes that to overcome the environmental crisis there needs to be a recognition that "the whole of nature is descended from higher spiritual realms." According to Nasr, the desacralization of the West has led to the increase of ideology promoting dominion over the earth and its resources, which is contrary to Islamic thinking. According to conservationist and scholar Jonathan Benthall, Islam offers a useful perspective of environmentalism through two primary themes. The first is the "glory and logic of the cosmos and of the cyclical regeneration of life" that is visible through Qur'anic passages, particularly ones referencing stewardship (khalifa). The second theme Benthall references is the very environmental basis from which Islam was founded, "an environment where natural recourses, especially water, fruit trees, and livestock have always had to be carefully conserved to ensure human survival, a concern which is inevitably reflected in the Qur'an."

Many Muslims have taken up climate activism. The Islamic Foundation for Ecology and Environmental Science is a charity organization dedicated to offering up dialogues and encouraging activism that combines both Islamic perspectives and ecological sustainability. The organization's objectives are to generate a center for Islamic research that will also serve as a location with which to gather and experiment with new sustainable technologies.

In Islam, the concept of a hima or "inviolate zone" refers to a piece of land that has been set aside to prevent cultivation or any use other than spiritual purposes. This concept, in addition to alternative interpretations of Islamic teachings, such as sufism, are found to be helpful in developing Islamic pro-environmental ethics.

=== Judaism ===
In Judaism, the natural world plays a central role in Jewish law, literature, and liturgical and other practices. Within the diverse arena of Jewish thought, beliefs vary widely about the human relation to the environment, though the rabbinic tradition has put Judaism primarily on an anthropocentric trajectory. However, a few contemporary Jewish thinkers and rabbis in the US and Israel emphasized that a central belief in Judaism is that the Man (Ha Adam – האדם whose root comes from Haadama (earth) – האדמה, in Hebrew language), should keep the Earth in the same state as he received it from God, its eternal and actual "owner" (especially for the land of Israel), thus the people today should avoid polluting it and keep it clean for the future generations. According to this opinion, Judaism is clearly in line with the principles of environmental protection and sustainable development.

In Jewish law (halakhah), ecological concerns are reflected in Biblical protection for fruit trees, rules in the Mishnah against harming the public domain, Talmudic debate over noise and smoke damages, and contemporary responsa on agricultural pollution. In Conservative Judaism, there has been some attempt to adopt ecokashrut ideas developed in the 1970s by Rabbi Zalman Schachter-Shalomi. In addition, Jewish activists have recruited principles of halakhah for environmental purposes, such as the injunction against unnecessary destruction, known as bal tashkhit.

In contemporary Jewish liturgy, ecological concerns have been promoted by adapting a kabbalistic ritual for the holiday of trees, Tu Bishvat. Biblical and rabbinic texts have been enlisted for prayers about the environment, especially in Orthodox Judaism and Jewish Renewal movements.

In the U.S., a diverse coalition of Jewish environmentalists undertakes both educational and policy advocacy on such issues as biodiversity and global warming. Jewish environmentalists are drawn from all branches of religious life, ranging from Rabbi Arthur Waskow to the Orthodox group Canfei Nesharim. In Israel, secular Jews have formed numerous governmental and non-governmental organizations to protect nature and reduce pollution.

While many Israeli environmental organizations make limited use of Jewish religious teachings, a few do approach Israel's environmental problems from a Jewish standpoint, including the Heschel Center for Environmental Learning and Leadership, named after Abraham Joshua Heschel.

=== Taoism ===
Taoism offers many ideas that are in line with environmentalism, such as wu wei, moderation, compassion and Taoist animism. Parallels were found between Taoism and deep ecology. Pioneer of environmentalism John Muir was called "the Taoist of the West". Rosenfeld wrote "Taoism is environmentalism".

=== Jainism ===
In Jainism, the ancient and perhaps timeless philosophical concepts, like Parasparopagraho Jivanam, were more recently compiled into a Jain Declaration on Nature, which describes the religion's inherent biocentrism and deep ecology.

=== Sikhism ===
In the Sikh faith, it is believed that one should treat air as one's Guru (the spiritual teacher), water as one's father and the earth as the Great Mother. (Guru Nanak Dev Ji in the Siri Guru Granth Sahib, the holy scriptures of the Sikhs Page 8 Line 10.)

More than five hundred and fifty years ago, Guru Nanak Dev Ji wrote in prayer on Page 8 Line 10 wrote, "We are all the children of air which is word of the Guru, water the Father, and earth the Great Mother who sustains us all."

== See also ==
- Animism
- Earth Day Sunday
- Ecotheology
- Environmental ethics
- Environmental racism
- Evangelical environmentalism
- Faith in Place
- Islamic environmentalism
- Judaism and environmentalism
- Religion and peacebuilding
- Resacralization of nature
- Spiritual ecology
- Stewardship (theology)
