= Earth Day Sunday =

Earth Day Sunday is a semi-religious holiday that some Christian churches in the United States celebrate on the Sunday before Earth Day (Earth Day Sunday is always on the third Sunday in April). The day is to raise awareness of the issue of the environment. Earth Day Sunday is also known as Earth Sunday.
