= Islamic Foundation for Ecology and Environmental Science =

UK-based environmental organization

The Islamic Foundation for Ecology and Environmental Science (IFEES) is an environmental organization founded in 1993 by Fazlun Khalid in Birmingham, England. The IFEES have produced a range of educational materials aimed at raising Muslims' awareness of environmental issues, and is involved in numerous conservation and education projects throughout the Muslim world, including "green audits" for mosques and a "Sustainable Living Islam summer camp. IFEES publishes a newsletter, EcoIslam, and has produced a film titled Clean Medina. The Muslim Green Guide to Reducing Climate Change was published by IFEES in 2008.

In 2005 IFEES worked with CARE International to bring a halt to dynamite fishing in Zanzibar, and are currently conducting a tree-planting campaign in Indonesia called "Green Indonesia".

== See also ==
- Religion and environmentalism
