= Richard Foltz =

Canadian scholar and historian (born 1961)

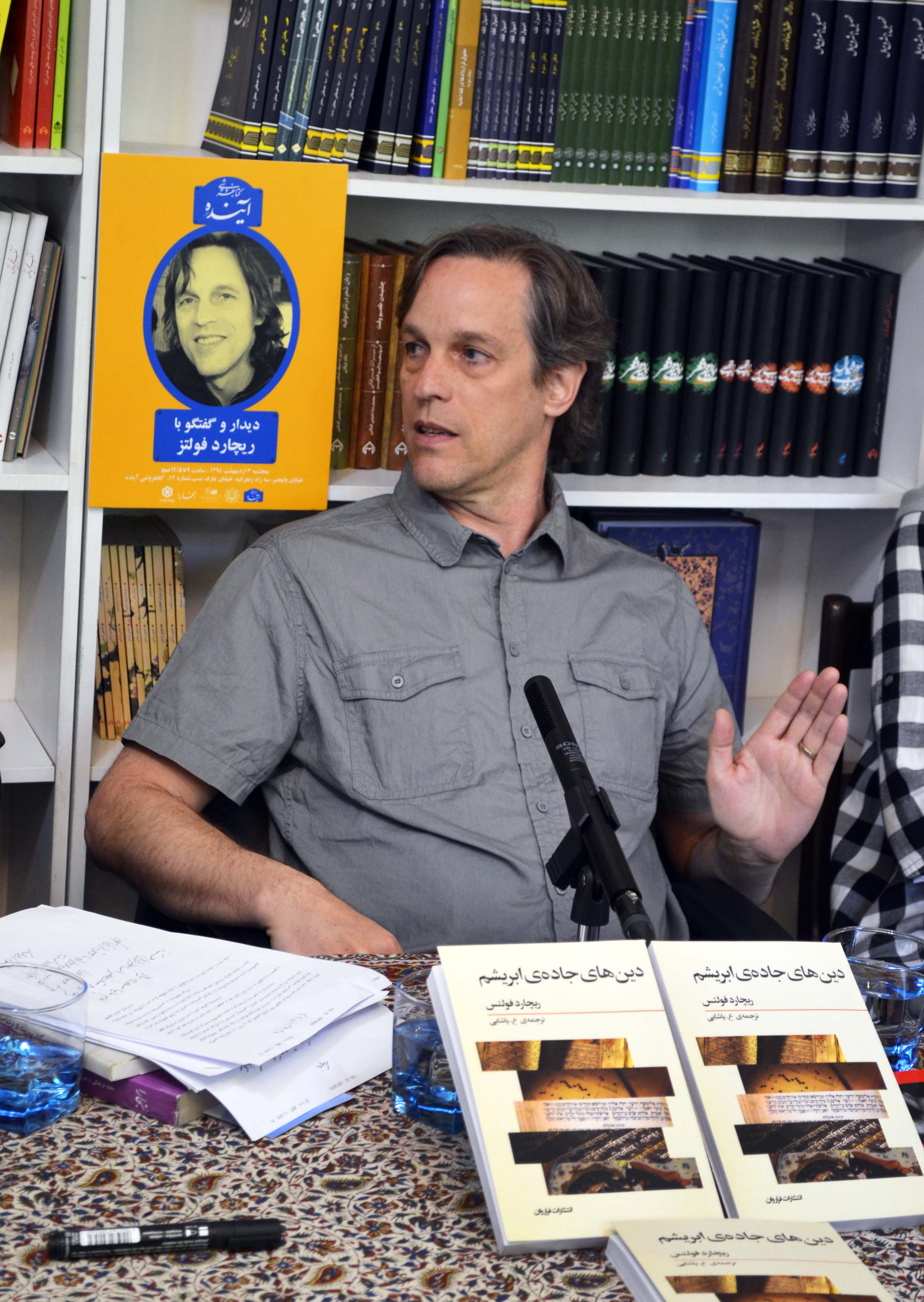
- Foltz in 2015
- Education: University of Utah; Harvard University
- Scientific career
- Fields: Iranian studies Central Asian Studies; Religion and ecology Animal rights
- Workplaces: Kuwait University; Brown University; Columbia University; University of Florida; Concordia University; Université de Sherbrooke; Australian National University

Richard Foltz is a Canadian historian who specializes in the history of Iranian civilization — sometimes referred to as "Greater Iran". He has also been active in the areas of environmental ethics and animal rights.

== Biography ==
Foltz was a full professor in the Department of Religions and Cultures at Concordia University in Montreal, Quebec until his retirement in 2026. He has been a visiting fellow in the Centre for Arab and Islamic Studies at the Australian National University and an adjunct professor at the University of Sherbrooke. He holds a Ph.D. in Middle Eastern History from Harvard University and degrees in Persian literature and applied linguistics from the University of Utah. He has taught at Kuwait University, Brown University, Columbia University, and the University of Florida. Prior to entering academia he worked for several years in Europe as a musician, film critic, and travel writer. The author of thirteen books and over one hundred scholarly articles, his work has appeared in more than a dozen languages.

== Scholarly contributions ==
Foltz has emphasized the role of Iranians in the spread of culture in world history, particularly in the domain of religions. In contrast to widespread notions associating the Silk Road with China, he sees the premodern trans-Asian trade networks as having been driven by the activities of traders who were mostly of Iranian background, principally Sogdians but also Parthians and Persians. Foltz has moreover argued that, contrary to its mostly negative portrayals in the West today, Iranian civilization continues to occupy a foundational role in the identity of many Asian peoples, analogous to the importance of Classical civilization for the West: "Most of the cultures of Asia identify with Iran on some level, much as Westerners do with Greece and Rome."

In addition to religions commonly associated with Iran such as Zoroastrianism, Manichaeism, Islam and the Baháʼí Faith, Foltz's work highlights the influence of Iranian ideas on Judaism, Buddhism and Christianity. His focus encompasses Iranian civilization in the broadest sense, ranging from the Ossetes and the Kurds in the West to the Tajiks in the East. His book A History of the Tajiks: Iranians of the East is the first monograph on the subject to be written in any Western language, as is his The Ossetes: Modern-Day Scythians of the Caucasus.

Foltz's approach is syncretic, bringing together, in the words of Omid Safi, "many different bodies of scholarship which have rarely been placed side by side". Commenting on the broad sweep of Foltz's attention to Iranian civilization, a reviewer writes in The Muslim World that "No scholar, save perhaps such giants as Ehsan Yarshater and Richard Frye, can claim a depth of knowledge of traditions as diverse and covering such a wide historical span".

Apart from his work on Iranian history and civilization, Foltz has played a formative role in the emergence of a new subfield of religious studies known as religion and ecology, having edited three seminal works in this area, including two collections devoted to Islam. While sympathetic to attempts by Hossein Nasr, Fazlun Khalid and others to derive an environmental ethic from Islamic principles, Foltz has questioned the environmental credentials of contemporary Muslim societies, citing fatalism and strongly pro-natalist attitudes as obstacles to an environmental ethic. He has also challenged claims by Zoroastrians such as Farhang Mehr that Zoroastrianism is "the world's original environmentalist religion," noting that its cosmic dualism is at odds with contemporary ecological understanding which sees all species as having a vital role to play in ecosystems. Foltz has been deeply critical of global capitalism, seconding scholars such as David Loy and Harvey Cox who argue that the dominant faith system in the world today should properly be referred to as the "Religion of the Market".

Foltz has also published ground-breaking work in the related field of religion and animal rights. He is the author of the first scholarly book on Muslim attitudes towards animals, in which he re-assesses traditional Muslim views on such topics as vegetarianism and the cleanliness of dogs. He has also written on animals in Zoroastrianism.

== Books ==
Translator

- Conversations with Emperor Jahangir, translated from the Persian by Richard Foltz, Costa Mesa: Mazda Publishers, 1998.

Author

- Mughal India and Central Asia, Karachi: Oxford University Press, 1998.
- Spirituality in the Land of the Noble: How Iran Shaped the World's Religions, Oxford: Oneworld, 2004.
- Animals in Islamic Tradition and Muslim Cultures, Oxford: Oneworld, 2006.
- Religions of the Silk Road: Premodern Patterns of Globalization, revised 2nd edition, New York: Palgrave Macmillan, 2010.
- Religions of Iran: From Prehistory to the Present, London: Oneworld, 2013.
- Iran in World History, New York: Oxford University Press, 2016.
- The Ossetes: Modern-Day Scythians of the Caucasus, London: Bloomsbury, 2021.
- A History of the Tajiks: Iranians of the East, revised 2nd edition, London: Bloomsbury, 2023.
- Improbably Persian: An Anglo-Saxon’s Forty-Year Foray into Iranology, Seattle: Amazon Publishing, 2026.

Editor

- Editor, Worldviews, Religion, and the Environment: A Global Anthology, Belmont, CA: Wadsworth Thomson, 2003.
- Lead editor (with Frederick M. Denny and Azizan Baharuddin), Islam and Ecology: A Bestowed Trust, Cambridge, MA: Harvard University Press, 2003.
- Editor, Environmentalism in the Muslim World, New York: Nova Science, 2005.
