= Environmental ethics =

Part of environmental philosophy

In environmental philosophy, environmental ethics is an established field of practical philosophy "which reconstructs the essential types of argumentation that can be made for protecting natural entities and the sustainable use of natural resources." The main competing paradigms are anthropocentrism, physiocentrism (called ecocentrism as well), and theocentrism. Environmental ethics exerts influence on a large range of disciplines including environmental law, environmental sociology, ecotheology, ecological economics, ecology and environmental geography.

There are many ethical decisions that human beings make with respect to the environment. These decision raise numerous questions. For example:

- Should humans continue to clear cut forests for the sake of human consumption?
- What species or entities ought to be considered for their own sake, independently of its contribution to biodiversity and other extrinsic goods?
- Why should humans continue to propagate its species, and life itself?
- Should humans continue to make gasoline-powered vehicles?
- What environmental obligations do humans need to keep for future generations?
- Is it right for humans to knowingly cause the extinction of a species for the convenience of humanity?
- How should humans best use and conserve the space environment to secure and expand life?
- What role can Planetary Boundaries play in reshaping the human-earth relationship?

== History ==
The academic field of environmental ethics grew up in response to the works of Rachel Carson and Murray Bookchin and events such as the first Earth Day in 1970, when environmentalists started urging philosophers to consider the philosophical aspects of environmental problems. Aldo Leopold's seminal work "A Sand Country Almanac" was republished by Ballantine Books and the Sierra Club prior to the 1970 Earth Day, this contained his essay "The Land Ethic" which explicitly claimed that the roots of the ecological crisis were philosophical (1949). Two papers published in Science had a crucial impact: Lynn White's "The Historical Roots of our Ecologic Crisis" (March 1967) and Garrett Hardin's "The Tragedy of the Commons" (December 1968). Norwegian environmentalist and philosopher Arne Næss's "Deep Ecology", coined in 1972, was extremely influential in advocating for an environmental ethic that provided all non-human entities with intrinsic value. In 1973, Australian philosopher Richard Routley (now Sylvan) presented his paper "Is There a Need for a New, an Environmental, Ethic?" at the 15th World Congress of Philosophy.

Næss's journal Inquiry was the first international journal to focus on this field. The first US-based journal was Environmental Ethics, created in 1979. The Canadian-based journal The Trumpeter: Journal of Ecosophy followed in 1983. The first British based journal of this kind, Environmental Values, was launched in 1992.

== Marshall's categories ==
Some scholars have tried to categorise the various ways the natural environment is valued. Alan Marshall and Michael Smith are two examples of this, as cited by Peter Vardy in The Puzzle of Ethics. According to Marshall, three general ethical approaches have emerged over the last 40 years: libertarian extension, ecologic extension, and conservation ethics.

=== Libertarian extension ===
Marshall's libertarian extension echoes a civil liberty approach (i.e. a commitment to extending equal rights to all members of a community). In environmentalism, the community is generally thought to consist of non-humans as well as humans.

Andrew Brennan was an advocate of ecologic humanism (eco-humanism), the argument that all ontological entities, animate and inanimate, can be given ethical worth purely on the basis that they exist. The work of Arne Næss and his collaborator Sessions also falls under the libertarian extension, although they preferred the term "deep ecology". Deep ecology is the argument for the intrinsic value or inherent worth of the environment – the view that it is valuable in itself. Their argument falls under both the libertarian extension and the ecologic extension.

Peter Singer's work can be categorized under Marshall's 'libertarian extension'. He reasoned that the "expanding circle of moral worth" should be redrawn to include the rights of non-human animals, and to not do so would be guilty of speciesism. Singer found it difficult to accept the argument from intrinsic worth of a-biotic or "non-sentient" (non-conscious) entities, and concluded in his first edition of "Practical Ethics" that they should not be included in the expanding circle of moral worth. This approach is essentially then, bio-centric. However, in a later edition of Practical Ethics after the work of Næss and Sessions, Singer admits that, although unconvinced by deep ecology, the argument from intrinsic value of non-sentient entities is plausible, but at best problematic. Singer advocated a humanist ethics.

=== Ecologic extension ===
Alan Marshall's category of ecologic extension places emphasis not on human rights but on the recognition of the fundamental interdependence of all biological (and some abiological) entities and their essential diversity. Whereas Libertarian Extension can be thought of as flowing from a political reflection of the natural world, ecologic extension is best thought of as a scientific reflection of the natural world. Ecological Extension is roughly the same classification of Smith's eco-holism, and it argues for the intrinsic value inherent in collective ecological entities like ecosystems or the global environment as a whole entity. Holmes Rolston, among others, has taken this approach.

This category might include James Lovelock's Gaia hypothesis; the theory that the planet earth alters its geo-physiological structure over time in order to ensure the continuation of an equilibrium of evolving organic and inorganic matter. The planet is characterized as a unified, holistic entity with independent ethical value, compared to which the human race is of no particular significance in the long run.

=== Conservation ethics ===
Marshall's category of 'conservation ethics' is an extension of use-value into the non-human biological world. It focuses only on the worth of the environment in terms of its utility or usefulness to humans. It contrasts the intrinsic value ideas of 'deep ecology,' hence is often referred to as 'shallow ecology,' and generally argues for the preservation of the environment on the basis that it has extrinsic value – instrumental to the welfare of human beings. Conservation is therefore a means to an end and purely concerned with mankind and inter-generational considerations. It could be argued that it is this ethic that formed the underlying arguments proposed by Governments at the Kyoto summit in 1997 and three agreements reached in the Rio Earth Summit in 1992.

== Humanist theories ==
Peter Singer advocated the preservation of "world heritage sites", unspoilt parts of the world that acquire a "scarcity value" as they diminish over time. Their preservation is a bequest for future generations as they have been inherited from human's ancestors and should be passed down to future generations so they can have the opportunity to decide whether to enjoy unspoilt countryside or an entirely urban landscape. A good example of a world heritage site would be the tropical rainforest, a very specialist ecosystem that has taken centuries to evolve. Clearing the rainforest for farmland often fails due to soil conditions, and once disturbed, can take thousands of years to regenerate.

== Applied theology ==
Interfaith march in Rome to call for climate action. Pope Francis's environmental encyclical Laudato si' has been welcomed by many environmental organisations of different faiths.

The Christian worldview sees the universe as created by God, and humankind as accountable to God for the use of the resources entrusted to humankind. Ultimate values are seen in the light of being valuable to God. This applies both in breadth of scope – caring for people (Matthew 25) and environmental issues, e.g. environmental health (Deuteronomy 22.8; 23.12-14) – and dynamic motivation, the love of Christ controlling (2 Corinthians 5.14f) and dealing with the underlying spiritual disease of sin, which shows itself in selfishness and thoughtlessness. In many countries this relationship of accountability is symbolised at harvest thanksgiving. (B.T. Adeney : Global Ethics in New Dictionary of Christian Ethics and Pastoral Theology 1995 Leicester)

Abrahamic religious scholars have used theology to motivate the public. John L. O'Sullivan, who coined the term manifest destiny, and other influential people like him used Abrahamic ideologies to encourage action. These religious scholars, columnists and politicians historically have used these ideas and continue to do so to justify the consumptive tendencies of a young America around the time of the Industrial Revolution. In order to solidify the understanding that God had intended for humankind to use the earth's natural resources, environmental writers and religious scholars alike proclaimed that humans are separate from nature, on a higher order. Those that may critique this point of view may ask the same question that John Muir asks ironically in a section of his novel A Thousand Mile Walk to the Gulf, "why are there so many dangers in the natural world in the form of poisonous plants, animals and natural disasters?" Muir's answer is that those creatures are a result of Adam and Eve's sins in the garden of Eden.

Since the turn of the 20th century, the application of theology in environmentalism diverged into two schools of thought. The first system of understanding holds religion as the basis of environmental stewardship. The second sees the use of theology as a means to rationalize the unmanaged consumption of natural resources. Lynn White and Calvin DeWitt represent each side of this dichotomy.

John Muir personified nature as an inviting place away from the loudness of urban centers. "For Muir and the growing number of Americans who shared his views, Satan's home had become God's Own Temple." The use of Abrahamic religious allusions helped Muir and the Sierra Club to create support for some of the first public nature preserves.

Authors like Terry Tempest Williams as well as John Muir build on the idea that "...God can be found wherever you are, especially outside. Family worship was not just relegated to Sunday in a chapel." References like these assist the general public to make a connection between paintings done at the Hudson River School, Ansel Adams' photographs, along with other types of media, and their religion or spirituality. Placing intrinsic value upon nature through theology is a fundamental idea of deep ecology.

== Normative ethical theories ==
Normative ethics is a field in Moral Philosophy that investigates how one ought to act. What is morally right and wrong, and how moral standards are determined. Superficially, this approach may seem intrinsically anthropocentric. However, theoretical frameworks from traditional normative ethical theories are abundant within contemporary environmental ethics.

=== Consequentialism ===
Consequentialist theories focus on the consequences of actions, this emphasizes not what is 'right', but rather what is of 'value' and 'good'. Act Utilitarianism, for example, expands this formulation to emphasize that what makes an action right is whether it maximises well-being and reduces pain. Thus, actions that result in greater well-being are considered obligatory and permissible. It has been noted that this is an 'instrumentalist' position towards the environment, and as such not fully adequate to the delicate demands of ecological diversity.Rule-utilitarianism is the view that following certain rules without exception is the surest way to bring about the best consequences. This is an important update to act-utilitarianism because agents do not need to judge about the likely consequences of each act; all they must do is determine whether or not a proposed course of action falls under a specific rule and, if it does, act as the rule specifies.

Aldo Leopold's Land Ethic (1949) tries to avoid this type of instrumentalism by proposing a more holistic approach to the relationship between humans and their 'biotic community', so to create a 'limit' based on the maxim that "a thing is right when it tends to preserve the integrity, stability, and beauty of the biotic community; it is wrong when it tends otherwise." Thus, the use of natural resources is permissible as long as it does not disrupt the stability of the ecosystem. Some philosophers have categorised Leopold's views to be within a consequentialist framework, however it is disputed whether this was intentional. Other consequentialist views such as that of Peter Singer tend to emphasise the inclusion of non-human sentient beings into ethical considerations. This view argues that all sentient creates which are by nature able to feel pleasure and pain, are of equal moral consideration for their intrinsic value. Nevertheless, non-sentient beings, such as plants, rivers and ecosystems, are considered to be merely instrumental.

In the "Handbook of the Philosophy of Climate Change," Mattia Cecchinato of the University of Oxford wrote about the current issues of consequentialist thought in the environmental field, with a significant focus on what he calls the "No Difference Problem." This is the idea that, due to the fact that a single person's choices do not impact the climate enough to have any meaningful increase or decrease of well-being, following act-utilitarianism would not lead to changing ones actions revolving the climate. There is no reason to, say, take eat a vegan burger instead of a beef burger under act-consequentialism, even though, as Cecchinato stresses, a large amount of people doing this would positively impact the environment. This is compounded even further by the idea of "indirect emissions," flying on a plane for example. The idea is that the plane is going to fly regardless of passenger x's decision to fly or not, so passenger x has no obligation under act-utilitarianism not to fly. There are a multitude of consequentialist responses to this issue, some such as Shelly Kagan argue that as there are environmental "tipping points," each little action could be the one to send us over the tipping point and massively harm the environment, so one would have a moral obligation not to do the little action. Other consequentialist responses include the idea of a "knock-on" effect, where ones individual action may not impact the environment much alone, but could cause someone else to do the same thing, and this chain goes until there is an actual major impact. There is also "virtue consequentialism," defended by philosopher Dale Jamieson, which claims that a virtuous person is also one who has cultivated the character traits which promote the most net good. Under this kind of consequentialism, one who is virtuous would care for the environment and this care for the environment would include not doing harm to it. This idea also falters under the no difference problem, as if flying doesn't cause harm to the environment directly, would it be a vicious act to fly?

=== Deontology ===
Deontological theories state that an action should be based on duties or obligations to what is right, instead of what is good. In strong contrast to consequentialism, this view argues for principles of duty based not on a function of value, but on reasons that make no substantive reference to the consequences of an action. Something of intrinsic value, then, has to be protected not because its goodness would maximise a wider good, but because it is valuable in itself; not as a means towards something, but as an end in itself. Thus, if the natural environment is categorised as intrinsically valuable, any destruction or damage to such would be considered wrong as a whole rather than merely due to a calculated loss of net value. It can be said that this approach is more holistic in principle than one of consequentialist nature, as it fits more adequately with the delicate balance of large ecosystems.

Theories of rights, for example, are generally deontological. That is, within this framework an environmental policy that gives rights to non-human sentient beings, would prioritise the conservation of such in their natural state, rather than in an artificial manner. Consider for example, issues in climate engineering; Ocean fertilisation aims to expand marine algae in order to remove higher levels of CO_{2}. A complication from this approach is that it creates salient disruptions to local ecosystems. Furthermore, an environmental ethical theory based on the rights of marine animals in those ecosystems, would create a protection against this type of intervention. Environmental deontologists such as Paul W. Taylor, for example, have argued for a Kantian approach to issues of this kind. Taylor argues that all living things are 'teleological centres of life' deserving of rights and respect. His view uses a concept of 'universalizability', to argue that one ought to act only on actions which could be rationally willed as a universal law. Val Plumwood has criticised this approach by noting that the universalisation framework, is not necessarily based on 'respect' for the other, as it's based on duty and 'becoming' part of the environment.

The preeminent deontologist in contemporary environmental ethics is Christine Korsgaard. Her 2018 book "Fellow Creatures: Our Obligations to the Other Animals" uses Kantian deontology to advocate for the idea that animals have intrinsic value. She claims that as we should be viewed as ends in ourselves, we should also view sentient animals as ends in themselves.

=== Virtue ethics ===
Virtue ethics states that some character traits should be cultivated, and others avoided. This framework avoids problems of defining what is of intrinsic value, by instead arguing that what is important is to act in accordance with the correct character trait. The Golden mean formulation, for example, states that to be 'generous' (virtue), one should neither be miserly (deficiency) or extravagant (excess). Unlike deontology and consequentialism, theories of virtue focus their formulations on how the individual has to act to live a flourishing life. This presents a 'subjective flexibility,' which seems like an adequate position to hold considering the fluctuating demands of sustainability. However, as a consequence, it can also be said that this is an inherently anthropocentric standpoint.

This anthropocentrism has been refuted by philosophers who claim to be "environmental virtue ethicists," such as Philip Cafaro. For him, it does not work simply to ascribe a human-centered virtue ethic to the environment, but instead we need to build care for the environment into our existing normative concepts.

Environmental virtue ethics has also been claimed to solve the problem of inconsequentialism, or the idea that an individuals actions very rarely has an actual impact on climate change. The common example for this is someone driving a gas-guzzling truck once a week purely to drive it around. Under a consequentialist view, the impact these rides have are negligible and as such it is not morally right or wrong. Using virtue ethics, one can say that even if this has negligible impact on the climate, we can look at the driver of this vehicle as someone who is selfish and indifferent to the emissions this ride has. We are then able to judge actions based on this framework regardless of the actual impact (or lack thereof) of the action.

Some ecofeminist theories such as that of Val Plumwood, have been categorised as a form of virtue ethics. Plumwood argues that a virtue-based ethical framework adapts more fittingly to environmental diversity, as virtues such as 'respect', 'gratitude', and 'sensitivity', are not only suitable to ecological subjectivity but also more applicable to the views of indigenous people. Furthermore, what traits would be considered as part of environmental vices? Ronald Sandler argues that detrimental dispositions to human flourishing such as 'greed', 'intemperance' and 'arrogance', lead to detrimental dispositions to the protection of the environment such as 'apathy', against other species, and 'pessimism' about conservation. Views such as this, create a mutualistic connection between virtuous human flourishing and environmental flourishing.

== Anthropocentrism ==
Anthropocentrism is the position that humans are the most important or critical element in any given situation; that the human race must always be its own primary concern. Detractors of anthropocentrism argue that the Western tradition biases homo sapiens when considering the environmental ethics of a situation and that humans evaluate their environment or other organisms in terms of the utility for them (see speciesism). Many argue that all environmental studies should include an assessment of the intrinsic value of non-human beings, which would entail a reassessment of humans ecocultural identities. In fact, based on this very assumption, a philosophical article has explored recently the possibility of humans' willing extinction as a gesture toward other beings. The authors refer to the idea as a thought experiment that should not be understood as a call for action.

Baruch Spinoza reasoned that if humans were to look at things objectively, they would discover that everything in the universe has a unique value. Likewise, it is possible that a human-centred or anthropocentric/androcentric ethic is not an accurate depiction of reality, and there is a bigger picture that humans may or may not be able to understand from a human perspective.

Peter Vardy distinguished between two types of anthropocentrism. A strong anthropocentric ethic argues that humans are at the center of reality and it is right for them to be so. Weak anthropocentrism, however, argues that reality can only be interpreted from a human point of view, thus humans have to be at the centre of reality as they see it.

Another point of view has been developed by Bryan Norton, who has become one of the essential actors of environmental ethics by launching environmental pragmatism, now one of its leading trends. Environmental pragmatism refuses to take a stance in disputes between defenders of anthropocentrist and non-anthropocentrist ethics. Instead, Norton distinguishes between strong anthropocentrism and weak-or-extended-anthropocentrism and argues that the former must underestimate the diversity of instrumental values humans may derive from the natural world.

A recent view relates anthropocentrism to the future of life. Biotic ethics are based on the human identity as part of gene/protein organic life whose effective purpose is self-propagation. This implies a human purpose to secure and propagate life. Humans are central because only they can secure life beyond the duration of the Sun, possibly for trillions of eons. Biotic ethics values life itself, as embodied in biological structures and processes. Humans are special because they can secure the future of life on cosmological scales. In particular, humans can continue sentient life that enjoys its existence, adding further motivation to propagate life. Humans can secure the future of life, and this future can give human existence a cosmic purpose.

== Status of the field ==
Only after 1990 did the field gain institutional recognition as programs such as Colorado State University, the University of Montana, Bowling Green State University, and the University of North Texas. In 1991, Schumacher College of Dartington, England, was founded and now provides an MSc in Holistic Science.

These programs began to offer a master's degree with a specialty in environmental ethics/philosophy. Beginning in 2005 the Department of Philosophy and Religion Studies at the University of North Texas offered a PhD program with a concentration in environmental ethics/philosophy.

In Germany, the University of Greifswald has recently established an international program in Landscape Ecology & Nature Conservation with a strong focus on environmental ethics. In 2009, the LMU Munich and Deutsches Museum founded the Rachel Carson Center for Environment and Society, an international, interdisciplinary center for research and education in the environmental humanities.

== Relationship with animal ethics ==
Differing conceptions of the treatment of and obligations towards animals, particularly those living in the wild, within animal ethics and environmental ethics has been a source of controversy between the two ethical positions; some ethicists have asserted that the two positions are incompatible, while others have argued that these disagreements can be overcome.

== See also ==
- Anarcho-primitivism
- Artificialization
- Biocentrism
- Bioethics
- Climate ethics
- Conservation movement
- Crop art
- Earth Economics (policy think tank)
- Ecocentrism
- Ecological economics
- EcoQuest (a series of two educational games)
- Environmental health ethics
- Environmental movement
- Environmental organization
- Environmental politics
- Environmental racism
- Environmental resource management
- Environmental skepticism
- Environmental virtue ethics
- Islamic environmentalism
- Hans Jonas
- Human ecology
- List of environmental philosophers
- Nature conservation
- Political representation of nature
- Population control
- Resource depletion
- Self-validating reduction
- Solastalgia
- Terraforming
- Trail ethics
- Van Rensselaer Potter
- Veganism
