= Peter Vardy (theologian) =

English theologian

- Born: 29 July 1945 (age 81)
- Education: University of Southampton; West Sussex Institute of Higher Education; King's College London
- Occupations: Theologian, author, conference organizer
- Organization(s): Candle Conferences Ltd; Candle Education Ltd
- Spouse(s): Anne (m. 1974; div. 2004) Charlotte (m. 2009)
- Children: 8

Peter Christian Vardy (born 29 July 1945) is a British theologian and author. He was vice-principal of Heythrop College, a Jesuit college in London, from 1999 to 2011, and is the author or co-author of 18 books about religion and ethics, He is known for the religious-studies conferences he runs in the UK for schools.

== Early life and education ==
Vardy was born on 29 July 1945 to Mark Vardy and Christa Lund Vardy; his mother was Danish. He was educated at Charterhouse School, a private school in Godalming, Surrey.

Vardy trained as a chartered accountant, becoming a fellow of the Institute of Chartered Accountants (FCA) in 1967. He ran management-training sessions for the National Westminster Bank and Swiss Bank Corporation, and was the chairman of H. Young Holdings plc from 1979 to 1983.

At the age of 30, Vardy began to study theology, receiving a Bachelor of Arts (BA) degree from the University of Southampton in 1979 and a Postgraduate Certificate in Education (PGCE) (a teaching qualification) from the West Sussex Institute of Higher Education in 1980. He undertook postgraduate studies at King's College London and was awarded a Master of Theology (ThM) degree in 1982. He remained at King's to undertake a Doctor of Philosophy (PhD) degree in the philosophy of religion which he completed in 1984 or 1985 with a doctoral thesis entitled The concept of eternity.

== Academic career ==
Vardy taught philosophy of religion at King's College London and the Institute of Education. He began lecturing at Heythrop College in 1986 and in 1999 became the vice-principal, a position he held until his retirement in 2011.

Whilst at Heythrop, he served on the University of London's Board of Theology (1990–1993). Vardy served as President of the London Society for the Study of Religion from 1996 to 1998 and remained a member until at least 2007 when the Society celebrated its centenary.

Vardy's primary academic interest is in the philosophy of Søren Kierkegaard, whose work he taught at Heythrop for 25 years. From 1987 he organized annual dinners in London on the anniversary of Kierkegaard's death, and in 1996 his book Kierkegaard was published, later published as The SPCK Introduction to Kierkegaard.

He was awarded an Honorary Doctorate of Theology from the University of Chichester in 2020.

== Work with schools ==
=== Conferences ===
Vardy served as chair of the governors of Shebbear College, a Methodist school in Devon. He has also worked as a member of the Methodist Schools Committee, and has been a keynote speaker at conferences in the field of education, including for UNESCO and UNHRC. While at Heythrop, Vardy served as an editorial adviser for Dialogue, a journal of religion and philosophy aimed at sixth-form students, and made a series of teaching videos through Dialogue Education. He began running day conferences for sixth-form students in the mid-1990s and set up Wombat Education Ltd in 1998. In 2002 he and Julie Arliss of Richard Huish College, Taunton, organized a conference there and several others around the UK. In 2009 Vardy and his second wife, Charlotte Vardy, set up Candle Conferences Ltd, and in 2012 Candle Education Ltd, through which they run day conferences for schools.

Since 2010 Vardy has campaigned against the introduction of the English Baccalaureate, which he argues has led to a decline in numbers taking religious studies. He views philosophy of religion as an exercise in exploring the terms left undefined by theology (such as "God" and "soul") and encouraging humility. Education is a way to help young people become fully human, in his view, or good in the Aristotelian sense. He described the approach in his books "What is Truth?" (2001) and "Being Human" (2003), and in a paper, "Becoming Fully Human", for Dialogue Australasia in 2007.

Vardy was awarded an Honorary Doctorate in Theology by the University of Chichester in October 2021, in recognition of his work in promoting the study of Religious Studies, Philosophy and Ethics and Values Education.

=== Dialogue Australasia Network ===
In 1999 Vardy worked as a consultant for an Australian school, Geelong Grammar School, in Geelong, Victoria. Later he helped to set up the Dialogue Australasia Network, promoting the "five strands" approach to religious studies in schools that he proposed at the inaugural conference of Dialogue Australasia Network in 1997. This was implemented in a number of Australasian Independent Schools. He also served as an editor and occasional author for the journal Dialogue Australasia.

== Media ==
Vardy has served as an editorial adviser for BBC and Channel 4 documentaries, has been interviewed by ABC Radio in Australia, and has written for several publications, including Times Higher Education, Eureka Street, and The Age. Vardy's Introduction to Kierkegaard was recommended in 2003 by the BBC Radio 4 Open Book's Reading Clinic.

== Personal life ==
In 1974, Vardy married his first wife, Anne Moore; the couple had two sons and three daughters before divorcing in 2004. In 2009, he married Charlotte Fowler (born 1978), and together they have two daughters.

== Selected works ==
Books

- (1987). God of Our Fathers? Do We Know What We Believe? London: Darton, Longman and Todd.
- (1988). And if it's True? London: Marshall Pickering.
- (1989). Business Morality, People and Profit. London: Marshall Pickering.
- (1990). The Puzzle of God. London: M. E. Sharpe.
- (1992). The Puzzle of Evil. London: M. E. Sharpe.
- (1994, with Paul Grosch). The Puzzle of Ethics. London: Fount Paperbacks.
- (1995, with Mary Mills). The Puzzle of the Gospels. London: M. E. Sharpe.
- (1996). Kierkegaard (later The SPCK Introduction to Kierkegaard). London: Fount Paperbacks.
- (1997). The Puzzle of Sex. London: M. E. Sharpe.
- (1999). What is Truth? Sydney: University of New South Wales Press.
- (2003, with Julie Arliss). The Thinker's Guide to God. Alresford: John Hunt Publishing, Ltd.
- (2003, with Julie Arliss). The Thinker's Guide to Evil. Alresford: John Hunt Publishing, Ltd.
- (2003). Being Human. London: Darton, Longman & Todd Ltd.
- (2010). Good & Bad Religion. London: SCM Press.
- (2012, with Charlotte Vardy). Ethics Matters. London: SCM Press.
- (2013, with Charlotte Vardy). God Matters. London: SCM Press.
- (2016, with Charlotte Vardy). Bible Matters. London: SCM Press.
- (2016). The Puzzle of Christianity. London: William Collins.
- (2020). "Beyond the Cave: A philosopher's quest for Truth". London: Iff Books.

Articles and chapters

- (1987). "Review of Kierkegaard's Dialect of Inwardness by Stephen N. Dunning", in Religious Studies. 23 (3):427–428.
- (1993). "Technology in the Age of Automata", in Graduate Faculty Philosophy Journal. 16(1): 209–226.
- (1995). "A Christian Approach to Eternal Life", in D. Cohn-Sherbok and C. Lewis (eds.). Beyond Death. London: Palgrave Macmillan.
- (1997). "Theology and Sharing the Economic Cake", in P. Askonas and S. F. Frowen (eds.). Welfare and Values. London: Palgrave Macmillan.
- (2002). "Is Religious Education and ethical and moral debate a contradiction?", in Lynne Broadbent and Alan Brown (eds.). Issues in Religious Education. London: RoutledgeFalmer.
- (2005). "The Philosophy of Religion", in John R. Hinnells (ed). The Routledge Companion to the Study of Religion. London: Routledge.
- (2014). "Theologians should face Peter Singer's challenge". Eureka Street. 24(14), July 2014.
