= Mustafa Abu Sway =

Palestinian Islamic scholar

Mustafa Abu Sway (born 1958) is a Palestinian Islamic scholar and the first holder of the Integral Chair for the Study of Al Ghazali's Work at al-Masjid al-Aqsa and al-Quds University in Jerusalem.

== Life ==
Mustafa Abu Sway was born in Amman in 1958. He received his education at Bethlehem University and Boston College in the United States. Abu Sway taught at the International Islamic University in Malaysia and was a visiting Fulbright scholar-in-residence at Wilkes Honors College of Florida Atlantic University. He has served as a visiting professor of Islamic Studies at Bard College in New York and as an associate professor of Philosophy and Islamic studies and Director of the Islamic Research Center at al-Quds University. A Senior Fellow of the Royal Aal al-Bayt Institute for Islamic Thought, Mustafa Abu Sway was listed among the 500 most influential Muslims in the world in 2012 and 2020.

== Works ==
- Islamic Epistemology: The Case of Al-Ghazali (Kuala Lumpur, 1995)
- Fatawa Al-Ghazali (ISTAC, 1996)
- Abraham in the Three Monotheistic Faiths (Jerusalem, 1998)
- Kitab Al-Tarbiyah Al-Islamiyyah (2001)
