= Environmental health ethics =

Study of ethics relating to environmental health

Environmental health ethics is a field of study that combines environmental health policies and ethical considerations towards a mutually acceptable goal. Given the myriad of environmental issues facing society today a sound ethical background can be applied in an attempt to reach a compromise between conflicting interests, like anthropocentrism, global stewardship, religious values, economic development, and public health. A small sample of the scientific disciplines involved in environmental health ethics include: ecology, toxicology, epidemiology, and exposure biology.

== Environmental health topics ==
Environmental health embodies a wide range of topics with which there are many ethical issues. Many of these issues can be traced back to a moral obligation towards to life forms and other units of biological organization, like ecosystems, and the nature of that obligation. Humanity's place within any given ecosystem must be weighed against the importance of regional, and global health of the environment as a whole. Human and animal rights, property use, and other freedoms can be combined with other factors like to form an ethical dilemma social justice, equality, sustainability, and globalism to form ethical dilemmas. In response to difficulties with using moral theories to resolve ethical dilemmas various approaches can be used. A case-by-case approach may be too slow when considering the volume of issues at present, so an alternative may be better suited to the task. Taking into account commonly accepted moral virtues can guide conduct and address conflicts between values, rules, and obligations. Most, if not all, of these generally held principles can be found in the ethical approaches listed above, an example of which may be 'respect human rights'. This Principle-Based Method for ethical decision making can be viewed below.

1. State the question or problem.
2. Gather the relevant information.
3. Explore different opinions.
4. Apply ethical principles to the different options.
5. Resolve any conflicts among ethical principles.
6. Take action.

After settling on a methodology for analyzing different ethical situations we can turn to a broad survey of some of the most relevant issues which face humanity today.

== Pest control ==
Pesticides are used throughout the world in an attempt to control, repel, or kill pest species. Though many species of insect can be commonly identified throughout the world, others may harm human health and well-being while providing a benefit to the overall environment of an area. One example of the phenomenon is a bee's ability to sting an individual who may have a serious allergic reaction, though they also play a crucial role in the pollination of an ecosystem. A further example would be various species of bat, which though they can transmit rabies, also help to control mosquito populations.

Perhaps the biggest event in the history of pesticide use is the widespread use of DDT to control various pests, including mosquitoes and lice. Its long-term effects had not been sufficiently documented and thus it was assumed to be of low toxicity. Over time the widespread use of DDT began to have serious environmental and human health consequences. Organisms further up the food chain showed significant amounts of DDT in their tissues and this presence had adverse health effects, for example, the weakening of predatory bird eggshells and fish kills. Adverse effects among humans included endocrine system disruption which can lead to reproductive complications.

Among the most disruptive pesticides are those dubbed Persistent organic pollutants (POPs) which do not break down easily in the environment, or if they do they become something equally harmful. Because POPs represent such a threat to organisms within an environment, especially those higher on a food chain, specific international legislation referred to as the Stockholm Convention banned several of them being used. Some of these pollutants are DDT, aldrin, chlordane, dieldrin, endrin, heptachlor, hexachlorobenzene, and toxaphene.

With these considerations in place it falls onto lawmakers to regulate responsible use of pesticides, and ethics can provide a starting point to consider the best option. Extensive use of pesticides would improve life in the short-term but be harmful in the long-term, and completely banning their use would likewise be detrimental to overall environmental and human health. One strategy to encourage is called Integrated Pest Management (IPM), in which pesticides are responsibly used to limit agricultural loss but also watched for growing resistance and environmental toxicity. The Center for Disease Control (CDC) have also taken measured to educate clinicians and the public about relevant issues and the best ways to manage pesticide use.

== Genetic engineering, food, and nutrition ==
Genetic engineering concerns the application of scientific alteration of plant and animal DNA in order to combat pests, disease, drought, and other factors which can adversely harm the organism. Objections to genetically modified organisms (GMOs) include theological (playing God) and economic (GMOs can be costly) viewpoints. Genetic engineering of both plants and animals must pass through FDA legislation, which may include public labeling of the product or otherwise marking it as genetically modified.

Food and nutrition also fall under the category of things regulated by the FDA, however, the ethics of this regulation are not always clear. Health consequences of unsafe food, eating in overlarge quantities, are well documented yet in all societies there is no legislation against over-consumption. Ethical properties of utilitarianism and social justice conflict with humanity's freedom of choice in the determining of access to healthy, safe food.

== Pollution and waste ==
Air, water, and solid waste pollution are environmental health issues which can adversely affect people, plants, and animals. From an ethical standpoint many things about pollutants can be studied, like questions of disposal, storage, recycling, and responsibility. A few examples of air pollutants include particulate matter, sulfur dioxide, nitrogen oxides, carbon oxides, chlorofluorocarbons, and heavy metals (e.g. mercury). Perhaps the largest ethical debate concerning air pollution is how to balance economic development against the interests of the public health, safety, and cleanliness. With both sides offering benefits and drawbacks it can be difficult to establish an acceptable compromise. Legislation enacted to prevent widespread use of chlorofluorocarbons, which cause significant environmental damage, can be seen as one instance of economic development taking a lower priority to public health.

Water pollution is another type of widespread contaminant which has ethical implications in mitigating the source and balancing conflicting priorities. The two types of water contaminants are anthropogenic compounds (generally referred to as pollutants, such as disinfection products, metals, municipal and agricultural waste, and petroleum and coal hydrocarbons) and natural contaminants (such as microorganisms or chemicals like arsenic and nitrogen, which are naturally present in the soil). the common misconception is that chemicals leaking into the soil will be diluted over time and rendered harmless. This theory does not take into account persistent organic pollutants, which do not break down easily, and sometimes break down into more harmful constituents. Most industrialized nations have legislation in place to protect the public from impure drinking water. The Safe Drinking Water Act of 1974 established maximum levels of pollutants in public drinking water, however its power to regulate private sources of bottled water or wells is severely limited. An additional issue regarding water pollution is the relative scarcity of clean fresh water on the earth, an issue which acutely presents itself in areas prone to drought. Agriculture uses a great deal of water, so much so that shortages in drought-prone areas can significantly affect crop yield. The main ethical issues with water pollution is whether growth should be restricted in order to preserve public health. An additional issue is the regulation of private corporations, whose activities may put populations of citizens at risk for groundwater contamination.

Solid waste pollution includes pollutants like agricultural waste, construction waste, electronic waste, hazardous waste, medical, and mining waste. The two prevailing strategies for solid waste management are prevention and treatment/disposal. Waste prevention is the preferable, both economically and environmentally, as it does not necessitate costly removal and storage. Many of the same ethical issues related above manifest themselves with the handling and storage of solid waste, as well as an additional social justice issue of exactly where the storage area for solid waste should be located.

== Chemical regulation ==
Chemical regulation, including carbon particles and nanotubes and nanotechnology, are very new technologies whose long-term effects have not been satisfactorily studied. This lack of research argues that cautionary use of these products is warranted, especially when short-term effects include harmful symptoms. In opposition to this caution is the nanotechnology industry which is growing very rapidly and may be able to alleviate many of the problems facing society today, like selective cancer treatment and the energy crisis. Perhaps the largest obstacle to testing occurs with the sheer diversity of nanoparticles, of which the only unifying factor is their minuscule size.
