= Sepehr Salimi =

Iranian blogger and freelance journalist (born 1981)

سپهر سلیمی Sepehr Salimi
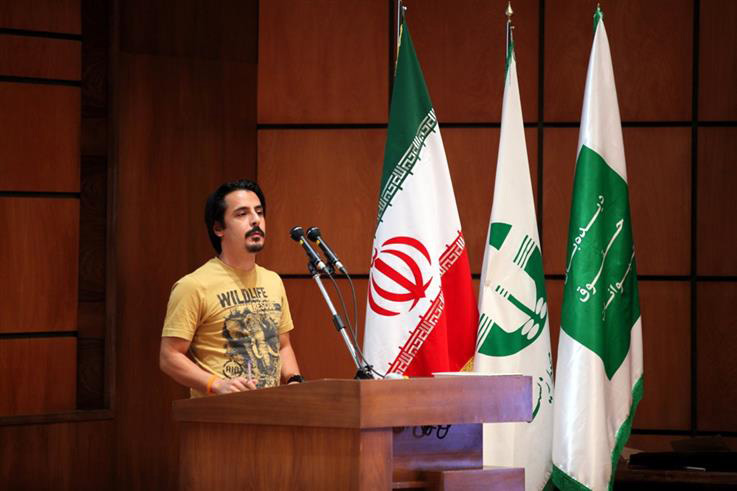
- Born: 1981 (age 44–45); Masjed Soleyman, Iran
- Occupations: blogger, environmental activist

Sepehr Salimi (born 10 March 1981) is an Iranian blogger, freelance journalist and advocate of animal welfare and environmentalism. He is best known as the originator of “Green Wave” blogging in Iran.

== Executive experiences ==
=== Environmental and animal welfare activities ===
Salimi joined Isfahan Society of the Prevention of Cruelty to Animal (Isf-SPCA) on 2001 and since 2003 he has been the director of the association. He continued his regional activities by joining the board of directors of Isfahan Network of Environmental NGOs. He was also voluntary member of India WWF and Green Peace during the years of 2012 to 2015. He is among the founders of the Earth for All NGO since 2014.

=== Journalism Experience ===
Being in policy-making board and president of the environment section of Healthy Life, an Iranian cultural magazine, is among his experience in journalism.

== Achievements ==
Salimi owns the oldest active environmental weblogs since 2003. This blog contributes greatly in producing content in the areas of environmental issues and animal rights for Persian readers. In recognition of his efforts in this field, PersianBlog (the first blog service provider in Persian language) awarded him the best environmental bloggers’ prize in 2008. Being as the second journalist in Young Journalists Conference in 2007 is another achievement of him in the journalism field. He has also attained the first and third title in Young Journalist Festival in different areas of journalism.
