= Mawil Izzi Dien =

Islamic scholar and ecotheologian

Mawil Y. Izzi Dien is an Iraqi Islamic scholar and eminent Islamic ecotheologian. He is a professor of Islamic Studies at the University of Wales Trinity Saint David and a visiting professor of Islamic Studies at Qatar University.

== Biography ==
Mawil Izzi Dien was born in Baghdad. He studied Islamic law in Baghdad and at Manchester Universities. In 1983, when he was at the Faculty of Law at King Abdul Aziz University in Jeddah, Saudi Arabia, Izzi Dien helped prepare the first contemporary declaration on conservation from an Islamic point of view. It was later published by the International Union for the Conservation of Nature in English, French, and Arabic. Izzi Dien served as an adviser to the Saudi government. During the 1980s, he helped construct the legal and philosophical framework for Meteorology and Environmental Protection Administration in Saudi Arabia.

As a consequence of being reproduced in various anthologies in the 1990s, Izzi Dien's 1990 article, "Islamic Environmental Ethics, Law and Society," came to be considered as reflecting the normative Islamic stance by many Western environmentalists. Izzi Dien stresses on the moral responsibilities that Islam places on humans in this article, concentrating on the key elements of Islam's classical legal tradition and their sources in the Qur'an and hadith that refer to the preservation and protection of natural resources. The article later received a book length treatment and was published in 2000 as Environmental Dimensions of Islam.

== Works ==
- The Theory and the Practice of Market Law in Medieval Islam: A Study of Kitāb Niṣāb Al-Iḥtisāb of ʻUmar B. Muḥammad Al-Sunāmī (1998)
- Environmental Dimensions of Islam (2000)
- Islamic Law: From Historical Foundations to Contemporary Practice (2004)
- Islamic Theology in the Contemporary World: An Introduction (2014)

== See also ==
- Seyyed Hossein Nasr
- İbrahim Özdemir
