= Knowledge and the Sacred =

1981 book by Seyyed Hossein Nasr

- Author: Seyyed Hossein Nasr
- Language: English
- Subject: Perennial philosophy, Sufism
- Publisher: Edinburgh University Press
- Publication date: 1981
- Media type: Print
- Pages: 341

Knowledge and the Sacred is a 1981 book by the Iranian philosopher Seyyed Hossein Nasr. It was originally presented as his Gifford Lectures, which he delivered in 1981. The book is an exposition of perennial philosophy and has been described as a summa of the traditional perspective. It reflects Nasr's desire to revive what he refers to as the sacred quality of knowledge as opposed to knowledge based on sense perception and reason.

== History ==
Nasr was the first Muslim and the first non-Westerner to deliver the Gifford Lectures. He received his invitation to deliver the lectures immediately before the Iranian revolution of 1979. However, Nasr was forced into exile as a result of the revolution, and he lost both his prepared lecture notes and his library. He first feared he would have to cancel the event, but he chose to honor his commitment and in four months produced the substance of his lectures. Nasr eventually delivered the lectures at the University of Edinburgh in 1981, which were published by Edinburgh University Press the same year as Knowledge and the Sacred.

== Content ==
The book opens with a chapter on what Nasr refers to as the desacralization of knowledge, arguing that knowledge has become cut off from its divine source—God—and that there is a need for its resacralization. The next chapter deals with the idea of Tradition from the viewpoint of perennial philosophy, defining it as "truths or principles of a divine origin, revealed or unveiled to mankind... through various figures envisaged as messengers, prophets, avataras, the Logos, or other transmitting agencies, along with all the ramifications and applications of these principles in different realms, including law and social structure, art, symbolism, the sciences, and embracing of course Supreme Knowledge along with the means of its attainment." The third chapter of the book concentrates on the West's rediscovery of the sacred and revival of tradition. In the following chapter, Nasr develops his notion of scientia sacra, defining it as “that sacred knowledge which lies at the heart of every revelation”. Scientia sacra or sacred science draws on two very distinct sources, revelation and intellection, in contrast to the sciences based on sense perception and reason. Nasr shifts his focus in the fifth chapter to what he refers to as the pontifical and Promethean man, positing two opposing conceptions of man. Pontifical man, for Nasr, is a divine representative who acts as a link between heaven and earth. Promethean man, on the other hand, represents an earthly being who has forgotten his divine purpose.

In the chapter titled The Cosmos as Theophany, Nasr describes the cosmos as "a manifestation of the Ultimate Reality", and “a theatre in which are reflected the Divine Names and Qualities”, saying that the cosmos is “a crypt through which man must journey to reach the Reality beyond cosmic manifestation”. He says that modern science embraces the idea of a "single level of reality" and calls for the restoration of traditional cosmology, which maintains a hierarchy of levels of existence and provides "spiritual maps" that "relate as much to man's inner being as they do to his outside world". Nasr turns to concepts of time and eternity in the seventh chapter, offering various perspectives on the relationship between time and eternity. In chapter eight, Nasr discusses traditional art, describing it as "a source of both knowledge and grace". Traditional art, in Nasr's words, “forges and forms an ambiance in which its truths are reflected everywhere, in which men breathe and live in a universe of meaning in conformity with the reality of the tradition in question”. Chapter Nine of the book offers a comparative study of different religious traditions. In the final chapter of the book, Knowledge of the Sacred as Deliverance, Nasr places his emphasis on "realized knowledge" as opposed to theoretical knowledge. According to Nasr, realized knowledge "concerns not only the intelligence but also the will and the whole psyche", and its attainment “requires the acquisition of spiritual virtues, which is the manner in which man participates in that truth which is itself suprahuman”.

== Themes ==
According to Nicholas Heer, the main argument Nasr makes in these lectures, which he explores in great length, is that while sciences based on sense perception and reason may be utilized to learn about physical reality, knowledge of the ultimate reality or God can only be obtained through what he refers to as scientia sacra or sacred knowledge. For Gai Eaton, Knowledge and the Sacred can be "described as a Summa of the “traditional” perspective as it relates to the modern “desacralization” of knowledge, the rediscovery of the Sacred, Scientia sacra, man as khalifatullāh contrasted with man as usurper, the cosmos regarded as a theophany, eternity and the temporal order, traditional art, the “multiplicity of sacred forms” and, finally, knowledge of the Sacred as the path to “deliverance”."

== Reception ==
According to the Dictionary of Literary Biography, Nasr's Gifford Lectures "signalled one of the first recognitions of traditional philosophy by mainstream academia". In the volume of the Library of Living Philosophers devoted to Nasr's life and thought, Wolfgang Smith writes: "For the first time in modern history, I would venture to say, the undistorted and unadulterated voice of the perennial and universal tradition could be heard within the prestigious halls of academe." Other academics, the Dictionary of Literary Biography notes, have not always responded favourably to that voice. The book drew criticism from advocates of rationalism and empiricism. According to Ioan Petru Culianu, the thesis it relies on "cannot be validated (or falsified) in any way," adding that it is "meant for a pious public already convinced of the truth and importance of Nasr's message" and that "it remains a conviction only for those of us who are not spoiled by “rationalism and empiricism” to such an extent as to need some form of demonstration." Thomas Dean states in a review of the book that traditionalism, upon which its thesis is built, presents a "methodological impasse." The criticism of its thesis, in Dean's opinion, may be dismissed as "that modern rebellion against tradition". Because, according to Nasr, individuals who lack intellectual intuition are unable to evaluate the merit of such work. The same criticism is made by Mehdi Aminrazavi, who argues, referring to Nasr's critics, that his thesis is "non-verifiable" in that it presents "esoteric truth claims", adding that the system it relies upon is "self-referential" because "its truth value depend[s] upon the system itself". For this, Aminrazavi claims that Nasr's "opponents" believe it is difficult to have a meaningful philosophical dialogue with Nasr.

The work, on the other hand, was highly praised by those who favor spiritual knowledge. Nicholas Heer, for example, writes: "[R]eaders, imbued with modern values and modern points of view, may find in these lectures doctrines which may to them appear novel, strange, and even bizarre and outlandish, worthy only of outright rejection. Regardless of what one’s reaction to these lectures may be, they constitute without question a learned and eloquent vindication and apology for a point of view that has long been in disfavor." Adnan Aslan echoed the same view, saying that "This magnum opus when properly understood and assimilated, is indeed able to evoke an intellectual transformation. It means more than it says directly: it is written in a fashion which communicates not only the domain of reason but also of ‘spirit’. Hence it is not surprising to see that those who are not accustomed to communicate at such a level often fail to grasp the message of the book." Huston Smith, an influential scholar of religious studies, writes:

As for the book at hand, if its author is a phenomenon, this latest book is an event... The 1981 Gifford Lectures are unique in this series in being the first to be delivered by an Oriental. If we are looking for clear signs of a new day, one in which the West is seriously trying to globalize its outlook, here is one that can be pinpointed. Looking back on Knowledge and the Sacred, intellectual historians may one day rank it with William of Moerbeke's Latin translations of Aristotle in the thirteenth century, Marsiglio Ficino's of Plato in the fifteenth, or D.T. Suzuki's 1927 Essays in Zen Buddhism as a landmark showing that a new stage in cross-cultural understanding has been achieved.

— Huston Smith, Review of Knowledge and the Sacred, 1984

Gai Eaton, in a similar vein, writes:

Seyyed Hossein Nasr has presented, eloquently and against a background of great erudition, the stark contrast between, on the one hand, the traditional view of the nature of things and of man’s destiny and, on the other, the secular fragmented ideologies current in our time. In doing so he has offered his readers a plain choice between two entirely different paths leading to entirely different goals. Even those who have no hesitation in supposing that everything that was believed or thought until recent times is now obsolete will nonetheless be obliged to hesitate and to consider whether there may not be a genuine and viable alternative to the cul-de-sac in which modern man finds himself imprisoned. To be aware of this alternative is to be aware of hope and to discover, beyond the narrow alleyways, an open landscape which invites our entry.

— Gai Eaton, Knowledge and the Sacred: Reflections on Seyyed Hossein Nasr’s Gifford Lectures , 1983

Victor Danner writes in a review of the book that "It is a work with magnificent sweep both in a philosophical and historical sense, revealing a universality of thought that only a handful of contemporary thinkers of the East or the West have mastered". According to Gerald Largo, Nasr "has contributed an indispensable unified effort to retrieve the sapiential perspective which he articulates so brilliantly and clearly. The copious footnotes and the index invite us to study this book and to rethink the landscape of religious studies from the perspective of the sapiential view which lies at its heart."

== See also ==
- The Need for a Sacred Science
- Religion and the Order of the Nature

== Sources ==
- Allen, Micheal (2003). "Seyyed Hossein Nasr". In Dematteis, Philip B.; McHenry, Leemon B. (eds.). Dictionary of Literary Biography. Gale. ISBN 978-0787660239.
- Aslan, Adnan (1998). "The Need for a Pluralistic Approach in Religion". Religious Pluralism in Christian and Islamic Philosophy: The Thought of John Hick and Seyyed Hossein Nasr. Routledge. ISBN 978-0700710256.
- Raschid, Muhammad Salman (1983). "Philosophia perennis universale imperium". Religion. 13 (2). Informa UK Limited: 155–171. doi:10.1016/0048-721x(83)90036-2. ISSN 0048-721X.
- Smith, Huston (1984). "Knowledge and the Sacred". Philosophy East and West. 34 (1). JSTOR. doi:10.2307/1398496. ISSN 0031-8221. JSTOR 1398496.
- Dean, Thomas (1984). "Primordial Tradition or Postmodern Hermeneutics? A Review Essay on "Transcendence and the Sacred" and "Knowledge and the Sacred, the Gifford Lectures, 1981"". Philosophy East and West. 34 (2). JSTOR: 211–226. doi:10.2307/1398920. ISSN 0031-8221. JSTOR 1398920.
- Culianu, Ioan P. (1992). "Knowledge and the Sacred. Seyyed Hossein Nasr". The Journal of Religion. 72 (2). University of Chicago Press: 284. doi:10.1086/488876. ISSN 0022-4189.
- Eaton, Gai (1983). "Knowledge and the Sacred: Reflections on Seyyed Hossein Nasr's Gifford Lectures". Studies in Comparative Religion. 15 (3–4). Archived from the original on 2020-10-26.
- Largo, Gerald A. (1982). "Review: Islamic Knowledge; Review of Knowledge and the Sacred by Seyyed Hossein Nasr". CrossCurrents. 32 (2): 219–221. JSTOR 24458501.
- Heer, Nicholas (1993). "Book Reviews: Knowledge and the Sacred". Philosophy East and West. 43 (1): 144–150. doi:10.2307/1399476. JSTOR 1399476.
- Danner, Victor (1982). "Book Reviews: Knowledge and the Sacred". The Muslim World. 72 (3–4): 247–248.
- Nasr, Seyyed Hossein (2000). "Intellectual Autobiography". In Hahn, Lewis Edwin; Auxier, Randall E.; Stone Jr., Lucian W. (eds.). The Philosophy of Seyyed Hossein Nasr. Open Court. ISBN 978-0812694147.
