= The Heart of Islam =

2002 book by Seyyed Hossein Nasr

The Heart of Islam: Enduring Values for Humanity is a 2002 book by the Iranian philosopher Seyyed Hossein Nasr.

== See also ==
- Ideals and Realities of Islam
- Traditional Islam In The Modern World
- The Garden Of Truth

== Sources ==
- SPEEDIE, DAVID C. (2005). "The Heart of Islam: Enduring Values for Humanity". International Journal of Middle East Studies. 37 (4). Cambridge University Press (CUP): 613–614. doi:10.1017/s0020743805212229. ISSN 0020-7438.
- Heinegg, Peter (2003). "The Very Model of a Modern Muslim Eulogist". CrossCurrents. 52 (4). Wiley: 569–571. JSTOR 24460647.
