= Maria Massi Dakake =

American scholar of Islamic studies

- Occupation: Islamic studies scholar

Academic background
- Education: Cornell University; Princeton University

Academic work
- Discipline: Islamic studies
- Institutions: George Mason University

Maria Massi Dakake (/ˈdeɪˌkeɪk/ DAY-kayk) is an American scholar of Islamic studies and associate professor of Religious Studies at George Mason University. Her research mainly focuses on Islamic intellectual history, Quranic studies, Shi`ite and Sufi traditions, and women's spirituality and religious experience. She was a contributor to The Study Quran - a modern verse-by-verse commentary of the Quran.

== Biography ==
Dakake graduated with a B.A in government from Cornell University in 1990 and completed her MA and PhD in Near Eastern Studies from Princeton University in 1998 and 2000 respectively. She is the director of Graduate program at George Mason University and a founding member and former interim director (2015–2016) of the Ali Vural Ak Center for Global Islamic Studies. She has been at George Mason University since 2000 and has served as the chair of the Department of Religious Studies. Before joining George Mason University, Dakake taught at the College of New Jersey as an adjunct professor and Princeton University as a preceptor.

== Personal life ==
She is a convert to Islam from a Christian background.

== Works ==
- The Charismatic Community: Shi'ite Identity in Early Islam (SUNY Press, 2008)
- The Study Quran: A New Translation and Commentary (Translator, commentary writer and general editor) with Seyyed Hossein Nasr (editor-in-chief), Caner Dagli, Joseph E. B. Lumbard and Mohammed Rustom. HarperOne, 2015.
- The Routledge Companion to the Qur'an edited by George Archer, Maria M. Dakake, and Daniel A. Madigan. Routledge, 2021.
- The Life and Legacy of Muhammad. The Great Courses with Audible, 2022.

== See also ==
- Nusrat Amin
- Celene Ibrahim
- Leyla Ozgur Alhassen
- Ruqayya Yasmine Khan
