= Joseph E. B. Lumbard =

American Islamic studies scholar

- Born: Joseph E. B. Lumbard; 1969 (age 56–57)

Academic background
- Education: George Washington University, Yale University
- Influences: Seyyed Hossein Nasr

Academic work
- Institutions: Hamad Bin Khalifa University
- Notable works: The Study Quran; Aḥmad al-Ghazālī, Remembrance and the Metaphysics of Love

Joseph E. B. Lumbard (born 1969) is an American Muslim scholar of Islamic studies, and associate professor of Quranic studies at the College of Islamic Studies at Hamad Bin Khalifa University in Qatar. He is the author, editor, and translator of several scholarly books and many articles on Islamic philosophy, Sufism, and Quranic studies.

== Biography ==
Born and raised in Washington D.C., Lumbard was brought up within the Episcopal Church, serving as an altar boy. In his teenage years he lost interest and he was introduced to Islam when a sophomore at George Washington University. He converted to Islam a year and a half later.

I realized that everything that I had been searching for within Christianity was also available within Islam...and that I would be following the message of Jesus just as fully within the Islamic tradition.

He received a Ph.D. and M.Phil. in Islamic Studies from Yale University, an M.A. in Religious Studies and a B.A. from the George Washington University. In order to complement his Western university training, he studied Qur´an, Hadith, Sufism, and Islamic philosophy with traditional teachers in Morocco, Egypt, Yemen, and Iran. Lumbard began his teaching career at the American University in Cairo (2002–2005) after receiving a PhD in Islamic studies from Yale University. After serving as an advisor for interfaith affairs to King Abdullah II of Jordan, he became the director of the Islamic and Middle Eastern Studies Program at Brandeis University. He has also served as an assistant professor of Arabic and Translation Studies at the American University of Sharjah.

Lumbard has lectured in academic arenas around the world, participated in inter-faith dialogues, and appeared on several radio and television programs. He is also the founder and first director of the Islamic Research Institute.–

== Bibliography ==
- Aḥmad al-Ghazālī, Remembrance and the Metaphysics of Love (SUNY Press, 2016)
- The Study Quran, (Translator, commentary writer and General Editor) (HarperOne, Fall 2015)
- "Seyyed Hossein Nasr on Tradition and Modernity" in Tradition and Modernity ed. David Marshall (Georgetown University Press, 2014)
- "What of the Word is Common" in Muslim and Christian Understanding: Theory and Application of "A common Word" ed. Waleed El-Ansary and David K. Linnan (Praeger, 2012)
- From Hubb to 'Ishq: The Development of Love in Early Sufism, (Oxford Journal of Islamic Studies, 2008).
- Submission, Faith and Beauty: The Religion of Islam., (Hayward, 2007, Zaytuna Institute, 2008)
- Prophets and Messengers of God, "Voices of Islam", (Praeger Pub Text, 2007)
- Islam, Fundamentalism, and the Betrayal of Tradition, (World Wisdom, 2004)
- "The Function of Dhikrullāh in Sufi Psychology" in Knowledge is Light: Essays in Islamic Studies ed. Zaylan Morris (Kazi Publications: 2003)

== See also ==
- King Abdullah II of Jordan
- Sufism
- Seyyed Hossein Nasr
- Mohammed Rustom
- Caner Dagli
- Maria Massi Dakake
