= Three Sages =

Three Sages could refer to:

- Three Muslim Sages
- Doraemon: Nobita's Sky Utopia
- the Three Sages Hall in Longhua Temple
- Samseonggung (palace of the Three sages)
