= An Introduction to Islamic Cosmological Doctrines =

1964 book by Seyyed Hossein Nasr

An Introduction to Islamic Cosmological Doctrines is a 1964 book by the Iranian philosopher Seyyed Hossein Nasr.

== See also ==
- Ideals and Realities of Islam
- Three Muslim Sages

== Sources ==
- Rustom, Mohammed (2006). "An Introduction to Islamic Cosmological Doctrines: Conceptions of Nature and Methods Used for Its Study by the Ikhwan al-Safa, al-Biruni, and Ibn Sina". Parabola. 31 (3): 120–124.
- Ragep, F. Jamil (1994). "An Introduction to Islamic Cosmological Doctrines: Conceptions of Nature and Methods Used for Its Study by the Ikhwan al-Safa, al-Biruni, and Ibn Sina". Isis. 85 (3). University of Chicago Press: 504–505. doi:10.1086/356912. ISSN 0021-1753.
- Clarke, Peter B. (1980). "An Introduction to Islamic Cosmological Doctrines". Religious Studies. 16 (2). Cambridge University Press (CUP): 250–251. doi:10.1017/s0034412500012257. ISSN 0034-4125.
- Sabra, A. I. (1968). "An Introduction to Islamic Cosmological Doctrines". Journal of the American Oriental Society. 88 (3). JSTOR: 602-604. doi:10.2307/596914. ISSN 0003-0279. JSTOR 596914.
