= Seyyed Hossein Nasr =

Iranian philosopher, theologian, and Islamic scholar (born 1933)

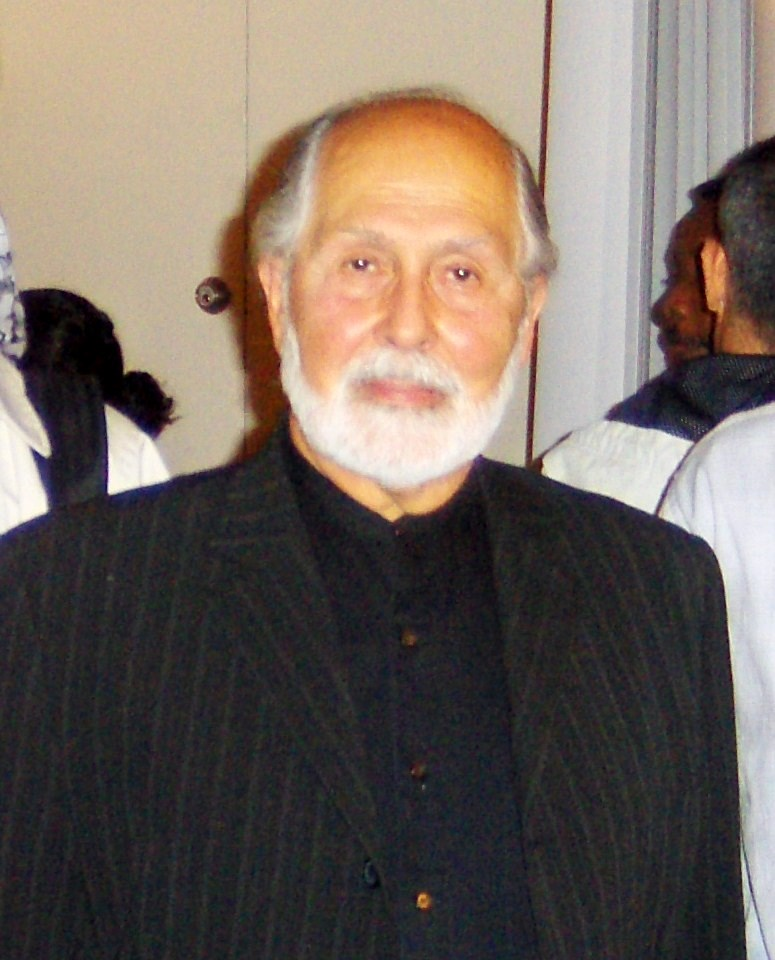
- Nasr in 2007
- Born: 7 April 1933 (age 93); Tehran, Imperial State of Persia

Education
- Education: Massachusetts Institute of Technology (BS); Harvard University (MA, PhD)

Philosophical work
- Era: Contemporary philosophy
- Region: Islamic philosophy
- School: Perennial philosophy, Sufism
- Main interests: Metaphysics, Philosophy of Religion, Philosophy of Science, Sufism, Islamic philosophy
- Notable ideas: Scientia sacra; Ecotheology; Islamic environmentalism; Tradition; Pontifical and Promethean man; Resacralization of nature; Desacralization of knowledge; Resacralization of knowledge

Seyyed Hossein Nasr (Note: /ˈnɑːsər, ˈnæsər/; Persian: سید حسین نصر, Persian pronunciation: [sejjed̪̥ hoséjn næsɹ].) (Persian pronunciation: [sejjed̪̥ hoséjn næsɹ]; born April 7, 1933) is an Iranian-American philosopher, theologian, and Islamic scholar. He is a University Professor of Islamic studies at George Washington University.

Born in Tehran, Nasr completed his education in the Imperial State of Iran and the United States, earning a B.A. in physics from Massachusetts Institute of Technology, a M.A. in geology and geophysics, and a doctorate in the history of science from Harvard University. He returned to his homeland in 1958, turning down teaching positions at MIT and Harvard, and was appointed a professor of philosophy and Islamic sciences at Tehran University. He held various academic positions in Iran, including vice-chancellor at Tehran University and president of Aryamehr University, and established the Imperial Iranian Academy of Philosophy at the request of Empress Farah Pahlavi, which soon became one of the most prominent centers of philosophical activity in the Islamic world. During his time in Iran, he studied with several traditional masters of Islamic philosophy and sciences.

In 1979, the Islamic Revolution in Iran forced him to exile with his family to the United States, where he has lived and taught Islamic sciences and philosophy ever since. He has been an active representative of the Islamic philosophical tradition and the perennialist school of thought, especially its Traditionalist stream.

Nasr's works offer a critique of modern worldviews as well as a defense of Islamic and perennialist doctrines and principles. Central to his argument is the claim that knowledge has become desacralized in the modern period, meaning that it has become severed from its divine source – God or the Ultimate Reality – which calls for its resacralization through the utilization of sacred traditions and sacred science. Although Islam and Sufism are major influences on his writings, his perennialist approach inquires into the essence of all orthodox religions, regardless of their formal particularities. His environmental philosophy is expressed in terms of Islamic environmentalism and resacralization of nature. He is the author of over fifty books and more than five hundred articles.

== Biography ==
=== Early life ===
Seyyed Hossein Nasr was born on April 7, 1933 in Tehran, Imperial State of Iran, to Seyyed Valiollah Nasr, who was a physician to the Iranian royal family, philosopher, and homme de lettres, and one of the founders of modern education in Iran. (Note: He wrote many essays which still remain in manuscript form, some of which have been assembled by Nasr into a book called Danish wa Akhlaq (Knowledge and Ethics).) He is a descendant of Sheikh Fazlollah Nouri from his mother's side, is the cousin of Iranian philosopher Ramin Jahanbegloo, as well as the father of American academic Vali Nasr. The surname "Nasr", which means "victory", was given to his grandfather by Reza Shah. The honorific title "Seyyed" indicates a descendant of the Islamic prophet Muhammad.

=== Education ===
Nasr completed his primary education in Tehran. His education was supplemented by religious and philosophical discussions with his father and an entourage of theologians, ministers, scholars, and mystics. He immersed himself in Quranic studies, Persian literature, Arabic and French languages at an early age. While he was completing his first year of secondary school at Firooz Bahram High School, his father was hurt in a serious accident, so his mother sent him to continue his education in the United States so that he would not be present at the time of his father's imminent death. He would later say that there are three things that his father left him: "first of all, love of knowledge for our own Persian culture, our religious, literary, philosophical tradition; secondly, an avid interest in what was going on in the West in the realm of science and philosophy, literature and everything else; thirdly, a sense of serenity that he had within himself."

In the United States, Nasr first attended Peddie School in Hightstown, New Jersey, graduating in 1950 as the valedictorian of his class. He then applied to the Massachusetts Institute of Technology in Boston to study physics and was accepted with a scholarship. When he realized, after an encounter with the philosopher Bertrand Russell, that the study of physics would not bring answers to his questions, he enrolled in additional courses on metaphysics and philosophy with Giorgio de Santillana who introduced him to the works of René Guénon. From there, Nasr discovered the works of other Perennialist metaphysicians, notably Frithjof Schuon, Ananda Coomaraswamy, Titus Burckhardt, Martin Lings, and Marco Pallis. This school of thought has shaped Nasr's life and thinking ever since. The widow of Commaraswamy gave him access to the library of her late husband, and Nasr spent much of his time there and worked to catalogue the library. He visited Schuon and Burckhardt in Switzerland while still a student, and was initiated into the Alawite branch of the Shadhili Sufi order. He considered the works of Schuon, with central importance given to the practice of a spiritual discipline in addition to doctrinal knowledge, especially instrumental in determining his intellectual and spiritual life.

After receiving a Bachelor of Science degree in physics at the Massachusetts Institute of Technology in 1954, Nasr enrolled in the graduate program in geology and geophysics at Harvard University, where he received a Master of Science degree in both fields in 1956, and went on to pursue his doctorate in the history of science and learning at the same university. He planned to write his dissertation under the supervision of George Sarton, but Sarton died before he could begin his dissertation work and so he wrote it under the direction of I. Bernard Cohen, Hamilton Gibb, and Harry Wolfson.

At the age of twenty-five, Nasr graduated with a Ph.D. from Harvard University and completed his first book, Science and Civilization in Islam, the title being a direct tribute to Science and Civilization in China, the work by Joseph Needham which had for task to present to Westerners the complex developments of the history of science and technology in China, a mission Nasr was himself following for the Islamic civilization. His doctoral dissertation entitled "Conceptions of Nature in Islamic Thought" was published in 1964 by Harvard University Press as An Introduction to Islamic Cosmological Doctrines.

Apart from mastering the Arabic and French he was initially taught in his childhood, during his student years Nasr also learned Greek, Latin, Italian, Spanish and German.

=== Back to Iran ===
After receiving his Ph.D. from Harvard in 1958, Nasr was offered the position of associate professor at MIT, as well as a three-year research position as a junior fellow followed by a formal teaching position at Harvard, but he decided to return to Iran. That same year, Tehran University hired him as associate professor of philosophy and the history of science. He continued his study of Islamic sciences with traditional Iranian masters and philosophers (Muhammad Husayn Tabataba'i, Allameh Sayyed Abul Hasan Rafiee Qazvini and Sayyid Muhammad Kazim Assar), completing his dual education, academic and traditional.

He had married and started a family at this point. His son, Vali Nasr, would go on to become an academic and specialist on the Islamic world.

At thirty, Nasr was the youngest person to become a full professor at Tehran University. He was quickly recognized as an authority in Islamic philosophy, Islamic science and Sufism. For fifteen years he conducted a doctoral seminar in comparative philosophy and Islamic philosophy with Henry Corbin who was at that time the director of the French Institute for Iranian Studies in Tehran. Five years later he would be made the dean of the faculty of letters and then vice-chancellor of the university.

In 1972, the Shah chose him to become the president of Aryamehr University (now Sharif University of Technology). There, Nasr created a faculty for the humanities in order to encourage the students not to focus exclusively on scientific matters. He also designed courses that focused on the assessment of modern technology and its impact on human society and the environment. During this time, he was also involved in the creation of the Islamic and Iranian studies departments at Harvard, Princeton, the University of Utah, and the University of Southern California.

I belonged to a new generation and was able to exercise much influence not only at Tehran University but also in the cultural and educational life of the country as a whole since I was a member of all the important national councils in those fields, [...] So there was a really formidable jihād on my hands to try to turn things around and to make Iranian society more aware of its own heritage. I tried to create a bridge between the traditional and the modern elements of our society. (interview)

Nasr refused to engage in the politics of his country despite a number of offers for ministerial positions and ambassadorship. In 1974, Empress Farah Pahlavi commissioned him to establish and lead the Imperial Iranian Academy of Philosophy (now the Institute for Research in Philosophy), the first academic institution to be conducted in accordance with the intellectual principles of the Traditionalist School. During that time, Nasr, Tabataba'i, William Chittick, Peter Lamborn Wilson, Kenneth Morgan, Sachiko Murata, Toshihiko Izutsu, and Henry Corbin held various philosophical discourses. The book Shi'ite Islam and the traditionalist journal Sophia Perennis were products of this period. In 1978, he was named director of the Empress's private bureau, while continuing to teach philosophy at Tehran University, and serve as chancellor of Aryamehr University, and president of the Imperial Iranian Academy of Philosophy.

=== Return to the West ===
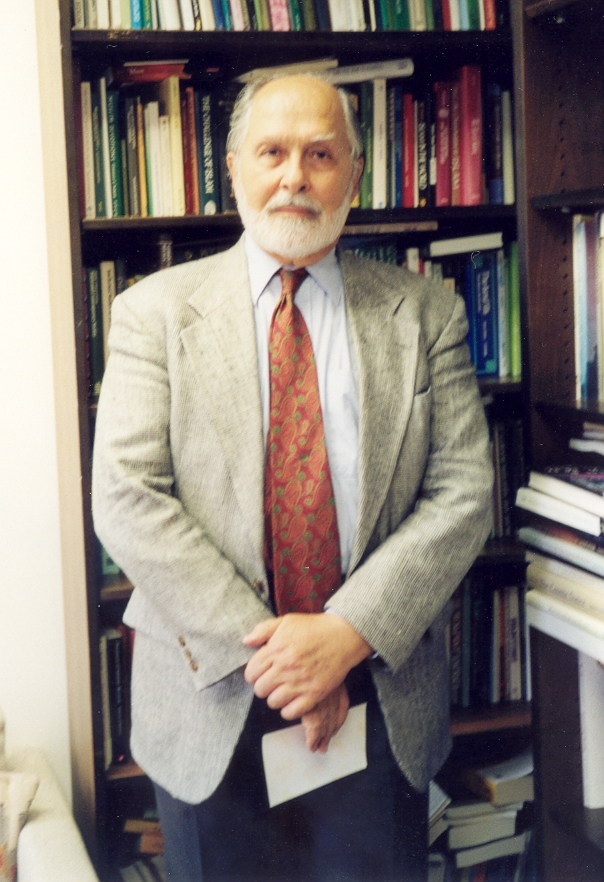
Nasr in 2002

In January 1979, the Iranian Revolution brought an end to the Pahlavi dynasty, and Nasr, who was visiting London with his family at the time, was unable to return to Iran. As a result, he lost his possessions, including his manuscripts and library. His family later settled in Boston. After teaching for a few months at the University of Utah, Nasr was appointed a professor of Islamic studies at Temple University in Philadelphia, which had one of the largest Ph.D. programs in religious studies in the United States. Ismail al-Faruqi was his colleague during his time there.

During the 1980 – 1981 academic year, Nasr delivered the Gifford lectures at the University of Edinburgh, which were later published under the title Knowledge and the Sacred. According to William Chittick, "three out of the four of his first books in English (An Introduction to Islamic Cosmological Doctrines, Three Muslim Sages, and Science and Civilization in Islam) were published by Harvard University Press, and they immediately established him as one of the major and original voices in Islamic studies. His strong endorsement of the writings of Schuon and Burckhardt in these books were in turn instrumental in bringing the Traditionalist school to the notice of official academia".

Nasr left Temple University in 1984 to become a professor of Islamic studies at George Washington University in Washington, D.C., a position he holds to this day. That same year, he established the Foundation for Traditional Studies which published the journal Sophia and works on traditional thought. He has authored over fifty books and over five hundred articles based on the principles of the philosophia perennis. He is regularly invited to give courses and conferences at various institutions and universities of the five different continents on the major themes for which he has become well known: Islam, philosophy, metaphysics, cosmology, anthropology, spirituality, religion, science, ecology, literature, art, etc. (Note: He was visiting scholar (Harvard University) in 1962 and 1965, Aga Khan chair of Islamic studies (American University at Beirut) in 1964–65, Rockefeller Lectures (University of Chicago) in 1966, Kevorkian Lectures (New York University) in 1977, Gifford Lectures (University of Edinburgh) in 1980–81, Wiegand Lecture (University of Toronto) in 1983, Parliament of World Religions (Chicago) in 1993, Cadbury Lectures (University of Birmingham) in 1994, Islam and the West (UNO) in 2003.) His works have been translated into twenty-eight different languages. He retired from teaching in December 2025, but announced plans to continue writing and publishing.

== Notable aspects of his works ==
Nasr's expertise encompasses traditional culture (wisdom, religion, philosophy, science and art), Western thought from antiquity to the present day, and the history of science. He argues in favor of revelation, tradition, and what he considers "scientia sacra", in opposition to rationalism, relativism, and modern western materialism.

Nasr has not developed a new system of thought, but instead hopes to revive traditional doctrines that he believes have been forgotten in the modern world. He is content to recall what, according to him, corresponds to the many manifestations of a timeless wisdom. Although Islam and Sufism are present throughout his writings, his universalist perspective, which is that of perennial philosophy, takes into account what he assumes to be the common essence of all orthodox religions beyond their formal particularities or their current state: "My philosophical world is a kind of synthesis between the perennial philosophy, which I espouse and represent, and the Islamic philosophical tradition, which I have tried to revive and to which I also belong. And so I would say that for the first category, there are Guénon and Schuon; if I had to name a third person, then Coomaraswamy; and for the second category, Ibn Sina, Suhrawardı, Ibn Arabi, and Mulla Sadra." According to Sarah Robinson-Bertoni, Nasr is one of the principal figures in Islamic philosophy, working at the crossroads of Western and Islamic intellectual traditions.

Harry Oldmeadow considers Nasr to be "of the living traditionalists the most widely known in academic circles". For him, Nasr's works are characterized by "rigorous scholarly methodology, an encyclopedic erudition about all matters Islamic, a robustness of critical thought, and a sustained clarity of expression"; and he is "the foremost traditionalist thinker" to base himself on "eternal wisdom (sophia perennis)" in order to provide a solution to the contemporary environmental crisis.

=== Perennialist or Traditionalist school ===
When he discovered the writings of the most influential members of what would become the Traditionalist or Perennialist school (René Guénon, Frithjof Schuon, Ananda Coomaraswamy, Titus Burckhardt, Martin Lings), the student Nasr fully aligned himself to their perspective founded on the philosophia perennis. (Note: "The term philosophia perennis, which appeared as early as the Renaissance and which neoscolasticism made extensive use of, designates the science of the fundamental and universal ontological principles; this science is immutable like these principles themselves are and it is primordial by the very fact of its universality and infallibility. We would willingly use the term sophia perennis to indicate that this is not "philosophy" in the standard and approximative meaning of the word – which suggests mere mental constructions springing from ignorance, doubt, and conjectures, if not from an urge for novelty and originality – or the term religio perennis could also be used when referring to the operative dimension of this wisdom, namely to its mystical or initiatic aspect." Frithjof Schuon, Survey of Metaphysics (quoted by Nasr).)

I had discovered a worldview about which I felt complete certitude (yaqın). I felt that this was the truth that satisfied me intellectually and accorded with my life existentially. It was in harmony with the faith that I had. It was universalist in its metaphysical perspective and also critical of Western philosophy and science in a manner that spoke directly to my concerns. (interview)

Thus, in the middle of a "materialistic century", this School provides Nasr with the keys to his spiritual quest: an esoteric doctrine and method within the framework of a Sufi path. For Patrick Laude:

... Seyyed Hossein Nasr's background is remarkable in at least three ways: first, he is a public figure who has been widely recognized in the media – in both the US and Europe – as a spokesman for perennialist ideas. [...] Second, he is the only perennialist writer who is closely identified with a given religious tradition, both as being born in it and as being a world expert on many of its dimensions. [...] Thirdly, Nasr is the only foremost perennialist writer to have received an intensive and advanced academic training in modern sciences. [...] His familiarity and identification with Islam, his validation as a recognized scholar and respected member of the scholarly community, and his conceptual proficiency in modern scientific languages have all contributed to make him a particularly apt interpreter of perennialist ideas in the contemporary public arena.

For Nasr, the expression "philosophia perennis", as understood by the Perennialist school, refers to both the universal metaphysical truth and to its spiritual realization. The latter can only be considered, according to Nasr, in the framework of a tradition, thus with the aid of a method, rites, symbols and other means sanctified by revelation. The truth, though veiled, is innate to the human spirit and its realization leads to what he calls "knowledge", that is to say gnosis or wisdom (sophia), hence the expression "sophia perennis", common ground at the heart of all religions. Nasr clarifies that the notion of the philosophia perennis does not derive from a compilation "of wisdom writings of various historical traditions", which would have resulted in the conviction of the existence of common truths, but it is these very truths which, by "the practice of intellection, the use of the intellect" understood in a spiritual manner, are revealed to the human spirit which then observes "their presence in other times and climes and in fact in all the sacred traditions the world over". The language of the perennial philosophy is symbolism.

=== God and the world ===
According to Nasr, the "Divine Reality" includes, metaphysically speaking, an "Impersonal Essence" and a personal aspect that the believer "ordinarily identifies with God", in accordance with the perspective of "most religions". Only the "esoteric dimension" within these religions take into account the "Impersonal Essence", as can be seen most notably in "the Kabbalah, Sufism, and among many Christian mystics such as Meister Eckhart and Angelus Silesius". "God as ultimate Reality" is thus at the same time "Essence" and "Person" or "Supra-Being and Being". Understood in this way, God or the Principle,

is Reality in contrast to all that appears as real but which is not reality in the ultimate sense. The Principle is the Absolute compared to which all is relative. It is Infinite while all else is finite. The Principle is One and Unique while manifestation is multiplicity. It is the Supreme Substance compared to which all else is accident. It is the Essence to which all things are juxtaposed as form. It is at once Beyond Being and Being while the order of multiplicity is comprised of existents. It alone is while all else becomes, for It alone is eternal in the ultimate sense while all that is externalized partakes of change. It is the Origin but also the End, the alpha and the omega. It is Emptiness if the world is envisaged as fullness and Fullness if the relative is perceived in the light of its ontological poverty and essential nothingness. These are all manners of speaking of the Ultimate Reality which can be known but not by man as such. It can only be known through the sun of the Divine Self residing at the center of the human soul.

God is not only "Absolute and Infinite", he is also "the Supreme Good or Perfection". Now, according to Nasr, the specificity of infinitude and of good in divinis requires that they exteriorize themselves, that is to say, that they manifest themselves in multiplicity, hence the world. (Note: According to Saint Augustine, Nasr reminds us, "it is in the nature of the good to give of itself". The Philosophy of Seyyed Hossein Nasr, 2001, p. 584) A world that is imperfect despite the perfection of its source because, as Nasr explains, this exteriorization implies a distance from the "Good", hence the presence of evil; the latter, contrary to the good, does not have its root in God. This "imperfect world" – the visible and tangible world of man – constitutes only the periphery of a hierarchy of increasingly subtle "worlds" according to their degree of proximity to Being.

For Nasr, God is the only reality, and the world, which participates in his reality is therefore "unreal", not as "nothingness pure and simple" but as "relative reality"; it is an illusion to consider the world, says Nasr, as "reality" in the same way as the Principle. Nasr holds that traditional wisdom or the sophia perennis "has always seen God as Reality and the world as a dream from which the sage awakens through [spiritual] realization ... and the ordinary man through death". To consider the world as "the reality ... as is done by most modern philosophy ... leads to nihilism and skepticism by reducing God to an abstraction, to the 'unreal', and philosophy itself to the discussion of more or less secondary questions or to providing clever answers to ill-posed problems".

For Nasr, "Ultimate Reality" is at once "above everything" and "omnipresent" in the universe, "transcendent and immanent". On the human plane, still according to Nasr, "The Reality" – or "The Truth" (Note: "Islam is a religion which is based completely on the doctrine of the oneness of God, and is a religion in which God is seen as both Reality and Truth, the Arabic term al-haqīqah meaning both. In fact the word al-Haqq (The Truth), which is related to haqīqah, is a Name of God." Nasr, The Need for a Sacred Science, 1993, p. 7.) – lies in the heart of man "created in the image of God", whence the possibility of a "unitive knowledge which sees the world not as separative creation but as manifestation that is united through symbols and the very ray of existence".

=== Human nature and its relationship to the divine ===
"The key to the understanding of the anthrōpos", according to Nasr, is situated in "sapential teachings"; it is neither situated in "exoteric religious formulations", which relate essentially to "salvation", nor in what he considers to be "profane" science, generally evolutionary. Beyond his faith in "creationism ex nihilo" Nasr believes that the doctrines "of all traditions" attest that "the genesis of man, occurred in many stages: first, in the Divinity Itself so that there is an uncreated 'aspect' to man", hence the possibility of "supreme union"; then "in the Logos which is in fact the prototype of man and another face of that same reality which the Muslims call the Universal Man and which each tradition identifies with its founder"; after this, "man is created on the cosmic level and what the Bible refers to as the celestial paradise where he is dressed with a luminous body"; "he then descends to the level of the terrestrial paradise and is given yet another body of an ethereal and incorruptible nature"; finally, "he is born into the physical world with a body which perishes" but he principally remains a reflection of "the Absolute not only in his spiritual and mental faculties but even in his body".

Thus, Nasr rejects biology's modern evolutionary synthesis, which he thinks is a "desperate attempt to substitute a set of horizontal, material causes in a unidimensional world to explain effects whose causes belong to other levels of reality". For Nasr, in accordance with "the traditional view of the anthrōpos", the human being is a "bridge between Heaven and earth (pontifex)". Responsible to God for his actions, he is the custodian and protector of the earth, "on the condition that he remain faithful to himself as the central terrestrial figure created in the 'form of God' ... living in this world but created for eternity". This aspect of humanity, for Nasr, "is reflected in all of his being and his faculties".

Among these faculties, Nasr underlines the primacy of intelligence, sentiments, and will: "as a theomorphic being", his intelligence "can know the truth as such", his sentiments "are capable ... of reaching out for the ultimate through love, suffering, sacrifice, and also fear", and his will "is free to choose ... it reflects the Divine Freedom". But, "because of man's separation from his original perfection", a consequence "of what Christianity calls the fall", itself followed by further declines, these faculties no longer operate invariably according to their "theomorphic nature". Thus, "intelligence can become reduced to mental play", "sentiments can deteriorate to little more than gravitation around that illusory coagulation which [...] is the ego" and "the will can be debased to nothing other than the urge to do that which removes man from the source of his own being".

"All traditional sciences of nature ... are also sciences of the self on the basis of the microcosmic-macrocosmic correspondence", therefore by virtue of an "inward link that binds man as the microcosm to the cosmos". This ideal man, underlines Nasr, is "primordial man ... perfect ... plenary reflection of all those Divine Qualities", who knew everything "in God and through God".

==== Knowledge and the intellect ====
According to Nasr, "man contains within himself many levels of existence" that "the Western tradition" synthesises in the ternary "spirit, soul, and body (pneuma, psychē, and hylē or spiritus, anima, and corpus". "The human spirit is an extension and reflection of the Divine Spirit", it coincides with the "intellect" and "resides at the center of the spiritual heart" of the human being. Nasr always uses the word "intellect" in "its original sense of intellectus (nous)" and not "of reason (ratio)", which is only its "reflection" and which "is identified with the analytical functions of the mind"; "the intellect is the light of the sacred shining upon our minds".

The intellect, which "is the root and the center of consciousness" is also "the source of inner illumination and intellection", which Nasr, following Guénon, also calls "intellectual intuition", and that implies an "illumination of the heart and the mind of man", making possible a "knowledge of an immediate and direct nature, [...] tasted and experienced", which extends to "certain aspects of reality" (Note: "The physical world is related to God by levels of reality which transcend the physical world itself and which constitute the various stages of the cosmic hierarchy." Nasr, The Essential Seyyed Hossein Nasr, 2007, p. 34.) up to "the Absolute Reality". The human intellect is "the subjective pole of the Word or of the Logos – the universal Intellect – by which all things were made and which constitutes the source of objective revelation, that is to say, formal and established religion". For Nasr, in the vast majority of cases, this "inner revelation", or intellection, cannot become operative except by virtue of an external revelation which provides an objective cadre for it and enables it to be spiritually efficacious", hence the necessity of faith and spiritual practices associated with the realization of the virtues, with the aid of the grace issuing from each revelation.

Huston Smith summarizes, in an analysis of Nasr's works, that Nasr contends it is "God who knows Himself" through man. For Nasr, indeed, "discrimination between the Real and the unreal terminates in the awareness of the nondual nature of the Real, the awareness which is the heart of gnosis and which represents not human knowledge but God's knowledge of Himself", consciousness which is at the same time "the goal of the path of knowledge and the essence of scientia sacra". Nasr contends that this wisdom, which corresponds – beyond salvation -– to deliverance from the bonds of all limitation, "is present in the heart of all traditions", whether it be the Hindu Vedanta, Buddhism, the Jewish Kabbalah, the Christian metaphysics of an Eckhart or an Erigena, or Sufism. It alone "is able to solve certain apparent contradictions and riddles in sacred texts".

Through such sacred knowledge, man ceases to be what he appears to be to become what he really is in the eternal now and what he has never ceased to be.

=== Sacredness ===
Terry Moore, in his introduction to a long interview that Seyyed Hossein Nasr gave to the Iranian philosopher Ramin Jahanbegloo, recalls that for Nasr,

the Sacred is the Eternal Absolute Truth as It manifests Itself in our world. It is the appearance of the Eternal in time, the Center in the periphery, of the Divine in the world of space and time. The Sacred is present in Itself and in Its manifestations.

Still, according to Moore, it is this relationship with the sacred, through the channel of "Tradition" that anchors Seyyed Hossein Nasr's worldview. Nasr considers the sense of the sacred as inseparable from any spiritual quest. This sense emanates from the awareness of the eternal and immutable reality of the Divine, which is both transcendent and immanent to all universal manifestation, therefore also to the human being. The sacred manifests itself in "revelation, the sacred rites of various religions, spiritual and initiatory practices, sacred art, virgin nature", in fact everything that transmits "the presence of the Divine".

It is possible for us to rediscover the sacred character of both knowledge and the world, and one might say that that has been the basic motif throughout my writings.

=== Metaphysics ===
For Nasr, true metaphysics – the scientia sacra –, which is the intellectual foundation of the Traditionalist School, "is the science of the Real; of the origin and the end of things; of the Absolute and in its light, the relative" and, as a corollary, of the degrees of existence. It is therefore:

the knowledge by means of which man is able to distinguish between the Real and the illusory and to know things in their essence or as they are, which means ultimately to know them in divinis. The knowledge of the Principle which is at once the absolute and infinite Reality is the heart of metaphysics while the distinction between levels of universal and cosmic existence, including both the macrocosm and the microcosm, are like its limbs. [...] metaphysics is the primary and fundamental science or wisdom which [...] contains the principles of all the sciences.

True metaphysics, underlines Nasr, can only be assimilated by intellectual intuition, (Note: "Scientia sacra is none other than that sacred knowledge which lies at the heart of every revelation and is the center of that circle which encompasses and defines tradition. [...] the twin source of this knowledge is revelation and intellection or intellectual intuition which involves the illumination of the heart and the mind of man and the presence in him of knowledge of an immediate and direct nature which is tasted and experienced [...]. Man is able to know and this knowledge corresponds to some aspect of reality. Ultimately in fact, knowledge is knowledge of Absolute Reality and intelligence possesses this miraculous gift of being able to know that which is and all that partakes of being. [...] Man can know through intuition and revelation not because he is a thinking being who imposes the categories of his thought upon what he perceives but because knowledge is being." Nasr, Knowledge and the Sacred, 1989, p.119-120.) that is to say that it is necessarily associated with a path of spiritual realization, an approach foreign to modern philosophy, which has been instrumental in reducing the significance of metaphysics to just another mental activity. Metaphysical knowledge stems from the true understanding of symbolism.

=== Religion and spirituality ===
According to Nasr, man is "a theomorphic being living in this world but created for eternity" because his "soul is immortal". The post-mortem salvation of the soul, reminds Nasr, is "the first duty of man", according to every religion, – a soul tainted here below by its "centrifugal tendencies", its "passions".

Nasr contends that all religions have an origin in God, reveal the paths which "leads to either felicity in the hereafter or damnation, to the paradisal or infernal states", and require "faith".

Each new "descent" of a revelation brings a particular "spiritual genius", "fresh vitality, uniqueness and the grace which make its rites and practices operative, not to speak of the paradisal vision which constitutes the origin of its sacred art or of the sapience which lies at the heart of its message". This wisdom, continues Nasr, accounts for the "Ultimate Reality", which is both "beyond everything and at the very heart and center of man's soul", that is to say in his "spirit". The quest for wisdom or knowledge, through "spiritual practice" and the "cultivation of virtues", can lead to "salvation in the highest sense of this term, which means total deliverance from the bonds of all limitations".

Nasr argues that spirituality requires a constant practice and a rigorous discipline within the framework of a religion, and he considers the current commercialization of the "pseudo-spiritual" to be indicative of people wanting the spiritual result without the effort.

Daoud Riffi emphasizes that Sufism is the spiritual path followed by Seyyed Hossein Nasr in a universalist framework which attests to the principial unity of all major religions. Nasr's Sufism relates to the intellect in its medieval sense, that is, the spiritual heart: "True knowledge is therefore a matter of the heart, not of the mind, and the fruit of an interior asceticism."

==== Exoterism and esoterism ====
Nasr says that every integral religion "possesses at once an external or exoteric dimension" and "an inner or esoteric dimension". The first is "concerned with the external and formal aspect of human life" with a view to the posthumous salvation of those "who follow the precepts" of their religion and who "have faith in its truths". The second concerns "the formless and the essential" with a view to the realization of "the Supreme Essence, here and now".

These two dimensions unfold in "a hierarchy of levels from the most outward to the most inward which is the Supreme Center". Nasr thus distinguishes three modes of "approaching ultimate Reality": "the ways of work, love and knowledge", which correspond to as many predispositions of human nature. The most interiorizing paths integrate those which are less so, but the latter, not necessarily possessing the capacity "to understand what is beyond them", sometimes become the causes of "tensions" within the same religion. Nasr adds that "all human beings can be saved if only they follow religion according to their own nature and vocation". And he warns "on the social level, on the level of human action, the barriers and conditions established by the exoteric dimension of the religion should not be transgressed", including by those who "follow the path of esoterism, the inward or mystical path".

Since there are "questions that exoterism cannot answer," it is important "for religion to keep alive the reality and the significance of esoterism for people who have the capability and need to understand the inner or esoteric dimension of the tradition". This is what Islam, for example, continues to accomplish today with its inner dimension, Sufism, which remains a living tradition. On the other hand,

what happened in Christianity, which is a great tragedy, I believe, for both Christianity and Western civilization, and in fact for the rest of the world, is that after the Renaissance, gradually a wall was created, and Western Christianity's inner dimension became more or less inaccessible and to a large extent eclipsed. It is not accidental that during the last two or three hundred years, Christianity has not produced figures such as a Meister Eckhart, Tauler, or Saint Bernard of Clairvaux, and we could go down the list of hundreds of earlier great saints and mystics. [...] today so many people of Christian background look to Buddhism, Islam, and Hinduism for the inner dimension of religion. (interview)

==== Essential unity of religions ====
In a commentary on a work by Nasr, Adnan Aslan reports that for Nasr, the various religions are "forms of the eternal truth which has been revealed by God to humankind through various agencies". It is this common truth which constitutes "the transcendent unity of religions", he says, referring to the expression proposed by Frithjof Schuon.

"It is only on the level of the Supreme Essence ... standing above all the cosmic sectors from the angelic to the physical within which a particular religion is operative, that the ultimate unity of religions is to be sought". This unity, for Nasr, is "not to be found at the level of external forms; [...] religions do not simply say the same thing despite the remarkable unanimity of principles and doctrines and the profound similarity of applications of these principles". At the heart of every religion lies "what Schuon calls the religio perennis", that is to say, "a doctrine concerning the nature of reality and a method for being able to attain what is Real". Doctrine and method vary from one religion to another but their essence and goal are universal.

As a result, no religion is in itself "better" than another, concludes Nasr, since "all authentic religions come from the same Origin", but in practical terms it is nevertheless necessary "to distinguish the possibilities" that remain valid in the current state of "degradation" of each of the religions. For Nasr, given the celestial origin of all religions, it is appropriate to respect their slightest particularities and to treat them "with reverence, as every manifestation of the sacred should be".

==== Interreligious dialogue ====
According to Jane I. Smith, Nasr is "one of the most visible partners" of Islamic-Christian dialogue thanks to "his training in Christian theology and philosophy, combined with his remarkable knowledge of all Islamic sciences".

Nasr points out that ordinary believers consider their religion to be the religion. Injunctions such as: "I am the way, the truth, the life" (Jesus) or "No one sees God unless he has seen me" (Mohammed), necessarily lead, for these same believers, to the certainty of the pre-eminence of their own religion, a conviction that could lead to the refusal to consider other religions as valid. This refusal, for Nasr, can be considered as legitimate since it stems from revelation, therefore from God; God wants to "save souls", he does not ask the believer to deal with "comparative religion" nor to accept the validity of other revelations. In a traditional world, such exclusivism presented no hindrance, but in today's world, the mixing of populations calls many believers to question the value of the religions they encounter daily.

Religion as it is seen in the world, says Nasr, "comes from the wedding between a Divine Norm and a human collectivity destined providentially to receive the imprint of that Norm." Thus, "racial, ethnic and cultural differences" constitute "one of the causes for multiplicity" of religions, "but religion itself cannot be reduced to its terrestrial embodiment". For Nasr, there is only one truth and it necessarily manifests itself in "all the different authentic religious universes, otherwise God would not be merciful and just". But it is not, according to Nasr, the exoteric level, that of divergences, which allows access to a true understanding and acceptance of other religions; only esotericism, which transcends the formal dimensions of religions, allows, according to him, uncompromising adherence to the authenticity of all revelations, by recognizing in them a supra-formal unity which resolves these very differences.

Nasr actively participates in the dialogue between Christians and Muslims. In 2008, he was the main Muslim speaker, opposite Benedict XVI, at the first Catholic-Muslim Forum organized by the Vatican. For Nasr, "one of the reasons why it is so difficult to have a deep religious dialogue today" with Christians, is due – besides their conviction "that there is no salvation outside the Church" (Note: Exclusivism alien to Islam, "for the Quran asserts clearly that people who do good works and have faith will be rewarded for their actions and will be saved, but does not say that this is true for only Muslims. There are some exclusivist and short-sighted Muslims today who believe that anyone who is not a Muslim is an infidel and will go therefore to hell, but that is not the traditional Islamic doctrine and goes against the text of the Quran". Interview in In Search of the Sacred, 2010, p. 292. Nasr refers here, among others, to Quran 2:62: "Indeed the faithful, the Jews, the Christians, and the Sabaeans, those of them who have faith in God and the Last Day and act righteously, they shall have their reward near their Lord, and they will have no fear, nor will they grieve".) – to the absence of an "esoteric dimension, interior [...], mystical", which centuries of secularism have stifled. For Islam, which is not "theologically threatened by the presence of other religions in the same way that Christianity is", the influence of secularism occurred much later than in the West, and Sufism, which is its interior dimension, continues to inspire "the most profound doctrines that have been formulated concerning the plurality of religions and the relationship between them".

For Nasr, as Jahanbegloo emphasizes, dialogue is "not only a pursuit of truth, but also a challenge to spiritual responsibility" of each religion to try to "heal the wounds of the present-day secularized world" in which we live.

=== Tradition ===
In Knowledge and the Sacred, Nasr defines tradition as follows:

Tradition as used in its technical sense [...], means truths or principles of a divine origin revealed or unveiled to mankind and, in fact, a whole cosmic sector through various figures envisaged as messengers, prophets, avatāras, the Logos or other transmitting agencies, along with all the ramifications and applications of these principles in different realms including law and social structure, art, symbolism, the sciences, and embracing of course Supreme Knowledge along with the means for its attainment.

For Nasr, the tradition therefore presents two aspects: "one is truths that are of a transcendent order in their origin, that came from the Divine, from God", revealed at the birth of each of the great religions and, on the other hand, the transmission of these truths by these same religions and by the civilizations they have generated; tradition is therefore not limited to religion – this is its heart – but it is deployed in all areas of a culture, hence the names "traditional art, traditional sciences, traditional architecture, traditional music, traditional clothing, etc."

Following René Guénon – to whom he is "indebted for clarifying this fundamental concept" –, Nasr refers to a "Primordial Tradition", which he defines as being the single truth from which emanate all truths, the immutable and timeless archetype from which all traditions originate. According to Nasr, at a time when Heaven and Earth were still "united", the original or archetypal man was directly enlightened, spiritually and intellectually, by the Primordial Tradition.

The value of tradition, for Nasr, is not manifested by a simple nostalgia for the past, it stems from the wisdom that this tradition conveys, instructing the human being on his own nature and that of the world, and calling him to achieve his original perfection. Only the truths conveyed by tradition, continues Nasr, allow us to grasp the full scope of the errors of modern thought and its misdeeds on man and nature.

=== Ecology ===
That the harmony between man and nature has been destroyed is a fact which most people admit. But not everyone realizes that this disequilibrium is due to the destruction of the harmony between man and God.

It was in 1966, during the Rockefeller Foundation Lectures at the University of Chicago, that Seyyed Hossein Nasr, for the first time, made public the importance that he placed on nature and his concern for its degradation. He was one of the first philosophers to turn to this question and he is considered to be the founder of environmentalism in the Muslim world. In several works he deals with the causes of the mutilation of the planet and the restorative remedies.

Causes

Tarik Quadir argues that "the ecological crisis, for Nasr, is only an externalization of an inner malaise [...] due in large part to the various applications of modern [western] science. [...] Following the loss of the vision of the universe proper to medieval Christian worldview, [...] this science ignores or denies the existence of any reality other than that of the material aspect of nature". Indeed, as Nasr explains, "the Renaissance and its aftermath […] witnessed the rise of a secular humanism and the absolutization of earthly man with immeasurable consequences for both the world of nature and traditional civilizations conquered by this new type of man, who gives free rein to his Promethean ambition to dominate nature and its forces in order to gain wealth or to conquer others civilizations, or both. [...] Nature, more than a lifeless mass, has thus become a machine to be dominated and manipulated by a purely earthly man". Thus, it is "to modernism and its false presumptions about the nature of man and the world", that Nasr attributes "the destruction of the natural environment", in addition to "the disintegration of the social fabric", and he deplores that all States, "from monarchies to communist governments, to revolutionary regimes, […] all want to copy avidly Western science and technology, without thought of their cultural, social and environmental consequences".

Nasr believes that another cause of ecological problems is found in scientism, that is, the conviction that "modern science provides if not the only, at least the most reliable means to true knowledge" and that it leads thereby "to human progress", as imagined by those who evaluate a human society solely in terms of its economic growth. Nasr corroborates the observation that the development of the current economic system rests largely on human passions, which it feeds in its turn, thus generating a continuous blossoming of new needs which, in reality, are only desires. Finally, "if modern man destroys nature with such impunity, it is because he looks upon it as a mere economic resource".

Remedies

Quadir maintains that for Nasr, it is not by technology that environmental problems can be solved in the long term, being themselves the consequence of this technology. According to Nasr, the critique of the extraordinary technological development is certainly necessary, but the real critique must start with the root of the problem, i.e. with oneself, because in a desacralized West, few are aware of what Nasr considers the raison d'être of human life and of nature. This consciousness, for Nasr, is present in the wisdom of the various religious traditions, "as well as in their cosmologies and sacred sciences". And it alone makes it possible to rediscover "the sense of the sacred", in particular with regard to nature,because deprived of this sense, the human being remains immersed in the ephemeral, abandoning himself to his own lower nature, with an illusory feeling of freedom.

As a consequence, the philosopher Ramin Jahanbegloo argues that Nasr's goal "is to negate the totalitarian claims of modern science and to reopen the way to the religious view of the order of nature, developed over centuries in the cosmologies and sacred sciences of the great traditions". "Once the awareness comes of what really nature is, warns Nasr, that nature is not just an 'it', that it is a living reality and has a sacred content, that it has an inner relation with our own inner being, [...] that we cannot destroy nature without destroying ourselves. [...], then we will begin to respect her" and, consequently, the dominant technology will initiate a reconversion. Realizing then, by this interior transformation, that true happiness is not linked to consumption, the human being will recognize his "real and not imagined needs", the only solution to slow down the uncontrolled appetite which leads to the daily rape of the planet.

=== Critique of modernism ===
Nasr says that it was in the Renaissance in the West (14th–16th centuries) that the "modernist" or reductive vision of the human condition and the universe began to take shape, and spread to other continents during the past two centuries. This ideology is characterized by "the rejection of the theocentric view of reality", hence an absolutization of the human to the detriment of the Divine, but of a human denying his "pontifical nature", (Note: Joseph E. B. Lumbard: "The sharp and uncompromising distinction that Nasr makes between tradition and modernity also entails a sharp contrast between modern man and traditional man, or what he refers to as pontifical man, who functions as a bridge between heaven and earth, and promethean man, who has rebelled against heaven. Regarding the former he writes: ‘‘Pontifical man, who, in the sense used here, is none other than traditional man, lives in a world which has both an Origin and a Center. He lives in full awareness of the Origin which contains his own perfection and whose primordial purity and wholeness he seeks to emulate, recapture, and transmit." Seyyed Hossein Nasr on Tradition and Modernity, 2013, p.179.) therefore reduced "to his rational and animal aspects, [wandering] in a desacralized wasteland, oblivious to his origin" and living only at the periphery of his being and of the universe.

Nasr considers that after the Renaissance, faith no longer had the monolithic cohesion of the Middle Ages. The "new man" is no longer defined by "his celestial archetype and his Edenic perfection", nor by his "symbolic and contemplative spirit", but by his "individuality, reason, the senses, corporeality [and his] subjectivism". Nasr contends that this marked the beginning of the ever increasing secularization of man and of knowledge, which, step by step, lead the West to skepticism, relativism, individualism, materialism, progressivism, evolutionism, historicism, scientism, agnosticism, atheism and, ultimately, what he considers the present chaos.

According to Nasr, given that the wisdom conveyed by the various traditional civilizations finds its origin in a divine revelation, these civilizations have always transmitted a fair representation of man and his purpose. Thus, as Joseph E. B. Lumbard notes, for Nasr, "only tradition can provide the weapon necessary to carry out the vital battle for the preservation of the things of the spirit in a world which would completely devour man as a spiritual being if it could". According to Nasr:

To defend the traditional point of view is not to negate the reality of all kinds of evil in the premodern world ranging from wars to philosophical skepticism among the Greeks in the dying moments of that civilization. The major difference is that in traditional civilizations while there was evil, the sacred was ubiquitous and people lived in the world of faith. Today evil continues in many more insidious ways while the very meaning of life which is the quest and discovery of the sacred is taken away.

==== Theory of evolution ====
Professor Judy D. Saltzman recalls in an article dedicated to Nasr, that the vast majority of post-Darwinian scientists claim that life appeared after matter, while for Nasr no inert matter can transform into living matter in the absence of a pre-existing life energy, just as it is impossible, according to mathematical theory of information, to extract more information from a system than it contains. For Nasr, "life comes before matter, the subtle world before life, the Spirit before the subtle world, and the Ultimate Reality before everything else".

For Nasr, the results of modern scientific investigation of nature are defined by the "oblivion of intellect" and, thus, are "severed from Divinity and highly compartmentalized". He maintains that the scientific explanations for the origins of the natural world are "purely physical" and "aimed at reducing man to matter while excluding divinity and teleology from nature". On this basis, Nasr rejects the theory of evolution, claiming that it is "an ideology, it is not ordinary science," that it is "more a pseudo-religion than a scientific theory," that it "requires more faith than is claimed by any religion for its founder or even for God," and that evolution is both metaphysically and logically impossible. (Note: Nasr rejects this theory for the following reasons. In Knowledge and the Sacred, 1989: the sudden appearance, noted by scientists, of new species in various geological periods and over very extended areas, such as some unrelated vertebrate groups, which contradicts an evolution in the direction of progressive complexity (p. 206); the almost total absence, in the stratigraphic records, of fossils that should exist as intermediates between the major groups (p.206); the testimony of biologists and paleontologists who, while accepting the theory of evolution in the absence of a plausible scientific alternative, remain "fully aware of the fantastic and even surrealistic character" of this theory (p.207 + Hahn, 2001, p. 755); the variations which are presented by advocates of evolution as "buds" of a new species are only variants within the framework of a single species, each species possessing a potential for development which can only manifest itself within the species in question; this micro-evolution is the only possible evolution (pp. 206–207 + On the Question of Biological Origins, 2006, p.4). In On the Question of Biological Origins, 2006: the impossibility of the appearance of sight in a blind animal or a pair of wings in an insect or a fish which, moreover, would have to practice flying (pp. 6, 10); the impossibility, starting from an animal intelligence, of developing a capacity of reasoning as sophisticated as that which characterizes the human being, whose consciousness is able to reflect on itself, to be conscious of being conscious (p. 12 + Saltzman, 2001, p. 595); finally, the impossibility, on a qualitative level, that the "less" can generate the "more" (p. 5).) The sociologist Farzin Vahdat sees this as part of Nasr's relativization of secular reason and secular science, and more broadly of his criticism of the modern mentality.

Marietta Stepaniants observes that, for Nasr, "the absurdity of that theory" is that it offers only "horizontal and material causes in a unidimensional world, to explain effects whose causes belong to other levels of reality". As an alternative, Nasr defends his vision of an Islamic philosophy of science that accepts "limited biological changes" occurring throughout time, but rejects the idea that solely natural mechanisms account for what he calls "creativity". He contends that evolutionary biology is a "materialist philosophy" rather than a "real science with a true empirical foundation" and contrasts a Darwinian vision of life with his God-centered perspective of nature based in the traditional Islamic understanding of life and creation. Nasr contends that evolutionism is one of the cornerstones of the contemporary worldview and has contributed directly to the modern world's degradation of the spiritual significance and sacredness of God's creation, as stated in "sacred scriptures" such as the Torah, the Bible or the Quran.

For Nasr, the modern scientific world is incapable of conceiving that each species emanates from the "immutable world of archetypes", – a subtle world beyond the material world –, by "crystallizing" on earth at "a particular moment in the history of the material cosmos", in accordance to the divine "will". The human being, for example, appeared on earth as a human being.

==== Philosophy ====
Commenting on an article that Muhammad Suheyl Umar dedicated to him, Nasr speaks of his own "philosophical position":

I am a follower of that philosophia perennis and also universalis, that eternal sophia, which has always been and will always be and in whose perspective there is but one Reality which can say "I" [...] I have tried to become transparent before the ray of Truth that shines whenever and wherever the veil before it is lifted or rent asunder. Once that process is achieved, the understanding, "observation" and explication of the manner in which that light shines upon problems of contemporary man constitute for me philosophical creativity in the deepest sense of the term. Otherwise, philosophy becomes sheer mental acrobatics and reason cut off from both the intellect and revelation, nothing but a luciferian instrument leading to dispersion and ultimately dissolution.

For Nasr, the true "love of wisdom" (philosophia) was shared by all civilizations until the emergence, in the West, of a thought which dissociated itself more and more from the spiritual dimension as a result of the occultation of the sapiential core of religion and the divorce of philosophical intelligence from faith. Apart from the case of certain Greek currents such as sophistry and skepticism, as well as the episode of nominalism towards the end of the Middle Ages, it was really during the Renaissance, continues Nasr, that "the separation of philosophy and of revelation" began, despite the maintenance in certain isolated circles of a true spirituality. With the development of individualism and the emergence of rationalism and skepticism, only the purely human faculties – reason and the senses – "determined knowledge, although faith in God still persisted to a certain extent", but that was not enough to hold back "the progressive desacralization of knowledge which characterizes European intellectual history" from this period on and which "led to the completely profane philosophy of today". However, "the very separation of knowledge from being, which lies at the heart of the crisis of modern man is avoided in the Oriental traditions, which consider legitimate only that form of knowledge that can transform the being of the knower".

Adnan Aslan notes a passage from Nasr in which he endorses Plato's commentary in the Phaedo, which equates philosophy with "the practice of death"; this death, for Nasr, corresponds to the extinction of the "I", a necessary stage for the realization of the "Self" (Note: The following extract makes it possible to identify the meaning of the terms "I" – the ego – and "Self" as Nasr understands them: "Man's responsibility to society, the cosmos, and God issues ultimately from himself, not his self as ego but the inner man who is the mirror and reflection of the Supreme Self, the Ultimate Reality which can be envisaged as either pure Subject or pure Object since It transcends in Itself all dualities, being neither subject nor object." Nasr, Knowledge and the Sacred, 2007, p. 149-150.) or of the "Truth".

Several works by Nasr support critical analyzes of those he considers to be engines of modern deviation: Descartes, Montaigne, F. Bacon, Voltaire, Hume, Rousseau, Kant, Comte, Darwin, Marx, Freud, Aurobindo, Teilhard de Chardin and others. In addition, his writings abundantly cite those who, for him, convey authentic wisdom: Pythagoras, Socrates, Plato, Plotinus, Augustine, Shankara, Erigena, Avicenna, al-Bīrūnī, Suhrawardī, Ibn Arabī, Rūmī, Thomas Aquinas, Eckhart, Dante, Mullā Sadrā, Guénon, Schuon, Coomaraswamy, Burckhardt, Lings, etc.

==== Scientism ====
Patrick Laude submits that Nasr is "the only foremost perennialist writer to have received an intensive and advanced academic training in modern sciences" (Note: "Although Guénon was a mathematician of background, he was not directly involved in the study of modern sciences nor did he manifest much interest in going beyond a general critique of modern scientific reductionism. Titus Burckhardt, and to a lesser extent Frithjof Schuon, has left us with remarkably perceptive arguments and analyses against such scientific axioms as macro-evolutionism and the superstition of materialism." Laude, "Seyyed Hossein Nasr in the Context of the Perennialist School" in Beacon of Knowledge: Essays in Honor of Seyyed Hossein Nasr, 2003, p. 6-7.) while Joseph E. B. Lumbard contends that "as a trained scientist", Nasr is well suited to argue about the relationship between religion and science.

Summarizing Nasr's thought, Lucian W. Stone, Jr. writes in The Dictionary of Modern American Philosophers: "According to Nasr, while the traditional sciences – which include biology, cosmology, medicine, philosophy, metaphysics, and so on –, understood the natural phenomena and humanity as vestigia Dei (signs of God), modern science has severed the universe, including humans, from God. The natural world or cosmos has a meaning beyond itself, one of which modern secular science is intentionally ignorant".

Nasr argues that historically Western science is "inextricably linked to Islamic science and before it to the Greco-Alexandrian, Indian, ancient Iranian as well as Mesopotamian and Egyptian sciences". Denying this heritage, the Renaissance already – despite some resistance –, but especially the 17th century (Descartes, Galileo, Kepler, Newton), imposed new paradigms in accordance with the ambient anthropocentrism and rationalism, and with the secularization of the cosmos, which have resulted in a "unilateral and monolithic science, [...] bound to a single level of reality [...], a profoundly terrestrial and externalized science".

While not denying the prowess "of a science limited to the physical dimension of reality", Nasr nonetheless argues that "alternative worldviews drawn from traditional doctrines remain constantly aware of the inner nexus which binds physical nature to the realm of Spirit, and the outward face of things to an inner reality which they at once veil and reveal". For the traditional sciences of all civilizations, the universe is formed by a hierarchy of degrees, the most "external" or "lowest" degree being the physical world, the only one that modern science recognizes; this lower degree reflects the higher degrees of the universe "by means of symbols which have remained an ever open gate towards the Invisible".

Nasr speaks of "certain intuitions and discoveries" of contemporary scientists, "which reveal the Divine Origin of the natural world", a deduction that scientism does not want to admit, "the scientific philosophers are much more dogmatic than many scientists in denying any metaphysical significance to the discoveries of science". Scientism presents "modern science not as a particular way of knowing nature, but as a complete and totalitarian philosophy which reduces all reality to the physical domain and does not wish under any condition to accept the possibility of the existence of non-scientistic worldviews". However, Nasr notes, a large number of eminent physicists "have often been the first to deny scientism and even the so-called scientific method [...], seeking to go beyond the scientific reductionism which has played such a great role in the desacralization of nature and of knowledge itself".

According to Lumbard, Nasr considers that:

Science in and of itself is neutral, and the information that scientific discovery provides is true on its own plane, but science falls into error when it crosses from the realm of scientific investigation into that of scientistic ideology, generalizing and absolutizing a particular vision of the physical domain of the universe that science is able to study and then judging the other disciplines in accord with that narrow vision. [...] Nasr calls for a reintegration of modern science into metaphysics and the traditional cosmological sciences in which knowledge of the level of reality that each discipline is equipped to analyze is perceived through the light of higher forms of knowledge, at the apex of which stands the knowledge of the One before which all is reduced to nothingness.

==== Art ====
In his reflections on art, Seyyed Hossein Nasr bases himself on "the traditional perspective which is by nature meta-historic and perennial". For him, all art "must convey the truth and beauty" and "a meaning that is ultimately universal" because it is independent of "the ego of the individual artist". He cites as examples the traditional art, "whether it be Persian and Arabic in the Islamic world, Japanese and Chinese in the Far East, Hindu and Buddhist in the Indian world, medieval Christian in the West", as well as the arts of the "primal people of the Americas, Australia and Africa, who in a sense, belong to one family". "That art is the reflection of a Platonic paradigm, idea, or archetype, in the Platonic sense, in the world of physical forms."

Thus, in traditional art, specifies Nasr, the artist "is an instrument for the expression of certain symbols, of certain ideas, [...] which are beyond the individual and are executed artistically through traditional techniques" because they belong to the "spiritual world"; "this is where the great difference between traditional and modern art comes from". An art is considered traditional "not because of its subject matter but because of its conformity to cosmic laws of forms, to the laws of symbolism, to the formal genius of the particular spiritual universe in which it has been created, its hieratic style, its conformity to the nature of the material used, and, finally, its conformity to the truth" as expressed by the religious milieu from which it comes.

As for sacred art, "which lies at the heart of traditional art [, it] has a sacramental function and is, like religion itself, at once truth and presence"; it "involves the ritual and cultic practices and practical and operative aspects of the paths of spiritual realization". In a traditional society, says Nasr, one does not distinguish between sacred art and religious art but "in the post-medieval West and also outside of the Western world since the 19th century, in fact wherever you already have had the decadence of the traditional arts", religious art is characterized only by its subject, at the expense of "its means of execution and its [supra-individual] symbolism" which "belong to the suprahuman realm". Today "much of what is called religious art is no longer traditional but individualistic and psychological."

For Nasr, the degeneration of Western art since the Renaissance is the consequence of a "view of man as a purely secular and earthly being". From symbolic as it was, art became more and more naturalistic, as can be seen, for example, by comparing the sculptures of Chartres Cathedral to those of Michelangelo, or paintings of the Virgin by Raphael to those of the Middle Ages. But, tired of indefinitely reproducing beings and objects deprived of life, naturalism faded in the second half of the 19th century in front of "this new very ingenious wave of impressionist art which tries to capture some of the qualities of nature […] using light and colors [...], without simply emulating the external forms of nature". This movement, however, was only a "transient phase, and soon the whole world of form broke down from below, [...] starting with Picasso and continuing to our own day". The "cracks in the confines of the solidified mindset created by centuries of humanism, rationalism and empiricism" have opened access to the most "inferior" influences.

According to Nasr, most modern artists "become completely enmeshed in their own egos [...], leading lives which are in many cases not morally disciplined, whereas the traditional perspective", on the contrary, "seeks to free us through spiritual discipline [...] destroying the stranglehold that the lower ego has upon our immortal soul". The traditional artist "does not try to express his own feelings and ideas", as the modern artist does; "Art for art's sake" is not his credo, nor is "innovation, originality and creativity" because, unlike the modern artist, he knows that art has as its goal "the attainment of inner perfection and [...] human need[s] in the deepest sense [...], which are spiritual", intimately linked to "beauty and the truth." "All beauty", writes Nasr, "is a reflection of Divine Beauty and can lead to the Source of that reflection"; but the contemporary rubs shoulders with "ugliness, unaware that the need for beauty is as profound in the human being as the [...] air that we breathe".

For Nasr, there are artists in the present day, rooted in a true spirituality and who express it or attempt to express it in their art, with the humility demanded by "light of the truth and the millennial heritage of traditional art, most of which was produced […] by anonymous artists who humbled themselves before the reality of the Spirit and through their transparency were able to reflect the light of the spiritual world in their works".

== Awards and honors ==
- In 2000, a volume was devoted to him in the Library of Living Philosophers.
- Templeton Religion and Science Award (1999)
- First Muslim and first non-Western scholar to deliver the prestigious Gifford Lectures.
- Honorary Doctor from the Faculty of Theology of Uppsala University, Sweden (1977)
- In 1977, La Perse, pont de Turquoise ('Persia, the turquoise bridge'), which he co-authored with Roloff Beny won the Prix Charles Blanc of the Académie Française.

== Works ==
Nasr is the author of over fifty books and five hundred articles (a number of which can be found in the journal, Studies in Comparative Religion) Seyyed Hossein Nasr Author Page on topics such as Traditionalist metaphysics, Islamic science, religion and the environment, Sufism, and Islamic philosophy. He has written works in Persian, English, French, Arabic and Indonesian. Listed below are most of Nasr's works in English (in chronological order), including translations, edited volumes, and Festschriften in his honor:

As author

- An Introduction to Islamic Cosmological Doctrines: Conceptions of Nature and Methods Used for Its Study by the Ikhwan al-Safa, al-Biruni, and Ibn Sina (1964)
- Three Muslim Sages: Avicenna—Suhrawardi—Ibn Arabi (1964)
- Ideals and Realities of Islam (1966)
- Science and Civilization in Islam, with a preface by Giorgio de Santillana (1968)
- Islamic Studies: Essays on Law and Society, the Sciences, and Philosophy and Sufism (1967)
- The Encounter of Man and Nature: The Spiritual Crisis of Modern Man (1968)
- Sufi Essays (1972)
- Islam and the Plight of Modern Man (1975)
- Islamic Science: An Illustrated Study, with photographs by Roland Michaud (1976)
- Sadr al-Din Shirazi and His Transcendent Theosophy: Background, Life and Works, 2nd edition (1977)
- Knowledge and the Sacred (The Gifford Lectures). State University of New York Press. 1989. ISBN 978-0-7914-0177-4. Download KNOWLEDGE AND THE SACRED
- Islamic Life and Thought (1981)
- Islamic Art and Spirituality (1986)
- Traditional Islam in the Modern World (1987)
- Man and Nature: The Spiritual Crisis in Modern Man. Kazi. 1991. ISBN 978-1871031652.
- A Young Muslim's Guide to the Modern World (1993)
- The Need for a Sacred Science. State University of New York Press. 1993. ISBN 978-0-7914-1518-4.
- The Islamic Intellectual Tradition in Persia, edited by Mehdi Aminrazavi (1994)
- Muhammad: Man of God (1995)
- Religion and the Order of Nature (The 1994 Cadbury Lectures at the University of Birmingham). Oxford University Press, USA. 1996. ISBN 978-0195108231.
- Islam: Religion, History, and Civilization (2001)
- The Heart of Islam: Enduring Values for Humanity (2002), Free Download
- Islamic Philosophy from its Origin to the Present: Philosophy in the Land of Prophecy (2006)
- The Garden of Truth: The Vision and Promise of Sufism, Islam's Mystical Tradition. HarperOne. 2008. ISBN 978-0061625992.
- Chittick, William, ed. (2007). The Essential Seyyed Hossein Nasr. World Wisdom. ISBN 978-1933316383.
- Islam in the Modern World (2012)

Poetry

- Poems of the Way; put to music by Sami Yusuf in Songs of the Way (vol. 1) (1999)
- The Pilgrimage of Life and the Wisdom of Rumi: Poems and Translations (2007)

As editor

- An Annotated Bibliography of Islamic Science, edited with William Chittick and Peter Zirnis (3 vols., 1975)
- Isma'ili Contributions to Islamic Culture (1977)
- The Essential Frithjof Schuon (1986)
- Shi'ism: Doctrines, Thought, and Spirituality, edited with Seyyed Vali Reza Nasr and Hamid Dabashi (1988)
- Expectation of the Millennium: Shi'ism in History, edited with Seyyed Vali Reza Nasr and Hamid Dabashi (1989)
- Islamic Spirituality (Vol. 1: Foundations, 1987; Vol. 2: Manifestations, 1990)
- Religion of the Heart: Essays Presented to Frithjof Schuon on his Eightieth Birthday, edited with William Stoddart (1991)
- In Quest of the Sacred: The Modern World in the Light of Tradition, edited with Katherine O'Brien (1994)
- History of Islamic Philosophy, edited with Oliver Leaman (1995)
- Mecca the Blessed, Medina the Radiant: The Holiest Cities of Islam, photographs by Kazuyoshi Nomachi; essay by Seyyed Hossein Nasr (1997)
- An Anthology of Philosophy in Persia, edited with Mehdi Aminrazavi (5 vols., 1st in 1999)
- The Essential Sophia, edited with Katherine O'Brien (2006)
- The Study Quran (Editor-in-Chief); Caner Dagli, Maria Dakake, and Joseph Lumbard (General editors); Mohammed Rustom (Assistant editor) (2015)

As translator

- Shi'ite Islam by Sayyid Muhammad Husayn Tabataba'i
- The Book of Metaphysical Penetrations by Mulla Sadra (edited, introduced, and annotated by Ibrahim Kalin)

Works about Nasr

- The Works of Seyyed Hossein Nasr Through His Fortieth Birthday, edited by William Chittick
- Knowledge is Light: Essays in Honor of Seyyed Hossein Nasr, edited by Zailan Moris
- Beacon of Knowledge – Essays in Honor of Seyyed Hossein Nasr, edited by Mohammad Faghfoory
- Islam, Modernity, and the Human Sciences (second part of the book), by Ali Zaidi
- Religious Pluralism in Christian and Islamic Philosophy: The Thought of John Hick and Seyyed Hossein Nasr, by Adnan Aslan
- From the Pen of Seyyed Hossein Nasr: A Bibliography of His Works Through His Eightieth Year, edited by Nicholas Boylston, Oludamini Ogunnaike, and Syed A.H. Zaidi
- Islam and Modernity: Dissecting the Thought of Seyyed Hossein Nasr: A Discourse on the Compatibility or Incompatibility of Islam with Modernity (Lap Lambert Academic Publishing, 2011) by Musa Yusuf Owoyemi
- Thinking Between Islam and the West: The Thoughts of Seyyed Hossein Nasr, Bassam Tibi and Tariq Ramadan by Chi-chung (Andy) Yu
- Traditional Islamic Environmentalism: The Vision of Seyyed Hossein Nasr (University Press of America, 2013) by Tarik M. Quadir

Interviews

Books

- Iqbal, Muzaffar (2009). Islam, Science, Muslims, and Technology. Islamabad: Dost. ISBN 978-0-9738744-2-6.
- Jahanbegloo, Ramin (2010). In Search of the Sacred: A Conversation with Seyyed Hossein Nasr on His Life and Thought. Santa Barbara, CA: Praeger. ISBN 978-0-31338-324-3.
- El-Zein, Amira (2025). Return to the Eternal Abode: Sufi Dialogues with Seyyed Hossein Nasr. Albany, NY: State University of New York Press. ISBN 979-885580077-7.

Articles

- Bob Abernethy (Religion & Ethics Newsweekly) (7 February 2003). "Seyyed Hossein Nasr on Islam". PBS.
- Bob Abernethy (Religion & Ethics Newsweekly) (7 February 2003). "Seyyed Hossein Nasr Extended Interview". PBS.
- Michael Barnes Norton (Journal of Philosophy & Scripture, Islamic Cultural Center of Northern California) (Autumn 2004). "Scripture, Society, and Traditional Wisdom: An Interview with Seyyed Hossein Nasr".
- "On the Question of Biological Origins" (PDF). Islam & Science. 4 (2): 181–197. Winter 2006.
- Kaleem Hussain (Muslim Heritage) (26 May 2009). "Interview with Prof. Seyyed Hossein Nasr"..
- Mustafa Tabanli (The Fountain Magazine) (May 2009). "On Nature, Beauty, and Transcendence: An Interview with Seyyed Hossein Nasr".
- Kahteran, Nevad (July 2009). "Interviews with the Precursors of Knowledge: The Interview with Professor Seyyed Hossein Nasr". Katha. Journal of the Centre for Civilisational Dialogue, University of Malaya. 5: 69–77.
- Islam & Science Journal (Summer 2010). "Islamic Pedagogy: An Interview".
- Speranskaya, Natella (2013). "Interview with Seyyed Hossein Nasr".
- "Interview with Seyyed Hossein Nasr on Religion & the Environment". Newsletter Georgetown University, Qatar. 15: 1 + 8–11. Autumn 2013.
- Ali Lakhani (The Sacred Web Conference, Vancouver) (27 April 2014). "Dr. Seyyed Hossein Nasr: Interview".
- Colin Christopher (Islamic Cultural Center of Northern California) (November 2016). "Interview with Sufi Scholar, Dr. Seyyed Hossein Nasr".
- Sahil Badruddin (Boniuk Institute for Religious Tolerance) (Autumn 2019). "Role of Thinking in Islam: Past, Present, and Future".

== Influence in Popular Culture ==
Excerpts of a 2003 lecture by Nasr titled "In the Beginning Was Consciousness" at the Harvard Divinity School was sampled by Scottish electronic music duo Boards of Canada in their 2026 song "Prophecy at 1420 MHz".

== See also ==
- Brethren of Purity
- Ecotheology
- Religion and environmentalism
- Sufi studies
- Elémire Zolla
- Ibn Arabi
- James Cutsinger
- Jean-Louis Michon
- Hadi Sabzavari
- Reza Shah-Kazemi
- Philip Sherrard
- Wolfgang Smith
- William Stoddart

== Notes ==
Academic offices
Preceded by Mohammad Reza Amin	Chancellor of Sharif University of Technology; 1972–1975	Succeeded by Mehdi Zarghamee
