= Caner Dagli =

American Islamic scholar

- Born: Caner Dagli

Academic background
- Education: Cornell University, George Washington University, Princeton University
- Influences: Seyyed Hossein Nasr

Academic work
- Institutions: College of the Holy Cross
- Notable works: The Study Quran; Ibn al-‘Arabī and Islamic Intellectual Culture: From Mysticism to Philosophy

Caner K. Dagli (Adyghe: Къушъхьэ Джанэр) is a Turkish Circassian-American Islamic scholar and associate professor of Religious Studies at the College of the Holy Cross in Worcester, Massachusetts.

== Biography ==
Dagli is of Karachay and Circassian origin and was born in the United States to parents who migrated from Turkey. His father was born in the Caucasus and his mother was born in Turkey to the diaspora. He graduated from Cornell University with a B.A. in Near Eastern studies and completed his M.A in religion with special emphasis on Islam from George Washington University. He received his PhD in Near Eastern Studies from Princeton University. From 2005 to 2008, he served as an assistant professor at Roanoke College in Salem, Virginia and was an advisor for interfaith affairs to the Royal Hashemite Court of Jordan from 2006 to 2007. As a Muslim, Dagli was a signatory to the open letter, A Common Word Between Us and You.

== Works ==
- The Ringstones of Wisdoms (Translator) (Great Books of the Islamic World Series, 2004)
- The Oxford Encyclopedia of Philosophy, Science, and Technology in Islam (ed.) (2014)
- The Study Quran: A New Translation and Commentary (Translator, commentary writer and general editor) (2015) with Seyyed Hossein Nasr (editor-in-chief), Joseph E. B. Lumbard, Maria Massi Dakake and Mohammed Rustom.
- Ibn al-‘Arabī and Islamic Intellectual Culture: From Mysticism to Philosophy (2016)
- Metaphysical Institutions: Islam and the Modern Project (SUNY Press 2024)

== See also ==
- William Chittick
- İbrahim Kalın
- Waleed El-Ansary
