= The Encounter of Man and Nature =

1968 book by Seyyed Hossein Nasr

The Encounter of Man and Nature: The Spiritual Crisis of Modern Man is a 1968 book by the Iranian philosopher Seyyed Hossein Nasr.

== See also ==
- Religion and the Order of Nature

== Sources ==
- Pringle, K.E. (1968). "The Encounter Of Man and Nature". Studies in Comparative Religion. 2 (3).
- Mascall, E. L. (1970). "Seyyed Hossein Nasr. The Encounter of Man and Nature. The Spiritual Crisis of Modern Man". Religious Studies. 6 (1). Cambridge University Press (CUP): 103–104. doi:10.1017/s0034412500000123. ISSN 0034-4125.
- O'More, Haven (1970). "The Encounter of Man and Nature. The Spiritual Crisis of Modern Man". Aperture. 15 (2 [58]). [Princeton University Art Museum, Aperture Foundation, Inc.] ISSN 0003-6420. JSTOR 24471556.
- van Ess, Josef (1969). "The Encounter of Man and Nature. The Spiritual Crisis of Modern Man". Die Welt des Islams. 12 (4). JSTOR: 246. doi:10.2307/1569702.
- Riepe, Dale (1969). "The Encounter of Man and Nature". Journal of the American Oriental Society. 89 (1). JSTOR: 301. doi:10.2307/598352.
