= Expectation of the Millennium =

Book on Shia Islam

Expectation of the Millennium: Shi'ism in History is a book on Shia Islam co-written by Seyyed Hossein Nasr, Hamid Dabashi and Seyyed Vali Reza Nasr.

== Reviews ==
- Danner, Victor (1991), "Reviewed Work: Expectation of the Millennium: Shi'ism in History by Seyyed Hossein Nasr, Hamid Dabashi, Seyyed Vali Reza Nasr", Journal of Asian History, 25 (1), Harrassowitz Verlag: 72–74, JSTOR 41930793
- Arkoun, Mohammed (1989), "Reviewed Work: Expectation of the Millennium, Shi'ism in History by Seyyed Hossein NASR, Hamid DABASHI, Seyyed Vali Reza NASR", Archives de sciences sociales des religions, 34 (68.2), École des hautes études en sciences sociales: 278–279, JSTOR 41623560
- Sells, Michael (1991), "Reviewed Work: Expectation of the Millennium: Shi'ism in History by Seyyed Hossein Nasr, Hamid Dabashi, Seyyed Vali Reza Nasr", The Journal of Religion, 71 (2), The University of Chicago Press: 298–299, doi:10.1086/488638, JSTOR 1204793
- Zysow, Aron (1990), "Reviewed Works: Shi'ism: Doctrines, Thought, and Spirituality by Seyyed Hossein Nasr, Hamid Dabashi, Seyyed Vali Reza Nasr; Expectation of the Millennium: Shi'ism in History by Seyyed Hossein Nasr, Hamid Dabashi, Seyyed Vali Reza Nasr", Iranian Studies, 23 (1/4), Taylor & Francis, Ltd. on behalf of International Society of Iranian Studies: 151–155, doi:10.1017/S0021086200013670, JSTOR 4310748
