= Mehdi Aminrazavi =

Iranian Scholar

Mehdi Aminrazavi (born September 22, 1957) is an Iranian scholar of philosophy and mysticism. He is the Kurt Leidecker Chair in Asian Studies and a professor of philosophy and religion as well as director of the Center for Middle Eastern Studies Program at the University of Mary Washington.

== Biography ==
Born in Mashhad, Iran, Aminrazavi studied at the University of Washington in Seattle and received his bachelor's degree in Architecture and city planning and a master's in philosophy. He then transferred to Temple University where he received his master's in religious studies and a Ph.D. in philosophy of religion. He has been teaching at the University of Mary Washington since 1990.

== Affiliations ==
Aminrazavi is a member of a number of prestigious national and international philosophical and religious organizations including the American Academy of Religion, the American Philosophical Association and the Middle Eastern Society of America.

== Works ==
- Philosophy, Religion and the Question of Intolerance (1997)
- Suhrawardi and the School of Illumination (1997)
- Philosophy, Religion, and the Question of Intolerance (1997) with David Ambuel
- An Anthology of Philosophy in Persia with Seyyed Hossein Nasr
- The Islamic Intellectual Tradition in Persia (1996) with Seyyed Hossein Nasr
- The Wine Of Wisdom: The Life, Work, And The Legacy Of Omar Khayyam (2005)
- Islamic Philosophy & Theology: An Online Textbook for Colleges (2010).
