= Vali Nasr =

Iranian-American academic and political scientist (born 1960)

Seyyed Vali Nasr
- ولی‌رضا نصر
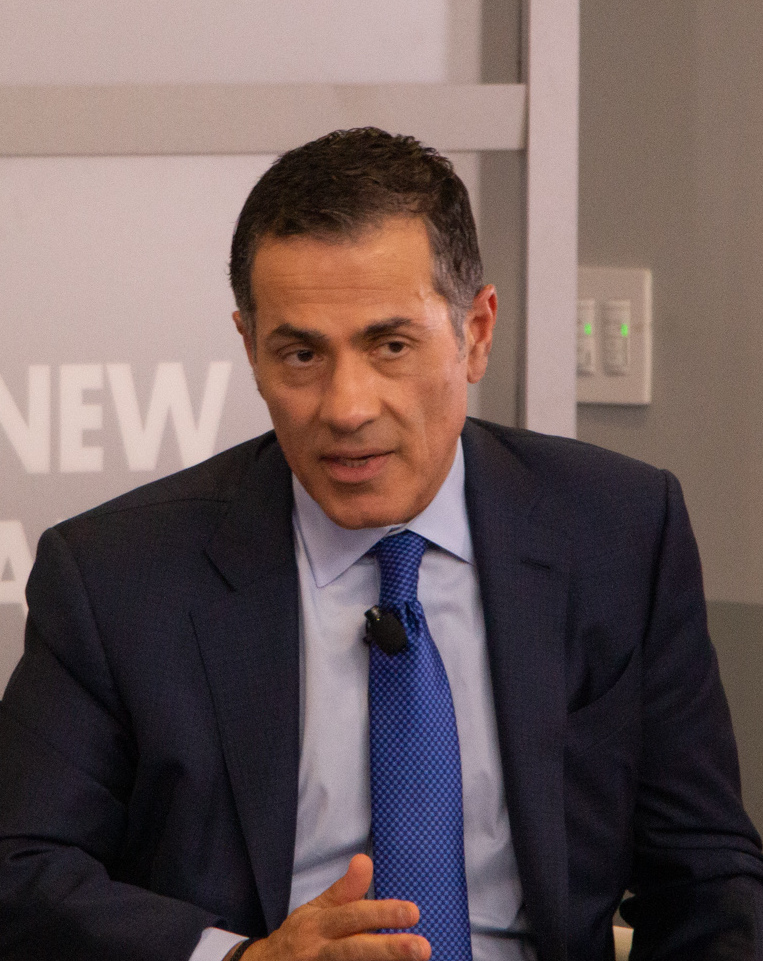
- Nasr in 2020

8th Dean of the Paul H. Nitze School of Advanced International Studies
- In office 1 July 2012 – 14 June 2019
- Preceded by: Jessica Einhorn
- Succeeded by: Eliot A. Cohen

Personal details
- Pronunciation: [vǽliː ɹezɒː næsɹ]
- Born: Seyyed Vali Reza Nasr; 20 December 1960 (age 65) Tehran, Imperial State of Iran
- Children: 3
- Parent: Seyyed Hossein Nasr (father)
- Education: Tufts University (BA, MA); Massachusetts Institute of Technology (PhD)
- Awards: Ellis Island Medal of Honor

Seyyed Vali Reza Nasr (Note: Persian pronunciation: [vǽliː ɹezɒː næsɹ].) (Persian: ولی‌رضا نصر, pronounced [vǽliː ɹezɒː næsɹ]; born 20 December 1960) is an Iranian-American academic and political scientist, specializing in Middle Eastern studies and the history of Islam. He is Majid Khaddouri Professor of International Affairs and Middle East Studies at the Johns Hopkins School of Advanced International Studies (SAIS) in Washington, D.C. He served as the eighth dean of the school from 2012 to 2019.

Nasr is also a non-resident senior adviser at the Center for Strategic and International Studies, and has been described by The Economist as "a leading world authority on Shia Islam".

== Biography ==
Vali Nasr, son of the Iranian academic, philosopher, and scholar of religion Seyyed Hossein Nasr, was born in Tehran, Imperial State of Iran in 1960. He went to school in England at age 16, and immigrated to the United States after the Islamic Revolution in Iran (1979).

He received his B.A. degree from Tufts University in international relations summa cum laude. He earned his M.A. degree in international economics and Middle Eastern studies from the Fletcher School of Law and Diplomacy in 1984, then went on to earn his doctorate in political science from the MIT School of Humanities, Arts, and Social Sciences in 1991.

== Career ==
He taught at the Fletcher School of Law and Diplomacy of Tufts University, University of San Diego, and the Naval Postgraduate School, and was a senior fellow at the Belfer Center at Harvard University, as well as Stanford University and University of California, San Diego prior to being appointed dean of the Johns Hopkins School of Advanced International Studies in March 2012.

Nasr was a member of the State Department's Foreign Affairs Policy Board and served as senior advisor to the U.S. special representative for Afghanistan, Ambassador Richard Holbrooke, between 2009 and 2011. He is a Life Member of the Council on Foreign Relations.

== Ideas and public philosophy ==
Nasr views that divides between Sunni and Shia Muslims are more important to the Muslim world than the Muslim world's differences with the West. He views that the Shia minority are on an upward path in order to challenge the Sunni majority represented by Saudi Arabia among over countries.

He views economic prosperity in the Muslim world as an agent of change which will increase stability and decrease extremism and terrorism.

He has written how Iran's geopolitical goals are focused on national security, protecting its people, building alliances with Arab countries, and building nuclear weapons.

=== Publications ===
Nasr is a political scientist by training and has focused on comparative politics and international relations of the Middle East. He is the author of several monographs on the study of Middle Eastern politics and societies, including The Vanguard of the Islamic Revolution: The Jama`at-i Islami of Pakistan (1994), Mawdudi and the Making of Islamic Revivalism (1997), The Islamic Leviathan (2001), Democracy in Iran (written with Ali Gheissari, 2006), The Shia Revival: How Conflicts Within Islam Will Shape the Future (2006), Meccanomics: The March of the New Muslim Middle Class (2010), Forces of Fortune: The Rise of the New Muslim Middle Class and What It will Mean for Our World (2010), and The Dispensable Nation: American Foreign Policy in Retreat (2013).

Nasr's writing has addressed politics and Islamic activism in Afghanistan, Iran, Pakistan, and throughout the Arab world. He has highlighted the role of states in the process of Islamization throughout the history of the Middle East and the importance of sectarian identity in Middle-Eastern politics, including the growing importance of Shīʿa Islam and its relation to the politics of Iran and other Middle-Eastern countries following the Islamic Revolution in Iran (1978–1979) and the Iraq War (2003–2011). His book Forces of Fortune: The Rise of the New Muslim Middle Class and What It will Mean for Our World (2010) focused on the importance of a new middle class for the future of the Muslim world. He appeared on The Daily Show with Jon Stewart on 1 August 2006, 22 September 2009, and 25 April 2013. Due to the accuracy of his political predictions Nasr has been hailed as a "shrewd forecaster."

== Personal life ==
Nasr is the son of Seyyed Hossein Nasr, a prominent Iranian academic, philosopher, and scholar of religion. He is married to a technology executive. They have two sons and one daughter.

== Publications ==
- Iran's Grand Strategy: A Political History (Princeton University Press, 20 May 2025)
- Dispensable Nation: American Foreign Policy in Retreat (Doubleday, 2013)
- Forces of Fortune: The Rise of the New Muslim Middle Class and What It will Mean for Our World (Free Press, 2009), also published under the titles The Rise of Islamic Capitalism: Why the New Middle Class is Key to Defeating Extremism and Meccanomics: The March of the New Muslim Middle Class in the U.K.
- The Shia Revival: How Conflicts Within Islam will Shape the Future (W.W. Norton & Company, 2006)
- Democracy in Iran: History and the Quest for Liberty (coauthor, Oxford University Press, 2006)
- The Islamic Leviathan: Islam and the Making of State Power (Oxford University Press, 2001)
- Mawdudi and the Making of Islamic Revivalism (Oxford University Press, 1996)
- The Vanguard of the Islamic Revolution: The Jama`at-i Islami of Pakistan (University of California Press, 1994)[7]
- Oxford Dictionary of Islam (editor, Oxford University Press, 2003)
- Expectation of the Millennium: Shi'ism in History (coeditor, State University of New York Press, 1989)
- The Arab Moment Has Passed from Foreign Policy
- The Impact of the Pandemic on Geopolitical in the MENA Region from in Navigating the Pandemic: The Challenge of Stability and Prosperity in the Mediterranean MED
- A Nuclear Deal Won’t Secure the Middle East, But Regional Cooperation Could, and Washington Should Support It from Foreign Affairs
- Iran Among the Ruins: Tehran’s Advantage in a Turbulent Middle East from Foreign Affairs
- Business, Not As Usual from Finance and Development
- When Shiites Rise from Foreign Affairs
- "The Cost of Containing Iran" (coauthored with Ray Takeyh) from Foreign Affairs
- "Who Wins in Iraq? Iran" from Foreign Policy
- "The Rise of Muslim Democracy" from Journal of Democracy
- "The Conservative Consolidation in Iran" from Survival
- "The Regional Implications of Shi'a Revival in Iraq" from The Washington Quarterly
- "Iran’s Peculiar Election: The Conservative Wave Rolls On" from Journal of Democracy
- "The Democracy Debate in Iran" (coauthor) from Middle East Policy Journal
- "Military Rule, Islamism, and Democracy in Pakistan" from The Middle East Journal
- "Lessons from the Muslim World" from Dædalus

== See also ==
- List of Iranian Americans
- Middle Eastern studies
- Political aspects of Islam
- Politics of Iran
