= The Study Quran =

2015 English-language Quran translation

- Cover for the first edition.
- Editors: Seyyed Hossein Nasr, Caner Dagli, Maria Massi Dakake, Joseph Lumbard, Mohammed Rustom
- Language: English
- Publisher: HarperOne
- Publication date: 2015
- Publication place: United States
- Pages: 2048

The Study Quran: A New Translation and Commentary (TSQ) is a 2015 English-language edition of the Quran edited by Seyyed Hossein Nasr and published by HarperOne. Fellow Muslims Joseph Lumbard, Caner Dagli and Maria Massi Dakake, prepared the translation, wrote the commentary, and also served as general editors, and Mohammed Rustom contributed as an assistant editor by checking the translation and writing some of the commentary. Alongside a new English translation and extensive commentary, The Study Quran features numerous essays, maps, and other material.

== Development ==
The idea of an English-language Quran for scholars and students was originally proposed to Nasr by HarperOne (then HarperSanFrancisco), who wanted Nasr as the editor-in-chief. Nasr initially declined, but after the publisher told him that the book would not happen without him, he felt obligated to lead the project. Nasr had several conditions for the work: firstly, that it would avoid modernistic and fundamentalist interpretations of the Quran, instead favouring a range of traditional interpretations. He also insisted that all the editors would be Muslim. Nasr chose Dagli, Dakake, and Lumbard, all Americans and former students of his, as General Editors. Sections of the translation and commentary were apportioned to the three editors, who worked under the oversight of Nasr and in consultation with each other to preserve the unity of the project. Nasr recruited Rustom as an assistant editor after the translation and essays had been completed. The Study Quran took ten years to complete.

== Content ==
On The Study Quran's English translation, Nasr writes:

We have sought to make use of the full possibilities of the English language without the pretext of wanting to be so up-to-date in word usages that our rendition would soon become out-of-date. We have also sought to be as eloquent as possible, in an effort to reflect something of the inimitable eloquence of Quranic Arabic.

The Study Quran's commentary makes use of at least 41 traditional commentaries that represent a variety of Islamic perspectives, including Sunni and Shiite sources among them linguistic, philosophical, mystical, and historical commentaries. The book provides analysis and thorough summary of them, including in it disagreements between commentators. Its primary value has been characterized as it giving an English-speaking audience access to important commentaries which are in Persian and Arabic in a single manuscript, despite the commentaries sometimes spanning tens of volumes. It is the first edition of the Quran to combine commentaries with disparate and often conflicting interpretations in this way. The source commentaries are traditional rather than contemporary, and are dominated by Medieval works; the most recent commentators are Ibn Ashur and Tabataba'i, who both died in the 20th century.

The book also includes 15 essays written on related topics, including "How to Read the Quran", "The Quran as Source of Islamic Law", and "Conquest and Conversion, War and Peace in the Quran". The essay topics were selected by Nasr and written by a variety of contributors.

== Reception ==
The Study Quran, according to Bahar Davary, is a "great resource for students and scholars in the fields of theology and religious studies and can be a useful reference in other fields of the humanities." Mobeen Vaid praises the Study Quran as "a monumental contribution to the field of Quran studies". In a review of the book, Bruce Lawrence said: "No one will be able to offer a basic course on Islam, or to propose an in depth study of the Quran, without reference to this monumental achievement by a team of devoted scholars".

Faraz Rabbani called The Study Quran a “deep, rich, valuable study companion for any English-speaker seeking to deepen their understanding and appreciation for the Book of Allah”, but warned readers not to “take it as “the final word” or an authoritative reference on matters of theology or law”.

Appraisal by mainstream American publications focused on The Study Quran's capacity to counter extreme or fundamentalist interpretations of Islam. A report by CNN entitled “Could this Quran curb extremism?” placed the work in the context of the recent Paris attacks, emphasising that the book refutes the extremist interpretations of the Quran by ISIS and other groups. Similarly, an article in The Daily Beast presented The Study Quran as a “challenge” to the ultra-conservative Salafi scholars who “have monopolized English-language Muslim resources”.
