= Science and Civilization in Islam =

1968 book by Seyyed Hossein Nasr

Science and Civilization in Islam is a 1968 book by the Iranian philosopher Seyyed Hossein Nasr.

== Sources ==
- Heer, Nicholas (1968). "Science and Civilization in Islam. Seyyed Hossein Nasr". Isis. 59 (4). University of Chicago Press: 449–451. doi:10.1086/350435. ISSN 0021-1753.
- Baumer, William H. (1971). "Science and civilization in Islam". Studies in History and Philosophy of Science Part A. 2 (2). Elsevier BV: 183–190. doi:10.1016/0039-3681(71)90032-x. ISSN 0039-3681.
- Peters, F. E. (1969). "Science and Civilization in Islam". The American Historical Review. Oxford University Press (OUP): 1049–1050. doi:10.1086/ahr/74.3.1049. ISSN 1937-5239.
- Molland, A. G. (1969). "Islam - Science and Civilization in Islam". The British Journal for the History of Science. 4 (4). Cambridge University Press (CUP): 416. doi:10.1017/s0007087400010438. ISSN 0007-0874.
- Caldarini, S. (1988). "Seyyed Hossein Nasr: Science and civilization in Islam". Bulletin of the School of Oriental and African Studies. 51 (3). Cambridge University Press (CUP): 621. doi:10.1017/s0041977x00117379. ISSN 0041-977X. S2CID 163097161.
