= A Young Muslim's Guide to the Modern World =

1993 book by Seyyed Hossein Nasr

A Young Muslim's Guide to the Modern World is a 1993 book by the Iranian philosopher Seyyed Hossein Nasr.

== Sources ==
- Marshall, David; Bahron, Badrul Amin; Bone, Amra; Azumah, John (1994). "Review article: A Young Muslim's Guide to the Modern World". Islam and Christian–Muslim Relations. 5 (1). Informa UK Limited: 75–81. doi:10.1080/09596419408721023. ISSN 0959-6410.
- Eaton, Gai (1994). "Reflection on THE NEED FOR A SACRED SCIENCE and A YOUNG MUSLIM'S GUIDE TO THE MODERN WORLD". Islamic Quarterly. 38 (2). Informa UK Limited: 133.
- Galford, Hugh S. (1995). "A Young Muslim's Guide to the Modern World". British Journal of Middle Eastern Studies. 22 (1/2). Taylor & Francis, Ltd.: 146–148. JSTOR 195976.
