= Islam in the Modern World =

2012 book by Seyyed Hossein Nasr

Islam in the Modern World: Challenged by the West, Threatened by Fundamentalism, Keeping Faith with Tradition is a 2012 book by the Iranian philosopher Seyyed Hossein Nasr.

== Sources ==
- Markwith, Zachary (2010). "Review: Seyyed Hossein Nasr, Islam in the Modern World: Challenged by the West, Threatened by Fundamentalism, Keeping Faith with Tradition". Sacred Web. 28 (1): 103–116.
- Mrahorovic, Senad (2012). "Seyyed Hossien Nasr, Islam in the Modern World: Changed by the West, Threatened by Fundamentalism, Keeping Faith with Tradition". ICR Journal. 3 (2). International Institute of Advanced Islamic Studies (IAIS) Malaysia: 409–410. doi:10.52282/icr.v3i2.571. ISSN 2041-8728.
