= Iran's Grand Strategy =

2025 book

Iran's Grand Strategy: A Political History
- Cover of the 2025 Princeton University Press edition
- Author: Vali Nasr
- Language: English
- Subject: Contemporary history of Iran
- Genre: History
- Published: 2025
- Publisher: Princeton University Press
- Dewey Decimal: 327.5500904
- LC Class: DS318.83 .N387 2025

Iran's Grand Strategy: A Political History is a nonfiction book by Vali Nasr that was published in 2025 by Princeton University Press. This book explains how Iran's "grand strategy of resistance" evolved into "forward defense" after 2003—driven by pragmatism more than ideology, yet costly and now losing popular support at home.

== Summary ==
This book, which was published in 2025 in about 400 pages by Princeton University Press, in 11 chapters traces how Iran's "grand strategy of resistance" took shape, seeking its roots in the Safavid fusion of Persian identity and Shiism, Qajar humiliations, and Pahlavi state-building before focusing on 1979–2024. It argues the Iran-Iraq War forged the "sacred defense" mindset, which evolved after 2003 into "forward defense"—projecting power through proxies across the Arab world. In the author's view, Iran's leaders pursued this not out of pure ideology and religious zeal but with a pragmatic logic aimed at securing the country. Yet despite regional successes, it has come at immense cost, and the state built on resistance is now losing the support of its own people.

== Reception ==
Critics praised the book as timely and noted that it offers a fresh perspective on its subject. They also highlighted its use of lesser-known sources, and commended its deep analysis and compelling narrative.
