= In Search of the Sacred: A Conversation with Seyyed Hossein Nasr on His Life and Thought =

2010 book by Seyyed Hossein Nasr

In Search of the Sacred: A Conversation with Seyyed Hossein Nasr on His Life and Thought is a 2010 book about the life and thought of the Iranian philosopher Seyyed Hossein Nasr.

== Sources ==
- MacDonald, Matthew A. (2011). "Seyyed Hossein Nasr with Ramin Jahanbegloo, In Search of the Sacred". American Journal of Islam and Society. 28 (1). International Institute of Islamic Thought: 132–135. doi:10.35632/ajis.v28i1.1271. ISSN 2690-3741.
- Mirtaheri, S. Amir (2012). "In Search of the Sacred: A Conversation with Seyyed Hossein Nasr on his Life and Thought". Iranian Studies. 45 (4). Cambridge University Press (CUP): 590–592. doi:10.1080/00210862.2012.673837. ISSN 0021-0862. S2CID 170088932.
- Dagli, Caner (2014). "In Search of the Sacred: A Conversation with Seyyed Hossein Nasr on His Life and Thought By Ramin Jahanbegloo". The Muslim World. 104 (1–2). Wiley: 225–227. doi:10.1111/muwo.12048. ISSN 0027-4909.
- Lakhani, Ali (2010). "In Search of the Sacred: A Conversation with Seyyed Hossein Nasr on His Life and Thought". Sacred Web. 26: 193–199.
