= Marietta Stepanyants =

Russian philosopher (born 1935)

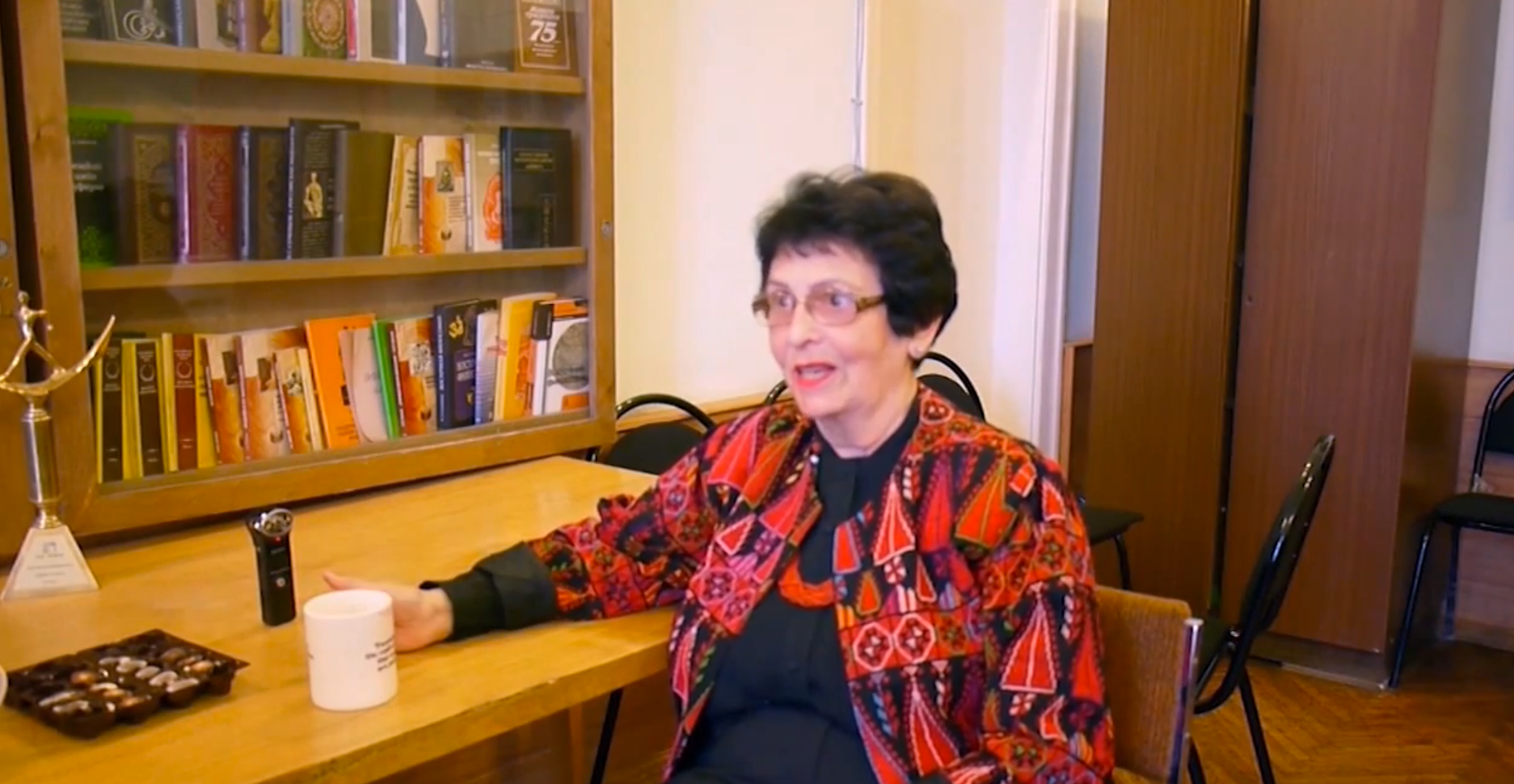
- Stepanyants in December 2014
- Born: October 16, 1935 (age 90); Moscow, RSFSR, USSR

Education
- Education: Moscow State Institute of International Relations; Institute of Philosophy, Russian Academy of Sciences (PhD, D.Sc.)

Philosophical work
- Institutions: UNESCO; Diplomatic Academy of the Ministry of Foreign Affairs of the Russian Federation; Institute of Philosophy, Russian Academy of Sciences
- Notable works: Introduction to Eastern Thought
- Marietta Stepanyants's voice Recorded 7 May 2013

Marietta Stepanyants (born October 16, 1935) is a Russian philosopher, the founder and the Chairholder of the UNESCO Chair in “Philosophy in the Dialogue of Cultures” and the Chief Research Fellow at the Institute of Philosophy, Russian Academy of Sciences. She is an Honored Scholar of the Russian Federation and an active member of the Academy of Humanities since 1995.

== Biography ==
Marietta Stepanyants was born in Moscow on October 16, 1935. She graduated from the Faculty of Oriental Studies of the Moscow State Institute of International Relations in 1959. She received a PhD in philosophy in 1963 and a DSc in 1974 from the Institute of Philosophy of the USSR. From 1980 to 1994, she served as Professor of the Diplomatic Academy of the USSR (now the Russian Federation). Since 1995, she has been a professor at the State Academic University of the Humanities. Currently, she is the head of the Center for Oriental Philosophy of the Institute of Philosophy of the Russian Academy of Sciences.

== Works ==
=== Books ===
- Introduction to Eastern Thought. Walnut Creek-Lanham-New York-Oxford: Alta Mira Press. A Division of Rowman & Littlefield Publishers, INC., 2002, 293 pp.
- Gandhi and the World Today. A Russian Perspective. New Delhi: Rajendra Prasad Academy, 1998, 84 pp.
- Sufi Wisdom. Albany: State University of New York Press, 1994, 132 pp.
- The Philosophical Aspects of Sufism. New Delhi: Ajanta Publications, 1989, 109 pp.
- Islamic Philosophy and Social Thought (XIX-XX Centuries). Lahore: People`s Publishing House, 1989, 159 pp.
- Lotoso Zviedasant Delno (in Litvinian). Vilnius: Leidykla "Mintis", 1973, 142 pp.
- Pakistan: Philosophy and Sociology. Lahore: People`s Publishing House, 1972, 150 pp.

=== Edited ===
- Philosophy and Science in Cultures of East and West. Cultural Heritage and Contemporary Change. Series IVA, Eastern and Central European Philosophical Studies, Vol. 50. Russian philosophical studies XIII. Washington: Council for Research in Values and Philosophy, 2014.
- Knowledge and Belief in the Dialogue of Cultures. Cultural Heritage and Contemporary Change. Series IVA, Eastern and CentralEurope; V. 39. Washington: The Council for Research in Values and Philosophy, 2011.
- Russia Looks at India. A Spectrum of Philosophical Views. New Delhi: Indian Council of Philosophical Research Published in association with D.K.Printworld Lyd., 2010.
- Comparative Ethics in a Global Age. Washington: The Council for Research in Values and Philosophy, 2007.
- Religion and Identity in Modern Russia. The Revival of Orthodoxy and Islam. Burlington: Ashgate, 2005 (co-ed. with Juliet Johnson and Benjamin Forest).
- Technology and Cultural Values: On the Edge of the Third Millennium. Honolulu: University of Hawai’i Press, 2003 (co-ed. with Peter Hershock and Roger T. Ames).
- Sufismo e confraternite nell’islam contemporaneo. Il difficile equilibrio tra mistica e politica. Torino: Edizioni della Fondazione Giovanni Agnelli, 2003.
- Justice and Democracy: Crosscultural Perspectives. Honolulu: Hawaii University Press, 1997 (co-edited with Ron Bontekoe).
- History of Indian Philosophy. A Russian Viewpoint. New Delhi: Indian Council of Philosophical Research, 1993.
- Muslim Philosophy in Soviet Studies. New Delhi: Sterling Publishing House, 1988.
- Al-tirasal-filasafial-islahifiajaissofiatia. Beirut: dar al-Farabi, 1987.
