= Three Muslim Sages =

1964 book by Seyyed Hossein Nasr

Three Muslim sages: Avicenna, Suhrawardī, Ibn Arabī is a 1964 book by the Iranian philosopher Seyyed Hossein Nasr.

== See also ==
- An Introduction to Islamic Cosmological Doctrines

== Sources ==
- Rosenthal, Franz (1964). "Three Muslim Sages: Avicenna-Suhrawardî-Ibn'Arabî". Speculum. 39 (4). University of Chicago Press: 735. doi:10.2307/2854778. ISSN 0038-7134. JSTOR 2854778.
- Siraj Ad-Din , Abu Bakr (1964). "Three Muslim Sages: Avicenna-Suhrawardî-Ibn'Arabî". Islamic Quarterly. 8 (3): 95.
- Ivie, William K. (1965). "Three Muslim Sages". Books Abroad. 39 (1). JSTOR: 112. doi:10.2307/40119514. ISSN 0006-7431. JSTOR 40119514.
- Wernst, Paul (1965). "Three Muslim Sages: Avicenna, Suhrawadi, Ibn 'Arabi". Oriens. 18. JSTOR: 355. doi:10.2307/1579746. ISSN 0078-6527. JSTOR 1579746.
- Watt, W. Montgomery (1965). "Three Muslim Sages: Avicenna, Suhrawadi, Ibn 'Arabi". The Journal of the Royal Asiatic Society of Great Britain and Ireland (1/2). [Cambridge University Press, Royal Asiatic Society of Great Britain and Ireland]: 82. doi:10.1017/S0035869X00124062. JSTOR 25202848.
