= Traditional Islam In The Modern World =

1990 book by Seyyed Hossein Nasr

Traditional Islam In The Modern World is a book written in 1990 by the Iranian philosopher Seyyed Hossein Nasr.

== Sources ==
- Naqvi, S. Ali Raza (1990). "Traditional Islam In The Modern World". Islamic Studies. 29 (3). Islamic Research Institute, International Islamic University, Islamabad: 331–333. doi:10.52541/isiri.v29i03.5232. ISSN 0578-8072. JSTOR 20840005.
- Eaton, Hasan (1987). "Traditional Islam In The Modern World". Islamic Quarterly. 31 (2): 131. ProQuest 1304278539.
- Troll, Christian W. (1990). "Traditional Islam In The Modern World". Anthropos. 85 (1/3). Anthropos Institut: 253–255. ISSN 0257-9774. JSTOR 40462167.
- Hamès, Constant (1992). "Traditional Islam In The Modern World". Archives de sciences sociales des religions. 37 (80). EHESS: 282. JSTOR 30128648.
- Minault, Gail (1988). "Traditional Islam In The Modern World". Middle East Journal. 42 (1). Middle East Institute: 130–131. JSTOR 4327707.
