= Ideals and Realities of Islam =

1966 book by Seyyed Hossein Nasr

Ideals and Realities of Islam is a 1966 book by the Iranian philosopher Seyyed Hossein Nasr.

== See also ==
- The Heart of Islam

== Sources ==
- Burton, John (1968). "Seyyed Hossein Nasr: Ideals and realities of Islam". Bulletin of the School of Oriental and African Studies. 31 (2). Cambridge University Press (CUP): 395–397. doi:10.1017/s0041977x0014666x. ISSN 0041-977X.
- Ma'ṣumī, M. Ṣag̱ẖīr Ḥasan (1968). "Ideals and Realities of Islam". Islamic Studies. 7 (3). Islamic Research Institute, International Islamic University, Islamabad: 305–307. ISSN 0578-8072. JSTOR 20832924.
- Nemoy, Leon (1968). "Ideals and Realities of Islam". Jewish Social Studies. 30 (3). Indiana University Press: 179–181. JSTOR 4615350.
- Mahdi, Muhsin (1969). "Ideals and Realities of Islam". Journal of Near Eastern Studies. 28 (2). University of Chicago Press: 125–126. doi:10.1086/372000. JSTOR 543320.
- Elwell-Sutton, L. P. (1977). "Ideals and Realities of Islam". Religious Studies. 13 (3). Cambridge University Press: 376–377. doi:10.1017/S0034412500010209. JSTOR 20005434.
