= The Garden of Truth =

2007 book by Seyyed Hossein Nasr

The Garden Of Truth: The Vision and Promise of Sufism, Islam's Mystical Tradition is a 2007 book by the Iranian philosopher Seyyed Hossein Nasr.

== Sources ==
- Safavi, Seyed Sadreddin (2012). "The Garden Of Truth: The Vision and Promise of Sufism, Islam's Mystical Tradition". Transcendent Philosophy. 28 (13). Academy of Iranian Studies: 249–252.
