= Victor Danner =

Mexican-American author, researcher, and translator

Victor Danner (October 22, 1926 – October 28, 1990) was a Mexican-American author, researcher, and translator specializing in comparative religion and Islamic mysticism.

== Biography ==
Victor Danner was born on October 22, 1926, in Mexico to Mexican and American parents, though he was raised and educated in the United States. Following his service in the military during World War II, he graduated from Georgetown University with a B.S. in Arabic Studies, and spent seven years as a teacher in Morocco. He also held the position of administrator for the American Language Program, which was sponsored by the American Embassy in Rabat.

Back in the US, he earned his doctorate in Near Eastern Languages and Literatures from Harvard University in 1970. He taught Arabic language and literature, Sufism, Eastern religions, and comparative mysticism at Indiana University from 1967 to 1990. He was head of the Department of Near Eastern Languages and Cultures at the university, where he is remembered as a distinguished and erudite professor, a pioneer in these fields at the institution, which owed him much for his many contributions.

Danner was influenced by perennial philosophy, as expounded by the French metaphysician René Guénon and his Swiss follower Frithjof Schuon, who both stressed "a transcendent unity of religions, esotericism, and a condemnation of the modern desacralization of the world". In 1967, Danner founded in Bloomington, Indiana, a chapter of the Maryamiyya Sufi order created by Schuon, which would become the most important center of the order, and the site of the community's "development toward a more universal orientation". According to Hugh Urban, an outspoken critic of Schuon, this development took an eclectic orientation, incorporating elements of indigenous and European philosophies and an apocalyptic imagery. However, some years later, Danner was excluded from the administration of the community.

Schuon settled in Bloomington in 1980. Danner himself became an influential perennialist in the United States, and a reference in studies on Sufism. He attributed his personal interactions with Sufi followers and their institutions when he was in Morocco for the development of his understanding of Sufism.

Danner died on October 28, 1990, in the United States. His death was mourned in an editorial in the American Journal of Islamic Social Sciences, which described him as "a friend of Islam and Muslims". The Victor Danner Memorial Lecture Series at Indiana University is named after him.

== Works ==
He was an esteemed scholar of religions, and of Islam in particular, and a highly praised translator of Arabic. Among his best-known books are Ibn ‘Ata Allah's Sufi Aphorisms (1973), The Book of Wisdoms: A Collection of Sufi Aphorisms (translation, 1978), and The Islamic Tradition: An Introduction (1988). He has also written articles and essays for the British journal Studies in Comparative Religion.

In a review published in the Journal of the Royal Asiatic Society by Ralph Austin, his translation of Ibn 'Ata Allah's Sufi Aphorisms was lauded as "an extremely important contribution to the woefully short list of Sufi works available in English, not only for its many qualities, as for his obvious sympathy and insight which he added to his translation, indispensable elements in the translation of a spiritual work of this kind". The publication was the first complete translation of the Arabic originals, and has become a much-cited standard text. Abdullah Durkee praised the translation as "magnificent".
