= Ruqayya Yasmine Khan =

Islamic studies scholar

Ruqayya Yasmine Khan is a professor of religion and Malas Chair of Islamic Studies at Claremont Graduate University.

== Biography ==
Ruqayya Yasmine Khan holds a PhD in Islamic Studies and Arabic Literature, as well as an MA in South Asian Studies and Islam, both from the University of Pennsylvania. Since 2013, she has been the Mohannad Malas Chair of the MA Program in Islamic Studies at Claremont Graduate University.

Prior to this role, she held visiting faculty positions in the religion departments at Swarthmore College and the University of California, Santa Barbara, and later became a tenured faculty member in the Department of Religion at Trinity University in San Antonio, Texas.

Khan's research has been supported by fellowships from the Center for Arabic Study Abroad at the American University in Cairo, the Andrew W. Mellon Foundation, the Ford Foundation, and the Fulbright-Hays Program. She has also conducted research at the Institute of Islamic Studies at the University of Sarajevo, Bosnia and Herzegovina. She received funding from the Fletcher Jones Foundation for her work on Hafsa bint ‘Umar ibn al-Khattab, an early figure in Islamic history.

She is involved in the study of comparative religion through her role on the steering committee at the American Academy of Religion and serves on the editorial boards of various academic journals.

== Works ==
- Self and Secrecy in Early Islam (University of South Carolina Press, 2008)
- Bedouin and Abbasid Muslim Cultural Identities: The Arabic Story of Majnun Layla (Routledge Press, 2019)
- Did a Woman Edit the Qur’an? Hafsa and Her Famed Codex (2014) (journal article)
- Muhammad in the Digital Age (University of Texas Press, 2015) (ed.)
