= Michael Elias Marmura =

Palestinian scholar of Islamic philosophy

- Born: 11 November 1929; Jerusalem, Mandatory Palestine
- Died: 17 September 2009 (aged 79); Antigonish, Canada
- Education: University of Wisconsin; University of Michigan
- Occupations: Scholar of Islamic philosophy, Professor Emeritus
- Employer: University of Toronto
- Known for: Teaching Islamic thought and Arabic literature at the University of Toronto
- Awards: Fellow of the Royal Society of Canada

Michael Elias Marmura (November 11, 1929 - September 17, 2009) was a Palestinian scholar of Islamic philosophy and Professor Emeritus of Near and Middle Eastern Civilizations at the University of Toronto. He was a Fellow of the Royal Society of Canada.

== Life and career ==
Michael Elias Marmura was born on November 11, 1929, in Jerusalem, Mandatory Palestine. He completed his early education in Jerusalem, and after becoming well-versed in the literary tradition of his native Arabic, he moved to the United States to further his studies. He earned his undergraduate degree from the University of Wisconsin before attending graduate school at the University of Michigan. Marmura received his PhD in Islamic philosophy in 1959, under the direction of George Hourani, a well-known scholar of Islamic philosophy and theology. In the fall of 1959, he accepted a position at the University of Toronto's Department of Near Eastern Studies (later known as the Department of Middle East and Islamic Studies, and now known as the Department of Near and Middle Eastern Civilizations). He retired from the profession in 1995 after thirty-six years of teaching Islamic thought and Arabic literature at the University of Toronto, where he also served as chair of the department.

== Death ==
Marmura died in Antigonish on the evening of September 17, 2009.

== Legacy ==
The University of Toronto has established the Michael E. Marmura Lecture Series in Arabic Studies in his honor.

== Works ==
- Probing in Islamic Philosophy: Studies in the Philosophies of Ibn Sina, al-Ghazali, and Other Major Muslim Thinkers
- Avicenna, The Metaphysics of The Healing (Brigham Young University - Islamic Translation Series)
- Al Ghazali, The Incoherence of the Philosophers (Translator)
