= Religion and the Order of Nature =

1996 book by Seyyed Hossein Nasr

Religion and the Order of Nature is a 1996 book by the Iranian philosopher Seyyed Hossein Nasr.

== See also ==
- The Encounter of Man and Nature

== Sources ==
- Blissman, Beth (1998). "Religion and the Order of Nature". Review of Religious Research. 40 (2). JSTOR: 182–84. doi:10.2307/3512305. ISSN 0034-673X. JSTOR 3512305.
- Arif, Nasr (1997). "Religion and the Order of Nature". American Journal of Islam and Society. 14 (2). International Institute of Islamic Thought: 290–295. doi:10.35632/ajis.v14i2.2246. ISSN 2690-3741.
- French, William (1999). "Religion and the Order of Nature". The Journal of Religion. 79 (4). University of Chicago Press: 689–691. doi:10.1086/490533. JSTOR 1206147.
- Leigh Jr., Egbert Giles (1998). "Religion and the Order of Nature". International Journal for Philosophy of Religion. 44 (2). Springer: 124–126. doi:10.1023/A:1017193012060. JSTOR 40018858.
