= Adnan Aslan =

Turkish academic and scholar of religions

Adnan Aslan (born 1963) is a Turkish Islamic scholar.

== Biography ==
Aslan was born in Kayseri in central Turkey in 1963 and received his education in both Turkey and England. He completed his BA in theology from Erciyes University in Turkey and received his MA in history and philosophy of religion from King's College London in 1990. He earned his PhD in philosophy of religion from Lancaster University in England in 1995. Aslan worked at a number of universities in Turkey. He has served as the dean of faculty of humanities and social sciences at Süleyman Sah University in Istanbul. He has also served as an adjunct professor at the department of philosophy at the University of Notre Dame du Lac and a faculty associate at Indiana University of South Bend.

== Works ==
- Religious Pluralism in Christian and Islamic Philosophy: The Thought of John Hick and Seyyed Hossein Nasr
