= Mohammed Rustom =

Canadian Islamic studies scholar (born 1980)

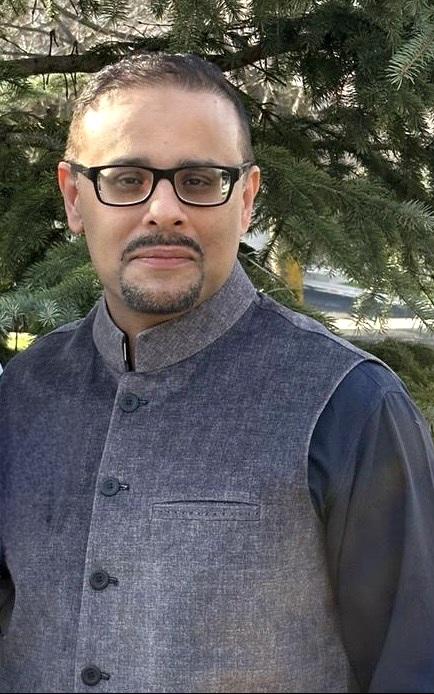
- Born: Mohammed Rustom; August 21, 1980 (age 46); Toronto, Canada

Academic background
- Education: University of Toronto
- Influences: Seyyed Hossein Nasr, Michael Elias Marmura, William Chittick, Todd Lawson

Academic work
- Notable works: The Triumph of Mercy: Philosophy and Scripture in Mulla Sadra The Study Quran: A New Translation and Commentary Inrushes of the Heart: The Sufi Philosophy of 'Ayn al-Qudat
- Website: www.mohammedrustom.com

Mohammed Rustom (born 1980) is a Canadian Islamic studies scholar. He is professor of Islamic thought and Global Philosophy at Carleton University (College of the Humanities and Department of Philosophy) and Executive Director of the Tokat Institute. His research interests include Arabic and Persian Sufi literature, Islamic philosophy, Qur’anic exegesis, translation theory, and cross-cultural philosophy.

== Biography ==
Rustom was born in 1980 in Toronto, and was raised in Richmond Hill. His family, originally from Tanzania, moved to Canada in the 1970s and are ethnically Khojas with origins in Karachi. He completed his undergraduate studies in the humanities at the University of Toronto in 2004, earning an Hon. BA in Islamic studies with a focus on Arabic and Persian, as well as philosophy. He then obtained a PhD in Islamic philosophy and Sufi literature from the same university in 2009 and subsequently joined Carleton University. Rustom studied Islamic philosophy under notable scholars such as Seyyed Hossein Nasr, Todd Lawson, William Chittick, and Michael Elias Marmura, acknowledging their significant influence in shaping his interest in Islamic philosophy and Sufism.

== Works ==
- Journal of Islamic Philosophy: A Special Issue on Mulla Sadra (2010)
- The Triumph of Mercy: Philosophy and Scripture in Mulla Sadra (SUNY Press, 2012) (Winner of Iran's 21st International Book of the Year Prize)
- In Search of the Lost Heart: Explorations in Islamic Thought (co-ed.) (SUNY Press, 2012)
- Sufi Metafiziği (Nefes, 2014)
- The Study Quran: A New Translation and Commentary (assistant ed.) (HarperOne, 2015)
- The Condemnation of Pride and Self-Admiration (Islamic Texts Society, 2018)
- Mysticism and Ethics in Islam (co-ed.) (AUB Press, 2022)
- Journal of Sufi Studies: Special Issue on Sufi Texts in Translation (co-ed.) (Brill, 2022)
- The Essence of Reality: A Defense of Philosophical Sufism (NYU Press, 2022)
- Islamic Thought and the Art of Translation: Texts and Studies in Honor of William C. Chittick and Sachiko Murata (Brill, 2023)
- From the Divine to the Human: Contemporary Islamic Thinkers on Evil, Suffering, and the Global Pandemic (co-ed.) (Routledge, 2023)
- Inrushes of the Heart: The Sufi Philosophy of 'Ayn al-Qudat (SUNY Press, 2023)
- A Sourcebook in Global Philosophy (Equinox, 2025)
- I of the Heart: Texts and Studies in Honor of Seyyed Hossein Nasr (co-ed.) (Brill, 2025)
- The Study Quran (Arabic-English Edition, with Commentary) (assistant ed.) (HarperOne, 2027)

== See also ==
- Atif Khalil
