= Ghaflah =

Arabic word for heedlessness, forgetfulness or carelessness

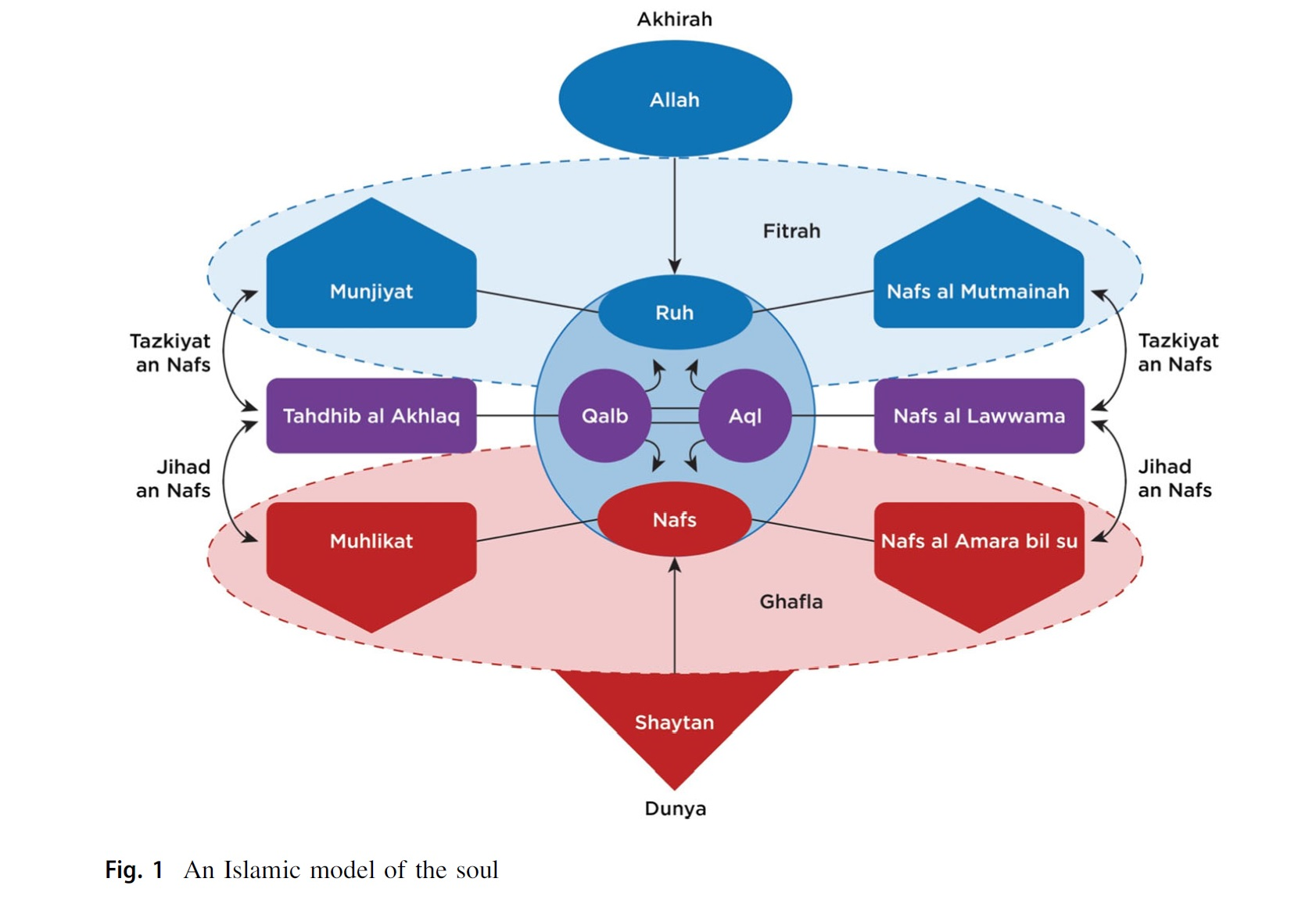
A visual rendition of the Islamic model of the soul showing the region of "'ghaflah" relative to other concepts based on a consensus of 18 surveyed academic and religious experts.

Ghaflah (غفلة) is the Arabic word for "heedlessness", "forgetfulness" or "carelessness". In an Islamic context, it is the sin of forgetting God and one's divine origins, or being indifferent of these.

In the Quran, ghaflah is often associated with "dalal" (going astray), kufr (disbelief), zulm (wrongdoing), and shirk (worshiping others beside God). The state of heedlessness or forgetfulness is to be remedied through dhikr or remembrance of God.

== Etymology ==
Ghaflah is an Arabic word that means heedlessness or carelessness, and the term ghafil refers to those who are neglectful or heedless.

== Concept ==
Toshihiko Izutsu argues that the term "ghaflah" used in the Quran has both a common and a religious connotation. The common usage of the word can be seen in the story of Jacob and his sons, as mentioned in verse 12:13 of the Quran. In this verse, Jacob tells his sons: "Verily, it grieves me that you should take him out with you; I fear lest the wolf devour him [Joseph] while you are heedless (ghafilun) of him." In its religious usage, "ghaflah" is closely related to another similar concept called "dalal". "Dalal" refers to deviating from the path of guidance, while "ghaflah" means to be completely unaware of it. In Surah 25, verse 44 of the Quran, the disbelievers thus are compared to cattle in their state of "dalal". Similarly, they are characterized by the property of "ghaflah" or heedlessness. The Quran states in 7:178-179: "Whomsoever God guides (yahdi), he is guided (muhtadi), while whomsoever He leads astray (yudlil), such are the losers. We have created for Gehenna a huge number of jinn and men who, having hearts, understand not therewith. They are like the cattle. Nay, they are further astray (adallu). They are the heedless (ghafilun, part. pl.)".

The notion of ghaflah may also refer to the pre-revelational state of humanity as is evident in Surah 36, verses 5-6, which refer to the Quran as "The Revelation of the Mighty, the Merciful, that thou [Muhammad] mayest warn a people whose fathers were never warned, and who are, consequently, heedless". The notion of ghaflah is also closely related to kufr, zulm, and shirk, as is seen in 21:97-98, which says: "When the true promise [i.e. the chastisement of Hell] draws nigh, lo, how fixedly open they are, the eyes of the Kafirs! [They say], ‘Alas for us! We were in heedlessness (ghaflah) of this. Nay, we were wrongdoers (zalimin).’ ‘Verily, you and what you used [to] worship beside God, are all fuel for Jahannam . You are now going to enter it.’"

According to The New Encyclopedia of Islam, "Ghaflah is the sin of indifference to the reality of God". The people who are identified as being negligent or heedless (ghafil) in the Quran have a limited understanding and appreciation of the true essence of life. These individuals are preoccupied with only the superficial aspects of the world and do not pay attention to the significance of the hereafter (30:7).

If the human fitra already recognizes tawhid, why do the prophets need to speak about it? In one word, the answer is "heedlessness" (ghafla). The Koran uses this word as a near synonym for "forgetfulness" (nisyan). Iblis rebelled because of pride and arrogance, but Adam slipped because he forgot. "And We made covenant with Adam before, but he forgot, and We found in him no constancy" (20:115). The fundamental difference between Adam and Iblis comes out in their responses to God when he questioned them about their disobedience. Iblis refused to admit that he had done anything wrong and blamed God for leading him astray. Adam and Eve recognized at once that they were at fault, and therefore they asked God to forgive them.... This does not mean that forgetfulness and heedlessness are without blame. On the contrary, they are the fundamental fault of human beings.... To forget God is to forget tawhid, and without tawhid there can be no salvation.

— Sachiko Murata and William Chittick, The Vision of Islam, 1994

The Quran mentions that before receiving the revelation, even the Prophet himself was in a state of heedlessness or "ghaflah", as the Quran states in 12:3: "We narrate to thee the best of stories in that We have revealed to thee this Quran, although thou wast aforetime of the heedless".

== Dhikr as remedy ==
According to Sachiko Murata and William Chittick, "If forgetfulness and heedlessness mark the basic fault of human beings, dhikr (remembrance) designates their saving virtue". God thus sends the prophets to remind people of the Covenant they made with Him before their birth, which they have forgotten due to heedlessness. The prophets do this by reciting God's signs and reminding people of their debt to Him. In response, people are expected to remember God by glorifying and praising Him in their prayers. The act of remembrance of God is considered crucial in fulfilling the purpose of human existence, as it restores the bond between the Creator and His creation.

According to Islam, the great sin of man is in fact forgetfulness (al-ghaflah) and the purpose of the message of revelation is to enable man to remember. That is why one of the names of the Quran itself is "the Remembrance of Allah" (dhikr Allah) and why the ultimate end and purpose of all Islamic rites and of all Islamic conjunctions is the remembrance of Allah.

— Seyyed Hossein Nasr, A Young Muslim's Guide to the Modern World, 1993

== See also ==
- Sufi psychology

== Sources ==
- Murata, S.; Chittick, W.C. (1994). The Vision of Islam: The Foundations of Muslim Faith and Practice. Visions of reality. I.B. Tauris. ISBN 978-1-86064-022-3.
- Glassé, C.; Smith, H. (2001). The New Encyclopedia of Islam. AltaMira Press. ISBN 978-0-7591-0190-6..
- Izutsu, T. (2002). Ethico-Religious Concepts in the Qur'an. McGill Islamic studies. McGill-Queen's University Press. ISBN 978-0-7735-2426-2.
- Rothman, Abdallah; Coyle, Adrian (2018). "Toward a Framework for Islamic Psychology and Psychotherapy: An Islamic Model of the Soul". Journal of Religion and Health. 57 (5). Springer Science and Business Media LLC: 1731–1744. doi:10.1007/s10943-018-0651-x. ISSN 0022-4197. PMC 6132620. PMID 29907906.
- Nasr, S.H. (1993). A Young Muslim's Guide to the Modern World. Islamic Texts Society. ISBN 978-0-946621-51-4.
