= Henry Corbin =

French philosopher and orientalist (1903–1978)

- Born: 14 April 1903; Paris, France
- Died: 7 October 1978 (aged 75); Paris, France

Philosophical work
- Era: 20th-century philosophy
- Region: Western philosophy, Middle Eastern philosophy (Iranian philosophy)
- School: Islamic philosophy (hikmah); Christian philosophy Western esotericism Hermeneutics
- Main interests: Angelology, anthropology, cosmology, ontology, metaphysics, phenomenology, religion, theology
- Notable ideas: Prophetic philosophy, imaginal world

Henry Corbin (14 April 1903 – 7 October 1978) was a French philosopher, theologian, and Iranologist, professor of Islamic studies at the École pratique des hautes études. He was influential in extending the modern study of traditional Islamic philosophy from early falsafa to later and "mystical" figures such as Suhrawardi, Ibn Arabi, and Mulla Sadra Shirazi. With works such as Histoire de la philosophie islamique (1964), he challenged the common European view that philosophy in the Islamic world declined after Averroes and Avicenna.

Born into a Catholic family, he converted to Protestantism between 1927 and 1930. He received a Catholic education, obtaining a certificate in Scholastic philosophy from the Catholic Institute of Paris at age 19. Three years later he took his "license de philosophie" under the Thomist thinker Étienne Gilson. He studied modern philosophy, including hermeneutics and phenomenology, becoming the first French translator of Martin Heidegger. On 13 October 1929, Louis Massignon (director of Islamic studies at the Sorbonne) introduced him to Suhrawardi, the 12th-century Persian Muslim thinker. In a late interview, Corbin said: "through my meeting with Suhrawardi, my spiritual destiny ... was sealed. Platonism, expressed in terms of the Zoroastrian angelology of ancient Persia, illuminated the path that I was seeking." He thus dedicated himself to understanding Iranian Islam, which he believed esoterically expressed older perennial insights related to Zoroastrianism and Platonism.

Corbin regularly spent time in Iran, working with Shia thinkers such as Muhammad Husayn Tabatabai and Seyyed Hossein Nasr. He also became prominent in the European Eranos circle of scholars initiated by Carl Jung, whose theories (such as the collective unconscious and active imagination) he appreciated. Aside from Islamic thought, Corbin wrote on Christian mysticism, especially Emanuel Swedenborg and the Holy Grail.

== Life and work ==
The philosophical life and career of Corbin can be divided into three phases. The first is the 1920s and 1930s, when he was involved in learning and teaching western philosophy. The second is the years between 1939 and 1946, in which he studied Shahab al-Din Suhrawardi and the School of Illumination while living in Istanbul. The last phase begins in 1946 and lasts until his death, in which he studied and reintroduced eastern and Islamic philosophy.

In 1933 he married Stella Leenhardt. In 1938, he completed the first translation of one of Heidegger's works into French (Was ist Metaphysik?, as Qu’est-ce que la metaphysique?). In 1939 Corbin and his wife traveled to Istanbul, and in 1945 to Tehran. They returned to Paris one year later in July 1946. In 1949, Corbin first attended the annual Eranos Conferences in Ascona, Switzerland. In 1954 he succeeded Louis Massignon in the Chair of Islam and the Religions of Arabia at the École Pratique des Hautes Études in Paris. From the 1950s on he spent autumn in Tehran, winter in Paris and spring in Ascona.

The three major works upon which his reputation largely rests in the English speaking world were first published in French in the 1950s: Avicenna and the Visionary Recital, Creative Imagination in the Sufism of Ibn 'Arabi and Spiritual Body and Celestial Earth. His later major work on Central Asian and Iranian Sufism appears in English with an Introduction by Zia Inayat Khan as The Man of Light in Iranian Sufism. His magnum opus is the four volume En Islam Iranien: Aspects spirituels et philosophiques which remains untranslated into English. It has been translated into Persian twice by Dr Enshollah Rahmati and Reza Kuhkan from French (the 4th volume being still untranslated). He died on 7 October 1978.

== Main themes ==
There are several main themes which together form the core of the spirituality that Corbin defends. The Imagination is the primary means to engage with Creation. Prayer is the "supreme act of the creative imagination". He considered himself a Protestant Christian but he abandoned a Christocentric view of history. The grand sweep of his theology of the Holy Spirit embraces Judaism, Christianity and Islam. He defended the central role assigned in theology for the individual as the finite image of the Unique Divine.

His mysticism is no world-denying asceticism but regards all of Creation as a theophany of the divine. This vision has much in common with what has become known as Creation Spirituality, and the figure of the Angel Holy Spirit is similar to what is sometimes called the Cosmic Christ.

== Legacy and influence ==
Corbin's ideas have continued through colleagues, students and others influenced by his work. Especially during his tenure at the Imperial Iranian Academy of Philosophy founded in 1974 by Seyyed Hossein Nasr. There he collaborated with western and non-western academics like William Chittick, Toshihiko Izutsu, Sayyed Jalal-ed-Din Ashtiani, Abbas Zaryab, Toshio Kuroda and others. He also influenced Peter Lamborn Wilson who studied under Corbin whilst in Iran who would go on to publish reviews on Corbin's work in the first publication of the journal Temenos by the Temenos Academy in 1981. The journal Temenos also published English translations of Corbin's work, specifically by Peter Russell, Liadain Sherrard, Kathleen Raine between 1981 and 1992. The journal was revived in 1998 as the Temenos Academy Review and continued to have translations of Corbin's work between 1998 and 2009 by Kathleen Raine and Christine Rhone. Other scholars of Sufism and Islamic thought that were influenced by Corbin are Christian Jambet, Ali Amir-Moezzi, Hermann Landolt, Pierre Lory, James Cowan, James Morris, and Todd Lawson.

Corbin was an important source for the archetypal psychology of James Hillman and others who have developed the psychology of Carl Jung. In addition, Corbin was good friends with Jacques Lacan, the French reinterpreter of Sigmund Freud, which gave Lacan a familiarity with Islamic thought. According to Behrooz Ghamari-Tabrizi, Michel Foucault's mystical understanding of Shia Islam which he utilised while reporting on the Iranian revolution was shaped by the scholarship of Louis Massignon and Henry Corbin. The American literary critic Harold Bloom claims Corbin as a significant influence on his own conception of Gnosticism, and the American poet Charles Olson was a student of Corbin's Avicenna and the Visionary Recital. Corbin's friends and colleagues in France have established L'Association des Amis de Henry et Stella Corbin for the dissemination of his work through meetings and colloquia, and the publication of his posthumous writings.

Corbin's work has been criticized by a number of writers, including Steven M. Wasserstrom. Corbin's scholarly objectivity has been questioned on the basis of both a Shi'ite bias, and his theological agenda; he has been accused of being both ahistorically naive and dangerously politically reactionary; and he has been charged with being both an Iranian nationalist and an elitist in both his politics and his spirituality. Other writers, such as Lory and Subtelny, have written to defend Corbin.

== Selected bibliography ==
- Avicenna and the Visionary Recital. Princeton University Press, 1960.
- Histoire de la philosophie Islamique. Gallimard, 1964. (Re-issued by Kegan Paul in 1993 as History of Islamic Philosophy ISBN 0-7103-0416-1..)
- Creative Imagination in the Sufism of Ibn 'Arabi. Princeton University Press, 1969. (Re-issued in 1998 as Alone with the Alone.)
- En Islam Iranien: Aspects spirituels et philosophiques (4 vols.). Gallimard, 1971–73.
- Spiritual Body and Celestial Earth: From Mazdean Iran to Shi'ite Iran. Princeton University Press, 1977.
- Le Paradoxe du Monothéisme. l'Herne, 1981.
- Cyclical Time and Ismaili Gnosis. KPI, 1983.
- L'Homme et Son Ange: Initiation et Chevalerie Spirituelle. Fayard, 1983.
- Face de Dieu, Face de l'homme: Hermeneutique et soufisme. Flammarion, 1983.
- Temple and Contemplation. KPI, 1986.
- The Man of Light in Iranian Sufism. Omega Publications, 1994.
- Swedenborg and Esoteric Islam. Swedenborg Foundation, 1995.

== Documentaries ==
- The Seeker of Orient, directed by Masoud Taheri, 2019

== See also ==
- Ahmad Fardid
- Active imagination
- Barzakh
- Falsafa
- Hossein Nasr
- Iranistics
- Martin Heidegger
- Nader El-Bizri
- Sufi studies
- Temenos Academy Review
