= Sirat al-Mustaqim =

Islamic term meaning 'the straight path'

Sirat al-Mustaqim (Arabic: الصراط المستقيم, romanized: aṣ-ṣirāṭ al-mustaqīm) is an Arabic term that means 'the straight path'. It is commonly understood as the path that leads to God. In Islamic thought, the straight path is variously used as a reference to the Quran or Muhammad, or Islam as a whole.

== In the Quran and exegetical traditions ==
The term "aṣ-sirāṭ al-mustaqīm" is mentioned approximately 33 times in the Quran. The phrase specifically appears in Surah Fatiha (1:6), which is traditionally regarded as "the essence of the Quran". The supplication in Quran 1:6 ("Guide us to the straight path") is interpreted by some commentators as a prayer for steadfastness in following the straight path and for ongoing assistance and support to remain firm in adhering to the path of truth. This supplication for guidance towards the straight path "implies seeking to be led to God Himself", indicating a longing for intimacy, nearness, knowledge, and love of God.

There are varying interpretations of the straight path in Islam, with some viewing it as a reference to the Quran, while others consider it to represent Islam or the Prophet. The straight path is understood as a reference to a clear, direct, and uncomplicated road without any deviation or crookedness. It represents a balanced and moderate approach to life that avoids both worldliness and extreme asceticism. The straight path is characterized by the integration of the outward aspects of religious law with the inner dimensions of spirituality, creating a harmonious blend of the exoteric and esoteric aspects of faith. It emphasizes the importance of serving God through external human behavior while simultaneously fostering a deeper spiritual connection with God.

To be on the straight path, or a straight path as it is usually presented in the Quran, can also be understood as walking with God to God; to God because God guides the believers unto Himself upon a straight path (4:175), and with God because God Himself is upon a straight path, as when the Prophet Hūd says, Truly I trust in God, my Lord and your Lord. There is no creature that crawls, but that He holds it by its forelock. Truly my Lord is upon a straight path (11:56).

— Seyyed Hossein Nasr et al, The Study Quran, 2015

In one instance, the Quran uses the term ṭarīq mustaqīm (a straight road). Al-Tustari connects it to the term "sirāṭ al-mustaqīm" and suggests that the path of truth involves abandoning worldly transactions and formalities and instead striving to realize the truth. The straight path is sometimes interpreted as the path that individuals, both humans and jinn, must cross during the final stage of Judgment before entering Paradise or the Garden.

== In prophetic tradition ==
Muhammad is reported to have described the straight path in Islam as the following:

“God has set forth a parable: a straight path that is surrounded by two walls on both sides, with several open doors within the walls covered by curtains. A caller on the gate of the path calls out, ‘O people! Stay on the path and do not deviate from it.’ Meanwhile, a caller from above the path is also warning any person who wants to open any of these doors, ‘Woe unto you! Do not open it, for if you open it you will fall through.’ The straight path is Islam, the two walls are the limits set by God, while the doors refer to what God has prohibited. The caller on the gate of the path is the Book of God, while the caller above the path is God’s admonishment present in the heart of every Muslim”.

== See also ==
- Fitra
- Rūḥ
- Qalb
- Nafs
- 'Aql
- Matthew 7:14 - the Christian Bible passage recounting Jesus' Sermon on the Mount, which also underlines the importance of 'the straight path' in Abrahamic religion.

== Sources ==
- El-Sheikh, Salah (1999). "Sirat al-Mustaqim and Hikma". American Journal of Islam and Society. 16 (2). International Institute of Islamic Thought: 55–87. doi:10.35632/ajis.v16i2.2129. ISSN 2690-3741.
- Nasr, S.H.; Dagli, C.K.; Dakake, M.M.; Lumbard, J.E.B.; Rustom, M. (2015). The Study Quran: A New Translation and Commentary -- Leather Edition. HarperCollins. ISBN 978-0-06-112588-1.

== External links. ==
- Sirat Al-Mustaqim or Siratulmustaqim
