= Ma'rifa =

Sufi term for spiritual knowledge

In Sufism, maʿrifa ("experiential knowledge" or "gnosis") is the mystical understanding of God or Divine Reality. It has been described as an immediate recognition and understanding of the true nature of things as they are. Ma'rifa encompasses a deep understanding of the ultimate Truth, which is essentially God, and extends to the comprehension of all things in their connection to God. Sufi mystics attain maʿrifa by embarking on a spiritual journey, typically consisting of various stages referred to as "stations" and "states." In the state of ma'rifa, the mystic transcends the temptations of the self and is absorbed in God, experiencing a sense of alienation from their own self.

The term 'arif refers to advanced mystics who have attained ma'rifa.

== Concept ==
Ma'rifa is a central tenet of Sufism that embodies the notions of "gnosis" or "experiential knowledge." It is considered the ultimate pinnacle of the spiritual path. In Sufism, the supreme aspiration of human existence is the realization of Truth, which is synonymous with Reality and represents the origin of all existence. By attaining this Truth, individuals are set free, emancipated from the entanglements of ignorance. R. W. J. Austin describes ma'rifa as "an immediate recognition and grasp not of something new or strange but rather of the state and status of things as they really are, have always been, and eternally will be." In essence, ma'rifa involves recognizing that one's self is intricately connected to and an essential aspect of the divine Reality.

Although deeply involved with love and also on a certain level with action, Sufism is at the highest level a path of knowledge (ma'rifah in Arabic and (irfan in Persian), a knowledge that is illuminative and unitive, a knowledge whose highest object is the Truth as such, that is, God, and subsequently the knowledge of things in relation to God. There is such a thing as the Truth, and it can be known. This is the first of all certitudes, from which flow all other certitudes of human life. The knowledge of the Truth is like the light of the sun while love is like the heat that always accompanies that light.

— Seyyed Hossein Nasr, The Garden of Truth, 2007

In Sufi teachings, ma'rifa "is an apprehension of the divine unity in such a way that awareness of self is lost in awareness of God". The term 'arif, meaning "gnostic," has been employed to describe accomplished mystics who have reached the elevated spiritual stage of maʿrifa. According to al-Qushayri, a mystic attains the state of ma'rifa when the inner temptations of his soul subside, and his heart is no longer drawn towards thoughts that deviate from God. In this state, the mystic is certain of his return to God with every glance of Him, and he is blessed with insights into the hidden aspects of his own destiny, inspired by God Himself. In this state, the Sufi is completely absorbed in God and experiences a sense of alienation from his own self. In Sufi construction, ma'rifa surpasses "ordinary knowledge" ('ilm) as it encompasses a comprehensive grasp of reality. A Sufi proverb illustrates that ma'rifa is like a mirror through which the gnostic sees his Master.

According to Reza Shah-Kazemi, ma'rifa represents the highest level of knowledge accessible to an individual. However, its very essence transcends the limits of individual comprehension, leading to its characterization as "ignorance." On one hand, ma'rifa is said to be a source of enlightenment and clarity, shedding light on profound truths. However, on the other hand, its brilliance can be overwhelming, blinding, and ultimately extinguishing to the one who claims to possess this knowledge, known as the "knower" or al-a¯rif. This knowledge not only requires a state of "unknowing" but also demands the complete obliteration of the individual's sense of self. The ultimate degree of ma'rifa is defined by the inseparable combination of perfect knowledge and pure being.

According to Junayd Baghdadi, marifa or gnosis "is the hovering of the heart between declaring God too great to be comprehended, and declaring Him too mighty to be perceived. It consists in knowing that, whatever may be imagined in thy heart God is the opposite of it".

== 'Ilm and ma'rifa ==
In Sufi teachings, ma'rifa is frequently contrasted with ilm, which signifies knowledge gained through learning, and "'aql," which represents rational intellect. While 'ilm and ma'rifa might be considered synonymous by traditional theologians, Sufis place ma'rifa on a transcendent level. Sufi writers elucidate ma'rifa as a profound experiential understanding of the Divine, not something attainable solely through human efforts, but rather a bestowed gift from God, etching itself upon the seeker's heart. Ma'rifa signifies a transformative and intimate understanding of the Divine reality that surpasses mere intellectual comprehension. Ovamir Anjum, however, disputes the commonly held distinction between ma'rifa and 'ilm as depicted in Sufi writings. He argues that ma'rifa was originally synonymous with 'ilm, representing the process of acquiring knowledge, without specific reference to God's knowledge in the Qur'an. According to Anjum, the distinction between 'ilm as exoteric knowledge and ma'rifa as esoteric knowledge or gnosis lacks a solid etymological basis in earlier usage. He emphasizes that the Qur'an does not endorse this differentiation, as it considers the profound knowledge of God that inspires reverence to be encompassed within 'ilm alone. For example, a verse states, "Truly, only the possessors of 'ilm fear God" (Q. 35:28).

== Maqām ==
According to Annemarie Schimmel, the final stages of the mystical path are represented by love (mahabba) and gnosis (maʿrifa). There have been different perspectives on the relationship between these two concepts. Sometimes they were seen as mutually reinforcing, while in other instances, love was considered superior, and at times, gnosis was regarded as higher. Ghazali expresses the view that love without gnosis is unattainable since one can only love what one truly knows.

In one of the earliest accounts of the maqāmāt al-arba'īn ("forty stations") in Sufism, Sufi master Abu Said ibn Abi'l-Khayr lists ma'rifa as the 25th station:

"'The twenty-fifth station is gnosis (ma'rifat). Through all the creatures of the two worlds, and through all the people, they perceive Allah, and there is no accusation to be made of their perception."

== Four Doors ==
Marifa is often considered one of the "Four Doors" of Sufism:

- Sharia (Arabic: شريعة): legal path.
- Tariqa (Arabic: طريقة): methodico‑esoteric path.
- Haqiqa (Arabic: حقيقة): mystical truth/verity.
- Ma'rifa (Arabic: معرفة): mystical knowledge & awareness, mysticism.

A metaphor to explain the meaning of ma'rifa involves pearl gathering. Shari'a is the boat; tariqa is represented by the pearl gatherer's rowing and diving; haqiqa is the pearl; and ma'rifa is the gift to see the true pearl perpetually.

== See also ==
- Hikmah
- Hikmat al-Muta'aliyah
- Irfan
- Ilm (Arabic)
- Gnosis
- Illuminationism
  - Ilm-e-Huzuri (Knowledge by Presence)

== Sources ==
- Nguyen, Martin (2016). "Sufi Theological Thought". In Schmidtke, S. (ed.). The Oxford Handbook of Islamic Theology. Oxford Handbooks in Religion and Theology Series. Oxford University Press. ISBN 978-0-19-969670-3.
- Nasr, S.H. (2007). The Garden of Truth: The Vision and Promise of Sufism, Islam's Mystical Tradition. HarperCollins. ISBN 978-0-06-079722-5.
- Brown, D.W. (2009). A New Introduction to Islam. John Wiley & Sons. ISBN 978-1-4051-5807-7.
- Berman, J.R. (2012). American Arabesque: Arabs and Islam in the Nineteenth Century Imaginary. America and the Long 19th Century. NYU Press. ISBN 978-0-8147-2321-0.
- Anjum, Ovamir; al-Jawziyya, I.Q. (2020). "Translator's Introduction". Ranks of the Divine Seekers: A Parallel English-Arabic Text. Volume 1. Islamic Translation Series. Brill. ISBN 978-90-04-41341-2.
- Shah-Kazemi, R. (2002-05-01). "The Notion and Significance of Ma'rifa in Sufism". Journal of Islamic Studies. 13 (2). Oxford University Press (OUP): 155–181. doi:10.1093/jis/13.2.155. ISSN 0955-2340.
- Sevim, Erdem (2016-10-01). "Path to the Universal Self in Haji Baktash Walî: Four Doors - Forty Stations". Spiritual Psychology and Counseling. 1 (2). Association for Spiritual Psychology and Counseling. doi:10.12738/spc.2016.2.0014. ISSN 2458-9675.
- Geertz, Clifford (1976). The religion of Java. University of Chicago Press. ISBN 9780226285108.
- Schimmel, Annemarie (1975). Mystical Dimensions of Islam. The University of North Carolina Press. p. 130. ISBN 978-967-5062-04-9.
- Nasr, Seyyed Hossein (1973). Sufi Essays. Albany: State University of New York Press. ISBN 0-87395-233-2.
