= Toshio Kuroda (Islamic professor) =

- Died: May 6, 2018

Philosophical work
- Era: Contemporary philosophy
- Region: Islamic philosophy
- Main interests: Islamic philosophy

Toshio Kuroda (August 27, 1933 - May 6, 2018) was Professor Emeritus of the International University of Japan of Islamic studies and translated many Islamic texts into Japanese. He was part of a group of academics invited to research Islamic topics at the Imperial Iranian Academy of Philosophy in Tehran in 1974. There he studied and researched under the guidance of Seyyed Hossein Nasr, Toshihiko Izutsu and Henry Corbin.

== Life and academic career ==
Kuroda was a researcher at the Imperial Iranian Academy of Philosophy founded in 1974 by Seyyed Hossein Nasr. He returned to Japan after the Iranian Revolution in 1979. Kuroda published and translated over twenty works in his career from French, English, and Arabic into Japanese. He translated the works of Henry Corbin, Seyyed Hossein Nasr, W. Montgomery Watt, Al-Ghazali, and Muhammad Baqir al-Sadr.

== Awards and honors ==
In 1974 received the Japan Translation Culture Award for his contribution of translating the "History of Islamic Philosophy" by Henry Corbin. In 2012 he won the Iran's Book of the Year Awards for the Japanese translation of Badayeh al-Hikmah (The Elements of Islamic Metaphysics) by Allameh Tabataba'i. He's also known for translating the Nahj al-balagha which is a book of sayings attributed to Imam Ali into Japanese.

== Death ==
Kuroda died in Japan on 6 May 2018 at the age of 84 and funeral was at Yoyogi Cemetery in Nishihara, Shibuya-ku, Tokyo.
