= The Eastern =

The Eastern may refer to:

- The Eastern (film), 2018 documentary film
- The Eastern (Raleigh), skyscraper in Raleigh, North Carolina
