= Dunya =

The world in Islam

In Islam, dunyā (Arabic: دُنْيا) refers to the world and its earthly concerns and possessions. In the Quran, "dunya" is often paired with the word "life" to underscore the temporary and fleeting nature of the life of this world, as opposed to the eternal realm of the afterlife, known as "akhirah".

According to the Quran, humans and other communities have a limited time on earth before they pass on to the afterlife. In fact, the Quran teaches that everything that exists is temporary and will ultimately fade away. The pursuit of nearness to God is thus emphasized as the ultimate purpose in life, as only God's Being and Essence endure forever.

Prophetic traditions echo the Quranic teaching, emphasizing the importance of the afterlife, or "akhira" over the present world.

== Etymology ==
"Dunya" is an Arabic word that means "lower or lowest", or "nearer or nearest", which is understood as a reference to the "lower world, this world here below". The term "dunya" is employed to refer to the present world "as it is closest to one’s life as opposed to the life of the Hereafter". In the Quran, it is often used in conjunction with the word "life" to refer to this world, in contrast to the next, meaning the akhirah.

== In the Quran ==
The term "Al-dunyā" appears in the Quran 115 times and refers to both the temporal world and the duration of one's life on earth. The Quran emphasizes the temporary and fleeting nature of the life of this world compared to the eternal life of the next world. According to the Qur'an, human beings and other communities are on earth for a specific time period before they enter the afterlife. This period is known only to God and is referred to as "ajal musamma". "He it is who has created you out of clay, and then decreed a term [for you] – a term known [only] to Him . . ." (6.2). "For all people a term has been set: when the end of their term approaches, they can neither delay it by a single moment, nor hasten it" (10.49). While the world is primarily seen as a place where humans prepare for the afterlife, it can also bring fulfillment and be rewarding in its own right. Believers are advised to ask for goodness in both this world and the afterlife, as stated in 7:156: "And ordain for us what is good in this world (dunya) as well as in the life to come (akhirah)." However, the Qur'an warns against prioritizing the pleasures of this world over the rewards of the afterlife. It cautions against being deluded and distracted by the attractions and pleasures of this world, which can lead to forgetfulness of God and His promises. Those who seek rewards in the afterlife will receive an increase in their harvest, while those who focus solely on the world will have no share in the blessings of the afterlife.(42.20). In Surah 42, verse 20, the Quran says: "To the one who desires a harvest in the life to come (akhirah), We shall grant an increase in his harvest; whereas to the one who desires [but] a harvest in this world (dunya), We [may] give something thereof – [but] he will have no share in [the blessings of] the life to come (akhirah)" (42.20). Thus, in the Quran, the ultimate truth and reality lie in the closeness to God, and the enjoyment and adornment of this world is only a little thing compared to what awaits in the next world.

The Koran frequently tells us that the life of this world is ephemeral, either in so many words, or in parables such as the following: And strike for them the similitude of the life of this world: It is as water that We send down out of heaven, and the plants of the earth mingle with it, and in the morning it is straw that the winds scatter. (18:45) The Koran insists that dedicating oneself to straw is to squander away one's life and to dissipate one's human substance. People should not devote themselves to something that is utterly undependable. They should not act as if life's meaning is found in the affairs of this world, or as if experienced phenomena were anything other than the signs of God. Reality is not exhausted by what we see with our eyes. In short, the Koran says, do not be deluded by appearances: The life of this world is naught but a sport and a diversion.(18:45) Surely those who look not to encounter Us, and who are content with the life of this world and at peace with it, and those who are heedless of Our signs, those—their refuge is the Fire. (10:7)

— Sachiko Murata and William Chittick, The Vision of Islam, 1994

In the same vein, Quran 6:29 highlights the belief of some people who deny the possibility of an afterlife, saying "There is only the life of this world—we shall not be raised up." The verse suggests that if these people could see the reality of the afterlife, they would understand how wrong they were.

In Surah 28 verse 88, the Quran tells that "All things perish, save His (God's) Face". The same message is repeated several times as in 55:26-27: "All that is upon it passes away. And there remains the Face of thy Lord, Possessed of Majesty and Bounty." According to The Study Quran, these verses are "taken by most as a reference to the earth, the face of the earth, or this world in general, thus indicating that all of creation will eventually 'pass away'", only God's Being and Essence remains.

== In prophetic tradition ==
According to a prophetic tradition, "This world is the cultivating field for the other world", meaning that the consequences of a person's actions in this life will impact the state of that person's soul in the afterlife. In another hadith, the Prophet is reported to have said that even the person who had the most luxurious life in this world but ends up in the Fire will be brought before God on the Day of Resurrection and dipped once into the Fire. Then God will ask the person if he has ever experienced any good or bliss. The person will reply that he has not, indicating that the temporary pleasures of this world cannot be compared to the eternal consequences of the afterlife. Similarly, the person who had the most difficult life in this world but ends up in the Garden will be brought before God and dipped once into the Garden. Then God will ask the person if he has ever experienced any misery or hardship. The person will reply that he has not, emphasizing the incomparable joy and bliss of the next world.

== Modern usage ==
The term dunya is originally an Arabic word that derives from the root d-n-w (د ن و 'to bring near'). In that sense, dunya is "what is brought near". The term has spread to many other languages, particularly those with large groups of Muslim speakers. For example:

- donya/denya [ˈdonjæ, ˈdenjæ] in Egyptian Arabic
- dünya in Turkish
- dünya in Azerbaijani
- dynjaja in Albanian
- dinya (دىنیا) in Kurdish
- दुनिया (duniya) in Hindi, Marathi and Nepali
- দুনিয়া (duniẏā) in Bengali and Assamese
- ਦੁਨੀਆ (دُنیا, dunī'ā) in Punjabi
- દુનિયા (duniyā) in Gujarati
- دنیا (dunya) in Urdu, Sindhi and Punjabi
- دنیا (donyā) in Persian
- ντουνιάς (duniás) in Modern Greek
- duniya in Hausa
- duniyaaru in Adamawa Fulfulde
- duniah in Wakhi,
- dunia in Malay, Swahili and Indonesian
- donya in Javanese
- dünýä in Turkmen
- dunyo in Uzbek
- duunyo in Somali
- дунне (dunnye) in Udmurt
- aduna in Wolof

== Sources ==
- Tritton, A.S. (1991). "Dunyā". In Lewis, B.; Pellat, Ch.; Schacht, J. (eds.). Encyclopaedia of Islam. Brill.
- Carra de Vaux, B. (1908). "Dunyā". In Houtsma, M. Th.; Arnold, T. W.; Basset, R. (eds.). Encyclopaedia of Islam. Brill.
- Abrahamov, Binyamin (2006). "World". In McAuliffe, Jane Dammen (ed.). Encyclopaedia of the Qurʾān. Brill.
- Murata, S.; Chittick, W.C. (1994). The Vision of Islam: The Foundations of Muslim Faith and Practice. Visions of reality. I.B. Tauris. ISBN 978-1-86064-022-3.
- Nasr, S.H.; Dagli, C.K.; Dakake, M.M.; Lumbard, J.E.B.; Rustom, M. (2015). The Study Quran: A New Translation and Commentary -- Leather Edition. HarperCollins. ISBN 978-0-06-112588-1.
- Esack, F. (2005). The Qur'an: A User's Guide : a Guide to Its Key Themes, History and Interpretation. Oneworld. ISBN 978-1-85168-354-3.
- Nasr, S.H. (1989). Knowledge and the Sacred: Revisioning Academic Accountability. Gifford lectures. State University of New York Press. ISBN 978-0-7914-0176-7.
- Siddiqui, A.R. (2008). Qur'ānic Keywords: A Reference Guide. Islamic Foundation. ISBN 978-0-86037-446-6.
- Ghazali, A.H.A.; Abdussalam, N.; Conlan, M.M. (2016). Al-Ghazali's Adapted Summary of Ihya Ulum al-Din: The Forty Principles of the Religion. Turath Publishing. ISBN 978-1-906949-72-3.
