= Ilm (Arabic) =

Arabic term for knowledge

‘Ilm (Arabic: علم "knowledge") is the Arabic term for knowledge. In the Islamic context, 'ilm typically refers to religious knowledge. In the Quran, the term "ilm" signifies Allah's own knowledge, which encompasses both the manifest and hidden aspects of existence. The Quran emphasizes that all human knowledge is derived from God. Even angels acquire knowledge solely through divine intervention. Simultaneously, the Quran underscores the significance of actively seeking knowledge, a principle that is reiterated in the hadith literature as well.

In its general usage, 'ilm may refer to knowledge of any specific thing or proposition or any form of "learning". Subsequently, the term came to be used to refer to various categories of "sciences", especially when used in its plural form ('ulum).

== Root of the word ==
The Arabic term "'ilm" derives from the root "'-l-m".

== Meaning of 'ilm ==
'Ilm is commonly translated in English as "knowledge". Nevertheless, its interpretation can vary based on the specific context. It can encompass meanings such as "religious knowledge," "learning," or "science(s)," particularly when used in its plural form, "'ulum." According to the Encyclopaedia of Islam, "Ilm" is understood as the antithesis of "djahl," which means "ignorance." The word "ilm" is the most comprehensive term for "knowledge" in Arabic. While it is sometimes considered synonymous with "marifa" and "shuūr," there are notable distinctions in their usage. The verb associated with "ilm" takes one or two accusatives, indicating knowledge of a specific thing or proposition. On the other hand, "marifa" refers to acquiring knowledge through experience or reflection and implies prior ignorance. "Shuūr" denotes "perception". A "shāir" is a "perceiver," "feeler," and subsequently a "poet." This development created a clear distinction between the "ālim" and the "ārif" in another aspect. The "ārif" refers to the mystical knower who attains knowledge through immediate experience and vision, bearing similarities to the concept of a gnostic.

Ovamir Anjum, however, disputes the above views, saying that "The differentiation between ‘ilm as exoteric knowledge and ma’rifa as esoteric knowledge or gnosis had no etymological basis in earlier usage." He states that "In fact, the Qur’anic usage resists such a distinction, since it refers to the intimate human knowledge of God that produces a profound sentimental effect as nothing but 'ilm": “Truly, only the possessors of ‘ilm fear God” (Q. 35:28)."

Earlier, the term "ilm" was used to denote knowledge of specific and definite things. However, over time, the meaning of "ilm" expanded to include "science," and "al-ulūm" came to refer to "the sciences" in a broader sense. As a result, the term "ālim" (ulamā) began to be used to describe a scholar in a general sense, particularly one who engages in intellectual processes. This shift in meaning has faced strong criticism from Ghazālī in his work Iḥyā. Ghazālī strongly condemns the application of praises originally attributed to Allah being used to describe dialecticians and canon lawyers (fuḳahā). Subsequently, when "ilm" became intertwined with philosophy, it had to conform to the framework established by scholastic theologians known as the mutakallimūn. They incorporated it into the Aristotelian system of predicaments (al-maḳūlāt), assigning it a place within that framework.

Franz Rosenthal stated that "'ilm is Islam". Among the definitions of 'ilm (knowledge) compiled by Franz Rosenthal, Bruce Fudge mentions the following:

Knowledge is the process of knowing, and identical with the knower and the known.

1. Knowledge is that through which one knows.
2. Knowledge is that through which the essence is knowing.
3. Knowledge is that through which the knower is knowing.
4. Knowledge is that which necessitates for him in whom it subsists the name of knower.
5. Knowledge is that which necessitates that he in whom it subsists is knowing.
6. Knowledge is that which necessitates that he in whom it resides (mahall) is knowing.
7. Knowledge stands for ( 'ibarah 'an) the object known ( 'al-ma lum).
8. Knowledge is but the concepts known ( 'al-ma ani al-ma luma).
9. Knowledge is the mentally existing object."

— Bruce Fudge, Qur'ānic Hermeneutics: Al-Tabrisī and the Craft of Commentary, 2011

Louay M. Safi states that "Classical Muslim scholars defined knowledge ('ilm) as "the knowledge of the thing (shay') as it exists in itself". This definition can be traced back to a time when the Mu'tazilah were regarded as authorities in the field of kalām (Islamic theology). Al-Baqillani, the prominent proponent of the Ash'ari school of kalām, revised the definition by replacing the term "thing" (shay') with "knowable" (ma'lüm).

Early Muslim scholars distinguished between different levels of certainty in knowledge. Al Farra, for example, categorized knowledge into various degrees, ranging from 'ilm (scientific knowledge) as the highest level of certainty to jahl (ignorance) as the lowest. Scientific knowledge encompassed understanding the essence and intrinsic properties of a "thing" or its true nature. Ignorance, on the other hand, referred to knowledge that contradicted the essence of the thing. Between these two extremes, there were two intermediate levels of knowledge: shakk (skepticism), which occurred when two opposing interpretations were equally plausible, and zann (probable knowledge), which emerged when one interpretation was considered more likely.

...in the Islamic perspective there exists a hierarchy within the subject who knows. Man is not simply the Cartesian subject of the cogito who “‘knows” on the single level of what is called the mind. Man can know through the senses, through the imaginal faculty, through reason with its own several levels of activity, through the heart-intellect so often mentioned in the Qur’an and finally through revelation which is the objective counterpart of intellection with the eye of the heart (‘ayn al-qalb). As the final revelation of the Word of God, the Qur’an contains all of knowledge in principle precisely because it stands at the apex of the hierarchy of modes and sources of knowing followed again in a hierarchic manner by other modes of knowing.

— Seyyed Hossein Nasr, Foreword in Classification of Knowledge in Islam, 1998

According to Seyyed Hossein Nasr, "ʿilm is inherently religious". He argues that the Quranic revelation, which holds great significance in Islamic knowledge, is primarily characterized by its sacred quality and divine nature. Nasr further emphasizes that God is the creator of both the objects of knowledge and the human intellect, which is a divine gift enabling individuals to perceive and comprehend those objects of knowledge.

=== Classification of knowledge ===
Classical Muslim scholars often treated ʿilm not only as knowledge in a general sense, but also as a category that could be classified according to its source, method, purpose, and legal or ethical status. In al-Ghazālī’s classification, knowledge was discussed through several divisions, including theoretical and practical sciences, presential and acquired knowledge, religious and intellectual sciences, and knowledge whose acquisition is considered individually obligatory (farḍ ʿayn) or communally obligatory (farḍ kifāyah). These classifications connected the pursuit of knowledge with both personal religious duty and the wider needs of the Muslim community.

== In the Quran ==
According to Franz Rosenthal, it "is the obvious assumption throughout the Qurân that human knowledge, that is, true human knowledge, is to be equated with religious insight". The root "l-m" and its derivatives appear around 750 times in the Qur'an, accounting for approximately 1 percent of the total 78,000 words in the Qur'an. The first revelation received by Muhammad instructed him to proclaim or read in the name of his Lord and acknowledge God as the teacher of humanity. It stated that God, who taught through the use of the Pen, enlightened mankind with knowledge that they did not possess before (Q 96:1, 4-5). This event established a fundamental principle in Islam that underscores the critical role of learning and knowledge. In the Qur'an, the notion of "ilm" (knowledge) is depicted in a hierarchical fashion, placing it under the sovereignty and control of God. The term "ilm" refers to God's knowledge, which surpasses that of humans, encompassing hidden and undisclosed matters (Qur'an 6:59; 11:31). All human knowledge is derived from God, as stated in the Qur'an (Qur'an 2:140), and even angels possess knowledge only through what God has taught them (Qur'an 2:32). Divine knowledge can only be known if God allows it to be known (Qur'an 2:255-256).

The Qur'an emphasizes repeatedly that God is all-knowing (alīm), possessing knowledge that humans do not and having knowledge of the unseen (ālim al-ghayb, allām al-ghayb). The term all-knowing (alīm) is mentioned frequently, usually accompanied by all-wise (hakīm) and all-hearing (samī). In one of the verses, the Quran states that "above every person who has knowledge is the all-knowing" (q 12:76). In the Quran, every occurrence of the term "knower" (ālim [sing.]), the word used later for a learned scholar, is always followed by "unseen" (ghayb), referring to God Himself. While there are references to "those with knowledge" in the plural (ālimūn, ulamā) and various expressions indicating human knowledge and understanding (such as ūlū l-albāb or al-rāsikhūn fī l-ilm), there is an overwhelming presence of God's supremacy and omniscience.

== In Prophetic traditions ==
The significance of knowledge or 'ilm is greatly emphasized in the teachings of Muhammad, as reflected in various hadiths attributed to him, including:

- "He who pursues the road of knowledge God will direct to the road of Paradise."
- ”Learning a chapter of knowledge is better than a thousand rakah's of nafl prayer, and pursuing a chapter of knowledge whether it be put into practice or not, is better than a hundred nafl rakahs”
- “This world is cursed, as is everything in it, except for remembrance of Allah (dhikr) and what he likes (righteous deeds etc), and a scholar or a student.”
- “The believer will never have enough of listening to good things (seeking knowledge) until he reaches Paradise.”
- "The brightness of a learned man compared to that of a mere worshipper is like that of the full moon compared to all the stars."
- "Obtain knowledge; its possessor can distinguish right from wrong; it shows the way to Heaven; it befriends us in the desert and in solitude, and when we are friendless; it is our guide to happiness; it gives us strength in misery; it is an ornament to friends, protection against enemies."
- "The scholar’s ink is holier than the martyr’s blood."
- "Seeking knowledge is required of every Muslim."

== See also ==
- Hikmah
- Fitra
- Ulema
- Wissenschaft
- Wa qul rabbi zidni ilma

== Sources ==
- Bukhari, Syed Mehboob (2019). "The Islamisation of ʿilm: Ideals and realities in a globalised world". In Akkach, S. (ed.). 'Ilm: Science, Religion and Art in Islam. University of Adelaide Press. ISBN 978-1-925261-75-2.
- Furlow, Christopher A. (2020). "`ilm is Islam: The Islamic Concept of Knowledge from Classical Traditions to Modern Interpretations". In Daneshgar, M.; Hughes, A.W. (eds.). Deconstructing Islamic Studies. Mizan series. Harvard University Press. ISBN 978-0-674-24468-9.
- Fudge, B. (2011). Qur'ānic Hermeneutics: Al-Tabrisī and the Craft of Commentary. Routledge studies in the Qurʼān. Routledge. ISBN 978-0-415-78200-5.
- Safi, Louay M. (1997). "Towards an Islamic Theory of Knowledge". Islamic Studies. 36 (1). Islamic Research Institute, International Islamic University, Islamabad: 39–56. ISSN 0578-8072. JSTOR 23076081.
- Mahdi, Muhsin (1994). "Religious Belief and Scientific Belief". American Journal of Islamic Social Sciences. 11 (2): 245–259. doi:10.35632/ajis.v11i2.2430.
- Walker, Paul E. (2003). "Knowledge and Learning" in the "Encyclopedia of the Quran", Vol 3 J-O.
- Macdonald, D. B. (1927). "ʿIlm". In Houtsma, M. Th.; Arnold, A. J.; Wensinck, R. (eds.). Encyclopaedia of Islam. Brill.
- Nasr, Seyyed Hossein; Bakar, O. (1998). Classification of Knowledge in Islam: A Study in Islamic Philosophies of Science. Islamic Texts Society. ISBN 978-0-946621-71-2.
- Anjum, Ovamir; al-Jawziyya, I.Q. (2020). "Translator's Introduction". Ranks of the Divine Seekers: A Parallel English-Arabic Text. Volume 1. Islamic Translation Series. Brill. ISBN 978-90-04-41341-2.
- Rosenthal, F.; Gutas, D. (2007). Knowledge Triumphant: The Concept of Knowledge in Medieval Islam. Brill Classics in Islam. Brill. ISBN 978-90-04-15386-8.
