= Four Doors =

Concept in Sufism

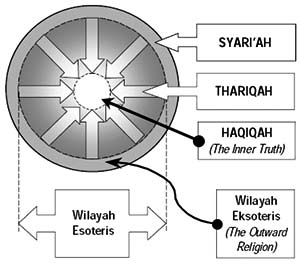
Four Spiritual Stations in Alevi tariqat: Sharia, tariqa, haqiqa, and marifa. Marifa is considered "unseen", and is actually the center of the haqiqa region.

Four Doors is a concept in Sufism and in branches of Islam heavily influenced by Sufism such as Isma'ilism and Alevism. In this system, there are four paths to God, starting with Sharia (exoteric path), then to Tariqa (esoteric path), then to Marifa (mystical knowledge), and then finally to Haqiqa (truth).

In Alevism, ten stations are listed for each of the Foor Doors. Hence, in full, the Four Doors are also known as the Four Doors and Forty Stations (Turkish: Dört Kapı Kırk Makam). These Forty Stations are listed below.

== The Door of Shari'ah ==
1. The Door of Sharîʻah/Divine Law

1. to believe
2. to learn knowledge (‘ilm)
3. to worship
4. to earn only what sustenance is permitted (halâl) by its creator in a way that is also permissible
5. abstaining from that which one's creator has forbidden (harâm)
6. to perform marriages / to marry oneself
7. to abstain from sexual relation during inappropriate times
8. to be a member of the community following the tradition of Muhammad
9. to be compassionate, to dress simply and to consume simple foods
10. to enjoin that which is right and abstain from that which is wrong

== The Door of Tariqah ==
2. The Door of Tarîqah/Sufi Path

1. taking the hand of a Sufi sheikh and repenting
2. willfully becoming a disciple (murîd) of a Sufi sheikh
3. keeping one's clothes, hair: beard both clean and in order
4. struggling against the desires of one's flesh (nafs)
5. serving others
6. being in a state between excessive fear and hope
7. taking lessons from and providing guidance to others
8. distributing God's bounties to others
9. reaching a state of intense love and a high level of enthusiasm
10. seeing his inner essence as poor

== The Door of Ma'rifah ==
3. The Door of Ma'rifah/Divine Knowledge

1. proper morals (adab)
2. fear
3. abstinence
4. patience and frugality
5. feeling embarrassment
6. generosity
7. knowledge (‘ilm)
8. intense poverty
9. maʻrifah
10. knowing oneself

== The Door of Haqiqah ==
4. The Door of Haqîqah/Truth

1. becoming earth
2. not scorning the 72 nations of humanity
3. being as merciful and compassionate as possible
4. not seeing anyone's faults
5. to be in agreement with the principles of singleness, uniqueness: oneness of God (tawhîd)
6. Guarding and not revealing the divine secrets (kitmân al-sirr)
7. following a specific spiritual path (sayr-i sulûk)
8. secret (sirr)
9. beseeching God (munâjât)
10. witnessing God's manifestation in creation (mushâhadah)
