= Christian Bonaud =

Islamologist (1957–2019)

- Yaḥyā ʿAlawī
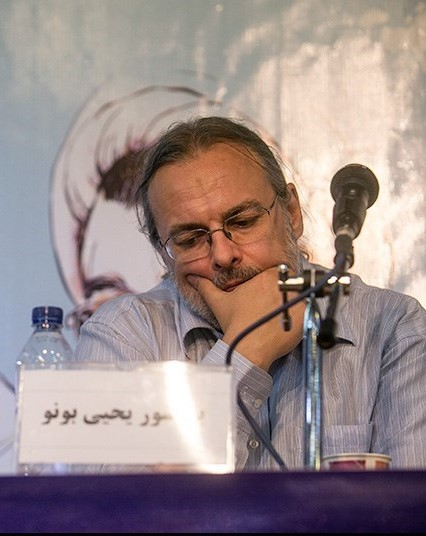
- Born: 1957; Freiburg im Breisgau, Germany
- Died: 26 August 2019 (aged 61–62); Abidjan, Ivory Coast
- Occupations: Islamologist, philosopher, writer, translator
- Writing career
- Language: French, German, English, Persian, Arabic
- Period: 1979–2019
- Notable works: L'Imam Khomeyni, un gnostique méconnu du XXe siècle

Yahya Christian Bonaud (1957 – 26 August 2019), also known as Yaḥyā ʿAlawī (or Yaḥyā Bonaud) was a French Islamologist, philosopher, writer, translator, commentator of the Qur'an in French, and a professor at the Jāmī Theological Center at Al-Mustafa International University in Iran.

== Early life ==
Christian Bonaud was born in 1957 into a Catholic family in Freiburg im Breisgau, Germany. They lived in (Germany) and Algeria until he was ten-years old, then moved to Strasbourg.

Influenced by the works of René Guénon, a French Sufi metaphysician, Bonaud converted to Islam in 1979. He began to study Arabic. Studying Islamology eventually led him to the writings of Henry Corbin (1903–1978) about Shia Islam.

Under the guidance of Amadou Hampâté Bâ (c. 1900/1901–1991), an African gnostic and spiritual leader of the Tijaniyyah, he converted to Shia Islam and adopted the name Yahya Alawi (Arabic: يَحْيیٰ عَلَوِي, romanized: Yaḥyā ʿAlawī). Bonaud did his doctoral dissertation in French on Ruhollah Khomeini, which was reprinted and published as the book L'Imam Khomeyni, un gnostique méconnu du XXe siècle ("Imam Khomeini, an unknown gnostic of the 20th century"). While writing his thesis, he spent seven years in Iran studying under the guidance of Sayyed Jalal-ed-Din Ashtiani.

=== Death ===
He died at sea in Abidjan, Ivory Coast in a marine accident on Monday, 26 August 2019. He was making a visit to the African continent to address Muslims about the month of Muharram and the guiding principles of Husayn ibn Ali. His body was transferred to Mashhad, Iran (where he had lived for fifteen–years prior) for his funeral rites and burial. He was 62 years old.

== Works ==
- L'Imam Khomeyni, un gnostique méconnu du XXe siècle [Imam Khomeini, an unknown gnostic of the 20th century] (in French). ALBOURAQ. 1997. ISBN 978-2841610471.
- French translation of the Qur'an
- Le soufisme: Al-tasawwuf et la spiritualité islamique (in French). 1991.
- Rituals of the Islamic Revolution
