= Toshio Kuroda =

Toshio Kuroda may refer to:

- Toshio Kuroda (Islamic professor)
- Toshio Kuroda (Shinto professor)
