= The Seeker of Orient =

2019 Iranian film by Masoud Taheri

- Directed by: Masoud Taheri
- Written by: Masoud Taheri
- Produced by: Chehrdad Film; Documentary and Experimental Film Center (DEFC)
- Release date: 2019
- Running time: 110 minutes
- Country: Iran
- Languages: French, Persian

The Seeker of Orient or The Orientalist is a 2019 documentary film directed by Masoud Taheri which deals with the life, works and thoughts of Henry Corbin.

== Production ==
This film is a product of Chehardad Film and the Documentary and Experimental Film Center (DEFC), and the filmmakers have traveled to six countries to prepare it: France (twice), Switzerland, Italy, Turkey (twice), America and Japan.

== Interviewees ==
Philosophers and scholars like Mohammad Ali Amirmoezi, Christian Jambet, Pierre Lory, Daniel Proulx, Yann Richard, Jean-Claude Carrière, Michel Cassé, Nahal Tajaddod, Hermann Landolt, Jean-Francois Perouse, Seyed Hossein Nasr, Dariush Shaygan, Karim Mojtahedi, Enshallah Rahmati, Shahram Pazuki, Hassan Seyedarab, Mostafa Malekian, Gholamhossein Ebrahimi Dinani, Bahman Zakipour, Alireza Saati and Sadegh Pulestios are featured in the film.

== Reception ==
This film was screened on February 7, 2018, with the attendance of Philippe Thiébaud, the then French ambassador to Iran, at Ivan Shams. A review session for this documentary was held on February 8, 2018 at the National Archives and Library Organization, with Inshallah Rahmati, Ehsan Shariati, and Reza Kohken discussing the film. Reza Koohkan believes that some aspects of Corbin's life have been neglected in this film. Ehsan Shariati, while praising the documentary, believes that the filmmaker did not have access to some research sources at the Sorbonne University about Corbin.

Yaser Mirdamadi also discussed the film in a review on the BBC Persian website. He considers one of the interesting points of the film to be Daniel Proulx's statements about Corbin's membership in Freemasonry. Morteza Karder also wrote a review about the film in Hamshahri newspaper. He believes that the film "does not go to repetitive characters to hear the usual words".
