= Faculties of the soul =

The faculties of the soul are the individual characteristics attributed to a soul. There have been different attempts to define them over the centuries.

== Plato, Aristotle and their followers ==
Plato defined the faculties of the soul in terms of a three-fold division: the intellect (noûs), the nobler affections (thumós), and the appetites or passions (epithumetikón) Aristotle also made a three-fold division of natural faculties, into vegetative, appetitive and rational elements, though he later distinguished further divisions in the rational faculty, such as the faculty of judgement and that of cleverness (deinotes).

Islamic philosophers continued his three-fold division; but later Scholastic philosophers defined five groups of faculties (dunámeis):

- the "vegetative" faculty (threptikón), concerned with the maintenance and development of organic life
- the appetite (oretikón), or the tendency to any good
- the faculty of sense perception (aisthetikón)
- the "locomotive" faculty (kinetikón), which presides over the various bodily movements
- reason (dianoetikón)

== Calvin ==
John Calvin opposed the scholastic philosophers, favoring a two-fold division of the soul, consisting of intellect and of will.

== Faculty psychology ==
The secularisation of the Age of Enlightenment produced a faculty psychology of different but inherent mental powers such as intelligence or memory, distinct (as in Aristotelianism) from the acquired habits.

== See also ==
- 'Aql (rational faculty in Islamic philosophy)
- Jerry Fodor
- Phrenology
- Psychology
- Rational animal
- Thomism
- Trichotomy
