= Zulm =

Unjust and sinful acts in Islam

Ẓulm (ظلم, Ẓulm) is the Arabic word used interchangeably for cruelty or unjust acts of exploitation, oppression, and wrongdoing, whereby a person either deprives others of their rights or does not fulfill his obligations towards them. It is used in Urdu and Hindi in the same sense. In Turkish, it is known as zulüm and other cognates of this word are prevalent in several Semitic and Indo-European languages.

A person who commits zulm is called a "zaalim".

In the Islamic context injustice or acts of cruelty are attributed to human acts and not to Allah: God does not do injustice to anyone. It is the people who do injustice to themselves.

== See also ==
- Ghaflah
