= Fitra =

Innate human nature in Islam

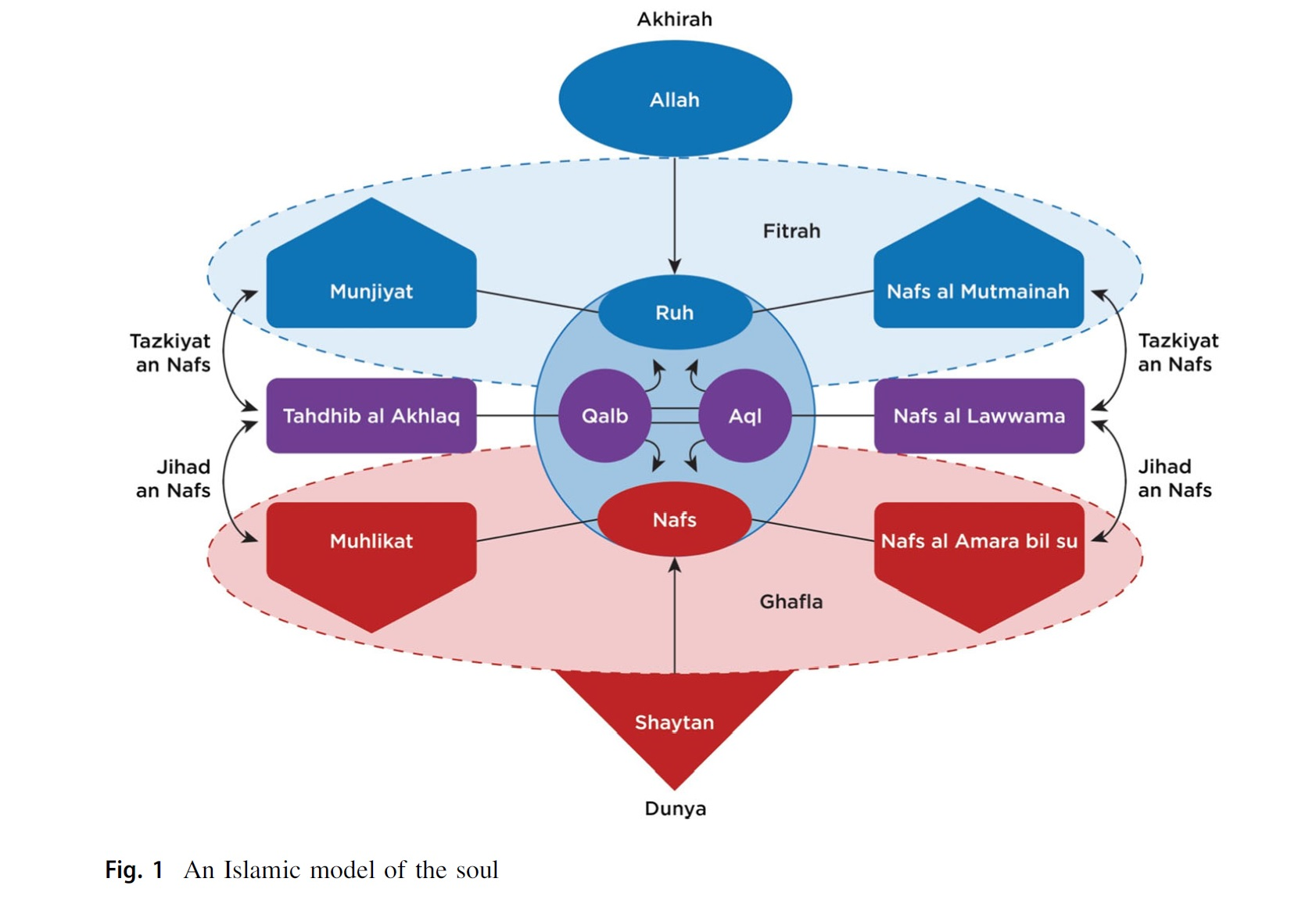
A visual rendition of the Islamic model of the soul showing the region of fitra relative to other concepts based on a consensus of 18 surveyed academic and religious experts.

Fitra or fitrah (Arabic: فِطْرَة; ALA-LC: fiṭrah) is an Arabic word that means 'original disposition', 'natural constitution' or 'innate nature'. The concept somewhat resembles natural order in philosophy, although there are considerable differences as well. In Islam, fitra is the innate human nature that recognizes the oneness of God (tawhid). It may entail either the state of purity and innocence in which Muslims believe all humans to be born, or the ability to choose or reject God's guidance. The Quran states that humans were created in the most perfect form (95:4), and were endowed with a primordial nature (30:30). Furthermore, God took a covenant from all children of Adam, even before they were sent to earthly life, regarding his Lordship (7:172–73). This covenant is considered to have left an everlasting imprint on the human soul, with the Quran emphasizing that on the Day of Judgment no one will be able to plead ignorance of this event (7:172–73).

Fitra is also associated with the divine spirit that God, according to the Quran, breathed into Adam (15:29, 32:9, 38:72). This means that the fitra represents the true essence of Adam, who was taught all the names by God (2:31). In the Quran, fitra is linked to the concept of hanif (30:30); a term that is often associated with Abraham but it also includes individuals who turn away from erroneous beliefs and instead embrace faith in the unity of God.

This teaching is echoed in prophetic traditions that reiterate the existence of intrinsic human nature at birth. Hence, in Islamic belief, humans are deemed blessed to have the ability to comprehend and affirm the existence of God. However, over time, people tend to disregard and overlook their innate nature, causing it to become obscured and deeply buried within them. In that vein, Islam is perceived as a means to assist individuals in rediscovering and reconnecting with their original nature, ultimately re-establishing their primordial relationship with God.

According to the Maturidi scholar Abu al-Layth al-Samarqandi, jinn are also endowed with fitra, and thus mandated to observe God's law.

== Etymology ==
Fitra is an Arabic word that is usually translated as "original disposition", "natural constitution", or "innate nature". The root verb F-Ṭ-R means to split or cleave, also found in Iftar (breaking the fast), Eid al-Fitr, and in the 82nd chapter of the Quran (Surah Al-Infitar - The Splitting). Arabic lexicographers also relate it to create. Fatir is usually translated as originator or creator, and thus fitra is also considered to refer to the "state of creation".

== Quranic narratives and interpretations ==
According to The Study Quran, the fiṭrah or primordial nature mentioned in the Quran (30:30) refers to the inherent and natural recognition of the oneness of God that exists within every human being. This recognition represents the essence of what it means to be human in the Islamic tradition.

In surah 30 of the Quran, the word fitra is used in the context of the following verse:

"Set thy face to religion as a Hanif in the primordial nature from God upon which He originated mankind—there is no altering the creation of God; that is upright but most mankind know not."

— Sura Ar-Rum, verse 30, The Study Quran, 2015

The above verse (30:30) links fitra to the concept of Hanif, which "is understood by most to mean in a straight and upstanding manner, neither inclining nor adhering to past religions that have been altered or abrogated". In the Quran, the term "Hanif" is often used in relation to Abraham, but in a broader sense, it refers to someone who turns away from misguidance and instead embraces faith in the unity of God. If the term "fitra" is understood to mean "divide", it might signify that God separates his creation into believers and unbelievers by means of the "true religion".

According to Seyyed Hossein Nasr, Islam views humans as inherently possessing a primordial nature known as al-fitrah. Despite its existence, this nature can become obscured and deeply buried within individuals as a result of neglect and forgetfulness. The Quran recognizes that humans were created in the best possible form (ahsan altaqwim) (95:4), with the intelligence necessary to recognize and know God. Islamic message is thus directed towards this fundamental nature of humanity, ultimately seeking to revive and rejuvenate it.

[The message of Islam] is a call for recollection, for the remembrance of a knowledge kneaded into the very substance of our being even before our coming into this world. In a famous verse that defines the relationship between human beings and God, the Quran, in referring to the precosmic existence of man, states, “‘Am I not your Lord?’ They said: ‘Yes, we bear witness’” (7:172). The “they” refers to all the children of Adam, male and female, and the “yes” confirms the affirmation of God’s Oneness by us in our pre-eternal ontological reality. Men and women still bear the echo of this “yes” deep down within their souls, and the call of Islam is precisely to this primordial nature, which uttered the “yes” even before the creation of the heavens and the earth. The call of Islam therefore concerns, above all, the remembrance of a knowledge deeply embedded in our being, the confirmation of a knowledge that saves, hence the soteriological function of knowledge in Islam.

— William Chittick, The Essential Seyyed Hossein Nasr, 2007

According to Quran 7:172–73, God called upon all souls to witness His lordship before being sent to the world so that no one could plead ignorance on the Day of Judgment. ""Lest you say on the Day of Resurrection, "As for us, we were heedless of this," or lest you say, 'Our fathers associated others with God before us, and we were their offspring after them. What, wilt Thou destroy us for what the vain-doers did?'". Some commentators, including al Razi, have argued that the inability of humans to recall the pretemporal covenant mentioned in Quran 7:172–73 implies that it is symbolic and therefore cannot be the basis of human responsibility. However, The Study Quran suggests that this event should be viewed within the wider context of the Quran and its prophetic history. According to the Study Quran, "this pretemporal recognition of God’s Lordship can be understood as creating an innate disposition in human beings toward recognizing and worshipping God during earthly life and toward accepting the prophets and the messages they bring as “reminders” of what human beings already know inwardly, but have merely forgotten."

According to this perspective, those who reject the prophets are doing so out of willful ignorance, and are denying truths that "should, in any sincere and morally uncorrupted soul, resonate with a deep but forgotten knowledge of God that nevertheless still exists within them". Even though humans have forgotten it, they still possess an innate knowledge of God that is often covered up by their disbelief. This is reflected in the term "kuffār," which means "disbelievers" but which also etymologically refers to the idea of covering up the truth. The pretemporal covenant, along with God sending messengers to all people, is said to serve as a "proof" against those who reject the prophetic messages. This is because they are denying something that they already know to be true deep within themselves, and are therefore acting in a capricious or cynical manner.

According to William Chittick, "Fitra is the divine form that God bestowed upon Adam when He created him; or, it is the divine spirit that, according to the Koran, God blew into the clay of Adam in order to bring him to life". In the Qur'an, the spirit that was breathed into Adam by God is referred to with the pronouns "His" (32:9) and "My" (15:29, 38:72). This spirit is known as the "attributed spirit" (al-ruh al-idafi), which implies that it has both divine and human characteristics. The spirit that God blew into Adam possesses spiritual and angelic attributes such as luminosity, subtlety, awareness, and oneness. The fitra thus constitutes "the very self of Adam to whom God “taught all the names” (2:31)". It is considered to be the foundation of human wisdom and knowledge, as it inclines naturally towards the belief in the oneness of God, which is the essence of tawhid. This belief is the basis for true understanding of God, the universe, and the self.

== In prophetic traditions ==
In the prophetic traditions (hadith), the term gets new attention: "Every child is born in a state of fitrah. His parents then make him a Jew, a Christian or a Magian, just as an animal is born intact. Do you observe any among them that are maimed (at birth)." According to a hadith qudsi, God says: "I created my servants Hunafa (i.e., monotheists), then the Shayatin misled them from their religion." In another tradition, the Prophet is reported to have said: “The fitrah is five things, or five things are part of the fitrah: circumcision, shaving the pubic hairs, plucking the armpit hairs, clipping the nails and trimming the moustache.”

== In theology ==
The Mu'tazilites argue that Islamic law is rational and given to every born child, thus fitra is identified with Islam. This viewpoint was also adapted by several canonical traditions. In others however, fitra refers to the pre-Islamic religion, originating in Adam, before any religious obligations have been revealed.

=== Abu al-Layth al-Samarqandi ===
According to the Maturidi scholar (ʿĀlim) Abu al-Layth al-Samarqandi, humans and jinn are created with fitra, and thus obligated (taklīf) to follow God's law. It encompasses the ideas that humans are born pure and innocent, and that they possess an innate capacity to choose or reject God's guidance.

== Revival of fitra ==
According to William Chittick, the Quran and the Hadith suggest that humans possess an innate capacity to understand reality as it is, but their environment obscures this ability. Prophets' role is to remind (dhikr) people of the knowledge they already have, while humans just need to remember (dhikr) it. Once they recall and acknowledge this knowledge, they can reconnect with their innate capacity for understanding reality. This capacity has always been a part of them, deeply embedded within their nature, and has never truly been separate from their being.

== Comparison with other concepts ==
The concepts of Fitra in Islam and Buddha-nature in Buddhism reveal striking similarities despite their different origins. Fitra denotes an inherent purity and natural inclination towards recognizing and worshipping Allah, emphasizing the innate goodness and moral compass within every human. Buddha-nature, prominent in Mahayana Buddhism, signifies the inherent potential for enlightenment in all sentient beings, embodying pure consciousness, wisdom, and compassion.

Both concepts highlight a universal attribute: Fitra and Buddha-nature apply to all humans and sentient beings, respectively, suggesting an intrinsic spiritual potential. They also acknowledge that this purity can be obscured—Fitra by sin and misguidance, and Buddha-nature by ignorance and defilements—but can be restored through spiritual practice and ethical living.

== See also ==
- 'Aql
- Nafs
- Sensus divinitatis
- Natural law
- Natural order
- Qalb
- Ritual purity in Islam
- Rūḥ
- Shuddhi
- State of Nature

== Sources ==
- Chittick, William (1998). "Between the Yes and the No: Ibn al-'Arabi on Wujud and the Innate Capacity". In Forman, R.K.C. (ed.). The Innate Capacity: Mysticism, Psychology, and Philosophy. Oxford University Press. ISBN 978-0-19-511697-7.
- Nasr, S.H.; Chittick, W.C. (2007). The Essential Seyyed Hossein Nasr. Library of perennial philosophy The perennial philosophy series. World Wisdom. ISBN 978-1-933316-38-3.
- Nasr, S.H.; Dagli, C.K.; Dakake, M.M.; Lumbard, J.E.B.; Rustom, M. (2015). The Study Quran: A New Translation and Commentary – Leather Edition. HarperCollins. ISBN 978-0-06-112588-1.
- Chittick, William (2007). "The Traditional Approach to Learning". Sacred Web. 18: 29–47.
- Chittick, W.C. (2007a). Science of the Cosmos, Science of the Soul: The Pertinence of Islamic Cosmology in the Modern World. Oneworld Publications. ISBN 978-1-85168-495-3.
- Chittick, W.C. (1989). The Sufi Path of Knowledge: Ibn al-Arabi's Metaphysics of Imagination. G - Reference, Information and Interdisciplinary Subjects Series. State University of New York Press. ISBN 978-0-88706-885-0.
- Rothman, Abdallah; Coyle, Adrian (2018). "Toward a Framework for Islamic Psychology and Psychotherapy: An Islamic Model of the Soul". Journal of Religion and Health. 57 (5). Springer Science and Business Media LLC: 1731–44. doi:10.1007/s10943-018-0651-x. ISSN 0022-4197. PMC 6132620. PMID 29907906.
- Murata, S.; Chittick, W.C. (1994). The Vision of Islam: The Foundations of Muslim Faith and Practice. Visions of reality. I.B. Tauris. ISBN 978-1-86064-022-3.
- Wensinck, A.J. (2013). The Muslim Creed: Its Genesis and Historical Development. Taylor & Francis. ISBN 978-1-135-03009-4.
- Mohamed, Yasien (1995). "The Interpretations of Fițrah". Islamic Studies. 34 (2). Islamic Research Institute, International Islamic University, Islamabad: 129–51. ISSN 0578-8072. JSTOR 20840202.
- al-Samarkandi, N.M.; Daiber, H. (1995). شرح الفقه الابسط لأبي حنيفة: Abū L-Lait̲ As-Samarqandī's Commentary on Abū Ḥanīfa (died 150/767) Al-Fiqh Al-absaṭ. Studia culturae Islamicae (in Arabic). Institute for the Study of Languages and Cultures of Asia and Africa.
- Abdul-Rahman, M.S. (2003). Islam: Questions and Answers: Pedagogy Education and Upbringing. Islam : questions and answers. MSA Publication Limited. ISBN 978-1-86179-298-3.
- Abdul-Rahman, M.S. (2009). Tafsir Ibn Kathir Juz' 21 (Part 21): Al-Ankaboot 46 to Al-Azha. MSA Publication Limited. ISBN 978-1-86179-733-9.
