= Iranian Research Institute of Philosophy =

Public research institute in Tehran

- مؤسسه پژوهشی حکمت و فلسفه ایران
- Type: Public research institute
- Established: September 1974
- Founders: Seyyed Hossein Nasr
- President: Askar Dirbaz
- Location: Tehran, Tehran, Iran
- Campus: Urban
- Website: www.irip.ac.ir/en/home

The Iranian Research Institute of Philosophy (IRIP; Persian: مؤسسه پژوهشی حکمت و فلسفه ایران) is a public research institute in Tehran, Iran.

== History ==
In September 1974, Farah Pahlavi Empress of Iran commissioned Seyyed Hossein Nasr, Head of the Empress's Private Bureau, to establish and lead the Imperial Iranian Academy of Philosophy. It was the first academic institution to be founded upon the principles of philosophical Traditionalism. Nasr was a Professor of History of Science and Philosophy at University of Tehran who also served for several years as president of Sharif University of Technology in Iran. The main objectives of the institute were to present and promote the Iranian intellectual and philosophical heritage of the Islamic and pre-Islamic ears at national and international levels, to improve the presentation of Eastern and Western intellectual traditions to Iranian and the abroad, and to make the necessary preparations for comparative study of different philosophical traditions.

William Chittick, who is a renowned scholar of Sufi thought, literature, and Islamic philosophy, completed his PhD in Persian literature at Tehran University in 1974. He then taught comparative religion at the Humanities Department at Sharif University and left Iran just before the revolution in 1979. He was also for a short period before the revolution an assistant professor at it. He has also served as assistant editor of Encyclopædia Iranica and is currently professor of Religious Studies at the State University of New York at Stony Brook. Chittick has had collaborations with Hossein Nasr and Muhammad Husayn Tabatabai on several projects. Several renowned thinkers such as the late Jalal-ed-Din Homaei (1900-1980), Mahmoud Shahabi (1901-1986), Abbas Zaryab (1919-1995), and Yahya Mahdavi (1908-2000) were among the members of Board of Trustees of the institute.

After the Islamic revolution, the Institute of Philosophy was among those institutions which were able to continue its activities because of its rich background. In 1981, the institute was merged with eleven other research centers, constituting the Institute of Cultural Studies and Research. These centers were included the Foundations of Ferdowsi's Shahnameh, the Iran Culture Foundation, the Iran art and Culture Foundation, the Iran Communication, Science, and Development Research Institute, the Research Institute of Humanities, the Iran Academy of Art and Literature, the Iran Academy of Literature, the Iran Academy of Science, the Center of Asian Cultural Documents, the Iranian Center of Historical Research and the Iranian Center for Study of Cultures.

After the merger, the newly reorganized institute continued its entity in the same building within the framework of two research centers, “Philosophy and Religion” and “History and Philosophy of Science”. During this period, research activities of the institute were lessened and emphasis was placed on educational activities too. In 1997, in order to strengthen the institute's research achievements, the institute became independent from the Institute of Cultural Research and Studies and continued its activities under the new title, “The Iranian Society of Philosophy”. Since 2001, the institute has continued its activities within the framework of a totally independent Institute, with the title of “The Iranian Research Institute of Philosophy”. The institute received the authorization of the Ministry of Science, Research and Technology for establishing six new research departments: Western Philosophy, Islamic Philosophy, Science Studies, Religion and Mysticism, Logics and Kalam.

== Notable faculty members before 1979 Iranian Revolution ==
- William Chittick
- Henry Corbin
- Toshihiko Izutsu
- Sachiko Murata
- Peter Lamborn Wilson
