= Hikmah =

Concept of wisdom in Islamic philosophy

Hikmah (also Hikmat, Arabic: حكمة, ḥikma) is an Arabic word that means wisdom, sagacity, philosophy, rationale or underlying reason. The Quran mentions "hikmah" in various places, where it is understood as knowledge and understanding of the Quran, fear of God, and a means of nourishing the spirit or intellect. Hikmah is sometimes associated with prophethood, faith, intelligence ('aql), comprehension (fahm), or the power of rational demonstration. In the Quran, God bestows wisdom upon whomever He chooses, and various individuals including the House of Abraham, David, Joseph, Moses, Jesus, Muhammad and Luqman are said to have received wisdom. The Quran also uses the term hikmah in connection with the Book or the scripture in general. The Quran also refers to itself as the Wise Book, and refers to God as The Wise in several places.

Hadith literature also emphasizes the importance of acquiring hikmah, which is believed to have been reflected in the sunnah of the Prophet.

Ibn Sina believed that the concept of "hikmah" is intricately related to the actualization and refinement of the human soul. He described it as the process of achieving perfection of the human soul through the understanding of things and the assessment of both theoretical and practical truths according to human capacity. Mulla Sadra characterized hikmah as a means by which humans can attain a level of understanding that makes them resemble the objective world and align with the order of the universe. He categorized hikmah into two types - theoretical and practical. Theoretical hikmah pertains to faith, while practical hikmah pertains to good deeds. Fakhr al-Din al-Razi equated hikmah with kalam, while Seyyed Hossein Nasr linked it to sapiential knowledge. Hikmah has also been linked to intellectual sciences, particularly traditional philosophy.

On a more practical level, hikmah has been explained in several ways, such as acquiring knowledge through best of sciences, combining knowledge with action, having practical experience, applying fair judgment, understanding the true nature of things, avoiding ignorance, placing things in their proper context and assigning them their rightful status, and doing good deeds.

== Etymology ==
Hikmah is an Arabic word that means wisdom, sagacity, philosophy, rationale or underlying reason. Seyyed Hossein Nasr asserts that the Arabic term "hikmah" has a distinct meaning that does not align with modern European philosophy or theology. Rather, it is more closely related to the original Greek concept of theosophy. For Nasr, hikma is also sapiential because its meaning is related to the Latin word "sapere" and the Arabic word "dhawq," both of which mean "taste." Additionally, hikmah can be considered "speculative wisdom" because it seeks to make the human soul a mirror, reflecting divine knowledge, which is similar to the meaning of the Latin word "speculum," which means "mirror."

== In the Quran and exegetical traditions ==
The term "hikmah" is mentioned in various places of the Quran, but one of the most commonly cited is "He giveth wisdom [hikmah] unto whom He will, and he unto whom wisdom is given, he truly hath received abundant good". (2:269). In the Quran, God thus bestows wisdom upon whomever He chooses. In this context, "Wisdom" is interpreted to mean knowledge and understanding of the Quran, fear of God, intelligence ('aql), comprehension (fahm), the power of rational demonstration, or prophethood. Wisdom is believed to nourish the spirit or intellect. Although wisdom is not the same as right action, it combines understanding and right action. In the words of al-Zamakhshari, the starting point and cornerstone of all wisdom is the recognition and comprehension of the Oneness of God (tawḥīd).

In the Quran, the term "wisdom" is mentioned in several places alongside "the Book" or the Scripture. The Prophet Muhammad thus is reported to have been granted the Book and Wisdom (2:151; 3:164; 4:54). In 2:129 of the Quran, Abraham prays to God, asking Him to raise a messenger from among his people who will recite God's signs to them, teach them the Book and Wisdom, and purify them. This prayer is taken to be granted in 2:151, where it is stated that God sent a messenger from among his people who recites God's signs, purifies them, teaches them the Book and Wisdom, and also teaches them what they did not know. This messenger is understood to be Muhammad. According to the Study Quran, the term "wisdom" in 2:129 is understood as a reference to the Sunnah, which encompasses Muhammad's exemplary sayings and actions, or more generally to knowledge and understanding of the religion. However, the Study Quran notes that the Quranic pairing of the Book and Wisdom has a more universal significance, as it has been used in relation to other Quranic figures, such as Jesus (3:48; 5:110), the Children of Israel (45:16), and the House of Abraham (4:54). According to the Quran, God bestowed wisdom on many individuals, including David (2:251), Joseph (12:21), Moses (28:14), and Luqman, who is not considered a prophet by majority.

The Quran instructs people to invite others to God using wisdom (16:125), which can be understood as calling others to religion based on the revelation that has been received, using clear and truthful language, and presenting convincing evidence that brings intellectual certainty. Some scholars, such as al-Rāzī, consider the latter approach to be the most effective way of calling people to the way of God.

Moreover, the Quran refers to itself as the Wise Book in several places as in 10:1 and 31:2. In 3:58, it refers to itself as "The Wise Reminder" (al-dhikr al-ḥakīm). The Quran also refers to God as The Wise (al-Ḥakīm) in numerous places as in 31:9 (He is the Mighty, the Wise).

== In hadith literature ==
"Hikmah" also appears in Hadith literature, which comprises the teachings and sayings of Muhammad. One Hadith emphasizes that "the acquisition of hikmah is incumbent upon thee: verily the good resides in hikmah". Another Hadith cautions against speaking of "hikmah" to fools, stating "speak not of hikmah to fools."

== In theology and philosophy ==
Muslim authorities have disagreed on the meaning of hikmah in Quranic verses and prophetic sayings, with some like Fakhr al-Din al-Razi associating it with kalam. However, throughout Islamic history, many have linked hikmah to intellectual sciences, particularly traditional philosophy, and this field came to be known as "al-hikma al-ilahiyyah" or "theosophia" in its original sense in Persia. Various Islamic commentaries describe hikmah as "to know the best of things by way of the best of sciences ...", having experience, using "justice in judging", "knowledge of the reality of things", "that which prevents ignorance," and putting "things in their proper places, assigning them to their proper status". In Ibn Sina's view, "hikmah" is closely tied to the realization and perfection of the human soul, as he defines it as "the perfecting of the human soul through the conceptualization of things and the judgment of theoretical and practical truths to the measure of human capability". According to Seyyed Hossein Nasr, Ibn Sina's definition implies a "close accordance between knowledge and its practice", which became influential in later Islamic philosophy. Mulla Sadra defined hikmah as the tool through which "man becomes an intelligible world resembling the objective world and similar to the order of universal existence." Sadra suggests that Muhammad's prayer to God to "show us things as they really are" is referring to this concept of hikmah. In addition, Sadra explains the Quranic verse "Surely We created man of the best stature, then We reduced him to the lowest of the low, save those who believe and do good works" (95:4-6) by interpreting "the best stature" as the spiritual realm and the angelic part of the soul, and "the lowest of the low" as the material world and the animalistic aspect of the soul, while stating that "those who believe" refers to theoretical hikmah, and "those who do good works" alludes to practical hikmah. According to this viewpoint, hikmah involves both knowledge and action, and it rescues humans from their wretched state and restores them to a paradisial state. Mulla Sadra argues that hikmah is tied to religion and spiritual life, and it is distinct from Western philosophy, which focuses mainly on mental activities.

== In Islamic jurisprudence ==
As a term of fiqh (Islamic jurisprudence), Taqi Usmani describes it as "the wisdom and the philosophy taken into account by the legislator while framing the [Islamic] law or the benefit intended to be drawn by [the law's] enforcement". One Dr Dipertua calls it "the objectives and wisdom" as "prescribed by Shariah".

Usmani gives as an example the secular law for traffic lights, where illat (another term of fiqh meaning "the basic feature of a transaction that causes relevant law to be applied") is obedience to stopping at red lights, and hikmah is traffic safety—avoiding vehicle and pedestrian collisions.

== See also ==
- Chokmah
- Hikmat al-Ishraq
- Hikmat al-Muta’aliyah
- Irfan
- Ma'rifa
- Muʿtazila
- Ilm (Arabic)

== Sources ==
- Nasr, Seyyed Hossein (1973). "The Meaning and Role of "Philosophy" in Islam". Studia Islamica (37). JSTOR: 57–80. doi:10.2307/1595467. ISSN 0585-5292. JSTOR 1595467.
- Nasr, Seyyed Hossein; Dagli, C.K.; Dakake, M.M.; Lumbard, J.E.B.; Rustom, M. (2015). The Study Quran: A New Translation and Commentary. HarperCollins. ISBN 978-0-06-112588-1.
- Nasr, Seyyed Hossein (1996). Razavi, M.A. (ed.). The Islamic Intellectual Tradition in Persia. Curzon Press. ISBN 978-0-7007-0314-2.
