= Masoud Taheri =

Iranian film director

- مسعود طاهری
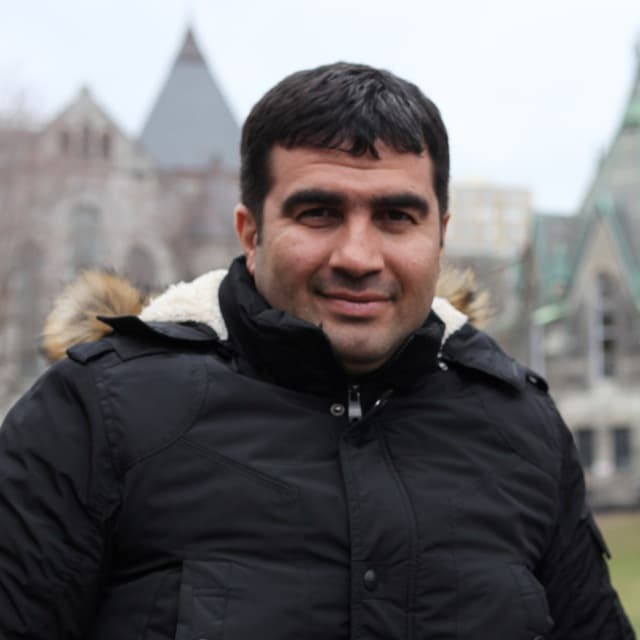
- Occupations: film director, screenwriter
- Years active: 1996-now
- Known for: documentary films on Iranian-Islamic philosophy
- Notable work: The Seeker of Orient; The Eastern

Masoud Taheri is an Iranian film director and writer. He is known for his documentary films on Iranian-Islamic thought and philosophy.

== Filmography ==
- The Professional (2024)
- Al Kafi (2023)
- Sayyed Jalal-ed-Din (2023)
- Moheyddin (2023)
- Kanze Din (Treasure of Faith) (2023)
- Najmeddin (2022)
- Nanjakoria (2022)
- The Seeker of Orient (2019)
- The Eastern (film) (2018)
- The Eastern Man (2017)
- Rahmat's Share (2011)
