= The New Encyclopedia of Islam =

The New Encyclopedia of Islam is a revised edition of the Concise Encyclopedia of Islam by Cyril Glassé, published in 1989 (2nd ed. 1991, revised ed. 2001) with Stacey International and AltaMira Press.

It is not to be confused with the Encyclopaedia of Islam.
