= The Eastern (film) =

2018 Iranian film by Masoud Taheri

- Directed by: Masoud Taheri
- Written by: Masoud Taheri
- Produced by: Chehrdad Film
- Release date: 2018
- Running time: 130 minutes
- Country: Iran
- Languages: 11 languages including English, Persian and Japanese

The Eastern or Sharghi is a 2018 documentary film written and directed by Masoud Taheri which deals with the life, works and thoughts of Toshihiko Izutsu. This film is the only documentary ever made about Izutsu.

== Production ==
The making of this film lasted for four years, shot in twelve countries, including Iran, Japan, France, Switzerland, Italy, Turkey, Canada, America, Syria, Spain, and Russia, and the interviewees speak eleven languages. In order to produce this film, interviews were conducted with about 120 people, and finally, after evaluation, the words of more than sixty people were included in the film.

== Reception ==
The review session for this documentary was held in August 2017 with Hassan Balkhari and Akbar Alami speaking at the Iranian National Library and Records Organization. Yaser Mirdamadi has discussed the film in an article on the BBC Persian website. Nahal Tajaddod wrote an article about this documentary in Shargh newspaper and considered the film to reveal "many mysteries" for herself. Apart from the premiere screening in Tokyo on July 24, 2018, and August 17, 2017, in Tehran, this film has been shown in numerous universities including Stanford, MIT, Oxford, Edinburgh, Ryukoku, Meiji, Shahid Beheshti, Qom Religions and Denominations, Science and Research Center, and London's Tawheed Center.
