= Hermann Landolt =

Swiss Islamic scholar

Hermann Landolt is a Swiss scholar of Iranian and Islamic philosophy and emeritus professor of Islamic thought at McGill University in Montreal, Quebec, Canada.

== Biography ==
Born in 1935 in Basel, Switzerland, Hermann Landolt studied at Ecole Pratique des Hautes Etudes in Sorbonne, Paris under prominent Islamicist Henry Corbin and obtained a PhD from the University of Basel under the supervision of Alfred Bühler and Fritz Meier. In 1960, Landolt visited Iran and had grown an intense interest in Iranian life and culture. Upon recommendation of Henry Corbin, he was invited to Canada in 1964 and was appointed a 'junior scholar' at McGill University. Besides McGill, Landolt has also served as a research fellow at the Institute of Ismaili Studies and had been a guest professor at Sorbonne.

== Works ==
Books

- An anthology of Ismaili literature: a Shiʻi vision of Islam (London; New York: I.B. Tauris; London: in association with the Institute of Ismaili Studies, 2008).
- Creation and Resurrection: An Early Muslim Perspective on Divine Unity and Cosmology (I.B. Tauris, 2015)
- Recherches en spiritualité iranienne (Tehran: IFRI, 2005)
- Nûruddîn Abdurrahmâ-i Isfaraâyinî, Le Révélateur des mystères. Traité de soufisme. Étude préliminaire, trad. du persan par H. Landolt (Paris: Gallimard, 2005)

Festschrift

- Todd Lawson (ed), Reason and inspiration in Islam: theology, philosophy and mysticism in Muslim thought: essays in honour of Hermann Landolt (London; New York: I.B. Tauris; London: in association with the Institute of Ismaili Studies; New York: Distributed in the United States by St Martin's Press, 2005).
