= Sayyed Jalal-ed-Din Ashtiani =

Iranian Ayatollah and philosopher (1925–2005)

- سید جلال‌الدین آشتیانی
- Born: 1925; Ashtian, Iran
- Died: 2005 (aged 79–80); Mashhad, Iran

Sayyed Jalal-ed-Din Ashtiani (Persian: سید جلال‌الدین آشتیانی; 1925–2005) was an Iranian professor of philosophy and Islamic mysticism. In addition to Iranian sheikhs, Ashtiani's many students included William Chittick from the US, Christian Bonaud from France, and Matsu Muto from Japan.
