= Ovamir Anjum =

Pakistani-American academic

Ovamir Anjum is a Pakistani-American academic. He is the Imam Khattab Chair of Islamic Studies at the Department of Philosophy, University of Toledo. He is the editor-in-chief at the Yaqeen Institute for Islamic Research and the founder of the Ummatics Institute. He studies the connections between theology, ethics, politics, and law in classical and medieval Islam, with an emphasis on its comparisons with western thought. His related fields of study include Islamic philosophy and Sufism.

== Early life and education ==
One of the formative influences on me growing up was to be shaken by the burning of Karachi in the ’80s, which began in the name of ethnic discrimination, and I saw the city go to flames. I have hated ethnic riots and demagoguery with a passion since.

Anjum was born in Karachi, Pakistan, into a family of Muhajir background and grew up in the Persian Gulf region before moving to the United States at age 18. He completed a masters in social sciences from the University of Chicago and a masters in computer science from the University of Wisconsin-Madison. He obtained his Ph.D. in Islamic intellectual history at the University of Wisconsin-Madison. His dissertation, published in 2012 by Cambridge University Press, is entitled Politics, Law, and Community in Islamic Thought: The Taymiyyan Moment.

== Islamic State of Iraq and the Levant ==
He believes that the Islamic State of Iraq and the Levant is heretical and run by poorly educated imams stating that "their claim of being a caliphate is a joke" and that "If you’re actually learned in the Islamic tradition you would know that these people are heretics. It’s like saying the KKK is Christian."

== Work ==
=== Books ===
- Politics, Law and Community in Islamic Thought: The Taymiyyan Movement (CUP, 2012)

=== Translations ===
- Ibn Qayyim al-Jawziyya, Ranks of the Divine Seekers: A Parallel English-Arabic Text (Madarij al-Salikeen) (Brill, 2020)

=== Papers ===
- "Is Contagion Real? Giving Context to Prophetic Wisdom" (Yaqeen, April 16, 2020)
- "Who Wants the Islamic Caliphate?" (Yaqeen, October 31, 2019)
