= Sachiko Murata =

Japanese scholar

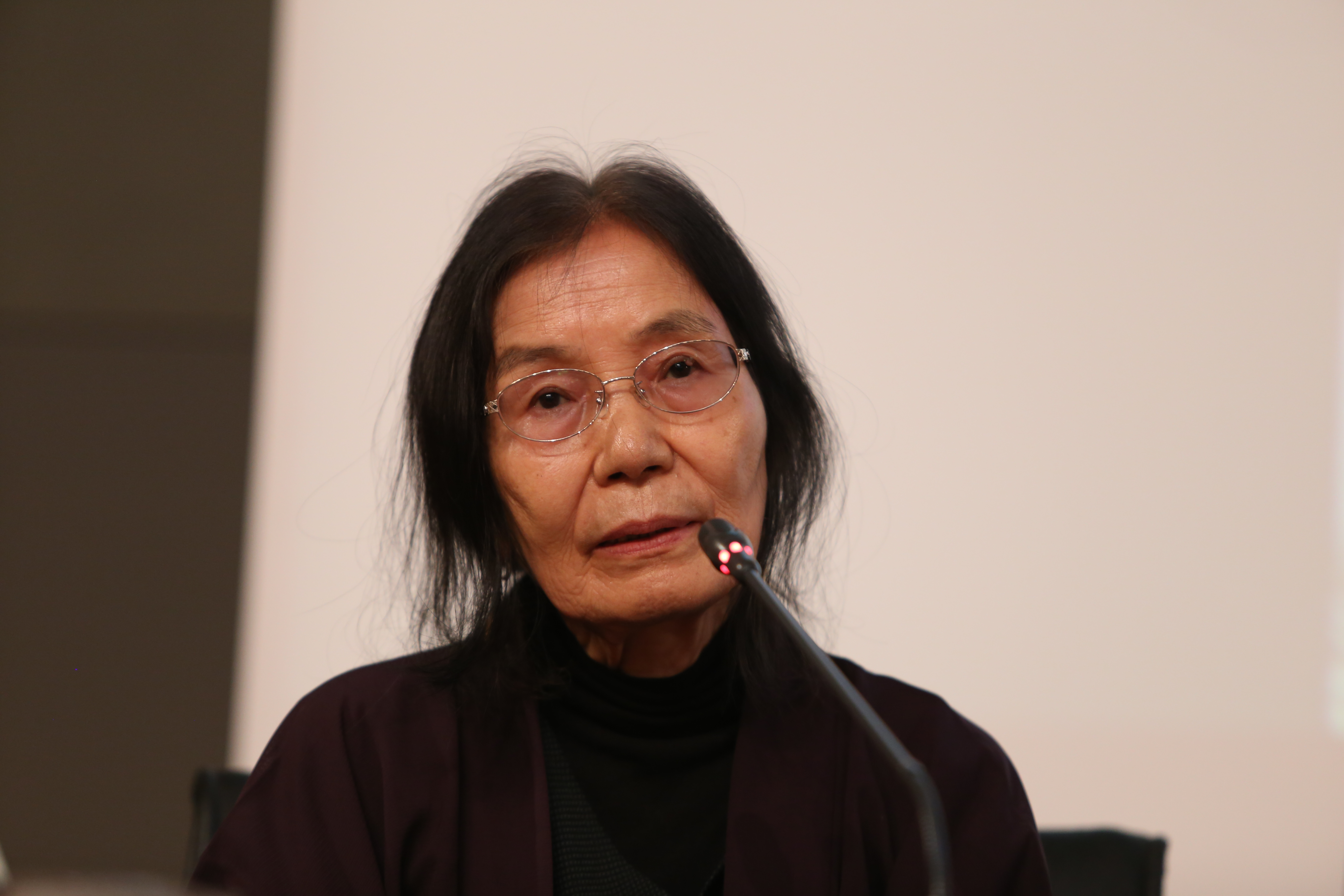
- Born: Sachiko Murata; 1943 (age 82–83)

Academic background
- Education: Chiba University, University of Tehran
- Influences: Seyyed Hossein Nasr

Academic work
- Institutions: Stony Brook University
- Notable works: The Tao of Islam: A Sourcebook on Gender Relationships in Islamic Thought (1992)

Sachiko Murata (村田幸子, born 1943) is a Japanese scholar of comparative philosophy and mysticism and a professor of religion and Asian studies at Stony Brook University.

== Life ==
Born in Asahikawa, Hokkaido, Japan in 1943, Murata received her B.A. in family law from Chiba University in Japan. She worked at a law firm in Tokyo for a year, and later attended Iran's University of Tehran, where she was the first woman and first non-Muslim to study fiqh (Islamic jurisprudence). She received her PhD in Persian literature in 1971, and then moved to the faculty of theology. She received her MA in Islamic jurisprudence in 1975, but shortly before completing her PhD in fiqh, the Iranian Revolution caused her and her husband William Chittick to leave the country. Murata resettled at SUNY Stony Brook in Stony Brook, New York, in 1983 where she teaches Islam, Confucianism, Taoism, and Buddhism.

Throughout her career, Murata has received various academic distinctions, which include being named the Kenan Rifai Distinguished Professor at the Institute of Advanced Humanistic Studies at Peking University, and an Honorary Professor at the School of Philosophy and Religious Studies at Minzu University. She has also been granted fellowships by esteemed organizations such as the National Endowment for the Humanities, the John Simon Guggenheim Foundation, the Harvard Centre for the Study of World Religions, and the Ecole des Hautes Etudes en Sciences Sociales (EHESS).

== Works ==
- Murata, Sachiko (23 March 1992). The Tao of Islam: A Sourcebook on Gender Relationships in Islamic Thought. State University of New York Press. ISBN 978-0-7914-0914-5.
- Murata, Sachiko (2000). Chinese Gleams of Sufi Light: Wang Tai-yu's Great Learning of the Pure and Real and Liu Chih's Displaying the Concealment of the Real Realm. With a New Translation of Jami's Lawa'ih from the Persian by William C. Chittick. SUNY Press. ISBN 978-0-7914-4637-9.
- Murata, Sachiko; Chittick, William (1994). The vision of Islam. Paragon House. ISBN 978-1-55778-516-9.
- Murata, Sachiko (2009). The Sage Learning of Liu Zhi: Islamic Thought in Confucian Terms. Harvard University Asia Center. ISBN 9780674033252.
- Murata, Sachiko (2015). Temporary Marriage in Islamic Law. CreateSpace Independent Publishing Platform. ISBN 978-1-5191-4192-7.

=== Translated ===
- Murata, Sachiko (1985). イスラーム法理論序說. 岩波書店. ISBN 978-4-00-004656-5.
