= William Chittick =

American philosopher and translator (born 1943)

William Clark Chittick
- Born: 29 June 1943 (age 83); Milford, Connecticut, U.S.

Education
- Education: University of Tehran

Philosophical work
- Era: Contemporary philosophy
- Region: Islamic philosophy
- Main interests: Sufism, Islamic philosophy
- Website: www.williamcchittick.com

William Clark Chittick (born June 29, 1943) is an American philosopher, writer, translator, and interpreter of classical Islamic philosophical and mystical texts. He is best known for his work on Rumi and Ibn 'Arabi, and has written extensively on the school of Ibn 'Arabi, Islamic philosophy, and Islamic cosmology. He is a Distinguished Professor in the Department of Asian and Asian American Studies at Stony Brook University.

== Biography ==
Born in Milford, Connecticut on June 29, 1943, Chittick earned his B.A. in history in 1966 from the College of Wooster in Wooster, Ohio. As part of his undergraduate program, he undertook the study of Islamic history at the American University of Beirut during the 1964–1965 academic year. During this time, he became familiar with Sufism as he chose to focus on the subject for his junior year independent study. Following a period of scholarly inquiry into the precepts of Sufism, he attended a public lecture by Seyyed Hossein Nasr, who was then the Aga Khan Visiting Professor of Islamic studies at the American University of Beirut. This lecture deepened his interest in Sufism, and, upon his graduation from Wooster, led him to pursue graduate studies at the University of Tehran's Faculty of Letters, where he spent eight years (1966-1974) working towards his doctoral degree in Persian literature. He earned his PhD in 1974 under Nasr's supervision. His PhD dissertation, which was published in 1977 and later reprinted in 1992, focused on Jami's Naqd al-Nusus. This work is a critical commentary on Ibn 'Arabi's Naqsh al-Fusus, which is a shortened version of his Fusus al-Hikam. While pursuing his studies at the University of Tehran, Chittick also served as a research assistant at the Center for the Study of Islamic Science from 1971 to 1972.

Chittick later taught comparative religion at Aryamehr Technical University and joined the faculty of the Imperial Iranian Academy of Philosophy in 1978. While in Tehran, he met Sachiko Murata, who was also studying there, and they got married. During his stay in Tehran, Chittick studied under and collaborated with distinguished scholars of Islamic thought such as Peter Lamborn Wilson, Jalal al-Din Ashtiyani, Henry Corbin, Toshihiko Izutsu, Badi' al-Zaman Furuzanfar, Jalal al-Din Humai, Mehdi Mohaghegh, and Sayyid Muhammad Husayn Tabatabai. This extended contact with such scholars gave Chittick a unique appreciation and mastery of classical Arabic and Persian, as well as a broad understanding of medieval Islamic philosophical, theological, and mystical texts.

Prior to the revolution in 1979, Chittick returned to the United States with his wife, and served as an associate editor for Encyclopædia Iranica in the early 1980s. Chittick began working at Stony Brook University in 1983 as an assistant professor in the Department of Religious Studies. He is currently Distinguished Professor in the Department of Asian and Asian American Studies at Stony Brook University.

Chittick has been the recipient of several academic honors throughout his career. These include the Kenan Rifai Distinguished Professorship at the Institute of Advanced Humanistic Studies at Peking University, as well as an Honorary Professorship at the School of Philosophy and Religious Studies at Minzu University. In addition, he has been awarded fellowships from a number of esteemed organizations, such as the National Endowment for the Humanities, the John Simon Guggenheim Foundation, the Harvard Centre for the Study of World Religions, and the Ecole des Hautes Etudes en Sciences Sociales (EHESS).

== Influence ==
William Chittick is widely regarded as one of the foremost scholars in the field of Islamic philosophy and mysticism. He is "renowned for his translations and interpretations of classical Islamic philosophy and mystical texts". Chittick has been variously called "one of the most important contemporary translators and interpretors of Islamic mystical texts and poetry", "arguably the leading scholar of Ibn al-Arabi writing in English", and "one of the major scholars of Islamic thought" in the contemporary world.

According to Mohammed Rustom, Atif Khalil, and Kazuyo Murata, "Students of Islamic thought are, in one way or another, indebted to Chittick's writings". Taneli Kukkonen of New York University notes that "Over the course of four decades, William Chittick has done more than anyone to elucidate for an Anglophone audience's benefit the theosophical side of Sufi literature and later Islamic philosophy".

== Major works ==
Chittick has published 30 books and numerous articles on Islamic intellectual history, Sufism and Islamic philosophy.

=== Books ===
- The Sufi Doctrine of Rumi: An Introduction (Tehran: Aryamehr University Press, 1974). A new edition, The Sufi Doctrine of Rumi, released in 2005 (see below).
- The Sufi Path of Love: The Spiritual Teachings of Rumi (Albany: State University of New York Press, 1983). It has been translated into Russian (1995), Indonesian (2000), Persian (2004, 2005) and Bosnian (2005).
- The Sufi Path of Knowledge: Ibn al-'Arabi's Metaphysics of Imagination (Albany: State University of New York Press, 1989). It has been partially translated into Indonesian (2001) and fully into Persian (2010).
- Imaginal Worlds: Ibn al-'Arabi and the Problem of Religious Diversity (Albany: State University of New York Press, 1994). It has been translated into Turkish (1999), Indonesian (2001), Spanish (2004) and Persian (2004, 2005, 2007).
- With Sachiko Murata, The Vision of Islam (New York: Paragon, 1994). It has been translated into Persian (1999), Turkish (2000), Indonesian (2005), Albanian (2008), Urdu (2008) and Russian (2014).
- Varolmanın Boyutları (The Dimensions of Existence) A collection of seventeen essays edited and translated by Turan Koç (Istanbul: Insan Yayınları, 1997).
- The Self-Disclosure of God: Principles of Ibn al-'Arabi's Cosmology (Albany: State University of New York Press, 1998).
- Sufism: A Short Introduction (Oxford: Oneworld, 2000). It has been translated into Indonesian (2002), Turkish (2003), Persian (2004, 2007), Albanian (2007), Italian (2009) and Russian (2012).
- The Heart of Islamic Philosophy:The Quest for Self-Knowledge in the Teachings of Afdal al-Din Kashani (Oxford: Oxford University Press, 2001). It has been translated into Persian (2011).
- Ibn 'Arabi: Heir to the Prophets (Oxford: Oneworld, 2005). It has been translated into German (2012), Albanian (2012), Turkish (2014), Persian (2014), Arabic (2015) and Urdu (2022).
- The Sufi Doctrine of Rumi: Illustrated Edition (Bloomington, IN: World Wisdom, 2005). It has been translated into Spanish (2008) and Albanian (2009).
- Science of the Cosmos, Science of the Soul: The Pertinence of Islamic Cosmology in the Modern World (Oxford: Oneworld, 2007). It has been translated into Persian (2009), Indonesian (2010), Turkish (2010) and Albanian (2011).
- With Sachiko Murata and Tu Weiming, The Sage Learning of Liu Zhi: Islamic Thought in Confucian Terms (Cambridge, MA: Harvard University Asia Centre, 2009).
- In Search of the Lost Heart: Explorations in Islamic Thought. An anthology of Chittick's writings (from 1975 to 2012) edited by Mohammed Rustom, Atif Khalil, and Kazuyo Murata (Albany: State University of New York Press, 2012). It has been translated into Persian. (2017)
- Divine Love: Islamic Literature and the Path to God (New Haven: Yale University Press, 2013). It has been translated into Persian (2016).
- Rumi et Shams: la voie spirituelle de l'Amour. A collection of Chittick's writings translated into French by Jean Annestay (Paris: Editions i Littérature, 2021).
- Muqarabat fi l-tasawwuf wa-l-hubb wa-l-insan. Several articles translated by Muhammad 'Ali Jaradi and Dima El-Mouallem (a special issue of al-Mahajja 36 [2021], edited by Ahmad Majed).
- L'Âme et le Cosmos: Miroir et unite. A selection of articles translated by Ghislain Chetan (Paris: Les Lumières d'Orient, 2023).
- Dirasat fi fikr al-Shaykh al-Akbar Muhyi al-Din Ibn al-'Arabi wa-madrasatihi. A large collection of articles on Ibn 'Arabi and his school translated by Naser Dumairieh and edited by Abdel Baki Meftah (Kuwait: Dar al-Ma'ani, 2023).

=== Edited volumes ===
- With Seyyed Hossein Nasr (vols. 1–3) and Peter Zirnis (vols. 2–3), An Annotated Bibliography of Islamic Science (Tehran: Imperial Iranian Academy of Philosophy, 1975–78, vols. 1–2; Tehran: Cultural Studies and Research Institute, 1991, vol. 3).
- 'Abd al-Rahmân Jâmî, Naqd al-nusûs fi sharh naqsh al-fusûs, Persian and Arabic text with critical apparatus, notes, English and Persian introductions, indexes (Tehran: Imperial Iranian Academy of Philosophy, 1977).
- The Works of Seyyed Hossein Nasr Through His Fortieth Birthday. Edited and Introduced (Uppsala: University of Utah Press, 1977).
- The Inner Journey: Views from the Islamic Tradition. Edited and Introduced (Sandpoint, ID: White Thread Press, 2007).
- The Essential Seyyed Hossein Nasr. Edited and Introduced (Bloomington, IN: World Wisdom, 2007).

=== Translations ===
- Muhammad Husayn Tabataba'i, A Shi'ite Anthology (Albany: State University of New York Press, 1981).
- Javad Nurbakhsh, Sufism [I] : Meaning, Knowledge, and Unity (New York: Khaniqahi-Nimatullahi, 1981).
- Fakhr al-Din 'Iraqi, Divine Flashes. Translated with P.L. Wilson (New York: Paulist Press, 1982).
- Javad Nurbakhsh, Sufism [II]: Fear and Hope, Contraction and Expansion, Gathering and Dispersion, Intoxication and Sobriety, Annihilation and Subsistence (New York: Khaniqahi-Nimatullahi, 1982).
- Ali ibn Abi Talib, Supplications (Du'â), (London: Muhammadi Trust, 1982).
- Zayn al-'Abidin, The Psalms of Islam. Translated and introduced (London: Muhammadi Trust, 1988). Reprinted as The Psalms of Islam: English Version (Birmingham: al-Mahdi Institute, and Marsta, Sweden: Me'raj Educational Publishers, 2007).
- Javad Nurbakhsh, Sufism IV: Repentance, Abstinence, Renunciation, Wariness, Humility, Humbleness, Sincerity, Steadfastness, Courtesy (London: Khaniqahi-Nimatullahi, 1988).
- Faith and Practice of Islam: Three Thirteenth Century Sufi Texts (Albany: State University of New York Press, 1992).
- 'Abd al-Rahman Jami, Gleams. Translated in Sachiko Murata, Chinese Gleams of Sufi Light: Wang Tai-yu's Great Learning of the Pure and Real and Liu Chih's Displaying the Concealment of the Real Realm (Albany: State University of New York Press, 2000).
- Mulla Sadra, The Elixir of the Gnostics. Translated, Edited, and Introduced (Provo: Brigham Young University Press, 2003).
- Shams al-Din Tabrizi, Me and Rumi: The Autobiography of Shams-i Tabrizi. Annotated and Translated (Louisville, KY: Fons Vitae, 2004).
- Ibn 'Arabi, select translations from The Meccan Revelations. Translated by Michel Chodkiewicz (ed.), The Meccan Revelations (New York: Pir Press, 2004).
- Sadr al-Din al-Qunawi, The Texts. Translated in Seyyed Hossein Nasr and Mehdi Aminrazavi (eds.), An Anthology of Philosophy in Persia, vol. 4 (London: I.B. Tauris in association with The Institute of Ismaili Studies, 2012). Note: The translation of this text in this volume is slightly abridged. For the complete translation, see https://www.academia.edu/8101330/Sadr_al-Din_Qunawi_The_Texts_al-Nusus_
- Aqa Muhammad Rida Qumsha'i, On the Oneness of Existence, or Rather, the Existent and Addendum to the Ringstone on Seth from 'The Ringstones of Wisdom': On the Topics of Friendship. Translated in Seyyed Hossein Nasr and Mehdi Aminrazavi (eds.), An Anthology of Philosophy in Persia, vol. 5 (London: I.B. Tauris in association with The Institute of Ismaili Studies, 2015).
- Rashid al-Din Maybudi, select translations from The Unveiling of the Mysteries and the Provision of the Pious (Louisville: Fons Vitae, 2015). Also available online at Altafsir.com.
- Aḥmad Samʿānī, The Repose of the Spirits: A Sufi Commentary on the Divine Names. Translated and Introduced (Albany: State University of New York Press, 2019).

== See also ==
- Insha-Allah Rahmati
- Iranian studies
- Muhammad Husayn Tabataba'i
- Rumi
- Sachiko Murata
- Seyyed Hossein Nasr
- Sufi studies
- Sufism
