= 'Aql =

Arabic term for intellect

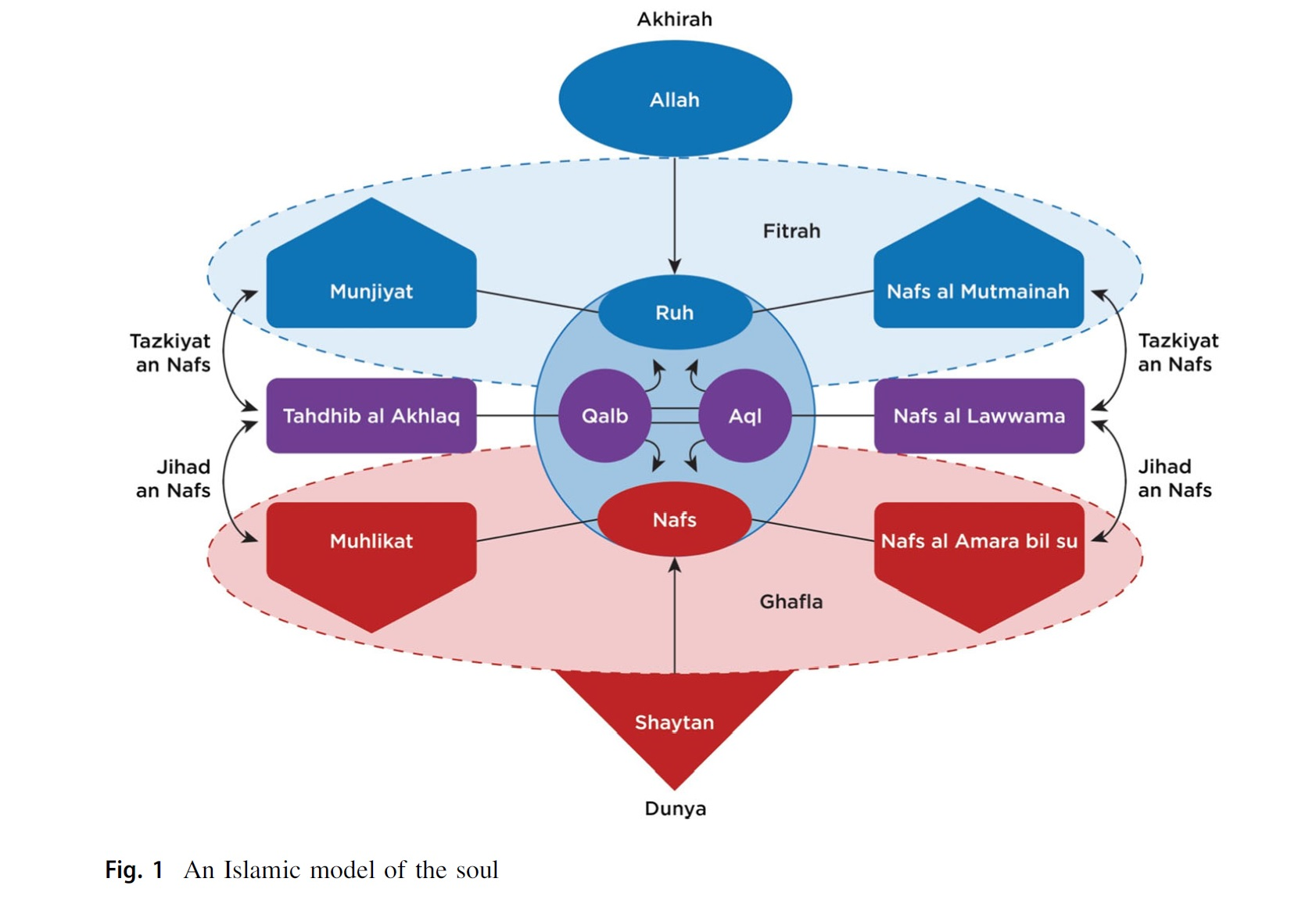
A visual rendition of the Islamic model of the soul showing the position of 'aql relative to other concepts based on a consensus of 18 surveyed academic and religious experts.

'Aql (Arabic: عَقْل, romanized: ʿaql, lit. 'intellect') is an Arabic term used in Islamic philosophy and theology for the intellect or the rational faculty of the soul that connects humans to God. According to Islamic beliefs, 'aql is what guides humans towards the right path (sirat al-mustaqim) and prevents them from deviating. In jurisprudence, it is associated with using reason as a source for sharia and has been translated as 'dialectical reasoning'.

== Etymology ==
The term "al-'aql" in Arabic is derived from the root word "ql," which means to bind. In Islamic thought, it is used to describe the faculty that connects individuals to God. It is usually translated in English as intellect, intelligence, reason or rational faculty.

== In the Quran ==
The Quran doesn't use the word "aql" explicitly, but its verbal forms such as yaʿqelūn appear 49 times. Intellect is important because it allows humans to understand God's signs in nature (2:164, 13:4, 16:12, 23:80) and in the Quran or other scriptures (2:44, 3:65, 3:118, 10:16, 11:51). Intellect prevents humans from committing actions that would lead them to punishment in hell (67:10). Moreover, it allows individuals to comprehend that the afterlife is better than this world (6:32, 7:161, 12:109, 28:60). Those who lack intellect are seen as the worst creatures in God's sight ("Surely the worst of beasts in God's eyes are those who are deaf and dumb and do not use their intellect") (8:22). Elsewhere, the Quran says: "Have they not traveled in the earth that they might have hearts with which to intellect and ears with which to hear? Surely the eyes are not blind, but blind are the hearts within the breasts". (22:46).

In the perspective of Islam it is precisely ‘aql which keeps man on the straight path (the sirat al-mustaqim) and prevents him from going astray. That is why so many verses of the Quran equate those who go astray with those who cannot use their intellect (as in the verses wa la ya‘qilun, ‘they do not understand’ or literally ‘use their intellect’—the verb ya‘qilun deriving from the root ‘aqala which is related to ‘aql; or the verse la yafqahun, ‘they understand not’, the verb yafqahun being related to the root faqiha which again means comprehension or knowledge.)

— Seyyed Hossein Nasr, Sufi Essays, 1972

Moreover, the term ūlu’l-albāb (possessors of intellect) is mentioned 16 times in the Quran, and commentators often associate their "lobb" with intellect. The Quran (39:9) poses a rhetorical question, asking whether those who possess knowledge and those who do not are equal. The answer, according to the Quran, is that only the ūlu’l-albāb (the possessors of intellects) are the ones who remember and understand the significance of God's signs.

== In Sunni and Shia sources ==
While Sunni Hadiths acknowledge the value of intellect, Shia Hadith collections contain a larger number of traditions that praise it. The connection between intellect and sound religious faith and practice is emphasized in both Sunni and Shia traditions. According to Ḡazzālī, the Prophet said that intellect is the foundation of the believer, and it determines the extent of their worship. The Shiʿite sources, in particular, stress the idea that intellect is the foundation of all positive moral qualities. In that vein, Imam Jaʿfar al-Ṣādeq defines intellect as the means by which one worships the All-Merciful and attains Paradise.

The term ‘aql was heavily elucidated by early Shī‘ah thinkers; it came to replace and expand the pre-Islamic concept of ḥilm (Arabic: حلم) "serene justice and self-control, dignity" in opposition to the negative notions of ignorance (jahl) and stupidity (safah).

The "possessor of ‘aql", or al-‘āqīl (plural al-‘uqqāl) realises a deep connection with God. Jaʿfar aṣ-Ṣādiq (d. 765, notably an Imām) described this connection as a realisation that God loves some, that God is truth and that only ‘ilm "sacred knowledge" and its development can help humanity fulfil its potential.

His son, Imām Mūsà al-Kāżim (d. 799), expanded this exegesis by defining ‘aql as the "faculty for apprehending the divine, a faculty of metaphysical perception, a light in the heart, through which one can discern and recognize signs from God." He further noted that where the A'immah (Imāms) are the ḥujjatu ż-żāhira "External proof [of God]", ‘aql is the ḥujjatu l-Bāṭina "Secret proof".

While in early Islam, ‘aql was opposed to jahl "ignorance", the expansion of the concept meant it was now opposed to safah "[deliberate] stupidity" and junūn "lack of sense, indulgence". Under the influence of Mu‘tazilī thought, ‘aql came to mean "dialectical reasoning".

== In Islamic jurisprudence ==
In Shī‘ī jurisprudence, ‘aql is the process of using intellect or logic to deduce law. Legal scholars in both Sunni and Shī‘ī Islamic traditions share Quranic interpretation, the Sunnah, and Ijma‘ "consensus" as sources of Islamic law and judicial decisions (ḥukm). However, Twelvers of the Ja‘farī school of law utilize ‘aql whereas Sunnis use qiyas "analogical reasoning" as the fourth source of law.

Among Twelvers, Akhbārīs (associated with exotericism and traditionalism and theological schools in Qom) and Usulis (associated with esotericism and rationalism and theological schools in Baghdad) were contending subschools: the former reject ijtihād outright; the latter advocate ijtihad and have been predominant for the last 300 years.

In Shī‘ī Islam, "the gates of ijtihād" were never closed and with the use of ‘aql, Shī‘ī mujtahids "practitioner of ijtihād" and faqīhs "legal specialists" are able to respond as issues arise that were not explicitly dealt with in the Qur'an or Sunnah.

== In Traditionalist Jurisprudence and Hadith Criticism ==
In traditionalist Ahl al-Hadith methodology and classical usul al-fiqh, the role of 'aql (reason) is explicitly subordinate to naql (transmitted textual authority, specifically the Quran and authentic hadith). Traditionalist scholars argued that human intellect is limited and prone to subjective error, whereas revelation represents infallible divine guidance. Consequently, classical hadith evaluation focused primarily on isnād (the biographical continuity and credibility of the chain of narrators) rather than matn (textual content analysis using personal reason).

Prominent traditionalists maintained that when a prophetic tradition is authenticated through an unbroken, reliable chain of transmission, rational skepticism must yield to submission. Early jurists and theologians frequently cautioned against prioritizing rational opinion ('aql or ra'y) over text. As the classical hadith scholar Ibn Khuzaymah (d. 924) famously stated:

There is no conflict between a genuine sunnah of the Messenger of God and the intellect. If anyone perceives a contradiction between them, it is because their intellect is flawed, not because the sunnah is invalid.

— Ibn Khuzaymah, Kitāb al-Tawḥīd

In Sunni jurisprudence, while rational tools such as qiyas (analogical reasoning) were adopted by legal schools like the Ḥanafīs and Shāfiʿīs, these tools were strictly governed by textual precedents. Scholars like Ibn Hazm (d. 1064) and the Zahiri school went further, rejecting both qiyas and subjective reasoning outright, asserting that laws must be derived exclusively from the explicit meaning ('zāhir) of the text and verified narrations.

== See also ==
- Fitra
- Rūḥ
- Qalb
- Nafs
- Mana (Mandaeism)

== Sources ==
- Chittick, William (1986). "ʿAql". Encyclopaedia Iranica. 2: 195–98.
- Hardaker, G.; Sabki, A.A. (2018). Pedagogy in Islamic Education: The Madrasah Context. Emerald Publishing Limited. ISBN 978-1-78754-532-8.
- Nasr, S.H. (1972). Sufi Essays. State University of New York Press. ISBN 978-0-7914-1052-3.
- Murata, S.; Chittick, W.C.; Weiming, T. (2020). The Sage Learning of Liu Zhi: Islamic Thought in Confucian Terms. Harvard University Studies in East Asian Law. Brill. ISBN 978-1-68417-049-4.
- Rothman, Abdallah; Coyle, Adrian (2018). "Toward a Framework for Islamic Psychology and Psychotherapy: An Islamic Model of the Soul". Journal of Religion and Health. 57 (5). Springer Science and Business Media LLC: 1731–44. doi:10.1007/s10943-018-0651-x. ISSN 0022-4197. PMC 6132620. PMID 29907906.
