= Toshihiko Izutsu =

Japanese scholar (1914–1993)

- 井筒 俊彦
- Izutsu in Ascona in 1979
- Born: 4 May 1914; Tokyo, Japan
- Died: 7 January 1993 (aged 78); Kamakura, Japan
- Known for: His translation of the Qurʾān into Japanese

Academic background
- Education: Keio University
- Influences: Junzaburo Nishiwaki

Academic work
- Institutions: Keio University; McGill University; Imperial Iranian Academy of Philosophy

Toshihiko Izutsu (井筒 俊彦, Izutsu Toshihiko; 4 May 1914 – 7 January 1993) was a Japanese scholar who specialized in Islamic studies and comparative religion. He took an interest in linguistics at a young age, and came to know more than thirty languages, including Arabic, Hebrew, Turkish, Persian, Sanskrit, Pali, Hindustani, Russian, Greek, and Chinese. He is widely known for his translation of the Qurʾān into Japanese.

== Life and academic career ==
He was born on 4 May 1914 into a wealthy family in Tokyo, Japan. From an early age, he was familiar with zen meditation and kōan, since his father was also a calligrapher and a practising lay Zen Buddhist. He entered the Faculty of Economics at Keio University but transferred to the Department of English literature, wishing to be instructed by Professor Junzaburō Nishiwaki. Following his bachelor's degree, he became a research assistant in 1937.

In 1958, he completed the first direct translation of the Quran from Arabic into Japanese (the first indirect translation had been accomplished a decade prior by Okawa Shumei). His translation is still renowned for its linguistic accuracy and is widely used for scholarly works. He was extremely talented in learning foreign languages and finished reading the Quran a month after beginning to learn Arabic. Between 1969 and 1975, he became a professor of Islamic philosophy at McGill University in Montreal, Quebec (Canada). He was the professor of philosophy at the Iranian Research Institute of Philosophy, then known as the Imperial Iranian Academy of Philosophy, in Tehran, Iran. While in Iran, he worked and collaborated with Seyyed Hossein Nasr, William Chittick, Peter Lamborn Wilson and others. He came back to Japan from Iran after the Islamic Revolution in 1979, and he wrote, seemingly more assiduously, many books and articles in Japanese on Eastern philosophy and its significance.

In understanding Izutsu's academic legacy, there are four points to bear in mind: his relation to Buddhism, particularly Zen Buddhism, his interest in language, his inclination towards postmodernism, and his interest in comparative philosophy.

In Sufism and Taoism: A Comparative Study of Key Philosophical Concepts (1983), he compared the metaphysical and mystical thought-systems of Sufism and Taoism, and asserted that, although historically unrelated, these two traditions share similar features and patterns.

He died in Kamakura on 7 January 1993.

== Notable works ==
- Language and Magic: Studies in the Magical Function of Speech (1956)
- The Structure of the Ethical Terms in the Koran: A Study in Semantics (1959)
- God and Man in the Koran: Semantics of the Koranic Weltanschauung (1964)
- The Concept of Belief in Islamic Theology: A Semantic Analysis of Īmān and Islām (1965)
- Ethico-religious Concepts in the Qurʾān (1966; reprinted in 2002 with a new foreword by Charles J. Adams)
- A Comparative Study of the Key Philosophical Concepts in Sufism and Taoism (2 vols., 1966–1967)
- The Concept and Reality of Existence (1971)
- Toward a Philosophy of Zen Buddhism (1977)
- The Theory of Beauty in the Classical Aesthetics of Japan (with Toyoko Izutsu, 1981)
- Sufism and Taoism: A Comparative Study of Key Philosophical Concepts (1983)
- Creation and the Timeless Order of Things: Essays in Islamic Mystical Philosophy (1994)
- The Structure of Oriental Philosophy: Collected Papers of the Eranos Conference: Volume I (2008)
- The Structure of Oriental Philosophy: Collected Papers of the Eranos Conference: Volume II (2008)

== Documentaries ==
- The Eastern, directed by Masoud Taheri, 2018
