= Wahdat al-wujūd =

The Unity of Being

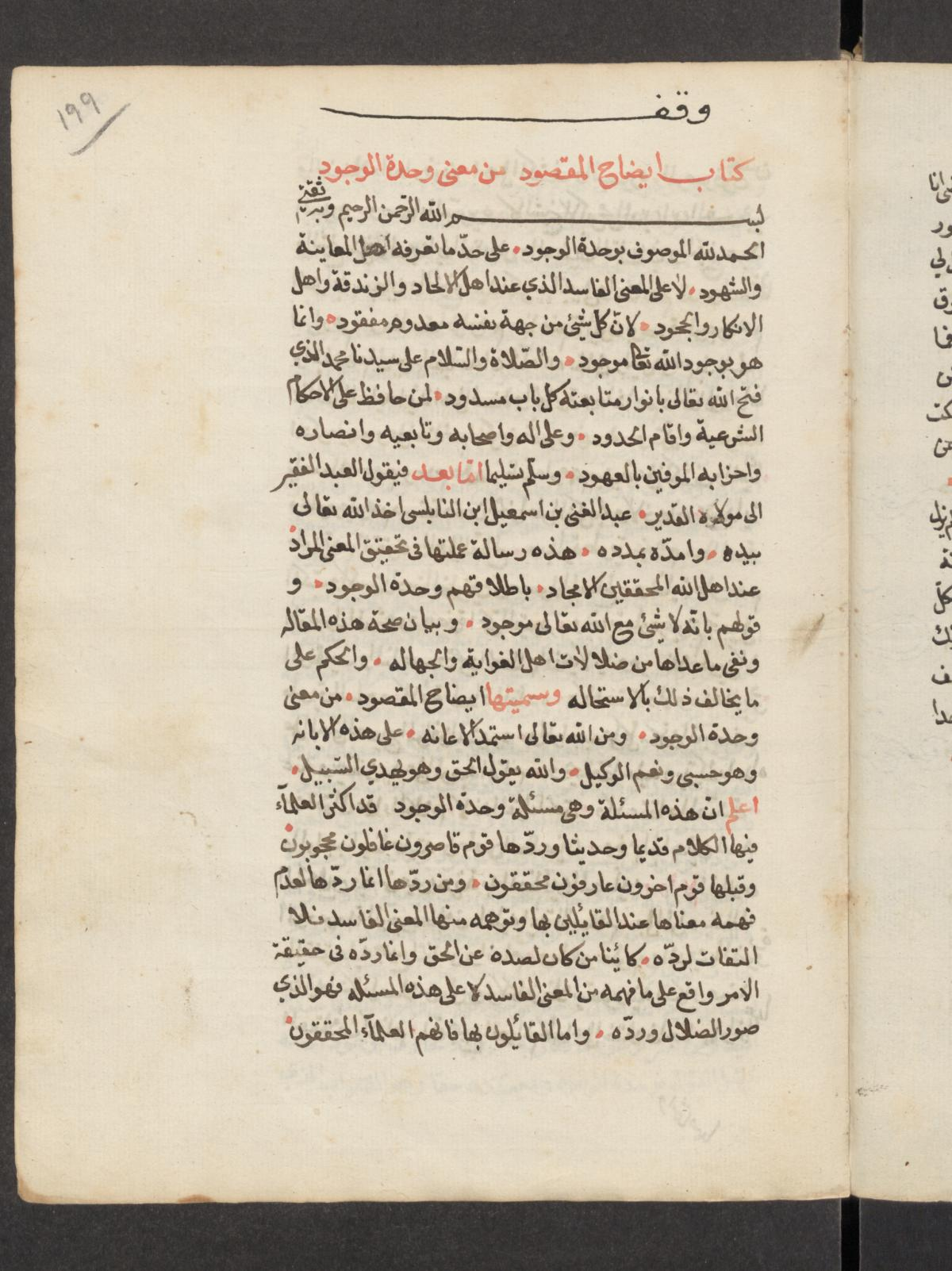
First page of a manuscript of Īḍāḥ al-maqṣūd min maʿnā waḥdat al-wujūd, an Arabic treatise by Abd al-Ghani al-Nabulusi (d. 1731) on wahdat al-wujūd. The manuscript dates from the 18th century and is located in the Staatsbibliothek zu Berlin.

Wahdat al-wujūd (Arabic: وحدة الوجود "unity of existence, oneness of being") is a doctrine in the field of Islamic philosophy and mysticism, according to which the monotheistic God is identical with existence (wujūd) and this one existence is that through which all existing things (mawjūdāt) exist. This doctrine, which in recent research is characterized as ontological monism, is attributed to the Andalusian Sufi Ibn Arabi (d. 1240) but was essentially developed by the philosophically oriented interpreters of his works. In the Early Modern Period, it gained great popularity among Sufis. Some Muslim scholars such as Ibn Taymiyya (d. 1329), ʿAbd al-Qādir Badā'ūnī (d. 1597/98) and Ahmad Sirhindi (d. 1624), however, regarded wahdat al-wujūd as a pantheistic heresy in contradiction to Islam and criticized it for leading its followers to antinomianist views. In reality, however, many advocates of wahdat al-wujūd emphasized that this teaching did not provide any justification for transgressing Sharia. The Egyptian scholar Murtada al-Zabidi (d. 1790) described wahdat al-wujūd as a "famous problem" (masʾala mashhūra) that arose between the "people of mystical truth" (ahl al-ḥaqīqa) and the "scholars of the literal sense" (ʿulamāʾ aẓ-ẓāhir). The Ni'matullahi master Javad Nurbakhsh (d. 2008) was of the opinion that Sufism as a whole was essentially a school of the "unity of being".

Another name for this doctrine is Tawhid wujūdī ("existential monism, doctrine of existential unity"). The adherents of Wahdat al-Wujūd were also known as Wujūdis (Wujūdīya) or "people of unity" (ahl al-waḥda).

== Formation ==
Many Muslim scholars regarded Ibn ʿArabī as the founder of the wahdat al-wujūd concept. Thus, al-Dhahabi (d. 1348) and Jāmi (d. 1492) described Ibn ʿArabī as a “model of those who know about wahdat al-wujūd” (qudwat al-ʿālimīn bi-waḥdat al-wujūd) or as the “model of the advocates of wahdat al-wujūd” (qudwat al-qāʾilīn bi-waḥdat al-wujūd). And the Indian Naqshbandiyya-Sufi Ahmad Sirhindi (1564-1624) explained in one of his Maktūbāt: “The first to clearly state the doctrine of existential unity (al-tawḥīd al-wujūdī) was Shaykh Muhyī l-Dīn Ibn ʿArabī. “ Also Shah Waliullah Dehlawi (d. 1762) regarded Ibn ʿArabī as the “leader of those who believe in the wahdat al-wujūd”. In contrast, the Egyptian Azhar scholar Muhammad Ghallāb (d. 2023) acquitted Ibn ʿArabī in a 1969 memorial volume dedicated to him of the "heretical" doctrine of Wahdat al-wujūd and claimed that he had nothing to do with it. According to him, it was merely an invention of the Orientalists that Ibn ʿArabī had raised this idea.

=== Explicit statements of Ibn ʿArabī on the unity of existence ===
In fact, in the extensive corpus of Ibn ʿArabī's writings, there is not a single place where he uses the expression Wahdat al-wujūd in this form, However, the Syrian scholar Bakri Aladdin has pointed out several passages where Ibn ʿArabī speaks of a unity of existence. These are the following passages:

- In the 113th chapter of his work al-Futūḥāt al-Makkīya he writes: “Affirm diversity in immutability (thubūt), but keep it away from existence (wujūd). Affirm unity in existence (al-waḥda fī al-wujūd), but keep it away from immutability."
- He expresses a similar view in his Kitāb al-Alif: “Number and multiplicity appear only through His action on intelligible, non-existent levels. Thus, all that is in existence is one (fa-kull mā fī l-wujūd wāḥid), for if it were not one, one could not validly affirm unity with God - praise be to Him."
- Ibn ʿArabī expresses this idea even more succinctly in his Kitāb al-Jalāla: “Thus the whole of existence is in reality one, and there is nothing beside it” (wa-hākadhā kull al-wujūd huwa wāḥid fī l-ḥaqīqa, lā shayʾ maʿa-hū).
- And in one of his Sufi prayers Ibn ʿArabī asks God: “I ask You, by the secret with which You bring together the complementary opposites, that You bring together for me everything that is disunited in my being in such a way that it lets me experience the unity of Your existence (an yushhidanī waḥdat wujūdika).“ Beneito and Hirtenstein point out that in some manuscripts the relevant passage does not read waḥdat wujūdika, but waḥdat wujūdī (“the unity of my existence”).

Mohsen Jahangiri, former professor of philosophy at the University of Tehran, has also pointed out some passages in Ibn ʿArabī's oeuvre where, like the later representatives of the wahdat-al-wujūd doctrine, he limits the principle of existence to God or equates God with existence. These are the following passages:

- In the eighth chapter of his Fuṣūṣ al-ḥikam Ibn ʿArabī explains: “The contingent things actually belong to non-existence (ʿadam), for there is no existence except the existence of the True one (wujūd al-ḥaqq) with the forms of the states that the contingent things have in themselves and in the entities.”
- In the 54th chapter of al-Futūḥāt al-Makkīya he writes: “It is established among the seekers of truth (muḥaqqiqūn) that nothing exists except God and, even if we exist, our existence is only through Him. The one whose existence is due to something else, is in reality non-existent.”
- In the 69th chapter of the same work, which deals with the secrets of prayer, Ibn ʿArabī explains that the true believer speaks only with his Lord and does not take any of the servants of God into his confidence without seeing in it a dialogue (munājāt) with his Lord. He explains: "For God is existence and that which exists, and it is He who is worshipped in every worshiper and in everything, and He is the existence of everything."
- In the 455th chapter of al-Futūḥāt al-Makkīya he explains that the Quranic statement in Sura 57:3 "He is the First and the Last, the Visible and the Hidden" indicates that God is the whole of existence (al-wuǧūd kulluhū).

=== The idea of the unity of existence before Ibn ʿArabī ===
However, statements of similar content can also be found in Muslim authors before Ibn ʿArabī. As an example we may refer to al-Ghazālī (d. 1111) who in the chapter on the love of God in his work Iḥyāʾ ʿulūm ad-dīn writes that nothing having persistence in itself is in existence except the living Persistent (= God), who persists in Himself (laisa fī l-wujūd shayʾ la-hū bi-nafsihī qiwām illā l-qayyūm al-ḥayy alladhī huwa qāʾim bi-dhātihī), everything else exists only through Him. The existence of the universe belongs to the existence of God just as the existence of light belongs to the sun or the existence of the shadow belongs to the shadow-casting tree. Murtadā az-Zabīdī (d. 1790), who wrote a commentary on the Iḥyāʾ ʿulūm ad-dīn, said that if one looks at this statement, one can recognize a tendency towards the Wahdat al-wujūd, which “the people of truth” (ahl al-ḥaqīqa) taught. Al-Ghazālī, he says, referred to them in numerous other places in his book, such as in the chapter on patience and gratitude, where he said: “Contemplation with the eye of the pure Tawhid makes you realize that apart from God, the Exalted, nothing is in existence (al-naẓar bi-ʿain al-tauḥīd al-maḥḍ yuʿarrifuka annahū laisa fī l-wujūd ghayrahū taʿālā)', and also in his book Mishkāt al-anwār.

The Arabic expression waḥdat al-wujūd can also be found literally in Shihāb al-Dīn Yahyā al-Suhrawardī (d. 1191). There, it is associated with the ontological position of the primacy of Whatness (māhīya). According to it, existence is not something that is added to the essence of a thing, but is identical with its essence. If existence were something that was added to whatness, then this addition (iḍāfa) would only exist through its existence, which would mean an infinite regress, which would be absurd. Thus, the unity of existence is also identical with existence, so that the latter is not completely lost (fa-waḥdat al-wujūd huwa ḥattā lā yadhhab aṣlan). However, it is not enough to say that the unity of existence is identical with existence or the existence of unity with unity, because the concept of existence is different from the concept of unity and two things cannot be one thing in themselves.

=== “Wahdat al-wujūd” as the name for Ibn ʿArabī's system of teaching ===
The fact that Ibn ʿArabī was nevertheless regarded as the founder of the doctrine of wahdat al-wujūd had to do with the fact that, beyond explicit references to the term, his fundamental writings were regarded as elaborations of this doctrine. Thus, the followers of Ibn ʿArabī recognized references to the unity of existence in several of his statements. For example, Ibn ʿArabī says in the first chapter of his Fuṣūṣ al-ḥikam that the connection of existing things – meaning God and the rest of things – can be easily recognized because they have something in common, namely individual existence (al-wuǧūd al-ʿainī). ʿAfīf al-Dīn at-Tilimsānī (d. 1290), who wrote the first commentary on the Fuṣūṣ al-ḥikam, explains in it that Ibn ʿArabī wanted to point to the doctrine of existential unity (at-tawḥīd al-wujūdī) with this statement. He did not consider it good to mention it explicitly here, but did so elsewhere. Al-Tilimsānī comments on Ibn ʿArabī's further remarks at this point with the statement that he wanted to prepare the ground for identifying the attributes of the proxy (al-ḫalīfa; i. e. of man) with those of the one who appoints him as proxy (al-mustaḫlif; i.e. God), in order to finally trace everything back to one entity (ʿain), namely the existence of God. Overall, he says, Ibn ʿArabī's statements are based on the teaching that existence is one, but the entities (al-aʿyān) are different. These different entities are called Aʿyān thābita (immutable entities). A particularly widely debated statement, which has been considered to express Ibn ʿArabī's understanding of wahdat-al-wujūd, was his exclamation "Praise be to the One who has brought things into being and is Himself identical with them" in the 198th chapter of al-Futūḥāt al-Makkīya.

The Yemeni scholar Sālih ibn Mahdī al-Maqbalī (d. 1696) reports a conversation he had with the Kurdish scholar Muhammad ibn ʿAbd al-Rasūl al-Barzanjī (d. 1691). They both agreed that Ibn ʿArabī's statements in his Fuṣūṣ al-ḥikam all revolved around the unity of existence and that his work al-Futūḥāt al-Makkiyya clarified this. Sirhindī opined that Ibn ʿArabī was the one who “worked out the problem of the unity of existence in chapters and sections and established its syntax and grammar”.

== Other early proponents of the doctrine and their statements ==
Beside Ibn ʿArabī, Ibn Taymiyya mentions the scholars Sadr al-Din al-Qunawi (d. 1274), Ibn Sabʿīn (d. 1270), Ibn al-Farid (d. 1235), ʿĀmir al-Basrī (bl. around 1300), ʿAfīf al-Dīn at-Tilimsānī (d. 1290), Saʿīd al-Dīn al-Farghānī (d. ca. 1300), Abu al-Hasan al-Shushtari (d. 1269), ʿAbdallāh al-Balyānī (d. 1288) and an otherwise unknown Ibn Abī Mansūr al-Misrī as proponents of the Wahdat al-Wujūd doctrine. To these people, whom he refers to collectively as ahl al-waḥda ("people of unity"), he attributes the teaching that existence is one and that the necessary existence of the Creator is identical with the contingent existence of the created. The fact that he also assigns Ibn al-Fārid to the ahl al-waḥda may be related to the fact that Saʿīd ad-Dīn al-Farghānī often speaks of Wahdat-al-Wudschūd in his commentary on Ibn al-Fārid's Tāʾīya. Ibn al-Fārid himself never used this term in his poem.

Abd al-Ghani al-Nabulusi (d. 1731), writing a few centuries later, names Ibn ʿArabī, Ibn al-Fārid, ʿAfīf ad-Dīn at-Tilimsānī, Ibn Sabʿīn and Abd al-Karim al-Jili (d. 1424) as the main representatives of the Wahdat al-Wujūd doctrine.

=== Ibn Sawdakin ===
According to Ibn Saudakīn, the point of the letter Bā' contains all universal truths

An author who is not named by either Ibn Taimiyya or al-Nabulusi, but who explicitly mentions Wahdat al-Wujūd, was the Aleppian scholar Ibn Sawdakīn al-Nūrī (d. 1248), whose Nisba indicates that his father was a Mamluk of Nur al-Din Zengi. He was one of the first students of Ibn ʿArabī. He uses the term Wahdat al-Wujūd in his commentary on Ibn ʿArabī's work at-Taǧallīyāt al-Ilāhīya ("Divine Revelations"), right at the beginning, where he discusses the importance of the Basmala. There he devotes a separate section to the meaning of the point under the Bā' of the Basmala, where he explains that this point "with its allusion to a divine monistic truth (ḥaqīqa waḥdānīya ḥaqqa) includes the manifold truths like a seed that grows on the earth rich in potentialities into the world tree (šaǧarat al-kaun), with branches, roots, leaves, flowers and fruits." This is the universal tree (aš-šaǧara al-kullīya), whose fruit is "I am God, the Lord of the people of the world" (Sura 28:30). With this Koranic quotation, Ibn Saudakīn refers to the Qur'anic story about God's self-revelation in the Burning Bush. At the end of his remarks on this point he writes: "Whoever is informed about the secrets of these point worlds (ʿawālim nuqṭiyya) is also informed about the secrets of the unity of existence (waḥdat al-wujūd) with its ranks, relationships and detailed rules, and indeed about its compression and breakdown into a single point."

=== Ibn Sabʿīn ===
A thinker for whom the term Wahdat al-wujūd more clearly denotes a specific dogmatic position was Ibn Sabʿīn (d. 1270), who, like Ibn ʿArabī, came from Murcia. In his "Light Letter" (al-Risāla an-nūrīya) he identifies the unity of existence with the absolute unity (al-waḥda al-muṭlaqa) and explains that the person of the spiritual elite (insān ḫāṣṣat al-ḫāṣṣa) refrains from everything that belongs to the relative things such as time and place and active and passive, and does not deny the existence of what is in their existence if the existence is the same as the Whatness (māhīya). Here he follows the ideas of Yahyā al-Suhrawardī. In another of his epistles, Ibn Sabʿīn makes it clear that Wahdat-al-wujūd characterizes the world view of this spiritual elite:

The existent is either necessarily existent (wājib al-wujūd), which applies to the whole and the heness (huwīya), or it is contingently existent (mumkin al-wujūd), which applies to the part and the whatness. The divine lordship (rubūbiyya) is the heness, which is the whole, and the human servitude (ʿubūdiyya) is the whatness, which is the part. All reality related to the Heness by itself is called a whole (kull), and all reality related to the whatness by itself is called a part (ǧuzʾ). A whole has no existence except in a part, and a part has no existence except in a whole. Thus the whole is united with the part, and the two are connected to the origin, namely existence. The common people and the ignorant are ruled by the accidental (ʿāriḍ), namely multiplicity (kathra) and multitude (taʿaddud), while the chosen knowledgeable are ruled by the origin, namely the unity of existence (waḥdat al-wujūd). He who adheres to the origin does not experience distraction or restlessness. He remains established in his knowledge and understanding. But he who adheres to the branch experiences restlessness and distraction. Things become many in his eyes so that he forgets and becomes distracted and ignorant.

— Ibn Sabʿīn

=== Sadr al-Din al-Qunawi ===
One author who wrote more extensively on the unity of existence was Ibn ʿArabī's son-in-law, the Persian Sufi philosopher Sadr al-Dīn al-Qūnawī (1207-1274). Jāmi was of the opinion that Ibn ʿArabī's intention in the problem of the unity of existence could only be understood by those who studied and understood the investigations (taḥqīqāt) of Ṣadr al-Dīn in a manner corresponding to reason (ʿaql) and divine law (šarʿ).

Al-Qūnawī speaks about the unity of existence primarily in his philosophical treatise Miftāḥ ghayb al-jamʿ wa-l-wujūd. There he explains: "Know that the Truthful One (al-Ḥaqq; sc. God) is pure existence (al-wuǧūd al-maḥḍ), in which there is no diversity, and He is one in the sense of a true unity (waḥda ḥaqīqīya), compared to which no multiplicity can be thought." Everything that is perceived in the entities, al-Qūnawī further explains, colors, lights, surfaces, etc., are effects of existence (aḥkām al-wujūd), or relational forms (ṣuwar nisab) of His knowledge. What is perceived, however, is not identical with true existence (al-wujūd al-ḥaqq), because there is only one existence. Man cannot perceive existence because he is a true unity like the unity of existence (waḥdat al-wujūd), but because he is a truth that is distinguished by existence, life, knowledge, will and a firm relationship to what he wants to perceive.

Drawing on Neoplatonic emanation doctrines, al-Qūnawī explains further:

From the Real, in terms of the unity of its existence (waḥdat wujūdudihī), only the One emerges, because of the impossibility of the One revealing more than One. And this One, in our view, is the knowing existence (al-wujūd al-ʿālim), which is poured out upon the entities of the things produced (al-mufāḍ ʿalā aʿyān al-mukauwanāt), both upon that which exists and upon that which does not exist, but of whose (sc. future) existence there is already knowledge. This existence is common to the supreme reed pen (al-qalam al-aʿlā), which is the first existence and is also called 'the first intellect' (al-ʿaql al-auwal), and to the other existing things, contrary to what the theorists among the philosophers say. For according to the knowers of truth (al-muḥaqqiqūn), there is nothing but the Truthful One. And the cosmos is nothing that goes beyond the truths known by God from all eternity, which are initially non-existent (maʿdūm) […] and then were endowed with existence.

— Sadr ad-Dīn al-Qūnawī

The one existence that enters into the created contingent things, al-Qūnawī further explains, differs from the true hidden existence that is stripped bare of the entities and phenomena (maẓāhir) only by relations (nisab) and considerations (iʿtibārāt) such as emergence (ẓuhūr), individuation (taʿayyun), plurality that comes about through connection, admission of the judgment of commonality (ḥukm al-ištirāk), and similar qualifiers that are attained by means of connection to the phenomena. Regarding the relationship between the diversity in the world and the unity of existence, al-Qūnawī expresses himself in a similar way to Ibn Sabʿīn:

The perceived diversity of existing things that derive from the one existence is due to the diversity of the cosmic realities that contain them, not to the diversity of existence itself or to the fact that there are many existences that differ in their realities. For there is only one existence that appears different, diverse and numerous due to the diversity of the realities of the containers, although it does not multiply or increase in itself with regard to its separation from the places of appearance.

— Sadr ad-Dīn al-Qūnawī

Regarding the relationship between the one existence and the immutable entities (aʿyān thābita), al-Qūnawī says in another work:

The most unclear and obscure are the pluralities (taʿaddudāt) that arise through the effects of the fixed entities in the one existence. One imagines that the entities appear in existence and through existence. In reality, however, only their effects appear in existence, not the entities themselves. And they will never appear. The coming into being (ẓuhūr) only applies to existence, albeit under the condition of multiplication with the effects of the entities in it. Concealment (buṭūn), on the other hand, is an intrinsic property of entities and also of existence with regard to the conceptual understanding of their unity.

— Sadr ad-Dīn al-Qūnawī: an-Nuṣūṣ

== Statements by mystics in Persia and Transoxania ==
=== ʿAzīz al-Dīn Nasafī ===
One of the earliest Persophone authors to treat of wahdat al-wujūd was the Transoxian mystical thinker ʿAzīz ad-Dīn Nasafī (d. after 1281). He divided the Muslims broadly into three main categories, the "people of Sharia" (ahl-i šariʿat), who are in turn divided into Sunnis and Shiites, the "people of philosophy" (ahl-i ḥikmat), who are in turn divided into Avicennian philosophers and "transmigrationists" (ahl-i tanāsuḫ), and the "people of unity" (ahl-i waḥdat), which means the followers of the "unity of existence" (waḥdat al-wujūd). These "people of unity" are also divided into different groups, but they all share the belief that "existence is no more than one, that existence is God, and God is one existence, true, necessary, eternal and eternal, that in his existence there is no multiplicity or parts exist and apart from His existence nothing exists.”

According to ʿAzīz al-Dīn Nasafī, there are two large groups within the “People of Unity”, the “People of Fire” (aṣḥāb-i nār) and the “People of Light” (aṣḥāb-i nūr). The former are called “People of Fire” because for everyone who reaches this level, conceit and pride disappear and the person himself also becomes annihilated (nīst mīshawad). The effect of fire is that it first destroys everything it reaches and then disappears itself. According to ʿAzīz ad-Dīn Nasafī, the "followers of fire" are divided into two groups:

1. One group teaches that the visible world, which is the composite and divided world of bodies and darkness and is subject to change and decay, is the creation of God, but that this is only delusion (khayāl) and imagination and only has an imaginary, reflective and shadow-like existence.
2. The other group teaches that the visible world, which is the world of bodies and darkness, and the hidden world, which is the world of spirits and light, are something other than the Lord of the worlds, because the world of bodies is in opposition to the world of spirits and the world of darkness is in opposition to light, and God is free of opposites, attributes and names. That which is above the world of bodies and the world of spirits and in which there are no opposites, forms and images is a real existence, which is pure unity. It is the Necessary Existence (wājib al-wujūd) and the Lord of the worlds (khudāy-i ʿālam). The world of bodies, the world of spirits, the world of darkness and the world of light, on the other hand, are all just imagination and notion. They appear through the nature of the necessarily existing, but only have an imaginary, reflective and shadowy existence, like things that appear in water, in dreams or in a mirror. This, explains ʿAzīzald-Dīn Nasafī, is the school of thought of the supreme sheikh (shaykh al-mashāyikh) Ibn Sabʿīn and the sheikhs of the Maghreb, and he himself saw many people in his time who followed this school of thought.

=== Saʿīd al-Dīn al-Farghānī ===
Sadr ad-Dīn al-Qūnawī's student Saʿīd ad-Dīn al-Farghānī (d. ca. 1300) refers to the "unity of existence" several times in his commentaries on the poem at-Tāʾīya al-kubrā by Ibn al-Farid (d. 1235). In his Persian commentary Mašāriq ad-darārī, which is based on his transcripts of al-Qūnawī's explanations of this poem, he uses the expression waḥdat al-wuǧūd or similar formulations 41 times and in his extended Arabic commentary on the same work entitled Muntahā al-madārik, which reflects more of his own views, 22 times.

In ten places in his Persian commentary, al-Farghānī contrasts the unity of existence (waḥdat al-wujūd) with the "multiplicity of (sc. divine) knowledge" (kathrat al-ʿilm) or the "multiplicity of known things" (kathrat al-maʿlūmāt). Thus, al-Farghānī explains in one place that the soul is the place of appearance of the multiplicity of knowledge, while the spirit (rūḥ) is the manifestation and form of the unity of existence. He derives the fact that the spirit belongs to the world of Wahdat-al-wujūd from the Qur'anic statement in Surah 15:29, according to which God breathed his spirit into Adam.

In another passage that builds on this idea, al-Farghānī relates the unity of existence to the Sufi idea of Fanā' ("annihilation") and explains that there are three stages of extinction and annihilation (maḥw wa-fanā) that the traveller of the mystical path goes through. What the two versions of the passage have in common is the statement that the unity of existence is seen after the annihilation of the soul on the first stage. In the Persian commentary, the three stages are described as follows:

- The first stage is the extinction and annihilation of the soul and its attributes. In it, the unity of existence is seen (dar ū mašhūd-i waḥdat-i wuǧūd ast), insofar as it is reflected in the mirror of the multiplicity of the truths of knowledge and their attributes (dar āyīna-yi kathrat-i ḥaqāʾiq-i ʿilm wa-ṣifāt-i ū munṭabaʿ ast). Every time the mirror is full of reflections, the surface of the mirror is completely hidden and what is reflected stands out.
- The second stage is the extinction and annihilation of the spirit (rūḥ) and its attributes. The multiplicity of truths (kaṯrat-i ḥaqāʾiq) is seen in it, insofar as it is reflected in the mirror of the unity of existence (āyīna-yi waḥdat-i wuǧūd), which is the hiddenness of the spirit (bāṭin-i rūḥ). The unity, which is the mirror, is not revealed, but the multiplicity, which is what is reflected.
- The third stage is the extinction and annihilation of the confinement (taqayyud) to the two types of vision and the harmonization (jamʿ) between them.

In his Arabic commentary, al-Farghānī gives further explanations on the three stages. Since in the soul the real multiplicity is evident, but the unity of the individual evident existence (waḥdat al-wuǧūd al-ʿainī aẓ-ẓāhirī) is hidden, the traveller on the mystical path inevitably overcomes the unity over the multiplicity when the soul ceases to exist on the first stage, so that the multiplicity disappears completely. Since in the spirit the unity of the individual existence with its quality of simplicity is evident, but the multiplicity of the known realities with their distinctions is hidden, the unity disappears, when it is annihilated on the second stage, while the multiplicity of the known realities emerges. On the third stage of disintegration, the traveller on the mystical path experiences a harmonization between these two states.

In another passage in his Arabic commentary, al-Farghānī explains that the unity of existence is the opposite (khulf) to the veil of the multiplicity of existential truths (kathrat al-ḥaqāʾiq al-kawnīya), because as long as one of the effects and determinations of worldly existence (kaun) and its stages dominates someone or becomes apparent in him, neither the all-encompassingness (jamʿīya) of the unity of existence nor the non-existence of otherness in everything he perceives is revealed to him. Al-Farghānī repeats this thought a little later in slightly different words: As long as man is bound by the fetter of the determinations of being (maḥṣūr fī qaid al-aḥkām al-kaunīya), which include the consciousness of himself (al-shuʿūr bi-nafsihī), he is shielded from the witnessing of the unity of existence (shuhūd waḥdat al-wujūd).

=== ʿAbd al-Razzāq al-Kāshānī ===
The first lexicographical recording of the concept of wahdat al-wujūd has been produced by the Persian mystic Abd al-Razzaq Kāshānī (d. 1345). He explains it in his work Laṭāʾif al-iʿlām fī ishārāt ahl al-ilhām, a lexicon of the mystic terminology of the Ibn-ʿArabī-school. with the following words:

This means that it (existence) cannot be divided into the necessary (al-wājib) and the contingent (al-mumkin). According to this group (the followers of this doctrine), existence is not what the theorists of the Mutakallimūn and philosophers understand it to be. Most of them believe that existence is an accident (ʿaraḍ). Rather, existence, to which they attribute an accidental quality, is that matter through which the truth of everything that exists is verified. And that can be none other than the True One (al-Ḥaqq), exalted is His nature. Moreover, the essence (dhāt) described as oneness has two aspects: 1) the aspect of being one and encompassing the names and truths, and this, as you know, is the rank of union and existence (martabat al-jamʿ wa-l-wujūd), and 2) the aspect of being identical with those truths which it encompasses, while existence is the origin (aṣl) of those truths and is their clearest expression according to the sense faculties. Thus, existence is identical with essence.

— ʿAbd ar-Razzāq al-Qāshānī

== Development of the concept in India ==
A student of ʿAbd ar-Razzāq al-Qāshānī, Ashraf Jahangir Simnānī (d. 1405) introduced the concept of wahdat al-wujūd to India. He had originally been a student of ʿAlā' ad-Dawla al-Simnanī, but then turned away from him and joined al-Qāshānī. Under the latter he studied Ibn ʿArabī's work al-Futūḥāt al-Makkīya and al-Qāshānī's own Dictionary of Mystical Terms. He later travelled to India and settled in Jaunpur. A student of Ashraf al-Simnānī, Nizām ad-Dīn Yamanī, wrote a comprehensive work entitled Laṭāyif-i Ashrafī, which explains Ashraf al-Simnānī's views on a variety of topics in 60 chapters called laṭāyif. The 27th chapter is devoted to the proofs of the Wahdat al-wujūd doctrine. Here Yamanī quotes his teacher as saying that the innermost essence of the Sufi doctrines and the staple food of the people of knowledge is the theme of the unity of existence.

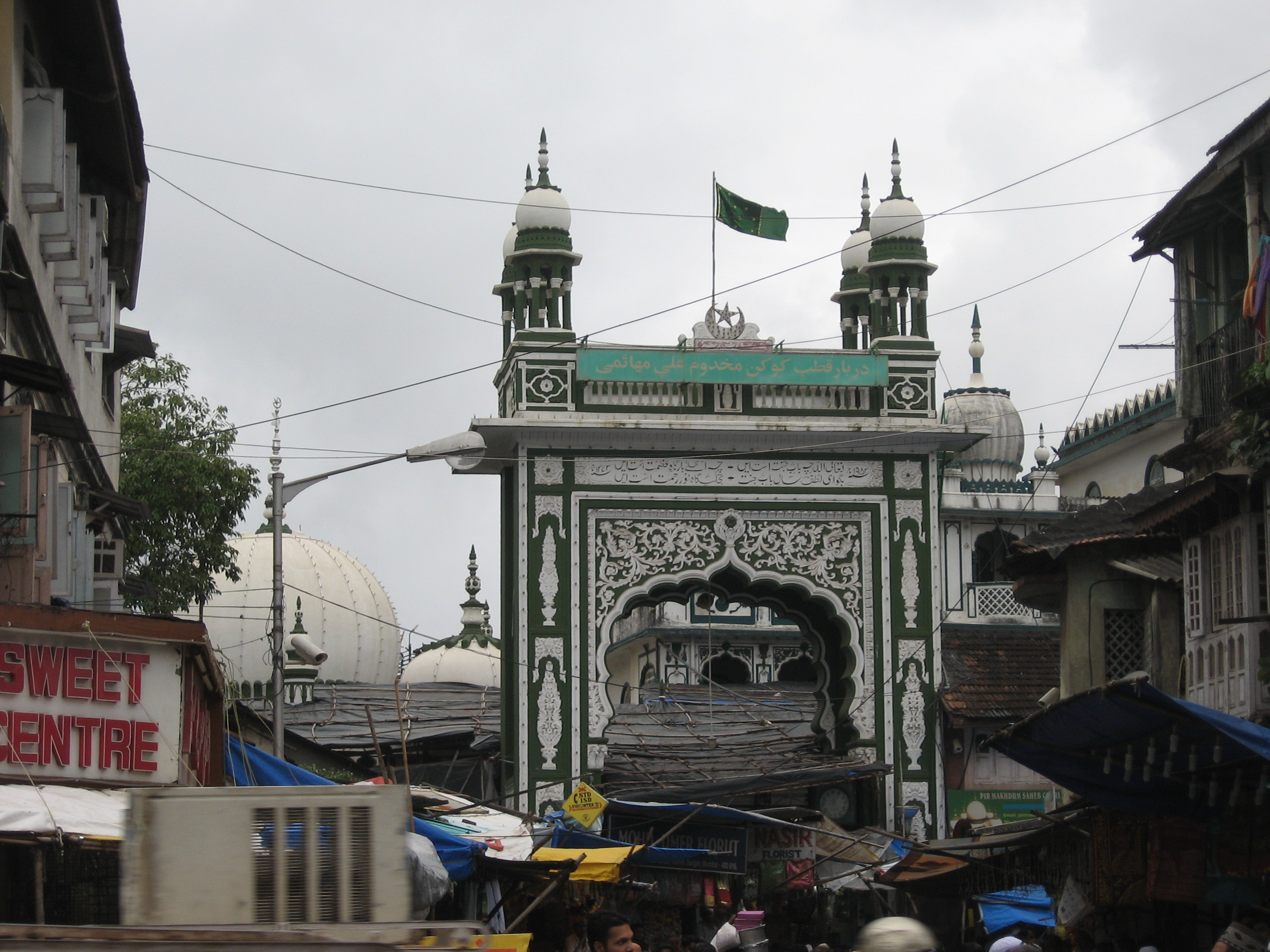
The tomb of Makhdūm ʿAlī al-Mahā'imī in Mumbai

Another transmitter of the wahdat al-wujūd doctrine to India was Makhdūm ʿAlī al-Mahā'imī (d. 1432), who belonged to the Arab seafaring community of Konkan. He wrote an annotated Arabic translation of the Persian treatise Risāla-yi Jām-i jahān-namā by Muhammad Shīrīn Maghribī (d. 1408), entitled Irāʾat al-ḥaqāʾiq fī sharḥ Mirʾāt al-ḥaqāʾiq, which deals with the relationship between the various aspects of divine unity (aḥadiyya, wāḥidiyya, waḥdat) and their relationship to the diversity of the manifested world. However, al-Mahā'imī warned in his commentary that "the doctrine of the unity of existence in everything" does not authorize one to teach "the divinity of every single thing" (ālihīyat kull wāḥid min al-ashyāʾ). For this doctrine only means that the totality of the existences of things is one matter, namely the appearance of the True One in its entirety (ẓuhūr al-ḥaqq fī l-kull), not that each individual one of the existing things is the totality in which the True One appears in its entirety.

However, proponents of the wahdat al-wujūd doctrine also had to fight resistance in India. This is shown by the case of the Chishtiyya Sufi Hasan Tāhir (d. 1503/4), who was related to Sultan Sikandar Lodi and settled in Delhi. It is narrated that he was once asked by his father, who rejected Ibn ʿArabī's book Fuṣūṣ al-ḥikam and forbade its reading, for an explanation of the doctrine of the unity of existence (tauḥīd-i wujūd). He then explained the problem in a way that attracted the attention of the literalist scholars (ʿulamā-yi ẓāhir), which led to the unravelling of "the knot of difficulty of the jurist" (ʿuqda-yi ishkāl-i maulawī) and his revocation of the reading prohibition.

Despite these resistances, the wahdat al-wujūd doctrine remained popular in India, and the Indian historian ʿAbd al-Qādir Badāʾūnī (d. 1597/98) reports that a Sufi sheikh named Tāj al-Dīn ibn Zakariyyā Ajūdhanī introduced this doctrine in evening sessions to the Mughal ruler Akbar (r. 1556–1605) and convinced him that he himself was the "perfect man" (insān kāmil) described by Ibn ʿArabī and his followers. Badā'ūnī was outraged because he considered Wahdat al-wujūd to be a teaching of "destructive Sufis" (Ṣūfīya-i mubaṭṭila), which ultimately leads to "immorality" (ibāḥat) and "heresy" (ilḥād). Badā'ūnī explained Taj al-Din's propagation of this doctrine with his not feeling bound by the religious rules (sharʿiyyāt). However, Ajūdhanī was not the only person at Akbar's court who was inclined towards the wahdat-al-wujūd doctrine. It is also reported that Akbar's court poet Faizi (d. 1595) was one of the Sufis who professed the unity of existence.

A particularly influential elaboration of the wahdat al-wujūd doctrine from India was the work al-Tuḥfa al-mursala ilā l-Nabī by Fadlallāh al-Burhānpūrī (d. 1619), an indirect student of Muhammad Ghaus (d. 1563). It begins with the statement that "the True One - praised be He and exalted" (al-ḥaqq subḥānahū wa-taʿālā) is existence. This existence is one, but its garments (albās) are different and varied. None of the changeable things (kāʾināt), not even an atom, lacks existence. The work was later commented on by Ibrahim al-Kurani (d. 1690), Abd al-Ghani al-Nabulusi (d. 1731) and Abū l-Khayr al-Suwaydī (d. 1786).

On the Indian subcontinent, the concept of wahdat al-wujūd became so popular that authors from this region discovered it also among mystics who were only loosely connected with Islam. At the beginning of the 17th century, the author of the Dabistān-i madhāhib wrote about the North Indian poet Kabir that after his encounter with Ramananda, sublime words from him about wahdat al-wujūd became famous, such as only the mystical "seekers of truth" (muḥaqqiqān) could utter.

== Critics and opponents of the concept ==
=== Ibn Taymiyya ===
One of the earliest critics of the wahdat al-wujūd doctrine was the Hanbalite scholar Ibn Taymiyya (d. 1329). According to him, the proponents of this doctrine claimed that the existence of the created was identical with the existence of the Creator. Ibn Taimīya saw in this an emptying and denial of the Creator, which included all forms of Shirk. He attributes to Ibn ʿArabī the teaching that the existence of every thing is identical with the existence of the Truthful (wujūd kull shayʾ ʿayn wujūd al-Ḥaqq).

In another text in which Ibn Taymiyya discusses this "doctrine of unity" (madhhab al-waḥda), he explains that according to it existence is one, the Creator God has no existence separate from the existence of the created, and God unites in himself the evil in the world (al-sharr fī l-ʿālam). He thought that the starting point of their error (mabdaʾ ḍalālihim) lay in the fact that the followers of this doctrine do not recognize God as having an existence separate from the existence of the created. He also accuses them of drawing on the teachings of philosophers, the false teachings of the Sufis and Mutakallimūn and the teachings of the Qarmatians and Bātinites, of wandering around "before the doors of the various schools of thought" and of pursuing the lowest goals.

=== Sufi critics ===
==== ʿAlā' al-Dawla al-Simnānī ====
At about the same time as Ibn Taimiyya, the Persian Sufi ʿAlā' ad-Dawla al-Simnānī (d. 1336) criticized the wahdat-al-wujūd doctrine. As his former student Ashraf Jahangir Simnānī reports, he had a correspondence about this with his contemporary ʿAbd al-Razzāq al-Qāshānī. It is also reproduced in the Nafaḥāt al-Uns by Jami (d. 1492), and from this work Herrmann Landolt translated it into German. The cause for the correspondence was that Iqbāl-i Sistānī, another student of ʿAlā' ad-Daula, had met al-Qāshānī at Soltaniyeh and had asked him about the doctrine of wahdat-al-wujūd. When al-Qāshānī asked him what his sheikh thought of Ibn ʿArabī and his words, Iqbāl-i Sistānī replied that although his sheikh considered Ibn ʿArabī to be a great man, he believed that he was wrong in his teaching of God as the absolute existence. Al-Qāschānī then replied that this very statement was the basic principle of all his mystical insights and that there was no better statement than this. It is strange, he continued, that his sheikh disapproved of it, although all prophets, men of God and authorities had followed this school of thought. When Iqbāl-i Sistānī told this to his sheikh ʿAlā' ad-Daula as-Simnānī, he wrote in response:

No one in any group or sect has ever expressed himself with such shamelessness. And if you look into the matter closely, you will find that the teachings of the 'naturalists' and materialists are far better. Much has already been written to condemn and refute these words.

When al-Qāshānī learned of this, he wrote a letter to ʿAlā' ad-Dawla as-Simnānī defending the doctrine of wahdat al-wujūd. In response to this letter, ʿAlā' ad-Dawla as-Simnānī wrote a reply with new attacks against this doctrine. In it he referred to Ibn ʿArabī's introductory words in his work al-Futūḥāt al-Makkīya: "Glory be to Him who creates everything (in the world) and is (at the same time) one with it", and commented:

If you heard someone say: 'The excrement of the sheikh is identical with the existence of the sheikh (wujūd al-shaykh), you would by no means let him get away with it, but would be angry with him. How then is it possible for a rational person to relate such nonsense to God, the King and Judge? Return to God, through sincere Tawba, so that you escape this dangerous abyss from which even the materialists, the naturalists, the Greeks (i.e. the philosophers) and the Buddhists shrink back! Peace be upon him who follows the right guidance (Sura 20:47)!

— ʿAlā' ad-Dawla al-Simnānī

==== ʿAbd al-Karīm al-Jīlī ====
The Yemeni Sufi Abd al-Karim al-Jili (d. 1428), who is classed with the Ibn-ʿArabī school, criticized the prevailing understanding of wahdat al-wujūd with a theological argument. In his commentary on the Risālat al-Khalwa by Ibn ʿArabī, he writes:

A large group of those who teach the unity of existence agree that things exist externally, as is the doctrine of the theoreticians (nuẓẓār). But they say that they exist through an existence that is God, the True One, not through an existence that is added to the existence of God, the True One. This, however, is not the doctrine of the perfect People of Complete Revelation (kummal aṣḥāb al-kashf al-tāmm). It comes only from people who mix philosophy (ḥikma) with the saying of the People of God (ahl Allāh) and have absorbed their teachings according to what they thought best. If you are one of the masters of the heart (arbāb al-qulūb), you know that God already existed without anything being with Him, and the contingent things at this level have no existence except in the knowledge presence (al-ḥaḍra al-ʿilmiyya).

— ʿAbd al-Karīm al-Jīlī

==== Ibn Abī l-Hasan al-Bakrī ====
Another Sufi who opposed the doctrine of wahdat al-wujūd was the Egyptian sheikh Ibn Abī l-Hasan al-Bakrī (d. 1586). Like al-Simnānī, he expressed his respect for Ibn ʿArabī, but at the same time rejected the idea of wahdat al-wujūd. At the beginning of his Dīwān he warns the reader that the text contains some Qasīdas and poetic passages "in the style of those who teach the unity of existence (ʿalā asālīb al-qāʾilīn bi-waḥdat al-wuǧūd)", and then distances himself from it: "God forbid that this becomes the doctrine of ours! Rather, our doctrine is what the Sunnis (ahl as-sunna wa-l-ǧamāʿa) believe in.” He justifies the fact that he nevertheless included these pieces in his Dīwān with the subtlety of their meaning. In one of the poems of the Dīwān, however, al-Bakrī takes up the condemnation of the proponents of this doctrine again. There he exclaims:

كم أناس توعلوا في دعاوي
زعموا أنهم من الأبرار
أطلقوا وحدة الوجود وقالوا
كل شىء هو الإله الباري
يا لقومي ما لطه نصير
خاب من لم يكن من الأنصار

Kam unās tawaʿʿalū fī daʿāwī
Zaʿamū annahum min al-abrār
Aṭlaqū waḥdata l-wujūd wa-qālū
Kullu shayʾin huwa l-ilāhu l-bārī
Yā la-qawmī mā li-Ṭāhā naṣīr
Ḫāba man lam yakun min al-anṣār

How many people have made lofty claims
And claimed that they were among the righteous!
They have invoked the oneness of existence and said:
“All is God the Creator!”
O my people, is there nobody coming to the aid of Tāhā (= the Prophet)?
He who was not among the helpers will be disappointed.

As an alternative concept, Ibn Abī l-Hasan al-Bakrī contrasted the “unity of existence” with the “unity of experience” (waḥdat al-shuhūd). In his work Tabʿīd al-minna fī taʾyīd as-sunna, which he completed in Mecca in 1552, he wrote: “The unity is experiential, not ontological (al-waḥda shuhūdiyya lā wujūdiyya)”.

==== ʿAlī al-Qārī ====
Ibn Abī l-Hasan al-Bakrī's student Ali al-Qari (d. 1606) took a similar position. In his writings he distinguished between the Wujūdis, i.e. those who teach the "unity of existence", and Shuhūdis, i.e. representatives of the doctrine of the "unity of experience". He considered the former to be misguided, while the latter were the "representatives of the true doctrine" (ahl al-ḥaqq). Al-Qārī also wrote a separate treatise against the followers of the wahdat-al-wujūd doctrine entitled al-Martaba al-shuhūdiyya fī l-manzila al-wujūdiyya. The reason for this was that he had been told that "an ignorant Sufi" (baʿḍ jahalat al-mutaṣawwifa) had his novices say the following formula during initiation: "I believe that all things are united with God from their inner side, but from their outer side they are different from Him and are something other than Him." When al-Qārī described this in conversation as a heresy leaning towards the wahdat-al-wujūd doctrine, he was asked to explain this in more detail, whereupon he wrote his treatise.

However, in the early phase of his literary activity, al-Qārī seems to have at least partially accepted the wahdat al-wujūd doctrine. This is evident in his treatment of the theory of the concentric nesting of universal sacred knowledge, already advocated by Ibn Sawdakīn (see above). According to this theory, the Qur'an contains the essence of all other holy books, the Fatiha the essence of the Qur'an, the Basmala the essence of the Fātiha, the Bā' the essence of the Basmala and the point of the Bā' the essence of the Bā'. Al-Qārī explains this in his commentary on the prayer collection Ḥizb al-fatḥ by Abū l-Hasan al-Bakrī: "Perhaps the point is a reference to the level of Wahdat al-wujūd of the worshipped one, from which everything emanates, to which everything returns and around which everything revolves."

=== Ahmad Sirhindī ===
==== His initial sympathy for Wahdat al-wujūd ====
Among the Sufi critics of the Wahdat al-wujūd doctrine was the Indian Naqshbandi Ahmad Sirhindi (d. 1624). However, instead of Wahdat al-wujūd he mostly used the term Tawhid wujūdī, with which he perhaps wants to express that it is not an objective reality, but a special way of perceiving reality. Sirhindī admits that he was initially very inclined towards this doctrine. The development of Sirhindī's attitude towards this doctrine can be traced through his letters (Maktūbāt). In letter 31 of the first volume he states that he believed in this doctrine from an early age and enjoyed it very much, and that his father had also always adhered to it. Later, when Sheikh Bāqī bi-Llāh introduced him to the method of the Naqshbandī order, the existential unity (tauḥīd wuǧūdī) was revealed to him after only a short time. He was completely absorbed in this experience, and the ideas associated with it flowed into him.

Sirhindī describes the next stage of his development in Letter 160. There he explains that after studying the sciences he adopted a more distanced attitude towards existential unity, without completely rejecting this doctrine. For a long time he remained in this state of indecision until he finally began to turn away from it. He was shown that existential unity was a low level from which he had to ascend to the level of shadowhood (ẓillīya). At this level he realized that he and the world were only a shadow (ẓill) of God. He would have gladly remained at this level because of its proximity to Wahdat al-wujūd, which he still considered the epitome of perfection. Then he was raised by God to the level of subserviency (ʿabdiyya). Only then did he realize that Wahdat al-wujūd was not the highest stage on the mystical path.

However, Sirhindī remained committed to the wahdat al-wujūd doctrine for a long time. In the 44th letter of the second volume, he attempted to reinterpret it in a way that no longer appeared heretical. The reason for this was that he was asked by a scholar named Muhammad Sādiq what to think of the fact that the Sufis taught the unity of existence and the scholars considered this doctrine to be unbelief and freethinking, although both parties were Sunnis. He replied that the dispute between the two parties was only due to a difference in expression (lafẓ). For the Sufis, things are not identical with God, but only manifestations of the Truthful One (ẓuhūrāt-i Ḥaqq). Things are therefore from God, not God Himself. When they say: "Everything is He" (hama ūst), they mean that everything comes from Him. This is also the preferred view of the scholars. Thus the dispute between the two sides is not based on reality. Rather, the two doctrines amount to the same thing. The only difference is that the Sufis taught that things are reflections of the manifestations of God, but the scholars also avoided this expression because they wanted to avoid the false impression of incarnation (ḥulūl) and becoming one with God (ittiḥād). Both the Sufis who taught the unity of existence and the scholars who opted for multiplicity are speaking the truth. For the Sufis, unity is appropriate and for the scholars, multiplicity.

And in the 291st letter of the first volume, Sirhindī defended the wahdat-al-wujūd doctrine against criticism from ʿAlā' al-Dawla al-Simnānī and others, arguing that existential monism in one group of them stems from the frequency of contemplation of Tawhid and reflection on the creed Lā ilāh illā Llāh, and in the other group from ecstasy (injidhāb) and love of God in the heart (maḥabbat-i qalbī). He himself should be careful not to criticize these people because this idea occurs to them involuntarily (bī irāda) and they are therefore excused.

==== Classification of Wahdat al-wujūd as a heretical doctrine ====
At a certain point, however, Ahmad Sirhindī began to regard the Wahdat al-wujūd doctrine as a heretical doctrine. The background was that he saw the danger of inherent antinomianism in this doctrine. As he himself writes in his 43rd letter of the first volume, the reason for his writing was that most of his contemporaries "clung to the hem of this existential unity" (dast ba-dāman-i īn tauḥīd-i wuǧūdī zada-and) and had come to the conclusion that the whole thing was from God or was God himself, and with this trick had pulled their necks out of the noose of Sharia duties. Some did this because of Taqlīd, others purely because of knowledge, still others because of knowledge mixed with "taste" (dhawq), and finally some because of Ilhād and freethinking (zandaqa). These people, Sirhindī further explains, invent all kinds of lies about the Sharia rules and enjoy their lives. Even if they accept the Sharia commandments, they consider them "parasitic" (ṭufaylī) and imagine that the real goal lies behind the Sharia. At the end, Sirhindī expresses his personal disgust for this bad bad belief (iʿtiqād sūʾ) with an Arabic phrase.

In the 160th letter, Sirhindī divides the Sufi sheikhs into three groups:

1. The first group teaches that the world exists "externally" (dar khārij) through the creation of the True One and that everything that is shown in it in terms of perfection and imperfection comes from His creative activity. They consider themselves nothing more than phantoms (shabaḥ) and compare themselves with someone who is naked and then puts on someone else's clothes, fully aware that they are borrowed clothes.
2. The second group teaches that the world is the shadow (ẓill) of the True One, but exists in the external world, albeit only as a shadow (ba-ṭarīq-i ẓillīyat), not as an independent entity (ba-ṭarīq-i aṣālat). The existence of the world thus exists through the existence of God, just as the shadow exists through the body that casts the shadow.
3. Finally, the third group teaches the unity of existence (waḥdat-i wujūd). This means that there is only one thing that exists in the external world, namely the essence of the True One (dhāt al-Ḥaqq). In their view, the world does not have any realization in the external world, but only a knowledge-based determination (thubūt-i ʿilmī). Therefore, they said: "The entities have not smelled the odor of existence." Although this group says that the world is a shadow of the Truth, they teach that their shadowy existence exists only on the level of perception, but is nonexistent in reality and in the external world.

The third group, explains Sirhindī, has achieved perfection like the other two, but their speech leads the people into error and heresy. The first group, on the other hand, is more perfect, and its teachings are more in accordance with the Koran and Sunnah.

In the 272nd letter, Sirhindī once again deals in great detail with the doctrine of wahdat al-wujūd. Here he quotes some proponentes of this doctrine as claiming that the prophets had hidden the secrets of existential unity from the masses because of their weak minds. These people would call those who believed in the plurality of existence and avoided worshipping anything other than God associators. Conversely, they would consider those who believed in the unity of existence, even if they worshipped a thousand idols, as monotheists (muwaḥḥid), because they considered them to be manifestations of God. Sirhindī firmly rejects this idea:

The prophets never called for the unity of existence (waḥdat al-wujūd) and never called those who believed in the plurality of existence as associators. Rather, they called for the unity of the worshipped God (waḥdat al-maʿbūd) and described the worship of anything else as association. Even if the Wujūdi Sufis do not classify that which is not God as otherness, they do not escape association. But that which is not God is not God, whether they recognize it or not.

==== The “unity of experience” as an alternative ====
Sirhindī adopted the concept of the "unity of experience" from Ibn Abī l-Hasan al-Bakrī, which he does not call waḥdat al-shuhūd, but tawḥīd shuhūdī ("experiential unity"), parallel to the term tawḥīd wujūdī used by him. According to him, the difference between existential and experiential unity is that in the former, the walker of the mystical path sees only the One and nothing else, while in the latter he believes that the existent is one, considers everything else to be non-existent and, despite its non-existence, considers it to be manifestations (majālī) and phenomena (maẓāhir) of this One. While "experiential unity" is one of the necessities of the mystical path, because without it the Fanā' state and the "seeing of certainty" (ʿayn al-yaqīn) cannot be achieved, this does not apply to existential unity; it is therefore not necessary. Sirhindī compares the followers of existential unity to people who look at the sun during the day and deny the existence of the stars because they cannot see them at that time. However, the followers of experiential unity know in this situation that the stars continue to exist, even if they cannot see them. The doctrine of existential unity, which in this way denies everything other than the one being, is in Sirhindī's opinion in contradiction with reason and religious law.

Sirhindī also rejects the view that the unity of existence is a doctrine that had already been advocated by other Sufis before Ibn ʿArabī, such as al-Hallaj (d. 922) with his statement "I am the truthful one" (anā al-Ḥaqq) or Bayazid Bastami (d. 875) with his exclamation "Praise be to me. How great is my rank!" (subḥānī, mā aʿẓama shaʾnī). According to him, these can rather be traced back to the experiential unity. He considered the unity of existence, however, to be a heretical doctrine that differs fundamentally from the teachings of classical Sufism. He writes in his 272nd letter:

The first person to clearly express the doctrine of existential unity (tawḥīd wujūdī) was Sheikh Muhyī l-Dīn Ibn ʿArabī. Although the expressions of the preceding sheikhs make the doctrine of unity perceptible and testify to becoming one with God (ittiḥād), they can still be interpreted in the sense of the doctrine of experiential unity (tawḥīd shuhūdī). Thus, one of them said, when he saw nothing other than reality: 'In my garment there is nothing but God (laysa fī jubbatī siwā Llāh)'. Others of them said: 'Glory be to Me (subḥānī)' and 'There is none in the House but me.' All these expressions are flowers plucked from the branch of the vision of the One (ruʾyat al-wāḥid). But none of them contains any reference to existential unity. The one who elaborated the problem of the unity of existence in chapters and sections and established their syntax and grammar was Shaykh Muhyī l-Dīn Ibn al-ʿArabī.

— Ahmad Sirhindī

Sirhindī also counters the impression that wahdat al-wujūd is a fundamental teaching of the Naqshbandiyya. When it is said, he argues, that wahdat al-wujūd is explicitly mentioned in the expressions of the sheikhs of this order, his answer is that they made these expressions in the midst of ecstatic states (aḥwāl), but then turned away from this station (maqām), as was the case with him. As a result, Sirhindī explains, one can state that existential unity is not needed to achieve the mystical states of Fanā' and Baqāʾ and to attain the minor or major friendship with God, but experiential unity is indispensable for the realization of the Fanā' and the forgetting of everything non-divine.

According to some later scholars, Ahmad Sirhindī rendered Islam a great service by combating the doctrine of wahdat al-wujūd. The Indian scholar Siddiq Hasan Khan (d. 1889) wrote about him:

One of his achievements was that he made clear the difference between the unity of existence (waḥdat al-wujūd) and the unity of experience (waḥdat al-shuhūd) and explained that the unity of existence afflicts the walker on the mystical path along the way, but the truth of the unity of experience is revealed to the one who ascends to a higher mystical station (maqām). In this way, he closed the path to heresy (ilḥād) for many who used to cover themselves with the costume of the Sufis.

=== Shiite opponents of the concept ===
==== Muqaddas Ardabīlī ====
On the Imamite-Shii side, the wahdat-al-wujūd doctrine was criticized by the Iraqi scholar Muqaddas Ardabīlī (d. 1585). He dealt with the followers of this doctrine in his book Ḥadīqat al-Shīʿa ("Garden of the Shi'a") in a separate chapter dedicated to the beliefs of the various Sufi groups. The first group mentioned here is the Wahdatīya. These are those who teach the unity of existence and consider every person and every thing to be God. Ardabīlī thinks that this group is worse than Nimrod, Shaddād ibn ʿĀd and Pharaoh because they consider all things to be God, even things that are considered impure according to the Sharia. Actually, it would be more appropriate to call this group Kathratīya ("followers of multiplicity") because they took the multiplicity of God so far that they considered everything non-divine to be God. Nevertheless, in their belief all this is one.

==== Muhammad Tāhir al-Qummī ====
Another Imamite opponent of the wahdat-al-wujūd doctrine was the Iranian scholar Muhammad Tāhir al-Qummī (d. 1689), who held the office of Shaykh al-Islām in Qom. He devoted the last part of his anti-philosophical polemic Ḥikmat al-ʿārifīn to the rejection of this doctrine. In it he declared the unity of existence to be meaningless, on the grounds that existence is one of the secondary conceptual things (maʿqūlāt) that the mind creates from all contingents that are realized in the external world. In his treatise, Al-Qummī first deals with statements by Dawūd al-Qayṣarī (d. 1350), Jāmi (d. 1492) and Mulla Sadra (d. 1635), all three of whom he presents as advocates of the wahdat-al-wujūd doctrine, Regarding Mulla Sadra, he states that he has not provided proof that the realities of contingent things are rays of light (ashiʿʿa wa-aḍwāʾ) of existence belonging to the necessary (al-wujūd al-wājibī), but only that contingent things are their effects (āṯār wa-majʿūlāt), which, however, does not necessarily entail the unity of existence that he claims. Finally, al-Qummī moves on to Muhyī d-Dīn Ibn ʿArabī, whom he presents, like as-Sirhindī, as the actual founder of the wahdat-al-wujūd doctrine. In his polemic against him, he mocks that he is in reality not a muḥyī d-dīn (“reviver of religion”), but a mumīt al-dīn (“killer of religion”), and tries to discredit him as a liar:

It is known that the wahdat-al-wujūd doctrine first arose and became known through the Andalusian Hanbalite Muhyī l-Dīn Ibn al-ʿArabī and his followers, and this man was extremely stupid and weak-minded, as will become clear from his speech. […] He wrote a book containing various kinds of disbelief and heresy, such as that he is the Seal of the Friends of God (ḫātam al-auliyāʾ), that all the prophets and friends of God received knowledge from him and took it from his lamp, that he is the holder of universal prophethood and that all the prophets came to him to congratulate him on the rank of the Seal of the Friends of God, and that he did not eat or drink anything for nine months. […] Among his false and vicious claims is the claim of the unity of existence. A large community of incompetent fools believed what he claimed. However, a community of intelligent and insightful men declared him a liar and classified him as an unbeliever.

The fact that al-Qummī considers Ibn ʿArabī to be a Hanbalite is due to his belief that the Hanbalites are split into two groups: 1. the Corporeists (mujassima), who believe that God is a body, 2. the Sufis, who teach that God can be perceived with the senses, although he is not a body. The latter is the school of thought of Muhyī d-Dīn Ibn al-ʿArabī. Overall, al-Qummī believes that the doctrine of the unity of existence with all its meanings is nonsense (bāṭil) and its falsehood is necessarily evident from religion, so that setting forth rational or tradition-based evidence to refute it is not necessary.

==== Al-Maqbalī ====
A Zaydi scholar who strongly criticized the wahdat al-wujūd doctrine was Sālih ibn Mahdī al-Maqbalī (d. 1696). In his work al-ʿAlam al-shāmikh fī īthār al-ḥaqq ʿalā l-ābāʾ wa-l-mashāyikh he reports on a debate he had about this doctrine in Medina with the Kurdish scholar Muhammad ibn ʿAbd ar-Rasūl al-Barzanjī (d. 1691). In this conversation, Al-Barzanjī expressed his conviction that the Book, i.e. the Qur'an, and the Sunnah were full of proofs for the unity of existence. Al-Maqbalī, on the other hand, ruled that this teaching was "the greatest error" (akbar ḍalāla) that existed among people. To him, it was surprising that no doubts had been expressed about it. Al-Barzanjī's statement that the Qur'an and Sunnah are full of evidence for the unity of existence was rejected by al-Maqbalī as a lie and slander against these holy texts.

== The defense of the concept with Qur'an and Hadith ==
=== The list in Yamanī's Laṭāyif-i Ashrafī ===
In order to defend the Wahdat-al-wujūd doctrine against critics, proponents of this doctrine compiled lists of Qur'anic verses and hadiths that were supposed to prove its truth. A first list with six Qur'anic verses and two hadiths can be found in the Laṭāyif-i Ashrafī by Nizām ad-Dīn Yamanī, in which he recorded the sayings of his teacher Ashraf Jahangir Simnānī (d. 1405). The six Qur'anic verses that are listed here and commented on in detail with regard to their evidential value are: 1. "Say: He is God, the One" (Sura 112, 1); 2. "He is God, the One, the Subduer" (Sura 39:4), 3. "Worship God and do not associate anything with Him" (Sura 4:36), 4. "There is no equal to Him. He is the Hearer, the Seeer" (Sura 42:11), 5. "Everything passes away - except His face" (Sura 28:88) and 6. "Wherever you turn, there is the face of God" (Sura 2:115).

Among the hadiths cited by Ashraf Jahangir Simnanī to prove that existence is one is the alleged saying of the Prophet, "Whoever has seen me has seen the Truthful One (man raʾānī fa-qad raʾā l-ḥaqq)". This is presented as a clear proof of the unity of existence. In its correct form, however, the saying is: “Whoever has seen me ‘in a dream’ has seen the Truthful One (‘man raʾānī ‘fī l-manām’ fa-qad raʾā l-ḥaqq’)”

=== Fadlallāh al-Burhānpūrī's list ===
Fadlallāh al-Burhānpūrī (d. 1619) listed in his work al-Tuḥfa al-mursala ilā n-Nabī an even larger number of Quranic passages and Prophetic sayings which, in his opinion, prove the truth of the wahdat-al-wujūd doctrine. The passages of the Qur'an include:

- Sura 2:115 “To God belongs the East and the West: wherever you turn, there is the face of God.”
- Sura 50:16 “We (sc. God) are nearer to him (sc. to man) than to the jugular vein” and Sura 56:85 “and we are nearer to him than you, but you cannot see (it).”
- Sura 48:10 “Those who pledge allegiance to you pledge it to God. God’s hand is above their hand.”
- Sura 57:3 “He (sc. God) is the First and the Last, the Visible and the Unseen. And He is Knowing of all things.”
- Sura 51:21 “And in yourselves (sc. are signs of God). Can you not see?"
- Sura 2:186 "When my servants ask about me, I am near."
- Sura 8:17 "It was not you who threw when you threw, but God."
- Sura 4:126 "And God encompasses all things."

Among the sayings of the Prophet that al-Burhānpūrī quotes to prove the truth of the wahdat-al-wujūd doctrine, are:

- the hadith reported in Sahih Muslim: "The truest word that the Arabs have ever uttered is the dictum of Labīd: 'Is not everything vain except God?'".
- the hadith narrated in Sahih al-Bukhari: “When anyone of you rises for ritual prayer, then he should only converse with his Lord, for his Lord is between him and the Qibla.”
- the Hadith qudsi narrated in Sahīh al-Bukhari: “Through supererogatory actions (nawāfil) my servant draws ever closer to me until I love him. And when I love him, I am his hearing with which he hears, his sight with which he sees, his hand with which he strikes, and his foot with which he walks.”
- the Hadith qudsī narrated in Sahīh Muslim: “God says: O man, I was sick and you did not visit me. I was hungry and you did not give me food […]”.
- and the word of the prophet in the hadith about the distance between the seven heavens and seven earths, reported by al-Tirmidhi among others: “By the one in whose hand Muhammad’s soul is: If you were to lower a rope to the lowest earth, it would fall on God.”

With the exception of the second hadith, which is attributed to Anas ibn Malik, all other hadiths mentioned are attributed to Abu Hurayra. ʿAbd al-Ghanī al-Nābulusī, who commented on al-Burhānpūrī's work, also thought that the following prophetic saying, which was narrated by al-Tirmidhī among others, clearly enunciates Wahdat al-wujūd : “God – blessed and exalted be He – created His creation in darkness and caused His light to fall upon it. Whoever His light reaches will be guided, and whoever it misses will go astray.”

== Discussion in the 17th and 18th century ==
=== Ahmad al-Qushashī ===
After the opponents of the wahdat al-wujūd doctrine had dominated the intellectual climate in the Hijaz in the late 16th and early 17th centuries, this doctrine celebrated a comeback with the Medinan scholar Ahmad al-Qushashī (d. 1661). Al-Muhibbī, in his biographical lexicon of personalities of the 11th Islamic century, referred to him as the Imam of those who teach the unity of existence (imām al-qāʾilīn bi-waḥdat al-wujūd). ِAl-Qushashī wrote a treatise entitled Kalimat al-jūd bi-l-baiyina wa-l-shuhūd ʿalā l-qawl bi-waḥdat al-wujūd ("The Treatise on the Doctrine of the Unity of Existence Generously Equipped with Evidence"), which is currently only available in manuscript form. In it, he explained that wahdat al-wujūd meant that there was no partner for God in His existence; the contingent things consisted exclusively of His objects of knowledge, His actions and His creatures. In addition, in the treatise he quoted the Ottoman Sheikh Islam Kemal-Paşa-zâde (d. 1534) as saying that it is the ruler's responsibility to convert people to the doctrine of the unity of existence (yajib ʿalā walī al-amr an yaḥmil an-nās ʿalā l-qawl bi-waḥdat al-wujūd). Al-Qushashī claims to have seen this in an autograph by Kemal-Paşa-zâde. Although there is a fatwa by Kemal-Pasha-zade to protect the teachings of Ibn ʿArabī, wahdat al-wujūd is not mentioned in it.

Ahmad al-Qushashī also formulated his own theological doctrine with the doctrine of the "unity of attributes" (waḥdat al-ṣifāt). His student Ibrāhīm al-Kūrānī (see below) referred to this doctrine as "the sister" of the doctrine of wahdat al-wujūd and was of the opinion that al-Qushashī's efforts in laying the foundations of it were similar to those of Ibn ʿArabī regarding wahdat al-wujūd.

=== Ibrāhīm al-Kūrānī ===
Another important proponent of the doctrine of wahdat al-wujūd in the Hijaz was al-Qushashī's student Ibrāhīm al-Kūrānī (d. 1690), who dedicated several works to it. The most important of these was his commentary Itḥāf al-dhakī on the work al-Tuḥfa al-mursala ilā l-Nabī by Fadlallāh al-Burhānpūrī (see above). Al-Kūrānī wrote this commentary at the request of students from Southeast Asia (Bilād Ǧāwā) who were staying in Medina. Al-Burhānpūrī had begun his work with the statement that God is existence. Al-Kūrānī took this statement as the starting point for admonitions, which he divided into seven sections. In the fifth section he admonishes the reader: "The first duty that befalls the one who strives after this noble science (sc. ʿilm al-ḥaqāʾiq = metaphysics) is that he should be fully aware that there is no contradiction between the belief in the unity of existence (tawḥīd al-wujūd) on the one hand and the Sharia and the imposition of command and prohibition on the other." The unity of existence, which entails that those addressed when duties are imposed are individuations (taʿayyunāt) of the absolute existence and manifestations of the names of the true God, does not mean that they are no longer burdened with duties because it is God who has created them and they are like prisoners in his hand. According to al-Kūrānī, the assumption that unity and existence and the divine imposition of duties contradict each other stems from the fact that the people concerned did not correctly understand the concept of acquisition (kasb), which is based on the unity of existence.

In the seventh section, al-Kūrānī admonishes the reader to be aware that the profession of the unity of existence does not contradict the statement of the master of the Sufis al-Junayd: "Tawhid is the separation of the pre-existent from the produced" (al-tawḥīd ifrād al-qadīm min al-muḥdath), nor the teaching of the Sunnis that tawhīd is the rejection of the likening (tashbīh) of God with creation on the one hand and the complete emptying (taʿṭīl) of God on the other. Regarding the statement of al-Junayd, al-Kūrānī considers that the doctrine of the unity of existence does not contradict it because its proponents have clearly stated that the universal truths (al-ḥaqāʾiq al-kullīya) are limited to three types:

1. a part of them is related to the True One (al-Ḥaqq) and belongs to Him. These include divinity (ulūhīya), the all-encompassing essential mercy (al-raḥma al-dhātīya), which in terms of abundance (al-fayyāḍīya) is existence, necessity (wujūb), permanence (al-qaiyūmīya), which is subsistence in itself, the establishment of others, self-sufficiency (al-ghinā al-dhātī), and the like.
2. the second part is related to the world (kawn) and belongs to it. These include need (al-faqr), essential nothingness (al-ʿadmīya al-dhātīya), lowliness (dhilla), contingency (imkān) and multiplicity.
3. the third part is that which is directly related to the True One and indirectly related to the world through the addition of existence. This includes, for example, knowledge, will, power and the like, which can relate to God, in which case they are pre-existent (qadīm), or to the world, in which case they are secondarily occurring (ḥādith).

As long as this is the case, the essentially eternal existence is separated from the things produced, as al-Junayd also taught, even though they clearly state that the things produced are individuations and relations of the absolute essentially eternal existence, as well as manifestations of the names and attributes. As for the second point, namely the compatibility of the confession of the unity of existence with the Sunni rejection of the likening and emptying of God, it is known that "the truth-finders from the people of clear revelation and right tasting" (al-muḥaqqiqūn min ahl al-kashf al-ṣarīḥ wa-l-dhawq al-ṣaḥīḥ), who taught the unity of existence, adhered to the belief that appropriately combines the acquittal (tanzīh) of God from all the properties of the created beings with the confirmation of the likening attributes, this on the basis of kashf and experience, confirmed by the Qur'an and the Sunna. Because, as al-Kūrānī explains, they clearly state that God is not bound to any states of being (akwān), even if He reveals Himself in the manifestations of the names.

Ibrāhīm al-Kūrānī speaks about Wahdat al-wujūd in another passage, namely when commenting on the explanation of the author that the existence identical with God is one, but the types of its clothing (albās) are different and varied. Al-Kūrānī explains this diversity with the diversity of qualities (shuʾūn), names, realities and fixed entities, while reiterating that this diversity and variety does not affect the unity of existence (waḥdat al-wujūd) because it is one of the requirements of its essential absoluteness.

In two other writings, al-Kūrānī responded to questions from Southeast Asian Muslims who apparently interpreted Wahdat al-wujūd in a pantheistic sense. These were:

- the two-folio Mirqāt al-ṣuʿūd ilā ṣiḥḥat al-qawl bi-waḥdat al-wujūd. In this treatise, al-Kūrānī rejected an extreme notion held by some Southeast Asian Sufis who claimed that Muhammad possessed divine aspects and that this was the true meaning of wahdat al-wujūd. He contrasts this with what he believes to be the correct meaning of this doctrine. According to it, God is absolute existence in the true sense of absoluteness - that which is not limited by anything in the cosmos - and manifests itself in created forms without being limited by these forms. Al-Kūrānī responds to this idea that the doctrine of wahdat al-wujūd is correct from the point of view of religious law (šarʿan) because it is consistent with the Qur'an and the Sunnah.
- The second writing was al-Kūrānī's treatise al-Maslak al-jalī fī ḥukm shaṭḥ al-walī. In this treatise, al-Kūrānī mentions that in the year 1084 of the Hijra (= 1673/74 CE) he received a letter from Southeast Asia in which it was reported that some people there said: "God is ourselves and our existence, and we are He Himself and His existence" (inna Llāha taʿālā nafsunā wa-wujūdunā, wa-naḥnu nafsuhū wa-wujūduhū). The letter asked whether this statement could be interpreted in a figurative sense or whether it represented open disbelief. In his reply, al-Kūrānī explains that God, the absolute existence, is different from human existence and from contingent existence in general.

=== ʿAbd al-Ghanī al-Nābulusī ===
Although Ahmad Sirhindī had spoken out against Wahdat al-Wujūd at the beginning of the 17th century, some of the most prominent Naqshbandi Sufis in the Ottoman Empire also returned to this teaching in the 18th century, for example Abd al-Ghani al-Nabulusi (d. 1731) in Damascus. He wrote two treatises on this subject: Īḍāḥ al-maqṣūd min waḥdat al-wujūd ("Explanation of what is meant by the Unity of Existence") and al-Wujūd al-ḥaqq ("The Existence, the True One").

==== Īḍāḥ al-maqṣūd min waḥdat al-wujūd ====
Al-Nābulusī wrote the treatise Īḍāḥ al-maqṣūd min waḥdat al-wujūd in 1680. As he later stated in al-Wujūd al-ḥaqq, he drew for it on the knowledge of Abū Bakr, whose knowledge, according to him, was based on “the secrets of Unity of Existence" (asrār waḥdat al-wujūd). The actual intention of the treatise becomes clear right at the beginning, where the author, following the Hamdala, describes God as the one who is characterized by the unity of existence, as it is known to the people of observation (muʿāyana) and experience ( shuhūd), not according to the wrong meaning among the people of Ilḥād and Zandaqa. The treatise was directed against what it considered to be false interpretations of Wahdat al-Wujūd and aimed to determine the true meaning of this term. The wrong interpretations were, in his opinion, also the reason why this doctrine had been rejected by mentally limited and narrow-minded people. In reality, however, al-Nābulusī asserts, this teaching is in agreement with the teaching of the Sunnis.

In his treatise, al-Nābulusī contrasts the representatives of wahdat al-wujūd with other Muslims in several respects: While their sciences are based on unveiling (kashf) and observation (ʿiyān), the others derive their sciences from intellectual considerations or rational knowledge; while the beginning of their path is Taqwa and pious work, the beginning of the path of the others is the study of books; while at the end of their sciences they came to experience the ever-living (al-ḥayy al-qayyūm = God), the others at the end of their sciences attained offices and positions. Since only wahdat al-wujūd in its correct meaning is the true doctrine of faith, it is incumbent upon every obliged person (mukallaf) to search for it and to take it completely seriously. The correct wahdat al-wujūd does not contradict the teachings of the Imams of Islam.

According to al-Nābulusī, the controversy over the wahdat al-wujūd doctrine is ultimately due to the different interpretations of the word "existence" (wujūd). Whoever interprets this word precisely as the essence of existence (ʿain ḏāt al-wujūd) rejects wahdat al-wujūd because he claims a newly emerged existence (wujūd ḥādith) that coincides with the essence of the existent. His rejection of the wahdat al-wujūd doctrine is, however, a mistake, since this newly emerged existence, which he claims is a second existence alongside the existence of God, in his opinion nevertheless consists in the existence of God (qāʾim bi-wujūd Allāh), so that for him too, ultimately all existence goes back to the existence of God. On the other hand, whoever interprets existence as that through which every created being exists, accepts the wahdat al-wujūd doctrine and considers it to be true, which is the correct standpoint to which all doctrines ultimately lead.

Al-Nābulusī explains the different understandings of existence with a comparison: If one dissolves vitriol or cinnabar in water so that it changes color, then the water has a real existence and the vitriol or cinnabar only an assumed virtual existence (wujūd mafrūḍ muqaddar). One can therefore assume that these are different existences. The proponents of wahdat al-wujūd, however, meant by "existence" only that through which the existent becomes existent, not the assumed virtual existence. But ultimately even the scholars of externals (rusūm) and Kalām, who consider the assumed virtual existence as an existence in its own right, would have to admit the truth of wahdat al-wujūd, since the assumed virtual existence only exists through the existence of God. It requires a first existence. All of them thus voluntarily or inevitably taught the unity of existence.

As for the ignorant proponents of wahdat al-wujūd who claimed that their supposed virtual existence was the existence of God and also their attributes were the attributes of God in order to overthrow the Shari'ah rules, dissolve the Muhammadan community and get rid of the obligation (taklīf), it is justified to denigrate them for their false teaching, and the scholars of the outside world (ʿulamāʾ aẓ-ẓāhir) would also be rewarded by God for this denigration. However, when these scholars proceed from denigrating this vulgar mob, which deviates from religion like an arrow from its trajectory, to denigrating the ruling Imams of the Knowers of Truth, believing that the latter taught wahdat al-wujūd in a similar sense, this was reprehensible in religion and unacceptable to those who believe in God and the Last Day.

==== al-Wujūd al-ḥaqq ====
In al-Wujūd al-ḥaqq, al-Nābulusī emphasized the difference between the unity of existence and the multiplicity of existents (kathrat al-mawjūd). He wrote in it:

Even if you hear us speaking of wahdat al-wujūd, don't think that we are speaking about it according to the beliefs of the people of ignorance, stubbornness, error and ingratitude. Rather, we are making a distinction between the unity of existence and the multiplicity of existents.

—

Regarding the difference between existence and existing things, al-Nābulusī explains that the former is the origin (aṣl), while the latter follow it, emerge from it and exist in it. The meaning of "existing" (mawjūd) is a thing that has existence, not existence itself. What is being talked about is the unity of existence, not the unity of the existent. The existing is not one, but there is multiplicity in it, as the Koran says in surah 7:86 : "And remember (the times) when you were few and He made you many!"

=== Shah Waliullah Dehlawi ===
The Indian scholar Shah Waliullah Dehlawi (d. 1762) studied the doctrine of wahdat al-wujūd intensively as well. He believed that wahdat al-wujūd "according to the taste of the philosopher" (ʿalā ḏauq al-ḥakīm) differs from wahdat al-wujūd according to the opinion of others. Sadr ad-Dīn al-Qūnawī's statement on this says, according to him, "that existence is comprehensive and common to all beings, is an imagination (tamaṯṯul) of the necessary reality (al-ḥaqīqa al-wuǧūbīya) and emanates from it".

In his work at-Tafhīmāt al-ilāhīya, Shah Waliullah Dehlawi explained that the realization of the belief in existential unity (taḥqīq tauḥīd al-wujūdī) consists in "that in the external and in the thing in itself there is only one reality, namely existence, and that in the sense of self-realization (taḥaqquq) and confirmation (taqarrur), not in the original sense (lā bi-l-maʿnā al-maṣdarī)." The rest of existing things, explains Shāh Walīyallāh, rose and appeared in it, just as the forms of the waves rise in the sea or the accidents appear in their substrates. The core of their nature as existing things is that they have a connection to the reality of existence. For the Sufis who profess unity (al-ṣūfīya al-muwaḥḥida), all realities are accidents of existence. However, these realities that appear in existence are not independent things, but rather qualities and aspects of reality (shuʾūn al-wujūd wa-iʿtibārātuh) in the sense that existence, when it reveals itself, shows numerous receptivities, so that it embodies itself in one form and another in another, and is then called either human or horse.

In a letter to the Medina-based Ottoman scholar Afandī Ismāʿīl ibn ʿAbdallāh, Shah Waliullah commented on the difference between wahdat al-wujūd and wahdat al-shuhūd. The Ottoman scholar had asked him to make a comparison (taṭbīq) between the two concepts. Shah Waliullah explained in his reply that the two expressions were used in two different contexts:

1. Firstly, they were used in connection with the mystical journey to God (al-sayr ilā Llāh). Thus, it is said that a certain sālik, that is, a walker on the mystical path, is at the station (maqām) of wahdat al-wujūd, while another has reached the station of wahdat al-shuhūd. Wahdat al-wujūd here means immersing oneself in the knowledge of the unifying truth (maʿrifat al-ḥaqīqa al-jāmiʿa), in which the world becomes individualized, in such a way that all judgments of differentiation and separation (aḥkām al-tafriqa wa-l-tamāyuz), on which the knowledge of good and evil is based and on which clear statements are made about the religious law (sharʿ) and the intellect (ʿaql), are lost. Some travellers remain at this station until God releases them from it. The meaning of wahdat al-shuhūd, on the other hand, is the connection of the judgments of connection and separation (al-jamʿ wa-l-tafriqa). The walker of the mystical path then knows that things are one (wāḥida) from one aspect and many (kathīra) from another. This latter stage of the journey is more perfect and higher than the first.
2. On the other hand, the expressions are also used to describe different points of view in the knowledge of the realities of things (maʿrifat ḥaqāʾiq al-ashyāʾ) and the nature of the connection between what has come into being in time (al-ḥādith) and the pre-existent (al-qadīm). According to one group, the world consists of accidents that are combined in a single truth (aʿrāḍ mujtamiʿa fī ḥaqīqa wāḥida), just as wax can take on the form of a human being, a horse and a donkey, while the nature of the wax remains the same in all of these. Although wax is named after the forms it has assumed, these forms are in reality still representations (tamāṯīl) that only have existence through the wax. Another school, on the other hand, sees the world as reflections of the divine names and attributes (ʿukūs al-asmāʾ wa-l-ṣifāt), which are reflected in the mirrors of the non-existences (al-aʿdām al-mutaqābila) that face them. For example, when the light of divine power (qudra) is reflected in the mirror of its non-existence, namely powerlessness (ʿajz), it becomes contingent power (qudra mumkina). The same applies analogously to other attributes and also to existence itself. The school of thought of the first group is called wahdat al-wujūd and that of the second wahdat asch-shuhūd.

In contrast to Ahmad al-Sirhindī, who had distinguished between wahdat al-wujūd as a metaphysical teaching and wahdat ash-shuhūd as a mystical experience, Shah Waliullah believed that both concepts have a mystical and a metaphysical quality.

The starting point for Shah Waliullah's preoccupation with the topic was a dream he had in 1731 during his stay in the Hijaz and describes in his work Fuyūḍ al-Ḥaramayn. In it, he saw a crowd of people. Half of them were engaged in Dhikr and Yād-Dāsht ("concentration on God"). Lights appeared on their hearts and freshness and beauty on their faces, and they did not believe in wahdat al-wujūd. The other half believed in wahdat al-wujūd and were busy contemplating the divine permeation of existence (sarayān al-wujūd). Their hearts showed shame and despondency in the view of God, who is busy controlling the world in general and souls in particular. Their faces looked desiccated. The two groups argued, each claiming that their way (ṭarīqa) was better than the other. When they could not resolve their dispute, they turned to Shah Waliullah to seek his judgment. In a long speech, he stated that wahdat al-wujūd was a true teaching, but those who believed in it were so absorbed in thinking about the immanence of God in the world that they lost the worship of God, the love of God and the transcendence of God.

=== Ismāʿīl al-Gelenbevī ===
On the grounds that the doctrine of Wahdat al-Wujūd had become known among prominent scholars and was one of the dangerous places where feet slipped (mazāliq al-aqdām), the Ottoman theologian and mathematician Ismāʿīl ibn Mustafā al-Gelenbevī (d. 1791), who was active in Istanbul, wrote a treatise on this topic too. In it he based his work on the distinction already made by Ibn Sabʿīn and al-Qāshānī between the necessarily existent, i.e. God, and the contingently existent, which means everything that is not divine. In his treatise, al-Gelenbevī first makes it clear that he considers the view of wahdat al-wujūd popular among a group of Sufis, according to which the necessary is "the sum of the parts of the world" (majmūʿ ajzāʾ al-ʿālam), to be blatant disbelief (kufr ṣarīḥ). In order to explain what he considered to be the correct philosophical doctrine of wahdat al-wujūd, he draws the following analogy:

If we stretch many threads from the top of a pole from all its sides so that they completely cover it and then place the pole on the ground, the threads all look as erected as the pole. In reality, however, what is erected is only the pole, while the erections of the threads are only imaginary and imagined. For they are erected only by the erection of the pole, not by their own erections. The true erection is only one, but what is erected is many, because it (sc. the erection) extends to them (sc. the threads) and appears in them. As long as each thread is hanging on the pole, the erection appears in it. And as soon as this suspension is interrupted, the imaginary erection disappears and no longer exists. If you replace the erection of the pole with the true existence, the erected threads with the imaginary and imagined existences of contingent things, and the forms (hayākil) and fixed entities (aʿyān thābita) that are the manifestations in place of those threads, then you have formed an image of the doctrine of wahdat al-wujūd as held by the true scholars, without needing to add anything.

—

With this simile, al-Gelenbevī wanted to make it clear that contingent things have no existence of their own apart from the necessary existence, but exist solely through the existence of the necessary, i.e. God. The obvious existence of every contingent existent is the existence of the necessary, not another independent existence. Rather, the other independent existence is as imaginary and a product of the imagination as the uprightness of the threads or as mirror images. According to al-Gelenbevī, the counterparts of those who teach the unity of existence are those who teach the multiplicity of existence (kathrat al-wujūd). They attribute to each contingent existent an existence of its own, which is not connected to the existence of the necessarily existent.

According to al-Gelenbewī, what the proponents of wahdat al-wujūd teach inevitably means that all effects and actions that appear to emanate from the non-necessary actually emanate from God. What has confused the rational people, however, is the fact that the totality of these effects and actions also includes that which is disgraceful (qabīḥ) according to the Sharia and reason. Many scholars have therefore accused Muhyī l-Dīn Ibn ʿArabī, Sadr al-Dīn al-Qūnawī and other great "representatives of unity" (ahl al-waḥda) of unbelief. But there is no reason to declare them unbelievers because it is also Sunni teaching that there is compulsion in people's actions and what appears to be shameful does not come about through the voluntary choice (ikhtiyār) of people, but is predetermined from all eternity (azalī).

== Wahdat al-wujūd as the true meaning of the formula Lā ilāh illā Llāh ==
=== Lā ilāh illā Llāh as a means of contemplating the unity of existence ===
Fadlallāh al-Burhānpūrī also expressed the view in his treatise at-Tuḥfa al-mursala that Wahdat al-wujūd is the "real meaning" (ʿain maʿnā) of the "Good Word" (al-kalima aṭ-ṭaiyiba), i.e. the formula Lā ilāha illā Llāh, which forms the first part of the Islamic creed. His commentator Abd al-Ghani al-Nabulsi (d. 1731) agreed with him and justified the correctness of this position with the argument that the formula Lā ilāha illā Llāh means: "There is nothing that can dispense with everything else and that everything else cannot dispense with, except God." Since this statement also applies to the one true existence that does not need the forms and individuations of the world, while all worlds need them, one can say that the meaning of Wahdat al-wudschūd is identical with the meaning of the "Good Word". be.

Al-Burhānpūrī also considered the formula Lā ilāha illā Llāh as a means of contemplation (murāqaba) on the unity of existence and thus as a means of reaching God. He recommended that seekers of God repeat this formula constantly and not pay attention to breathing or pronunciation, but concentrate entirely on the meaning of the formula. One can perform this exercise without Wudu. However, if it is present, it is better. His commentator ِAbū l-Chair as-Suwaidī (d. 1786) adds at this point that seekers of God should continue this Dhikr until it passes from the tongue to the heart. In this way, the revelations of the attributes and names of God would come to him, for God said: "I am the companion of the one who mentions me" (anā ǧalīs man ḏakaranī). The companion must, however, be something experienced. The dhikr performed in this way, al-Suwaidī concludes, is better than raiding and martyrdom for the cause of God, because the former are rewarded with the Garden of Paradise, while the dhikr is rewarded with the experience and vision of Gods, which is better than the attainment of Paradise.

=== The theses of ʿAbd ar-Rahmān al-Lakhnawī ===
Wahdat al-wujud being the true meaning of the formula Lā ilāha illā Llāh was also the central idea of the treatise Kalimat al-ḥaqq by the Indian Sufi author ʿAbd ar-Rahmān al-Lakhnawī (d. 1830) Based on this view, he also believed that the affirmation of Wahdat al-wujud was obligatory for all Muslims. According to him, the formula Lā ilāh illā Llāh actually means Lā mawjūda illā Llāh (“There is nothing that exists except God”). Anyone who does not believe in this meaning of the formula Lā ilāha illā Llāh is not a true believer. The great scholars of the East and West of the earlier and later generations, the hadith scholars as well as the Qur'an exegetes, Kalām scholars and Fiqh scholars, the Mujtahidūn as well as the Muqallidūn have unfortunately distorted the true meaning of the formula Lā ilāha illā Llāh. This error and this falsification then spread among the Muslims until in their belief system Tawhid became Shirk and Shirk became Tawhid. After God enlightened him through inspiration about the true meaning of the creed, he set to work and wrote the text Kalimat al-ḥaqq.

ʿAbd ar-Rahmān al-Lakhnawī based his view on linguistic and historical arguments. For example, he believed that the word illā in the creed was not an exceptional particle, but had the meaning of "other than", so that it made sense: "No god is other than God". Another argument of his was based on the morphology of the Arabic creed Lā ilāha illā Llāh: Since three of the four words, namely lā, ilāha and illā, are contained in the fourth word (A)llāh, this shows that nothing else exists besides God. Furthermore, al-Lakhnawī believed that Wahdat al-wujūd must be the real meaning of the Islamic creed because otherwise there would have been no difference between the Muslims and the Mushrikun, whom Muhammad called to this creed under threat of violence. Even the pre-Islamic Arabs had already believed in the existence and unity of God and that he had created the world, as can be seen from Sura 23:86f and 43:9. They only viewed the idols as intercessors with God and only worshipped them so that they would bring them into a close relationship with God, as can be seen from Sura 10:18 and 39:3. What Muhammad objected to among the Mushrikun was the assertion of the difference between God on the one hand and the gods and other things on the other. To refute this, the formula Lā ilāha illā Llāh was revealed. It means: "Everything that you imagine to be other than God is nothing other than Him, but He Himself." Therefore, the truth of the creed formula Lā ilāh illā Llāh depends on the affirmation of the unity of existence and the rejection of plurality.

ʿAbd ar-Rahmān al-Lakhnawī went further in his interpretation of Wahdat al-wujūd than any other scholar. For example, he believed, unlike al-Mahā'imi (see above), that God does not reveal himself in the totality of existences, but that every existing thing is God and that there is no difference between one existing thing and another. He explained the difference that people perceive between things as something that does not exist externally, but only in the imagination (wahm) and in the mind (iʿtibār). In his opinion, this subjectively perceived difference between one another (at-taġāyur al-iʿtibārī) does not contradict the unity of existence.

Various scholars declared al-Lakhnawī an unbeliever because of his teachings or wrote refutations of his writings. The Sufi Mehr ʿAlī Shāh (d. 1937), who worked in Punjab, criticized al-Lakhnawī's theses in his Persian book Taḥqīq al-ḥaqq fī Kalimat al-ḥaqq, which was first published in 1897, and tried to refute them with his own arguments. He was of the opinion that al-Lakhnawī had not fundamentally deviated from the mystical tradition with his teaching of Wahdat al-wujūd, but with the fact that he applied it to the meaning of the Islamic creed formula lā ilāha illā Llāh and wanted to make belief in this meaning obligatory for the entire Umma.

== Literature ==
Sources (in chronological order)

- Ibn Sabʿīn (d.. 1270): Rasāʾil. Ed. ʿAbd ar-Raḥmān Badawī. Kairo 1965. Digitalisat
- Sadr al-Din al-Qunawi (d. 1274): Miftāḥ ghayb al-jamʿ wa-l-wujūd. Ed. ʿĀṣim Ibrāhīm al-Kaiyālī. Dār al-kutub al-ʿilmīya, Beirut 2010. Digitalisat
- ʿAzīz ad-Dīn Nasafī: Kashf al-ḥaqāʾiq. Ed. A. Mahdawī Dāmġānī. Teheran 1965.
- Saʿīd al-Dīn al-Farghānī (fl. 1300): Mašāriq ad-darārī šarḥ Tāʾīya-yi Ibn-i Fāriḍ. Ed. Ǧalāl ad-Dīn Āštiyānī. Maschhad 1398h (= 1977 n. Chr.).
- Ibn Taimiyya (d. 1329): Ibṭāl waḥdat al-wuǧūd wa-radd ʿalā l-qāʾilīn bi-hā in Maǧmūʿat ar-rasāʾil wa-l-masāʾil. Dār al-kutub al-ʿilmīya, Beirut 1983. Bd. I, S. 75–85. Wikisource-Version
- Niẓām al-Dīn Yamanī (fl. um 1400): Laṭāʾif-i Ašrafī fī bayān ṭawāʾif-i ṣūfī. 2. Aufl. Maktaba-yi Simnānī, Karachi 1999. S. 129–150. Digitalisat
- ʿAlāʾ al-Dīn al-Bukhārī (d. 1437): Fāḍiḥat al-mulḥidīn wa-nāṣiḥat al-muwaḥḥidīn. Ed. Muḥammad ibn Ibrāhīm al-ʿIwaḍī. Mekka 1414h (= 1993 n. Chr.). Digitalisat – The book was printed the first time as Risāla fī waḥdat al-wujūd. In Majmūʿat rasāʾil fī waḥdat al-wujūd. Istanbul 1877, S. 2–47. (Digitalisat) and was attributed to al-Bukhārī's teacher al-Taftazani (d. 1390).
- Ali al-Qari (d. 1606): Risāla fī Waḥdat al-wujūd. In Maǧmūʿat rasāʾil fī waḥdat al-wuǧūd. Istanbul 1877, S. 52–114. Digitalisat
- Faḍlallāh al-Burhānpūrī (d. 1619): al-Tuḥfa al-mursala ilā l-Nabī. Ediert und ins Englische übersetzt von A.H. Johns in The Gift Addressed to the Spirit of the Prophet. The Australian National University, Canberra 1965. S. 126–148.
- Ahmad Sirhindi (d. 1624): Maktūbāt. Karachi without date (Reprint Hakikat Kitabevi, Istanbul 1977). Digitalisat Bd. I, Digitalisat Bd. II. – Arabic translation by Muḥammad Murād al-Munzāwī: ad-Durar al-maknūnāt an-nafīsa fī taʿrīb al-maktūbāt aš-šarīfa. Ohne Ort und Datum. Digitalisat Bd. I, Digitalisat Bd. II
- Muḥammad Ṭāhir al-Qummī (d. 1689): Ḥikmat al-ʿārifin. Ed. Ata Anzali und S.M. Hadi Gerami in Opposition to Philosophy in Safavid Iran. Brill, Leiden 2018. S. 295–414.
- Ibrāhīm al-Kūrānī (d. 1690): Itḥāf aḏ-ḏakī fī šarḥ at-Tuḥfa al-mursala ilā n-Nabī Ed. Oman Fathurrahman unter dem Titel Ithaf Al-Dhaki: Tafsir Wahdatul Wujud bagi Muslim Nusantara. EFEO, Jakarta 2012.
- Abd al-Ghani al-Nabulusi (d. 1731): Īḍāḥ al-maqṣūd min waḥdat al-wuǧūd. Ed. ʿIzza Ḥaṣrīya. Maṭbaʿat al-ʿilm, Damaskus 1969. Digitalisat
- ʿAbd al-Ġanī an-Nābulusī: al-Wuǧūd al-ḥaqq. Ed. Bakri Aladdin. Institut Français de Damas, Damaskus 1995.
- ʿAbd al-Ġanī an-Nābulusī: al-Qaul al-matīn fi bayān tauḥīd al-ʿārifīn wa-huwa al-musammā Nuḫbat al-masʾala: wa-huwa šarḥ risalat al-Tuḥfa al-mursala. Ed. ʿAlī Abū n-Nūr al-Ǧarbī. Maṭbaʿat aš-Šarq, Kairo 1926. Digitalisat
- Shāh Walī Allāh ad-Dihlawī (d. 1762): at-Tafhīmāt al-ilāhīya. 2 Bde. Madinat Press, Surat 1936. Digitalisat
- Abū l-Khayr as-Suwaydī (d. 1786): Kashf al-ḥujūb al-musbala sharḥ al-Tuḥfa al-mursala. Maṭbaʿat an-Nīl, Kairo ca. 1920. Digitalisat
- Ismāʿīl ibn Muṣṭafā al-Gelenbewī (d. 1791): Risāla fī waḥdat al-wuǧūd. Ed. Rifat Okudan. Fakülte Kitabevi, Isparta 2007.
- ʿAbd al-Raḥmān al-Lakhnawī (d. 1830): Kalimat al-ḥaqq. Ediert und kommentiert von Maulawī Nūrallāh. Maṭbaʿ-i Munšiʾ, Lucknow 1908. Digitalisat
- İsmail Fenni (d. 1946): Vahdet-i vücut ve Muhyiddin-i Arabı̂. Orhaniye Matbaası, Istanbul 1928. Digitalisat
- ʿAbd al-Ḥalīm Maḥmūd (d. 1978): Qaḍīyat at-taṣauwuf: al-madrasa aš-Šāḏilīya. 3. Aufl. Dār al-Maʿārif, Kairo 1999. S. 248–258. Digitalisat

Secondary Literature

- Bakri Aladdin “ʿʿAbd al-Ghanī al-Nābulusī’, the Doctrine of the Unity of Being and the Beginnings of the Arab Renaissance,” in Lejla Demiri und Samuela Pagani (Hrsg.): Early Modern Trends in Islamic Theology: ʿAbd al-Ghanī al-Nābulusī and His Network of Scholarship. Mohr Siebeck, Tübingen 2019. S. 31–48.
- Bakri Aladdin: “Oneness of Being (waḥdat al-wujud): The term and the doctrine”, in Journal of the Muhyiddin Ibn Arabi Society 51 (2012), 3–26. Online-Version
- S. A. Ali: „The Medinian Letter. An inquiry into waḥdat al-wujūd and waḥdat al-shuhūd and their reconciliation, by Shāh Walīallāh“ in Recherches d'islamologie: Recueil d'articles offert à Georges C. Anawati et Louis Gardet par leurs collègues et amis. Peeters, Louvain, 1977. S. 1–20.
- Abdul Haq Ansari: “Shah Waliy Allah attempts to revise waḥdat al-wujūd” in Arabica 35 (1988) 197–213.
- Abdul Haq Ansari: “Shaykh Aḥmad Sirhindī’s doctrine of ‘Waḥdat al-shuhūd’.” in Islamic Studies 37/3 (1998) 281–313. Hier S. 290–294.
- Abdul Haq Ansari: “Ibn ʿArabī: The doctrine of Waḥdat al-Wujūd” in Islamic Studies 38/2 (1999) 149-192.
- William C. Chittick: “Waḥdat al-wujūd in Islamic Thought” in Bulletin of the Henry Martyn Institute of Islamic Studies 10 (1991) 7–27. – Auch veröffentlicht unter dem Titel “A History of the Term Waḥdat al-Wujūd” in W. C. Chittick: In Search of the Lost Heart, Explorations in Islamic Thought. State University of New York Press, Albany, N.Y. 2012. S. 71–88.
- Vincent J. Cornell: “The All-Comprehensive Circle (al-Iḥāṭa): Soul, Intellect, and the Oneness of Existence in the Doctrine of Ibn Sab‘īn” in Ayman Shihadeh (ed.): Sufism and Theology. Edinburgh University Press, Edinburgh 2007. S. 31–48.
- Thomas W. Dahnhardt: “The Doctrine of the Unicity of Existence in the Light of an Eighteenth Century Indian Sūfī Treatise: The "Waḥdat al-Wuǧūd" by "Baḥr al-ʿulūm" ʿAbd al-ʿAlī Anṣārī al-Lakhnawī” in Oriente Moderno 92/2 (2012) 323–60.
- Ekrem Demirli: “Vahdet-i Vücûd” in Türkiye Diyanet Vakfı İslâm Ansiklopedisi Bd. XLII, S. 431–435. Online-Version mit Digitalisat
- Naser Dumairieh: Intellectual Life in the Ḥijāz before Wahhabism. Ibrāhīm al-Kūrānī’s (d. 1101/1690) Theology of Sufism. Brill, Leiden 2021. S. 260–268.
- Khaled El-Rouayheb: Islamic Intellectual History in the Seventeenth Century: Scholarly Currents in the Ottoman Empire and the Maghreb. Cambridge University Press, Cambridge 2015. S. 312–346.
- Muhammad U. Faruque: “Sufism contra Shariah? Shāh Walī Allāh’s Metaphysics of Waḥdat al-Wujūd” in Journal of Sufi Studies 5/1 (2016) 27-57. https://doi.org/10.1163/22105956-12341282
- Souad Hakim: “Unity of being in Ibn ʿArabī – A Humanist Perspective.” in Journal of the Muhyiddin Ibn ʿArabi Society 36 (2004) 15–37.
- Toshihiko Izutsu: Unicité de l'existence et création perpétuelle en mystique islamique. Les Deux Océans, Paris 1980.
- Alexander Knysh: “Ibrāhīm al-Kūrānī (d. 1101/1690), an apologist for waḥdat al-wujūd” in Journal of the Royal Asiatic Society 5/1 (1995) 39–47.
- Alexander Knysh: “Waḥdat al-Wujūd” in John L. Esposito: The Oxford Encyclopedia of Islam and the Muslim World Oxford University Press, New York 2009. Bd. V, S. 510–511.
- Hermann Landolt: „Simnānī on Wahdat al-Wujud,“ in Collected Papers on Islamic Philosophy and Mysticism, hrsg. von Mehdi Mohaghegh and Hermann Landolt. Institute of Islamic Studies, Teheran 1971. S. 91–112.
- Hermann Landolt: „Der Briefwechsel zwischen Kāšānī und Simnānī über Waḥdat al-Wuǧūd“ in Der Islam 50 (1973) 29–81.
- Muhammad Bukhari Lubis: The ocean of unity: Waḥdat al-Wujūd in Persian, Turkish and Malay poetry. Dewan Bahasa dan Pustaka, Kuala Lumpur 1994.
- Heike Stamer: “Saʿīd al-Dīn al-Farghānī’s Usage of the Term waḥdat al-wujūd and His Role in Ibn ʿArabī’s School” in Journal of the Muhyiddin Ibn 'Arabi Society 56 (2014) 43–66. Digitalisat
- Tahir Hameed Tanoli: “A Forgotten Debate on Wahdat al-wujud in Contemporary Perspective” in Heike Stamer (Hrsg.): Mysticism in East and West, the concept of the unity of being. Proceedings of the First Loyola Hall Symposium, held on 20-21 february 2013 in Lahore, Pakistan. Multimedia Affairs, Lahore 2013. S. 202–217.
- Adam Tyson: The Debate Over Mystical Monism in the 17th Century: The 'Unity of Existence' and Non-Muslims in the Ottoman and Mughal Empires. PhD Dissertation University of California, Riverside 2024. Digitalisat
- Alberto Ventura: “Un trattato di ʿAbd al-Ġanī an-Nābulusī sull' «Unicità dell'Esistenza».” in Rivista Degli Studi Orientali 53/1–2 (1979) 119–39.
- Alberto Ventura: “A letter of Šayḫ Aḥmad Sirhindī in defense of ‘waḥdat al-wuǧūd.’” in Oriente Moderno 92/2 (2012) 509–17.
