= Akbarism =

Branch of Sufi metaphysics linked to Ibn Arabi

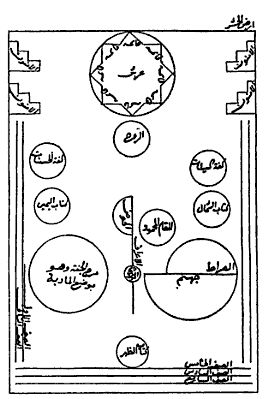
Diagram of "Plain of Assembly" (Ard al-Hashr) on the Day of Judgment, from autograph manuscript of Futuhat al-Makkiyya, ca. 1238 (photo: after Futuhat al-Makkiyya, Cairo edition, 1911)

Akbari Sufism or Akbarism or Akbarianism (Arabic: أكبرية, romanized: Akbariyya) is a branch of Sufi metaphysics based on the teachings of Ibn Arabi, an Andalusian Sufi who was a mystic and philosopher. The word is derived from Ibn Arabi's nickname, "Shaykh al-Akbar," meaning "the greatest master." "Akbariyya" and "Akbaris" have never been used to indicate a specific Sufi group or society. It is now used to refer to all historical or contemporary Sufi metaphysicians and Sufis influenced by Ibn Arabi's doctrine of wahdat al-wujūd. It is not to be confused with Al Akbariyya, a secret Sufi society founded by Swedish Sufi 'Abdu l-Hadi Aguéli.

== Wahdat al-Wujud ==
Wahdat al-wujud (وحدة الوجود; Persian: وحدت وجود), meaning "unity of being", is a Sufi philosophy emphasizing that "there is no true existence except the Ultimate Truth (God)"—that is, that the only truth within the universe is God, and that all things exist within God only.

Ibn Arabi is most often characterized in Islamic texts as the originator of this doctrine. However, it is not found in his works. The first to employ this term was Ibn Sabin. Ibn Arabi's disciple and stepson, Sadr al-Din al-Qunawi, used this term in his own works and explained it in philosophical terms.

== Academic study ==
=== Europe and United States ===
In the 20th century, the Akbari School was a focus in academic circles and universities. Viewed in a historical context, increased government support for the study of the Muslim world and Islamic languages emerged in the United States after the Second World War, when many students were attracted to Islam and religious studies during the 1970s.

The greatest growth in American scholarship on Sufism took place during the 1970s. Alexander Knysh notes that, "In the decades after World War Two, the majority of Western experts in Sufism were no longer based in Europe, but in North America." Henri Corbin (d. 1978) and Fritz Meier (d. 1998), who were prominent among these experts, made important contributions to the study of Islamic mysticism. Other important names were Miguel Asín Palacios (d. 1944) and Louis Massignon (d. 1962), both of whom made contributions to Ibn Arabi studies. Palacios discovered some Akbarian elements in Dante's Divine Comedy. Massignon studied the famous Sufi Al-Hallaj, who said: "Ana l-Haq" ("I am the Truth").

Seyyed Hossein Nasr and his students and academic disciples have come to play an important role in certain subfields of Sufi studies. The influence of Nasr and other traditionalist writers like Rene Guenon and Frithjof Schuon on Sufi studies can be seen in the interpretation of the works of Ibn Arabi and the Akbari school by such scholars as Titus Burckhardt, Martin Lings, James W. Morris, William Chittick, Sachiko Murata, and others. These names are both mostly practitioners of Sufism and scholars studying Sufism.

=== Turkey ===
Turkey is where Ibn Arabi's most prominent disciple, successor, and stepson Sadr al-Din al-Qunawi, and other important commentators on Arabi's works, lived. Dawūd al-Qayṣarī, who was invited to Iznik by Orhan Ghazi to serve as the director and teacher of the first Ottoman university (madrasa), was a disciple of Kamāl al-Dīn al-Qāshānī, himself a disciple of Sadr al-Dīn al-Qūnawī. This means that the official teaching itself was initiated by a great master of the Akbari school. Not only Sufis but also Ottoman sultans, politicians and intellectuals had been deeply impressed by Ibn Arabi and his disciples and interpreters. Seyyed Muhammad Nur al-Arabi was also impressed by Ibn Arabi's doctrine, though that continued to decrease until the modern era. In the 20th century, the last important commentator on Fuṣūṣ al-ḥikam was Ahmed Avni Konuk (d. 1938). He was a mawlawî and composer of Turkish music.

Studies on Sufism, especially Akbari works, were not common before Mahmud Erol Kılıc of Marmara University published his 1995 dissertation titled "Ibn 'Arabi's Ontology" (in Turkish, Muhyiddin İbn Arabi'de Varlık ve Varlık Mertebeleri). Academic studies on Akbari metaphysics and philosophy began to increase after Turkish scholars such as Mustafa Tahralı and Kılıc researched the topic.

In terms of Akbari studies, the most important event was the translation of Ibn Arabi's magnum opus, Futuhat-ı Makkiyya, into Turkish. Turkish scholar Ekrem Demirli translated the work in 18 volumes between 2006 and 2012. Demirli's work also includes translating Sadr al-Din al-Qunawi's corpus into Turkish, writing a PhD thesis on him in 2004, writing a commentary on Fusus al-Hikam by Ibn Arabi, and writing a book titled İslam Metafiziğinde Tanrı ve İnsan (God and Human in Islamic Metaphysics). Many Akbari works in Ottoman Turkish are yet to be studied by scholars.

== List of some Akbaris ==
There have been many Akbari Sufis, metaphysicians and philosophers. While Ibn Arabi never founded a Tarikah himself, he created a majority of the philosophy around it with his Wahdat al-Wujud. The Sufis listed below were members of different orders, but following the concept of Wahdat al-Wujud.

1. Sadr al-Din al-Qunawi (d. 1274) - student and stepson of Ibn ‘Arabī. Lived in Konya the same time as Mawlānā Jalāl-ad-Dīn Rumi
2. Fakhr al-Din Iraqi (1213–1289)
3. Sa'id al-Din Farghani (d. 1300)
4. Mahmud Shabistari (1288–1340)
5. Dawūd al-Qayṣarī (d. 1351)
6. Ḥaydar Āmūlī (d. 1385)
7. Abd-al-karim Jili (d. 1428)
8. Mulla Shams ad-Din al-Fanari (1350–1431)
9. Shah Ni'matullah Wali (1330–1431)
10. Abdurrahman Jami (1414–1492)
11. Idris Bitlisi (d. 1520)
12. ʿAbd al-Wahhāb ibn Aḥmad al-Shaʿrānī(1493–1565)
13. Mulla Sadra (1571–1641)
14. Abd al-Ghani al-Nabulsi (1641–1731)
15. Ismail Hakki Bursevi (1652–1725)
16. Ahmad ibn Ajiba (1747–1809)
17. Abd al-Qadir al-Jaza'iri (1808–1883)
18. Ahmad al-Alawi (1869–1934)
19. Abd al-Wahid Yahya (René Guénon) (1886–1951)
20. Mustafa 'Abd al-'Aziz (1911–1974)
21. Abdel-Halim Mahmoud (1910–1978)
22. Javad Nurbakhsh (1926–2008)
