= Abd al-Karim al-Jili =

Muslim Sufi saint and mystic

Shaykh al-Islām ʿAbd al-Karīm al-Jīlī
- عبد الكريم الجيلي

Personal life
- Born: 1365 AD Baghdad, Abbasid Caliphate (now Baghdad, Iraq)
- Died: 1424 AD Salihiyya, Damascus, Ayyubid Sultanate
- Era: Medieval philosophy: 14th century philosophy; 15th century philosophy
- Region: Middle Eastern philosophy: Islamic philosophy
- Main interests: Sufism; Tafsir; Epistemology; Ontology; Poetry; Fiqh
- Notable work: al-Insān al-Kāmil
- Occupation: Mufassir, Muhaddtih, Theologian, Philosopher, Academic, Poet

Religious life
- Religion: Islam
- Denomination: Sunni
- Jurisprudence: Hanbali
- Creed: Athari

Muslim leader
- Influenced by: Abdul Qadir Gilani, Sharaf al-Dīn Ismā'il al-Jabartī, Ibn Arabi, Mu'ayyid al-Dīn al-Jandī, ‘Abd al-Razzāq al-Kāshānī, Sadr al-Din al-Qunawi, Dawūd al-Qayṣarī, al-Busiri, Fakhr-al-Din Iraqi, Fakhr al-Din al-Razi, Qadi Baydawi, 'Adud al-Din al-'Iji, Ibn Hajar al-Asqalani, Fairuzabadi
- Influenced: Muhammad Iqbal, Virtually all of Sufism
- Arabic name
- Personal (Ism): ʿAbd al-Karīm محمد
- Toponymic (Nisba): al-Jīlī

ʿAbd al-Karīm al-Jīlī, or Abdul Karim Jili (Arabic:عبد الكريم الجيلي) was a Muslim Sufi saint and mystic who was born in 1365, in what is modern day Iraq, possibly in the neighborhood of Jil in Baghdad. He is known in Muslim mysticism (Sufism) as the author of Universal Man.

Jili was a descendant of the Sufi saint Abdul Qadir Gilani, the founder of the Qadiriyya dervish order. Although little is known about his life, historians have noted that Jili travelled in various places around the world. He wrote more than twenty books, of which Universal Man is the best known.

Jili was the foremost systematizer and one of the greatest exponents of the work of Ibn Arabi. Universal Man is an explanation of Ibn Arabi's teachings on the structure of reality and human perfection. Since it was written, it has been held up as one of the masterpieces of Sufi literature. Jili conceived of the Absolute Being as a Self, a line of thinking which later influenced the 20th century Muslim philosopher and poet Muhammad Iqbal.

== See also ==
- Al Akbariyya (Sufi school)
