= Naw'i Efendi =

16th-Century Ottoman Islamic Scholar

Personal life
- Era: 15th-century

Religious life
- Religion: Islam
- Sect: Sunni
- Jurisprudence: Hanafi
- Creed: Maturidi
- Movement: Akbari

Yahya b. Ali b. Nasuh al-Rumi (1533-1599), known more famously as Naw'i Efendi, was a prominent Sunni Hanafi-Maturidi jurist, theologian, and poet in the Ottoman Empire. He was a tutor for the children of Sultan Murad III. He is considered one of the most important Ottoman poets of his century and was given the title "the scholar of his century".

== Theology ==
Naw'i Efendi was a scholar in the tradition of Akbari Sufi tradition, and wrote Akbari theological works. He also wrote an encyclopedia of Islamic figures. His other writings included an epistle listing the differences between the Ash'ari and Maturidi schools of Islamic creed.

== Works ==
- Tercüme-i Hadîs-i Erbaîn
- Hasb-i Hal
- Keşfü'l-hicâb min vechi'l-kitâb
- Netâyicü'l-fünûn ve mehâsinü'l-mutûn
- Nevâ-yı Uşşâk
- Faslun fî virtueti'l-işk
- Fezâilü'l-vüzerâ and hasâilü'l-ümerâ
- Risâle-i Şikâyet-i Rûzigâr
- Tercüme-i Münşeât-ı Hâce-i Cihân
- Gul-i Sad-berg
