= Mulhid =

Islamic religious term meaning apostate, heretic, or atheist

Mulhid (ملحد plural ملحدون mulḥidun and ملاحدۃ malāḥidah) is an Islamic religious term meaning apostate, atheist, infidel or heretic. In pre-Islamic times the term was used in the literal sense of the root l-ḥ-d: "incline, deviate". Its religious meaning is based on the Quranic verses 7:180, 22:25, and 41:40. Under the Umayyad Caliphate it denoted desertion of the ummah and rebellion against legitimate caliphs. Early in the Abbasid era rationalistic theologians began using it in the sense of "heretic", and it eventually came to refer to rejection of religion as such, to materialistic scepticism and atheism. In Ottoman usage the term was commonly used in reference to Shia and certain Sufi doctrines that were considered to be subversive.

== See also ==
- Irreligion
- Zindiq
