= Sa'id al-Din Farghani =

Persian Sufi mystic and scholar (1231 – 1300)

- Born: 1231; Kashan, Farghana Valley, Chagatai Khanate
- Died: 1300; Damascus, Syria, Mamluk Sultanate
- Notable works: Mashariq al-Darari; Muntaha al-Madarik; Manahij al-Ibad

Sa'id al-Din Farghani (Persian: سعیدالدین فرقانی; 1231 – 1300) was a Persian Sufi mystic and scholar, who is known to have composed three works.

Farghani was born in 1231 in Kashan, a town located in the Farghana Valley. Although the valley was nominally part of the Mongol Chagatai Khanate, it was governed by a representative of the Mongol Empire from 1227 to 1238.

Farghani became acquainted with Sufism through Najib al-Din Buzghush (died 1279), a member of the Suhrawardiyya and a student of Shibab al-Din Suhrawardi (died 1191). Farghani later moved to the city of Konya in Anatolia, where he studied under Sadr al-Din al-Qunawi (died 1274), the most prominent disciple of the Andalusian scholar and mystic Ibn Arabi (died 1240). During this period, Konya reportedly served as a gathering place for students who wanted to increase their knowledge in Sufism. Through Qunawi, Farghani became acquainted with Ibn Arabi's ʿulum al-haqiqa ("Mystical theosophy").

In 1247, Qunawi took his students (including Farghani) to Egypt, where he taught them the poem Nazm al-suluk ("Poem of the Sufi way"), also known as al-Taʾiyya al-kubra ("The greater ode with rhyming verse based upon the letter taʾ"), by the Egyptian Sufi poet Ibn al-Farid (died 1234).

Farghani died in August 1300 in the city of Damascus.

== Sources ==
- Bosworth, C. Edmund (1999). "Farḡāna". Encyclopaedia Iranica.
- Chittick, William C. (1999). "Farḡānī, Saʿīd-al-Dīn Mohammad". Encyclopaedia Iranica.
- Hussain, Ali (2016). "al-Farghānī, Saʿīd al-Dīn". In Fleet, Kate; Krämer, Gudrun; Matringe, Denis; Nawas, John; Rowson, Everett (eds.). Encyclopaedia of Islam (3rd ed.). Brill Online. ISSN 1873-9830.
- Peacock, A. C. S. (2019). Islam, Literature and Society in Mongol Anatolia. Cambridge University Press. ISBN 978-1108499361.
- Sheikhsofla, Ensiyeh (2018). "al-Farghānī". In Madelung, Wilferd; Daftary, Farhad (eds.). Encyclopaedia Islamica Online. Brill Online. ISSN 1875-9831.
