= Dawūd al-Qayṣarī =

Ottoman Sufi scholar, philosopher and mystic (c.1260-c.1350)

Personal life
- Born: c. 1260 Kayseri
- Died: 751/1350
- Era: 14th century
- Notable work: Sharh Fusus al-Hikam
- Occupation: Theologian, Teacher at the first Ottoman medrese

Religious life
- Religion: Islam
- Tariqa: Akbariyya

Muslim leader
- Influenced by: Ibn Arabi, Qunawi
- Influenced: Molla Fenari

Dawūd al-Qayṣarī (c. 1260 – c. 1350) was an early Ottoman Sufi scholar, philosopher and mystic. He was born in Kayseri, in central Anatolia and was the student of the Iranian scholar, Abd al-Razzaq Kāshānī (d. 1329).

He was the author of over a dozen philosophical texts, many of which are still important textbooks in Shi'ite religious schools. The most important is the commentary on Ibn al-'Arabi's Fusus al-Hikam and his criticism of Ibn al-Farid's critics. Sultan Orhan Gazi built a school for him in the town of İznik, the first case of an Ottoman state-established medrese.

== See also ==
- Akbariyya
