= Fakhr al-Din Iraqi =

Persian philosopher and writer (1213/14 – 1289)

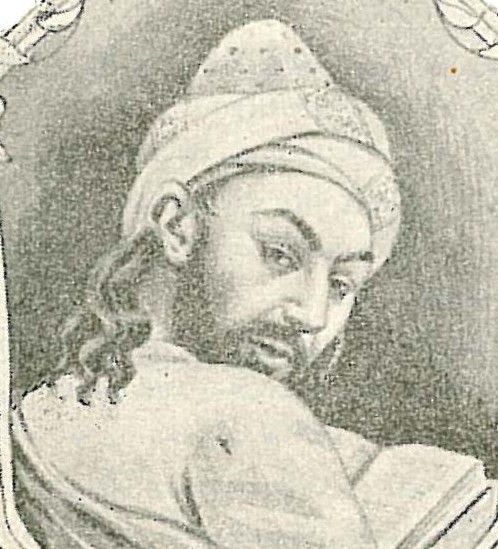
- Drawing of Fakhr al-Din Iraqi by Abbas Rassam Arjangi
- Born: 1213/14; Komjan, Khwarazmian Empire
- Died: 1289 (aged 78); Damascus, Mamluk Sultanate
- Writing career
- Notable works: Lama'at; Divan of Fakhr al-Din Iraqi

Fakhr al-Din Iraqi (also spelled Araqi; Persian: فخرالدین عراقی; 1213/14 – 1289) was a Persian Sufi poet, philosopher, and mystic of the 13th century. He is principally known for his mixed prose and poetry work, the Lama'at ("Divine flashes"), as well as his divan (collection of short poems), most of which were written in the form of a ghazal.

Born to a religious and well-read family, during his youth, Iraqi joined a group of qalandars (wandering dervishes) in search for spiritual knowledge. They eventually reached Multan in India, where Iraqi later became a disciple of Baha al-Din Zakariyya (died 1262), the leader of the Multani branch of the Suhrawardiyya, a Sufi order. After the latter's death in 1262, Iraqi briefly became his successor, but was forced to leave due to the envy of his former master's son Sadr al-Din Arif and some of his disciples.

Following a pilgrimage to Mecca, Iraqi settled in Konya in Anatolia, where he became acquainted with many figures, such as his new patron, Mu'in al-Din Parwana (died 1277), an administrator of the Mongol Ilkhanate. Following his patron's disgrace and execution in 1277, Iraqi was accused of collaborating with him, and thus forced to flee. After a brief stay at Sinope, Iraqi moved to Cairo for a few years, and then eventually to Damascus, where he died in 1289.

By successfully combining two mystical schools, the Arabic-speaking Sufism of the Andalusian mystic Ibn Arabi (died 1240), and the Persian poetic style of Sufism, Iraqi managed to give his writings rich and expressive imagery, a feat which had a permanent impact on Iranian spirituality.

== Historiography ==
The anonymous Muqaddima ("Introduction") of Iraqi's divan (collection of short poems) is the main source for his life. Although it was written in same style of Iraqi's era, the American historian William Chittick argues that it may have been composed as late as the 15th century. Another historian, Ève Feuillebois, adds that if this hypothesis is correct, the oldest source that mentions Iraqi would be the Tarikh-i guzida ("Selected historical events"), composed by the historian and geographer Hamdallah Mustawfi (died after 1339/40) in 1330. Context for Iraqi's ghazals are provided by the stories in the Muqaddima, but they have little value in terms of historicity. They focus a lot on Iraqi's shahidbazi ("perhaps excessively" according to Feuillebois), a Sufi custom of staring at young males in order to witness the image of the divine witness.

The Muqaddima served as the main source for later accounts of Iraqi's biography. These sources include the Nafahat al-uns ("Breaths of familiarity") composed between 1476 and 1478 by the poet and hagiographer Jami (died 1492), and the Habib al-siyar ("Beloved of the biographies") by the historian Khvandamir (died 1535/36).

== Biography ==
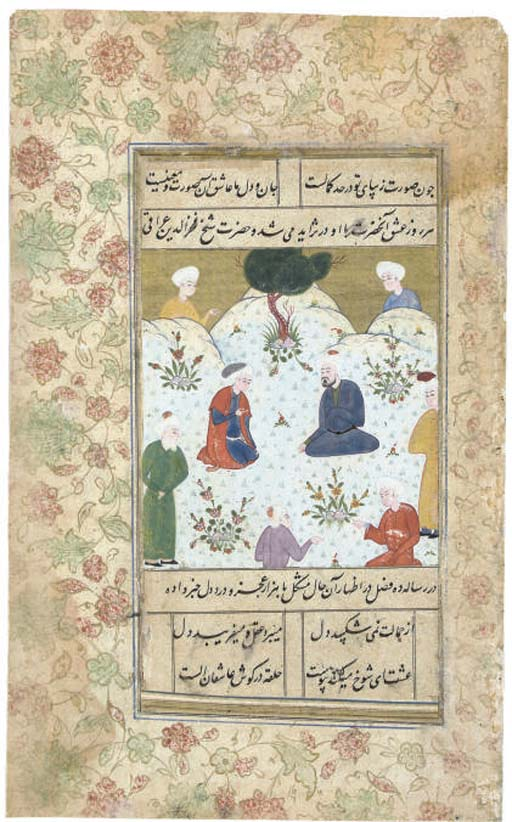
Fakhr al-Din Iraqi with disciples. From a Persian manuscript, dated c. 1580

Of Persian stock, Iraqi was born in 1213/14 in the village of Komjan, close to Hamadan, one of the major cities of Persian Iraq. He was the son of a certain Buzurgmihr ibn Abd al-Ghaffar Jawaliqi, and belonged to a religious and well-read family. By the age of six, Iraqi had reportedly memorized the Quran. He was then educated in religious sciences, and was by the age of seventeen a teacher in a madrasa (religious school) in Hamadan. During one time when Iraqi, still at a young age, was teaching tafsir (interpretation of the Quran), a group of qalandars (wandering dervishes) attended his teaching session. They convinced him to abandon his teachings and join them in search for spiritual knowledge.

They eventually went to the city of Multan in India, where Iraqi met Baha al-Din Zakariyya (died 1262), the leader of the Multani branch of the Suhrawardiyya, a Sufi order. Iraqi first became his disciple two years later, after wandering in India. He continued to stay as Baha al-Din's disciple for 25 years, eventually marrying the latter's daughter and having a son named Kabir al-Din. Following Baha al-Din's death in 1262, Iraqi succeeded him as the head of the order. However, due to the envy of Baha al-Din's son, Sadr al-Din Arif, and some of his disciples, he was shortly afterwards forced to leave Multan.

Along with a group of loyal companions, Iraqi made a pilgrimage to Mecca. While they were on their way in Hijaz, the sultan of Oman unsuccessfully attempted to hold Iraqi back. After the pilgrimage, Iraqi went to the city of Konya in Anatolia. There he started studying with Sadr al-Din al-Qunawi (died 1274), the most prominent disciple of the Andalusian mystic Ibn Arabi (died 1240). It was during this period that Iraqi started writing the Lama'at ("Divine flashes"), a book which Sadr al-Din highly admired. Iraqi watched the sama (spiritual concert) sessions that the prominent Persian poet Rumi (died 1273) organized. He also reportedly attended Rumi's funeral.

Another figure who attended Rumi's sessions was Mu'in al-Din Parwana (died 1277), an administrator of the Mongol Ilkhanate. He became a follower of Iraqi and had a khanaqah (Sufi lodge) constructed in Duqat for him and his students. Iraqi also became acquainted with Shams al-Din Juvayni (died 1284), who served as the minister of the Ilkhanate rulers from 1262 to 1284. Following the disgrace and execution of Parwana, Iraqi was accused of having hidden state property for Parwana, and thus forced to flee. With the help of Shams al-Din Juvayni, Iraqi escaped to the city of Sinope, which was ruled by Parwana's son Mu'in al-Din Muhammad, who was known for his support of Sufis. Iraqi then went to the city of Cairo, where he stayed for some years and gained the support of its ruler, the Mamluk sultan Qalawun (r. 1279–1290).

Along with his son Kabir al-Din, Iraqi later went to the city of Damascus, where he died at the age of 78. He was buried next to Ibn Arabi in the cemetery of the Salihiyya district of Damascus, but nothing of his tomb remains today.

== Works ==
Persian calligraphy of a ghazal of Fakhr al-Din Iraqi and the Tuhfat al-ahrar ("The Gift of the Free") of Jami, dated c. 1760

The divan of Iraqi is mostly written in the form of ghazals and encompasses 4,500 double verses. It includes twenty qasidas (eulogies) about religious and mystical material; a commendation of his teachers Baha al-Din Zakariyya and Sadr al-Din al-Qunawi, as well as the Islamic prophet Muhammad (died 632); seven strophic poems regarding mystical philosophy, and around 200 rubaʿis (quatrains) regarding love, spirituality, and disruptive Sufism, the latter of which is most likely mostly forgery. 300 mystical/love ghazals that were written during his stay in India make up the majority of his poetry. Some of the poems also show influence from philosophy of Ibn Arabi, which demonstrates that they were written after Iraqi met Sadr al-Din al-Qunawi.

Iraqi's famous Lama'at is mixed prose and poetry and consists of 27, or perhaps 28 chapters, as early texts suggest that one of the chapters is two chapters, similar to Ibn Arabi's Fusus al-Hikam ("Bezels of wisdom"). Despite the fact that the work is based on Sadr al-Din al-Qunawi's understanding of Ibn Arabi's works, it is not just a commentary, as it combines Ibn Arabi's philosophy with Persian love-mysticism, thus making it comprehensible and welcomed by the Persians. In the introduction of the work, Iraqi says that he was encouraged by the love treatise Sawanih al-ʿushshaq ("Auspices of the lovers") of the prominent Persian mystic, writer, and preacher Ahmad Ghazali (died 1126).

Iraqi has been credited with the writing of the Istilahat ("Technical terms"), a short book about Sufi terminology. However, it is in reality a variant of the Rashf al-alhaz fi kashf al-alfaz ("Taking in side-glances at the unveiling of technical terms") by another Sufi, the 14th-century writer Sharaf al-Din Husayn ibn Ulfati Tabrizi.

Iraqi was also originally considered the author of the Ushshaq-nama ("Book of lovers"), also known as Dah-nama ("The ten [love] letters"), a masnavi (poem in rhyming couplets) filled with some ghazals. However, the modern historian J. Baldick has argued that it was in reality written roughly thirty years later by one of his admirers, Ata'i. This suggestion has received support by other historians.

== Legacy and assessment ==
By successfully combining two mystical schools, the Arabic-speaking Sufism of Ibn Arabi, and the Persian poetic style of Sufism, Iraqi managed to give his writings rich and expressive imagery, a feat which had a permanent impact on Iranian spirituality.

Iraqi is highly regarded by scholars on Persian literature, such as Saeed Nafisi (died 1966), who regarded his "bold exposition of love mysteries to be unparalleled in all Persian poetry."

== Sources ==
- Bosworth, C. Edmund (1998). "ʿErāq-e ʿAjam(ī)". In Yarshater, Ehsan (ed.). Encyclopædia Iranica. Vol. VIII/5: English IV–Eršād al-zerāʿa. London and New York: Routledge & Kegan Paul. p. 538. ISBN 978-1-56859-054-7.
- Chittick, William C. (1997). "ʿErāqī, Faḵr-al-Dīn Ebrāhīm". In Yarshater, Ehsan (ed.). Encyclopædia Iranica. Vol. VIII/3: Education XX–Elam VI. London and New York: Routledge & Kegan Paul. pp. 538–540. ISBN 978-1-56859-052-3.
- Daneshgar, Majid (2019). Studying the Qur'ān in the Muslim Academy. Oxford University Press. ISBN 978-0190067540.
- Feuillebois, Ève (2017). "ʿIrāqī, Fakhr al-Dīn". In Fleet, Kate; Krämer, Gudrun; Matringe, Denis; Nawas, John; Rowson, Everett (eds.). Encyclopaedia of Islam (3rd ed.). Brill Online. ISSN 1873-9830.
- Peacock, A. C. S. (2019). Islam, Literature and Society in Mongol Anatolia. Cambridge University Press. ISBN 978-1108499361.
