= Sadr al-Din al-Qunawi =

Persian mystical or Sufi philosopher (1207-1274)

Shaykh Ṣadr al-Dīn al-Qūnawī
- صدرالدین قونوی

Personal life
- Born: c. 606 AH | c. 1209 CE Malatya, Sultanate of Rum
- Died: 673 AH | 1274 CE Konya, Sultanate of Rum
- Resting place: Sadreddin Konevi Mosque, Konya
- Parent: Majd al-Dīn Isḥāq
- Notable works: Miftāḥ al-ghayb; Iʿjāz al-bayān fī taʾwīl umm al-Qurʾān; al-Fukūk; al-Nuṣūṣ fī taḥqīq al-ṭawr al-makhṣūṣ; al-Nafaḥāt al-ilāhiyya; Sharḥ al-Arbaʿīn ḥadīthan
- Education: Studied under Ibn Arabi
- Known for: Systematizing and developing Ibn Arabi's metaphysical thought
- Occupation: Sufi, Islamic scholar, jurist, hadith scholar, Qur'anic exegete and philosopher

Religious life
- Religion: Islam
- Denomination: Sunni
- Philosophy: Akbarian thought, waḥdat al-wujūd
- School: Shafi'i
- Lineage: Ibn ʿArabī

Ṣadr al-Dīn Muḥammad ibn Isḥāq ibn Muḥammad ibn Yūnus Qūnawī (Persian: صدر الدین قونوی; 1207–1274) was a philosopher. He was a notable contributor to mystical or Sufi philosophy (which is closely aligned with metaphysics) and influenced the philosophical study of knowledge, epistemology, specifically in reference to the theoretical elaboration of mystical/intellectual insight. He combined the works of mystic-thinker Muḥyī al-Dīn Ibn 'Arabī (1165-1240 CE/560-638 AH) and the logical/philosophical innovations of Ibn Sīnā (Lat., Avicenna).

== Biography ==
Little is known about Qūnawī's personal life. As a young boy, Ṣadr al-Dīn was adopted by Ibn 'Arabī, who also taught him. He was of Persian descent, and he lived and taught in the city of Konya (modern-day Turkey where he is known as Sadreddin Konevî).

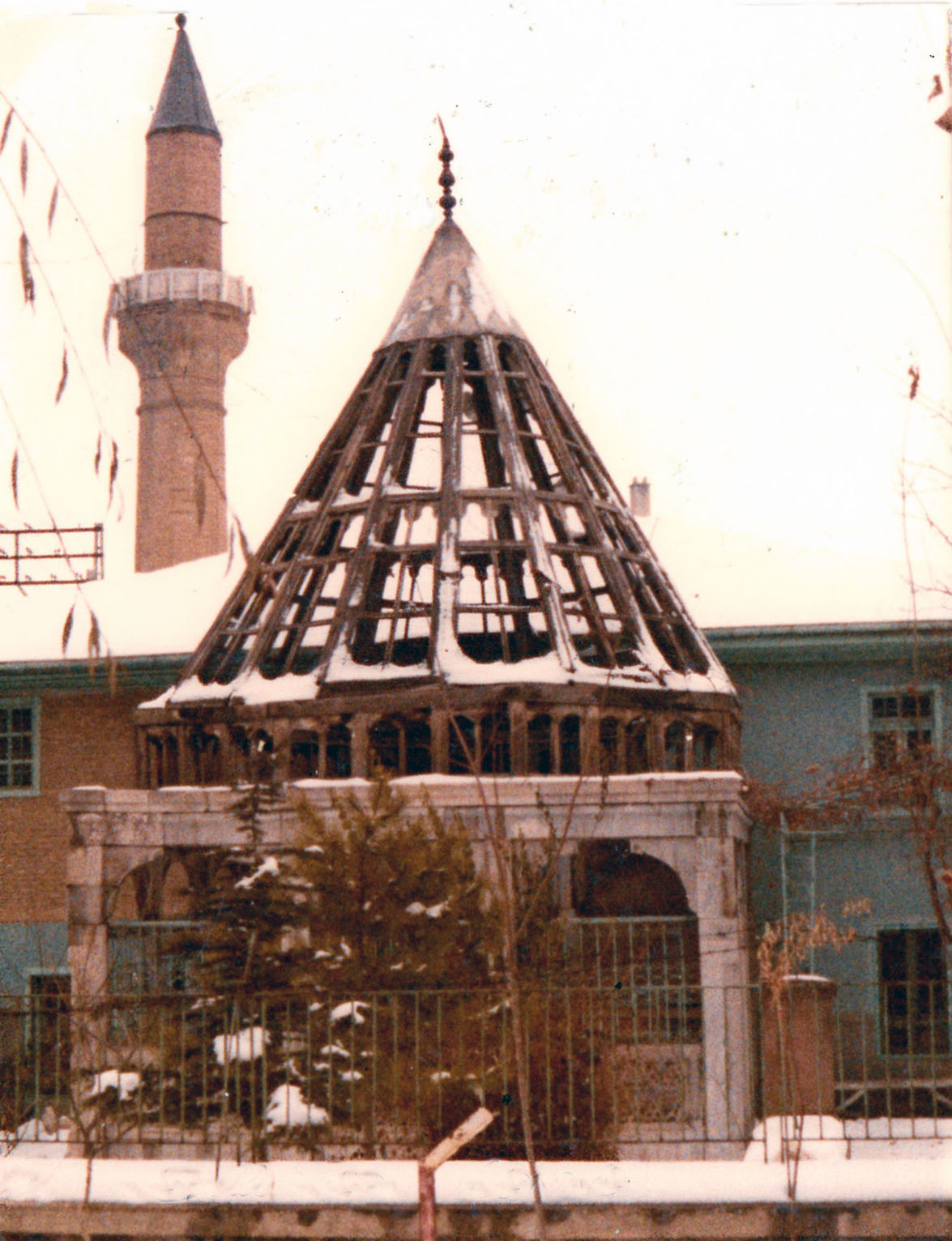
Sadr al-Din al-Qunawi's tomb is in Konya.

He was close to Mawlāna Jalāl-e Dīn Rūmī and participated in his spiritual circle. A master of ḥadīth, people came to Konya from distant lands just to study under him. But while he was reputed for his understanding of the Quran and Ḥadīth, he knew the ancient Peripatetic philosophy, no doubt thanks to Ibn Sīnā, who commented extensively on the works of Aristotle. Qūnawī may have studied an Arabic translation of Aristotle's Metaphysics, being one of a handful of truly insightful, post-Avicennan critics of Aristotle, even if he was not a full-fledged commentator in the spirit of Ibn Rushd.

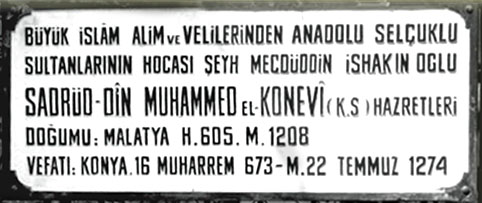
Inscription in Turkish praises him as a scholar, teacher and Sheikh.

Qūnawī's overall influence appears more strategic than wide. Some of his students found fame. Notably, he instructed Qutb al-Din al-Shirazi, who went on to author a well known commentary, on Suhrawardi's Ḥikmat al-Ishrāq. Another student of Qūnawī's, the Sufi poet Fakhr-al-Din Iraqi, played an important role in introducing Ibn 'Arabī into the Persian language.

== Mystical vs. philosophical knowledge ==
After visiting the grave of Ibn 'Arabī after his teacher and father-in-law had died, Qūnavī described a mystical experience he had about his teacher, Ibn 'Arabī:

I walked one summery day through an empty stretch in the Taurus. An easterly wind was stirring the blossoms. I gazed at them and reflected upon God's power, might and majesty (exalted be He). The love of the Merciful [God] filled me with such ardent passion that I labored to part with created things. Then, the spirit of Shaykh Ibn 'Arabī was personified to me in the most splendid form, as if he were a pure light. He called out [to me], “O ye who are perplexed, behold me! If God sublime and transcendent hath shown Himself to me in a flash of manifestation from the noble elevation of the essence, absent hast thou been from me therein by a mere glance of an eye.” I agreed at once and, as if he had been standing there [bodily] before my eyes, the Shaykh al-Akbar [i.e., Ibn Arabī] greeted me with the salutations of reunion after a parting and embraced me affectionately, saying: “Praise be to God who the veil hath lifted and who bringeth those dear unto each other into reunion. No goal, effort or salvation hath been disaffirmed".

His recollection of this dream seems to indicate not just continuing deference to his teacher, but also what he saw as the practical end of reason. While more scientific than his mentor, Qūnavī too was a practising mystic, not just a thinker and teacher. Regardless of his background in the mystical, he excelled in formal sciences like ḥadīth studies, Qurānic exegesis (tafsīr), dialectical theology (kalām), jurisprudence (fiqh), and philosophical sciences. He also corresponded with contemporaries like Nāsīr al-Dīn Ṭūsī, whose mathematical and astronomical discoveries have played a significant role in furthering their respective fields.

Qūnavī's significance primarily arises from his firm place in Islam's "post-Avicennan" (or, more precisely, post-Falsafah) period. The intellectual current to which he belonged to (which notably included Sadr al-Din Shirazi, also called Mulla Sadra) was an important factor for the development of philosophy in Iran.

Although Qūnavī was devoted to the same general philosophical framework as Ibn 'Arabī's, 'Abd al-Raḥmān Jāmī said that, despite the pupil's frustrated attempts to follow in his spiritual footsteps,[34] without a proper study of Qūnavī's works the true intention of Ibn 'Arabī regarding the so-called doctrine of Waḥdat al-Wujūd (a doctrine progeny has ascribed to Ibn 'Arabī) could not be discerned in any manner conforming to both reason and religious law (Jāmī 556). Al-Munāwī (b. 1265) quoted him as saying that his teacher had striven to lead him to a level where God manifested Himself through flashes of manifestation to all seekers, but that he failed (NJK 222). Mystics describe a manifestation of this kind as a “flash,” because the “direct witnessing of the essence” resembles the light, speed, and evanescence of any ordinary flash or lightning.

Al-Qāshānī likened this “flash” to “the illumination appearing to a person that beckons and summons to the Presence of Proximity to the Lord for a journey within God.” Ibn 'Arabī referred to the deep tranquility felt by the saintly “friends of God,” the awliyā’, who take their repose in it. Because tranquility did not always occur to them, it was said they could only take furtive glances at the manifestation, as if in a flash (Hakim 660–61).

Paradoxically, his close relationship with Ibn 'Arabī encouraged Qūnavī to seek a separate path to spiritual enlightenment, and for developing the proper terms with which to express overarching truths, which he felt were accessible only through personal experience, not anyone else's.

== Problem of knowledge ==
Qūnavī considered it his life's task to complete what Ibn Sīnā had begun with his Ishrāqī conception of knowledge. First, he shared with Ibn Sīnā and Ibn 'Arabī the goal of representing the intellectual/spiritual journey in communicable fashion. For him to do this, he felt it must be capable of being passed on to others (pupils, speculatively minded peers, etc.), rather than hoarded in the abstract ether of the mind, as it were. Additionally, it had to be didactically meaningful within a specific time and place, though without losing sight of the root object of knowledge.

He worked out his principles in several treatises. The most concise and substantial statement consists of a theoretical introduction to his magnum opus, "I'jāz al-bayān," the main body of which consists of a mystical analysis of the "Sūrat al-Fātiḥah," the opening chapter of the Quran. In that introduction, Qūnavī plotted the transition from the demonstrative logic of Avicenna's “theological science”, 'ilm ilāhī), to a different kind of logic one might call an “exegetical grammar,” as more or less taught by Ibn 'Arabī.

The theory proposed by Ibn 'Arabī was that “exegetical grammar” was vastly more suited to the movements of the spirit, “dialogue” with God, and in a epistemological sense, the “knowledge of the realities,” an expression that Qūnavī took to be chiefly of Avicennan inspiration. Hoping to give weight to both the Divine and human activity, Qūnavī put forth that God's knowledge of Himself was the root of all knowledge. On the surface, this formulation and the logical corollaries flowing from it appears to seal man's incapacity to discover the “realities of things” on his own. (i.e., by his own inborn faculties).

In a representative sense, human knowledge may be said to rest on the relation between subject and object. Given the subject-object distinction and the limitations of the human faculties, it could be considered impossible to know the realities of things. This theme permeates virtually all of Qūnavī's works. He took up this issue with Naṣīr al-Dīn Ṭūsī (d. 672/1274) in a philosophical correspondence related to "tashkīk" ("systematic ambiguity," a concept key to later philosophy). In that debate, Qūnavī sought to demonstrate under what conditions man may know God, a goal he shared with both philosophers and mystics.

Qūnavī was also able to deepen the transformation of philosophical reason begun by his predecessors. This is because the mechanical logic of Peripatetic philosophy could not overcome the distinction between subject and object (the two most elementary “realities” in every act of knowing) except by correspondence, concomitance, etc. Central to his project, was divine self-revelation. On this matter, Ibn 'Arabī had applied notoriously convoluted reasoning, often by association and in fragmentary outbursts. But like him, Qūnavī viewed divine self-revelation or self-manifestation as the unfolding of a book penned in the form of constructed speech.

To elaborate the principles of self-revelation, he made use of the demonstrative logic inspired by the falsāsifah (Islam's Hellenized philosophers, like Ibn Sīnā) and many Islamic theologians. He felt that his theology had to exhibit concreteness equal to that of "divine speech." (e.g., the "Qur’ān"). He eventually created the mystical type of exegetical grammar, with its own scale or standard for theorization he had wanted to.

== Intellectual environment ==
In his biographical account of Konya's intellectual elite, Aflākī portrayed a close-knit community of mystics and scholars of a surprisingly uninhibited spiritual mien in Konya. Additionally, he portrayed that the large amount migrations to Anatolia had given the frontier capital a cosmopolitan character, making it the envy of every seeker of knowledge but also giving it innumerable foes.

Around this time, Qūnavī's father, Majd al-Dīn Isḥāq, began his career as a statesman and acquired the status of a revered spiritual figure. On his return journey from a pilgrimage to the holy city of Mecca, Isḥāq was accompanied by Muḥyiddīn Ibn 'Arabī, with whom he became friends. When Isḥāq died, his companion reportedly became Ṣadr al-Dīn's stepfather by marrying the widowed mother. Although this is not confirmed beyond reasonable doubt, Qūnawî did became Ibn 'Arabî's close disciple and was given permission to teach all of his works.

Qūnavī's preference for Arabic linguistics, allowed him to become involved in Arabic high culture, even if his mystical "exegetical grammar" must not be collapsed with conventional Arabic grammar.

Arabic provided Qūnavī with links to major centers of knowledge (Damascus, Aleppo, Cairo, etc.), where the religious sciences were taught almost exclusively in the Arabic language. Numerous schools and colleges had earlier been built by the Ayyūbids in Syria and Egypt, where Arabic was studied by people who congregated from all over the Islamic world.

In his work, "al-Nafaāt al-ilāhīyah", Qūnavī noted how the matter of "al-kitābah al-ūlā al-ilāhīyah" (the primary divine writing, a key feature of his doctrine) came to him in an earlier version in the City of Damascus. Damascus, at the time, had fostered a broad intellectual fraternity that was felt across the traditional lines of jurisprudence, even if the religious sciences were more deep-rooted and variegated there than in Konya. Specialized fields like ḥadīth studies, where Qūnavī was an authority and a teacher, exhibited fewer rigid doctrinal standards of admission. Unlike Ibn 'Arabī, who prayed as a Mālikī, Qūnavī was primarily involved with Shāfi'ī jurisprudence, whose practitioners were abundantly represented in the schools.

Despite the Mālikīs small numbers in the schools they had a significant influence, especially in the Quranic sciences. Their numerical preponderance in iqrā’ (Quran recital) and naḥw (grammar) was partly responsible for general interest toward Arabic philology. In view of his special relationship with Ibn 'Arabī, (who prayed as a Mālikī,) Qūnavī could easily access their exegetical sources. However, apart from themes directly inspired by his teacher, there is little evidence of anything peculiarly Mālikī or Maghrebi in the works of Qūnavī, including in grammar. His affiliations remained primarily to the traditional eastern centers of learning, where the Mālikīs were underrepresented. However, he also traveled to Aleppo and Cairo, where he had a faithful following.

Notably Qūnavī's bond with Rūmī, a scholar in his own right but a self-professed opponent of bookish scholars, developed to the point of mutual admiration—according to Aflākī—as Qūnavī continued to produce works rarely equaled in the Arabic sciences. (Huart 281–82).

== Study of the philosophy of language ==
As well as epistemology and metaphysics, the philosophy of language was also a significant philosophical field of study for Qūnavī. He believed that it's “devices of conveyance” (adawāt al-tawṣīl) disclosed “incorporeal and immaterial meanings”. He was similar to Rūmī in this respect, but he was not a literary practitioner (i.e., a poet) after the manner of Rūmī, nor was he even a grammarian by profession.

The challenge was to take the demonstrative science of traditional philosophy toward an exegetical grammar that could act as a quintessential language of experience, where knowledge implied the obligation to instruct in the intricacies of spiritual peregrination, but without substituting this derived knowledge for direct personal experience.

The reflections of Ibn 'Arabī and Qūnavī have a significant focus on the relationship between mawḑū' (subject) and the maṭlūb (object of inquiry); in theological dialectics and religious sciences they are generally known as aṣl (root) and far' (branch). In Qūnavī's view the idea was not to define the root, but to know it.

In his "Nafaḥāt ilāhiyyah," Qūnavī admitted that in that banal sense one could argue the awareness of existence was implied by way of intuition as the cognizance, for which there was no demonstrable proof or true definition and which has merely an indistinct unity. He called this the "first cognizance." However, this was not the biggest issue, he claimed. The difficulty arose with the “second cognizance,” namely, knowledge of the reality distinguishable in itself from other realities—in other words, the uniqueness of the reality.

This constituted the majority of the classical philosophical dilemma that preoccupied Qūnavī. The goal of knowledge was “knowledge of the realities of things.” One may either deny this knowledge to man, on the grounds that his natural faculties were imperfect, or affirm it at the risk of giving him absolute knowledge. Contrasted to the second cognizance stood the first, which consisted of the “awareness of existence” and the perception of its “thingness.” His distinction between this indistinct thingness and singular reality corresponded to the theological division of “subject” (mawḍūc) and “object of inquiry” (maṭlūb)—what is given and what is sought by way of knowledge. The realities, in the plural, consisted of the branches, the manifold qualities of the divine essence, was thought to be the which God manifests Himself by Qūnavī.

Behind this structural view or formulation remained the question: Should what is sought in the quest for knowledge be considered nothing but the original knowing subject revealed? Because the shay’ (thing) is given as the subject, like mawjūd (existent), the “cause of its knowledge is the predominance of that precept by which there is unity with the [thing] known, whatever it may be.” This “unity” between knower and known is what any claim to a knowledge of the reality ultimately had to rest upon; but it is a unity which indicated that we knew the reality in the manner in which it has revealed itself to the other reality, that of the knower, and is not a simple identity of two entities.

Qūnavī described the passage, that occurred with the knowledge of the thing as a unique reality by way of a special “unity”. In other words, knowledge of it in the form of an object of inquiry or “branch.”

== Works ==
- I'jāz al-bayān fī ta’wīl Umm al-Kitāb. Second Edition. Hyderabad, Deccan: Maṭbacat Majlis Dā’irat al-Ma'ārif al-'Uthmānīyah, 1368 AH/1949 CE (also titled "Tafsir al-Fatiha") A lengthy mystical exegesis of selected Quranic verses, and his most important work.
- Kitāb al-fukūk (also titled "Fakk al-Khutum"). Introd., ed. Muḥammad Khwājavī. Tehran: Intishārāt Mawlā, 1371 AHS/1413 AH, pp. 177-316. This is a short seminal commentary on Ibn 'Arabī’s "Fuṣūṣ al-ḥikam"
- Kitāb al-Mufawadat. Briefwechsel Zwischen Șadr ud-Dīn-ee Qūnawī (gest. 673/1274) und Naṣīr ud-dīn Ṭūsī (gest. 672/1274). PhD Thesis. Edited and commented by Gudrun Schubert His correspondence with Nasir al-Din al-Tusi, consisting of “al-Ajwibah”, “al-As’ilah,” and “al-Mufṣiḥah.”
- Kitāb al-nafaḥāt al-ilāhīyah (or Kitāb al-nafaḥāt al-rabbānīyah), ms. 1354. Paris: Bibliothèque Nationale.
- Kitāb al-nuṣūṣ. Copied by Ibrāhīm al-Lārījānī, 1315. Lithographed, Tehran: Kitābkhānah Ḥāmidī, Jamādī al-Thānī 1395 AH/1354 AHS; fol. 274-300.
- Miftāḥ al-ghayb al-jam' wa al-wujūd. (On margins of Miftāḥ al-uns fī sharḥ Miftāḥ ghayb al-jam' wa al-wujūd. Shams Muḥammad b. Ḥamzah b. Muḥammad al-'Uthmānī, or Ibn al-Fanārī al-Ḥanafī. Lithographed in Tehran, 1323 AH. One of Quwnawi's key works. It has long been taught to students in Iran's madrassas who have mastered the most difficult philosophical texts.
- Sharḥ al-arba'īn ḥadīthan. Edited and annotated by Dr. Ḥasan Kāmil Yılmaz. Istanbul: Yıdızlar Matbaası, 1990. Published as Tasavvufî Hadîs Şerhleri ve Konevînin Kırk Hadîs Şerhi An unfinished work on the famous 40 sayings of the Prophet of Islam. Qunawi died before completing this work but he commented on twenty-nine ḥadiths. It provides important elucidations on the "imagination" and other concepts.
- Sharḥ al-asmā’ al-ḥusnā (see “Introduction” for bibliographical information on manuscripts used) A concise explanation of the ninety-nine names of God and their effects at the human level.

== See also ==
- Ibn Arabi
- Qutb al-Din Shirazi
- Nasir al-Din Tusi
- Mulla Shams ad-Din al-Fanari

== Sources ==
- Feuillebois, Ève (2017). "ʿIrāqī, Fakhr al-Dīn". In Fleet, Kate; Krämer, Gudrun; Matringe, Denis; Nawas, John; Rowson, Everett (eds.). Encyclopaedia of Islam (3rd ed.). Brill Online. ISSN 1873-9830.
- Peacock, A. C. S. (2019). Islam, Literature and Society in Mongol Anatolia. Cambridge University Press. ISBN 978-1108499361.
