= History of philosophy in Pakistan =

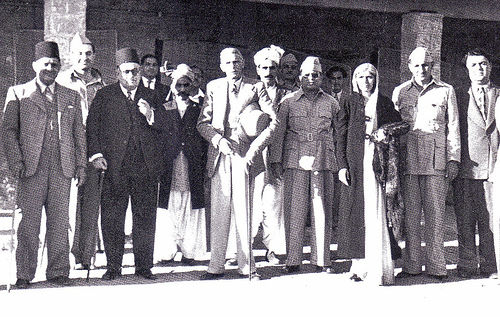
M.A. Jinnah (middle) and Fatima Jinnah (3rd right), stands with the Muslim philosophers at the convention who presented the Idea of Pakistan, circa before 1947.

The history of philosophy in Pakistan is the philosophical activity or the philosophical academic output both within Pakistan and abroad. It encompasses the history of philosophy in the state of Pakistan, and its relations with nature, science, logic, culture, religion, and politics from antiquity in continuity after its establishment in August 1947. Historically, the promulgation of Philosophy in what is now Pakistan has been in relation to Indian Philosophy as well as Persianate philosophy.

In an editorial written by critic Bina Shah in Express Tribune in 2012, "the philosophical activities in Pakistan can nevertheless both reflects and shapes the collected Pakistani identity over the history of the nation."

== History ==
=== Ancient Era ===
The region that makes up Pakistan lies on the core of the Indus Basin, and has been inhabited in continuity for millennia, the earliest known works of Philosophy done in Ancient India involved the Vedas and the Upanishads.

The Rigveda, the first of the four Vedas, was composed in the Punjab region present in Modern Pakistan and Northwestern India, where early Vedic schools also existed. During the Vedic era, metaphysical concepts such as the ones on existence in the Nasadiya Sukta and on creation in the Hiraṇyagarbha Sūkta were prominent. The Vedic concept of cosmic order developed firstly among priest-philosophers dwelling along the Indus Basin, which provided the metaphysical foundation for later developments in the Dharmic traditions.

The renowned Institute of Ancient Taxila was established around the 6th century BC in the city of Taxila in Northern Punjab as an Achaemenid Satrapal capital, and a seat of Vedic philosophy. It later evolved into a center of Jain philosophy, and most prominently, of Buddhist teachings as well as a hub of education in religious and secular topics in South Asia and beyond for centuries to come. Gandhara in Northern Pakistan itself would continue to serve as a prominent center of philosophy in the Asian continent for many centuries.

Pāṇini
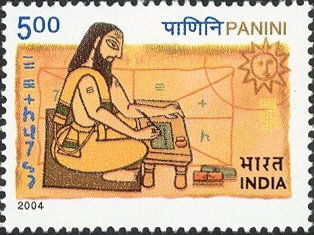

Pāṇini, an ancient Sanskrit Grammarian was born in the region of Modern Pakistan roughly around the 7th, 6th or the 4th century BC. Considered the greatest linguist of antiquity, his primary work, the Aṣṭādhyāyī, brought forth an algorithmic approach to grammar and a formal model of language. Since the exposure of European scholars to his works in the 19th century, Pāṇini has largely been considered the "first descriptive linguist" in history, and even labelled as "the father of linguistics". His approach to grammar influenced such foundational linguists as Ferdinand de Saussure and Leonard Bloomfield. The rigorous formal system developed by Pāṇini far predates the 19th century innovations of Gottlob Frege and the subsequent development of mathematical logic. He is sometimes also believed to have anticipated formal-systems thinking 2,300 years in advance.

Piṅgala, an ancient Indian mathematician known for his works on Combinatorics and an early, explicit use of Zero, is often considered by some to be Pāṇini's brother. The combinatorial rules for metres developed by Pingala that were based on moraic time units (mātrās) were the mathematical foundation for the sequence known as Fibonacci numbers in the West. This sequence of numbers was later formalized by Indian mathematicians Virahānka (c. 6th–8th century CE) and Hemachandra (c. 1150 CE), centuries prior to Fibonacci.

During Alexander the Great's invasion of the Indus Valley, he encountered the Gymnosophists on the banks of the Indus River in Modern Pakistan. Mentioned several times in Ancient Greek records, they were known for their extreme ascetic philosophy. Dandamis, a gymnosophist, and the guru of Kalanos were among the two philosophers specifically mentioned by the Greek records. Alexander had invited Dandamis to his court, and had told him of Socrates, Pythagoras and Diogenes, who, after learning of them, considered them "of good natural parts but to have passed their lives in too much awe of the laws." Dandamis also rejected Alexander's invitation, whereas Kalanos had accepted it, traveling west with his army, and engaging Greek philosophers in debate along the way, eventually dying of self-immolation at Susa.

It was believed by Diogenes Laërtius (fl. 3rd century AD) that Pyrrho of Ellis, the founder of Pyrrhonism was deeply influenced by the gymnosophists while in India with Alexander the Great, and on his return to Ellis, developed his philosophy based on these gymnosophists.

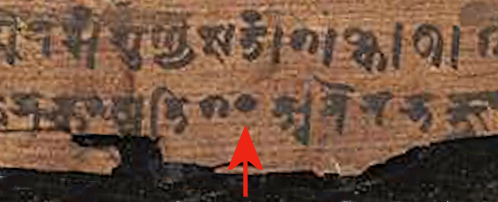
Bakhshali manuscript from Pakistan, showing the first ever use of the numeral "zero".

In the field of Mathematical philosophy, the invention of Zero holds major significance. The earliest known use of the numeral for Zero occurred in the Bakhshali manuscript, discovered in the Mardan district in Pakistan. It is often considered "the oldest extant manuscript in Indian mathematics.

Cāṇakya, the purported author of the political treatise, the Arthashastra, and one of the earliest thinkers of Political Philosophy was believed to have been born in Gandhara. Acting as the Prime Minister to Chandragupta, the founder of the Mauryan Empire, his text is considered among the oldest works on statecraft, economic policy, and law, acting as a guide to administering a kingdom.

=== Greater Gandharan Philosophy ===
With the rise of Buddhism and the subsequent synthesis of Hellenistic culture in Pakistan, a new type of philosophy emerged in what is now Pakistan, Afghanistan and Northwestern India, called the Greco-Buddhist or the Gandharan Buddhist philosophy. As philosophy flourished, it was spread to various corners of Asia via the Silk Road connection. Taxila became an attractive seat of learning for people from various different nations.

The first wave of Buddhist missionary work is associated with the Gāndhārī language and the Kharoṣṭhī script according to a growing consensus in scholarship.^{: 97} However, there is also evidence that almost all the Buddhist schools used Gāndhārī:

It is true that most manuscripts in Gāndhārī belong to the Dharmaguptakas, but virtually all schools — inclusive Mahāyāna — used some Gāndhārī. Von Hinüber (1982b and 1983) has pointed out incompletely Sanskritised Gāndhārī words in works heretofore ascribed to the Sarvāstivādins and drew the conclusion that either the sectarian attribution had to be revised, or the tacit dogma "Gāndhārī equals Dharmaguptaka" is wrong. Conversely, Dharmaguptakas also resorted to Sanskrit.^{:99}

The Dharmaguptaka Vinaya (or monastic rules), flourishing through Gandhara, are still followed today in China, Vietnam and Korea.

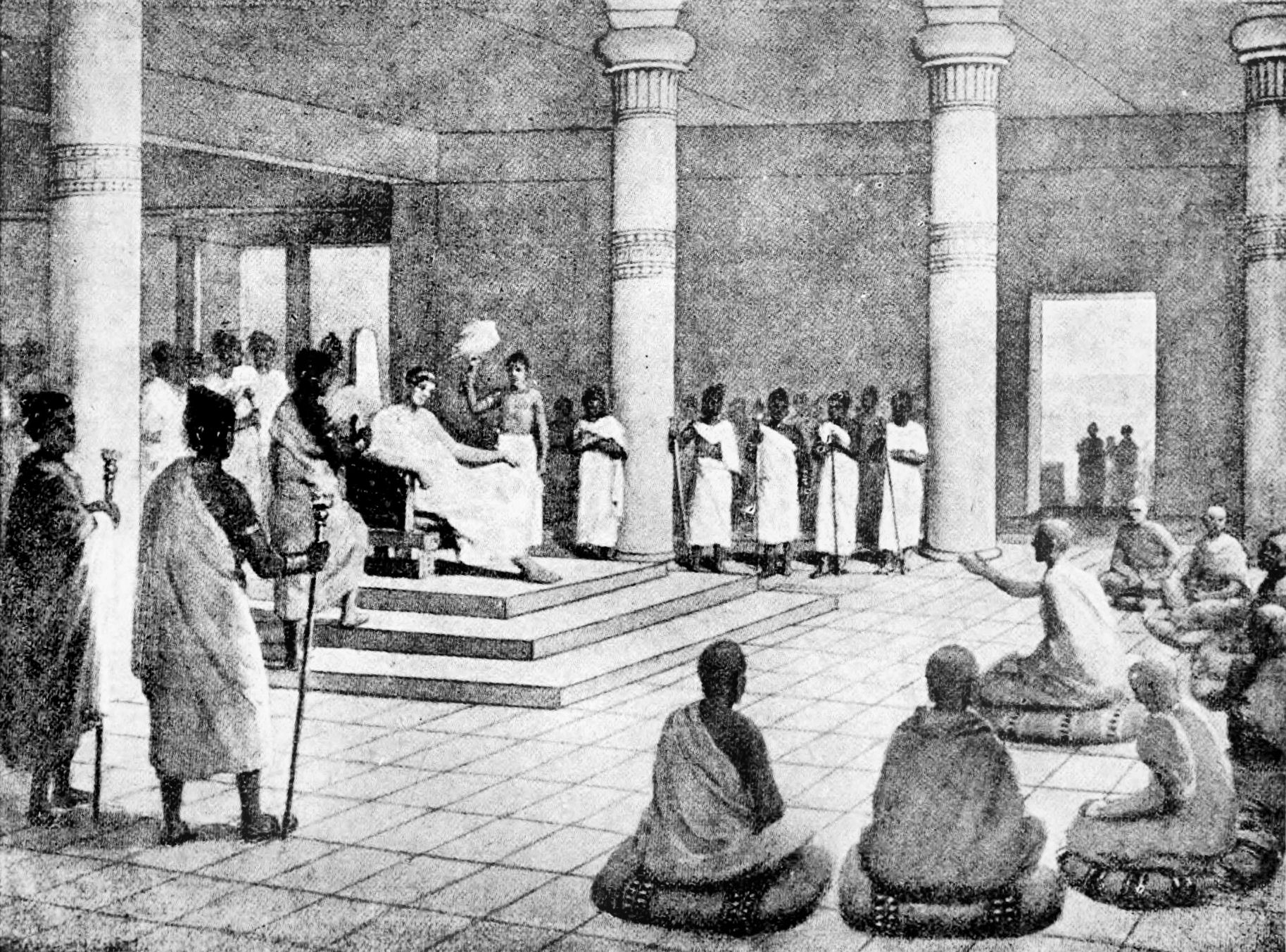
King Milinda's court in Sagala

The Milindapañha, composed in Sialkot (then known as Sagala) was a widely prominent philosophical text detailing a debate between the Indo-Greek king Menander I (Milinda) and a Buddhist sage Nagasena. Thomas Rhys Davids considered it the greatest work of classical Indian prose, he says:

"[T]he 'Questions of Milinda' is undoubtedly the masterpiece of Indian prose, and indeed is the best book of its class, from a literary point of view, that had then been produced in any country."

The background depiction given by the records of the text show that the region of Gandhara and Punjab were at that time, prominent centers of learning for all forms of philosophy, with Buddhist philosophy being the dominant form among them.

Vasubandhu and Asanga, two half-brothers likely born around Peshawar, remain some of the most influential Buddhist philosophers to date. Vasubandhu's works set forth the standard for the Yogacara metaphysics of "appearance only" (vijñapti-mātra), which has been described as a form of "epistemological idealism", phenomenology and close to Immanuel Kant's transcendental idealism. In Jōdo Shinshū (the largest branch of Japanese Buddhism), he is considered the Second Patriarch; in Chan Buddhism (the originating tradition of Zen), he is the 21st Patriarch. Similarly, Asanga's works were also influential in the Abhidharma tradition, and his Maitreya Corpus in turned influenced Buddhism in China, Korea and Japan. Together, these half-brothers were considered as some of the foremost figures in Mahayana philosophy.

Philosophies like hetuvidyā (logic and epistemology), vyākaraṇa (linguistics), śīla (ethics), and tattvavidyā (metaphysics) remained influential during the Gandharan period.

=== Role in Buddhist Esoteric Philosophy and the Natha Tradition ===
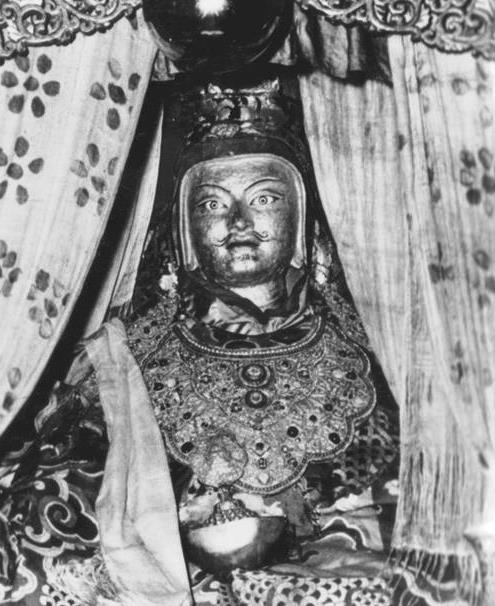
The famous "looks like me" statue of Padmasambhava at Samye, which is traditionally said to have been blessed by him personally

The region of Northern Pakistan, especially the Swat Valley, has played a vital and foundational role in the development of early Vajrayāna. Guru Padmasambhava, revered as the founder of the Nyingma School and as the Second Buddha, is largely considered to have been born in Oddiyana (Swat). He established Tantric teachings in Tibet and is thought to be responsible for the eventual Buddhist religious domination in Tibet, being venerated to a great degree by the local Tibetans to this day. Similarly, Garab Dorje, the human founder of the Dzogchen (Great Perfection) linaege is also thought to have been born in Oddiyana.

Out of the many Mahasiddhas shared by both Vajrayana and Natha Sampradaya, several are considered to have been born in the lands of what is now modern Pakistan. Most famously, Guru Gorakhnath, the founder of the Nath Sampradaya itself is believed to have been born in Peshawar or West Punjab. Gorakhnath and his teacher, Matsyendranatha, developed Hatha Yoga, a highly philosophical branch of Yoga utilising intense physical activities to attain esoteric goals.

The Natha Yogis used esoteric and symbolic philosophy for their goals. According to Mikel Burley, some of the siddhis mentioned are symbolic references to well-desired soteriological goals. For instance, the Vayu Siddhi (conquest of the air) literally implies rising into the air as in levitation, but it likely has a symbolic meaning of "a state of consciousness into a vast ocean of space" or "voidness" ideas found respectively in Hinduism and Buddhism. The Natha Yogi also wrote the earliest known works in Old Punjabi, enabling the language to be able to express higher and subtle ideas, paving the way for Punjabi philosophy.

=== Early Islamic Era ===
Via the Sufi missionaries from Persia and Central Asia, Islam was spread into the lands of the Indus Basin during the early medieval period, converting a majority of the regional Buddhist and Hindu population to Islam. Ali al-Hujwiri, a migrant from Persia to Punjab, became some of the earliest Muslim mystic philosophers in the region.

The famous Iranic polymath Al-Bīrūnī came to the region in early 11th century AD and spent his time learning Sanskrit, studying with Brahmin pandits, and conducting first-hand ethnographic and astronomical research. He eventually wrote the Taḥqīq mā li-l-Hind, a systematic, comparative study of Indian religion, philosophy, caste, astronomy, mathematics, and customs. He also translated several Indian philosophical and religious works into Arabic and provided his own commentaries for them. Annemarie Schimmel described the work as the first objective book on the history of religion. At Nandana, Punjab (present-day Pakistan), Al-Bīrūnī also devised a method of determining the Earth's radius by means of the observation of the height of a mountain.

A Punjabi Muslim mystic named Farīduddīn Masūd Ganjshakar (known commonly as Baba Farid) was among the earliest figures of Muslim philosophy in the present region of Punjab. Venerated by Muslims, Hindus and Sikhs alike, he remains one of the most revered Muslim mystics from South Asia during the Islamic Golden Age.

In around the 10th century AD, an Ismaili State was established over a portion of the lower Punjab region in modern day Pakistan. While Ismaili philosophy was becoming Neoplatonic in this era, the Ismailis of Multan developed their own syncretic, religious culture. Eventually, the Imam-Caliph al-Muʿizz dispatched Jalam bin Shayban to the region to replace the Multan's previous Da'i who had been accused of promoting a syncretic version of Islam that incorporated Hindu rites. A correspondence between the two has survived in Al-Qāḍī al-Nuʿmān's Kitāb al-Majālis, where the two discuss hermeneutics and esoteric philosophy in connection with Multan. Similarly, Multan remained of great importance during the Qarmatian period in the region, and it is believed by some that the Ismaili duʿāt introduced the tradition of Muslim philosophy into the Indian intellectual environment and that Multan possessed Ismaili educational centers and libraries before Maḥmūd's destruction of the polity:

"Multan was the centre of Qaramite government where philosophy flourished to a great extent."

After the Ismaili interlude, the region of Pakistan continued to develop into an epicentre of Sunni Sufi thought. Bahā'-ud-Dīn Zakariyā (born in Multan), studied under Shihab al-Din 'Umar al-Suhrawardi in Baghdad, and eventually returned to establish the Suhrawardi Order in South Asia. At the same time, the Chishti Order was prominent in Lahore, who were criticised by Bahā'-ud-Dīn Zakariyā for their supposedly extreme asceticism and advocacy for poverty. Multan subsequently came to be celebrated as the ‘Baghdad of the East,’ a designation associated in modern accounts with its flourishing under Zakariya. One of Bahāʾ-ud-Dīn Zakariyā's most prominent disciples was the Persian Sufi poet Fakhr al-Dīn ʿIrāqī, who studied in Multan for a long period of time, eventually becoming his successor. After Zakariyā's death in 1262, ʿIrāqī briefly succeeded him before opposition from members of the Suhrawardi establishment forced him to leave Multan. He then travelled westward, eventually settling in Konya. ʿIrāqī later encountered Ṣadr al-Dīn al-Qūnawī, a close disciple and major interpreter of Ibn ʿArabī, and attended his teachings on Ibn ʿArabī's Fuṣūṣ al-Ḥikam. Under Qūnawī's influence and using what he had learnt in Multan, ʿIrāqī composed the Lamaʿāt (“Divine Flashes”), a major Persian exposition of mystical love incorporating elements of Ibn ʿArabī's metaphysical thought. Thereby turning Multan into an important early stage in the eventual transmission of Ibn ʿArabī's ideas into Persian Sufi literature.

As the Islamic Golden Age began, the region of Modern Pakistan further played an important role in its promulgation. Abu Ali al-Sindhi, the tutor of Bayazid Bastami, is thought to have brought the concept of Fana to his student. Whereas, Kankah of Sindh, a prominent Astronomer of the time was among the earliest translators of Indic philosophical and scientific texts into Arabic for the Caliphate. Meanwhile, mathematics and logic were further promoted by people belonging to the Indus Basin. Indian mathematical knowledge, including the decimal place-value system, entered Arabic Mathematics during this broader period, allowing Al-Khwārizmī to later expound on it, further leading to its Latin transmission which became important for European Mathematics.

=== Classical and Late Islamic Era ===
During the Middle Ages, philosophy in the region of Modern Pakistan focused primarily on Islamic Mysticism. However, a trend of Humanism can be seen during the Middle Ages. Shah Abdul Latif Bhittai from Sindh was known for his metaphysical romanticism and symbolic philosophy. Similarly, Bulleh Shah from Punjab, considered the 'Father of Punjabi Enlightenment', opposed religious orthodoxy and remains one of the most influential humanistic philosophers from South Asia. Shah Hussain, a Malāmatī Sufi poet and saint, pioneered the Kafi form in Punjabi poetry. Meanwhile, Sultan Bahu, a major populariser of the concept of Waḥdat al-Wujūd in the subcontinent introduced the Siharfi (acrostic-alphabet) in Punjabi.

Pīr Rōshān, a Pashtun Sufi thinker born in the Punjab, founded the Roshani Movement. Described as heterodoxical movement with Millenarianism view, it was popular with the Pashtun populations in the region of modern KPK and Afghanistan. The movement itself challenged Pashtun tribal society, raising issues of leadership, authority, and social ethics. Pir Roshan advocated for egalitarianism, and questioned the injustices of the Mughal rulers of his time. During his lifetime and position as leader of the movement, the pantheistic character of the Roshaniyya movement and its mass millenarian appeal were overwhelming. After his death death in 1575 the pantheistic Sufi character of the movement became less and less prominent.

Khuśḥāl Khān Khaṭṭak, a prolific writer and known as the "Father of Pashto Literature", was born in Nowshera, Khyber Pakhtunkhwa in modern-day Pakistan. His central philosophical-political project was an argument for Pashtun tribal unity as a precondition for resisting Mughal domination via ethics of ghayrat (honor/pride) and nang (dignity) supposed to override the fragmenting effects of the Pashtunwali, with its competing logics of badal (revenge) and nanawatai (sanctuary). Making it a work of applied Pashtun political philosophy regarding the conversion of a customary ethical code into a basis for collective political action.

During the late middle era Rahman Baba engaged in Pashtun Quietist philosophy, whereas Sachal Sarmast engaged in a Persian-Sindhi metaphysical synthesis and defended Ibn Arabi’s ideas, further popularising these concepts in Sindh.

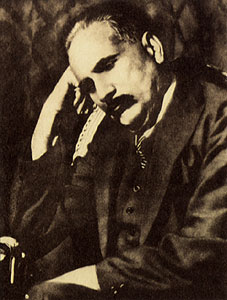
A portrait of Allama Muhammad Iqbal

=== Colonial Era ===
Philosophy in Pakistan greatly declined during the Colonial era with the destruction of old institutions. As the British colonized South Asia, new thoughts began to emerge. The most prominent figure during this was Sir Muhammad Iqbal. Widely considered one of the most important and influential Muslim thinkers and Islamic religious philosophers of the 20th century, his vision of a cultural and political ideal for the Muslims of British India is widely regarded as having animated the impulse for the Pakistan Movement. His concepts of Khudi and Mard-e-Momin borrow heavily from Friederich Nietzsche's concepts of the Ego and the Übermensch. Iqbal's ideal opposed what he considered the Self-Negation dominant in Hindu and Sufi pantheism, and advocated for a Self-Affirming philosophy.

Inspired by the Aligarh Movement, Philosophy among the Muslims of India in general was mostly political and reactionary during this era, aimed at safeguarding the future of the Indo-Islamic heritage. Pakistan Movement itself was a product of young Nationalist thinkers such as Chaudhry Rehmat Ali.

Inayatullah Khan Mashriqi, a Cambridge-trained mathematician and Islamic scholar founded the Khaksar Movement, creating of a paramilitary discipline-and-service ethic among his followers. He was known for his anti-imperialist and modernist ideas, engaging in a rationalist, scientificaly inflected re-reading of the Quran. On the other hand, figures like Abul A'la Maududi were among the most influential Islamist thinkers of the era, influenced by Ibn Taymiyya, and staunchly opposed concepts like Nationalism, Feminism, Socialism and Secularism. Maududi is also considered one of the founding fathers of modern Islamic economics, and is known to have laid "down the foundations for development" of Islamic economics.

The Colonial era also saw the establishment of the Ahmadiyya by Mīrzā Ghulām Aḥmad, who spent much of his early time in Sialkot, and remained active in the region later as well. Originally starting as a polemicist defending Islam against the Hindu and Christian apologetics, he later declared himself as a reformer of Islam and the Promised Messiah, founding the Messianic movement of the Ahmadiyya.

=== Post-Independence ===
When Pakistan gained independence there was only one philosophy department in the country, at Government College Lahore. Academically, philosophical activities began in the universities, and with the thought organization founded by philosopher M.M. Sharif, a pupil of G. E. Moore, in 1954. M.M. Sharif himself was an Analytic philosopher who delved into Post-Modern thought. An active figure in the Pakistan Movement, he was deeply interested in realism and attempted to synthesize Modern Muslim thought with Western Philosophy.

C.A. Qadir, born in Sialkot, was another Pakistani Analytic philosopher and psychologist. A critical student of Islamic philosophy, he wrote over thirty books on philosophy, ethics, and psychology.

Fazlur Rahman Malik, born in the Hazara District, was recognised as one of the most influential Islamic reformers and among the most important thinkers in post-independence Pakistan. His philosophy sought a return to the supposed intellectual dynamism of early Islam, and significantly contributed to the development of a contextual approach to examining the Quran. A prominent thinker in Islamic Modernism and Ijtihad, he also wrote notable works such as Avicenna's Psychology and Islam and Modernity.

Between the 1960s and the 1980s, Socialist philosophy, although repressed, began to gain popularity in Pakistan. Figures like Faiz Ahmad Faiz, Habib Jalib and Rusool Bux Palijo were among the prominent Socialist thinkers in Pakistan.

Malik Meraj Khalid, the caretaker prime minister of Pakistan from November 1996 to February 1997, and the fifth Chief Minister of Punjab from 1972 to 1973, was a Marxist Philosopher and one of the founding figures of the Pakistan People's Party. Around the early 1990s, he left politics and entered a period of solitude, becoming the Rector of International Islamic University in Islamabad in 1997.

In contemporary times, figures like Javed Ahmad Ghamidi have contributed heavily to Islamic Modernism, and exagesis. He has also worked on counter-narratives to Sufi Mysticism within Islam, and has written extensively on moral and ethical issues within Islam. On the other hand, figures like Israr Ahmed continued the Islamist political-philosophical tradition in the country. Meanwhile, women like Riffat Hassan and Asma Barlas have acted as prominent Islamic Feminist philosophers, and have engaged in Quranic hermeneutics and theology.

Manzoor Ahmed, a Pakistani Scientist and Philosopher has worked in the field of Philosophy of science, particularly the problems pertaining to Consciousness and the Philosophy of space and time.

In Modern Pakistan today, there is a much greater tilt towards and institutional support for Analytic Philosophy as compared to Continental Philosophy. A survey of philosophy departments in Pakistan noted the emphasis placed on mainstream analytic philosophy in courses on twentieth-century Western thought, with thinkers such as Bertrand Russell and Ludwig Wittgenstein receiving more attention.

Although philosophy is taught as a allied subject in various universities in Pakistan today, and as an optional subject in Pakistani high schools in 11th and 12th grade, the major is only being offered at the Government College University, Lahore's Department of Philosophy and Liberal Arts, Punjab University's Department of Philosophy, and Karachi University's Department of Philosophy and is continously diminishing and decaying out.

== Notable figures ==
Notable Pakistani philosophers include:

- Allama Muhammad Iqbal
- Malik Meraj Khalid
- C. A. Qadir
- Syed Zafarul Hasan
- Burhan Ahmed Farooqi
- M.M. Sharif
