= Culture of Pakistan =

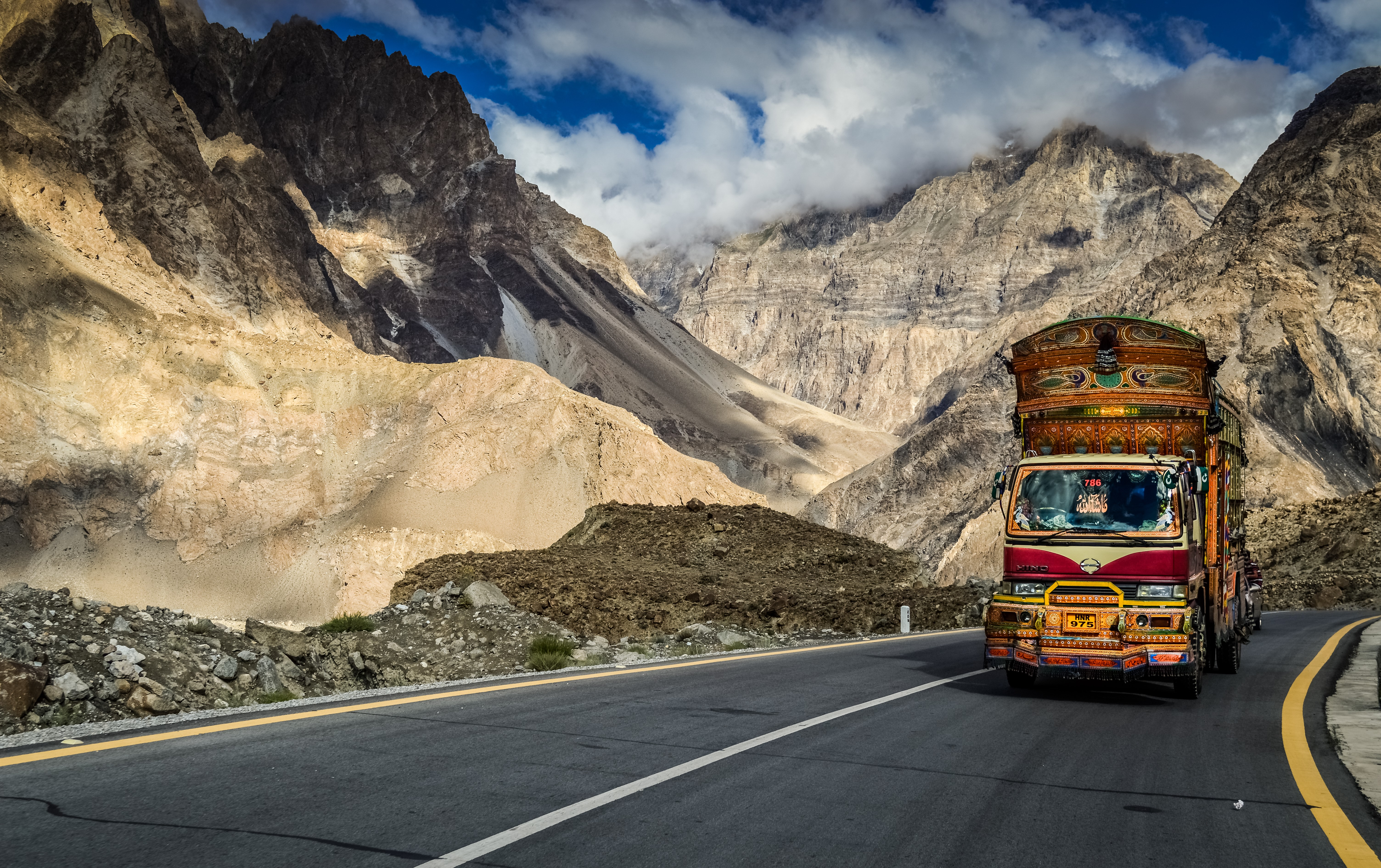
Truck art is a distinctive feature of Pakistani culture

The culture of Pakistan (Urdu: ثقافتِ پاکستان, romanized: S̱eqāfat-e Pākistān) comprises Turco-Persian, Arab, Afghan and North Indian cultural traditions and has persisted for centuries and encompasses the cultural diversity of the nation. Its location at the crossroads of Central, South and West Asia historically made it a hub of diversity. Over centuries, the region has developed a distinct cultural identity, shaped by a fusion of Middle Eastern, Central Asian and North Indian influences. Additionally, Pakistan's diverse ethnic groups maintain unique cultural traditions, particularly in dress, cuisine, and religious practices, with certain pre-Islamic customs continuing to influence local traditions despite the overarching framework of Islamic culture. Marriages and other major events are also significantly different among the different ethnic groups.

Until 1979, Pakistan maintained a relatively liberal Islamic identity; however, the Islamization policies introduced that year led to a widespread infusion of conservative Islamic principles into various aspects of culture and daily life. This shift significantly reshaped the historical values and traditions of the country's Muslim population, reinforcing religious conservatism in social and cultural norms.

Civil society in Pakistan is largely hierarchical, emphasising local cultural etiquette and traditional Islamic values that govern personal and political life. The basic family unit is the extended family, although for socio-economic reasons there has been a growing trend towards nuclear families. The traditional dress for both men and women is the shalwar kameez; trousers, jeans, and shirts are also popular among men. In recent decades, the middle class has increased to around 35 million and the upper and upper-middle classes to around 17 million, and power is shifting from rural landowners to the urbanised elites. Pakistani festivals, including Eid-ul-Fitr, Eid-ul-Azha, Ramazan, Christmas and Easter are mostly religious in origin. Increasing globalisation has resulted in Pakistan ranking 56th on the A.T. Kearney/FP Globalization Index.

== Literature ==
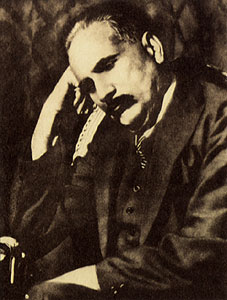
Muhammad Iqbal, Pakistan's national poet who conceived the idea of Pakistan

Pakistan has literature in Urdu, Persian, Sindhi, Punjabi, Pashto, Balochi, English, and many other languages. The Pakistan Academy of Letters is a large literary community that promotes literature and poetry in Pakistan and abroad. The National Library publishes and promotes literature in the country. Before the 19th century, Pakistani literature consisted mainly of lyric and religious poetry and mystical and folkloric works. During the colonial period, native literary figures were influenced by western literary realism and took up increasingly varied topics and narrative forms. Prose fiction is now very popular.

The national poet of Pakistan, Allama Muhammad Iqbal, wrote poetry in Urdu and Persian. He was a strong proponent of the political and spiritual revival of Islamic civilisation and encouraged Muslims all over the world to bring about a successful revolution (regarding to the freedom from Colonial powers). Well-known figures in contemporary Pakistani Urdu literature include Muhammad Iqbal, Faiz Ahmed Faiz, Mirza Ghalib, Ahmed Faraz, Parveen Shakir and Saadat Hasan Manto. Sadequain and Gulgee are known for their calligraphy and paintings. The Sufi poets Shah Abdul Latif, Bulleh Shah, Mian Muhammad Bakhsh, and Khawaja Farid enjoy considerable popularity in Pakistan. Mirza Kalich Beg has been termed the father of modern Sindhi prose. Historically, philosophical development in the country was dominated by Muhammad Iqbal, Sir Syed Ahmad Khan, Muhammad Asad, Maududi, and Mohammad Ali Johar.

Ideas from British and American philosophy greatly shaped philosophical development in Pakistan. Analysts such as M. M. Sharif and Zafar Hassan established the first major Pakistani philosophical movement in 1947. After the 1971 war, philosophers such as Jalaludin Abdur Rahim, Faiz Ahmed Faiz, Gianchandani, and Malik Khalid incorporated Marxism into Pakistan's philosophical thinking. Influential work by Manzoor Ahmad, Jaun Elia, Hasan Askari Rizvi, and Abdul Khaliq brought mainstream social, political, and analytical philosophy to the fore in academia. Works by Noam Chomsky have influenced philosophical ideas in various fields of social and political philosophy.

== Performing arts ==
=== Music ===
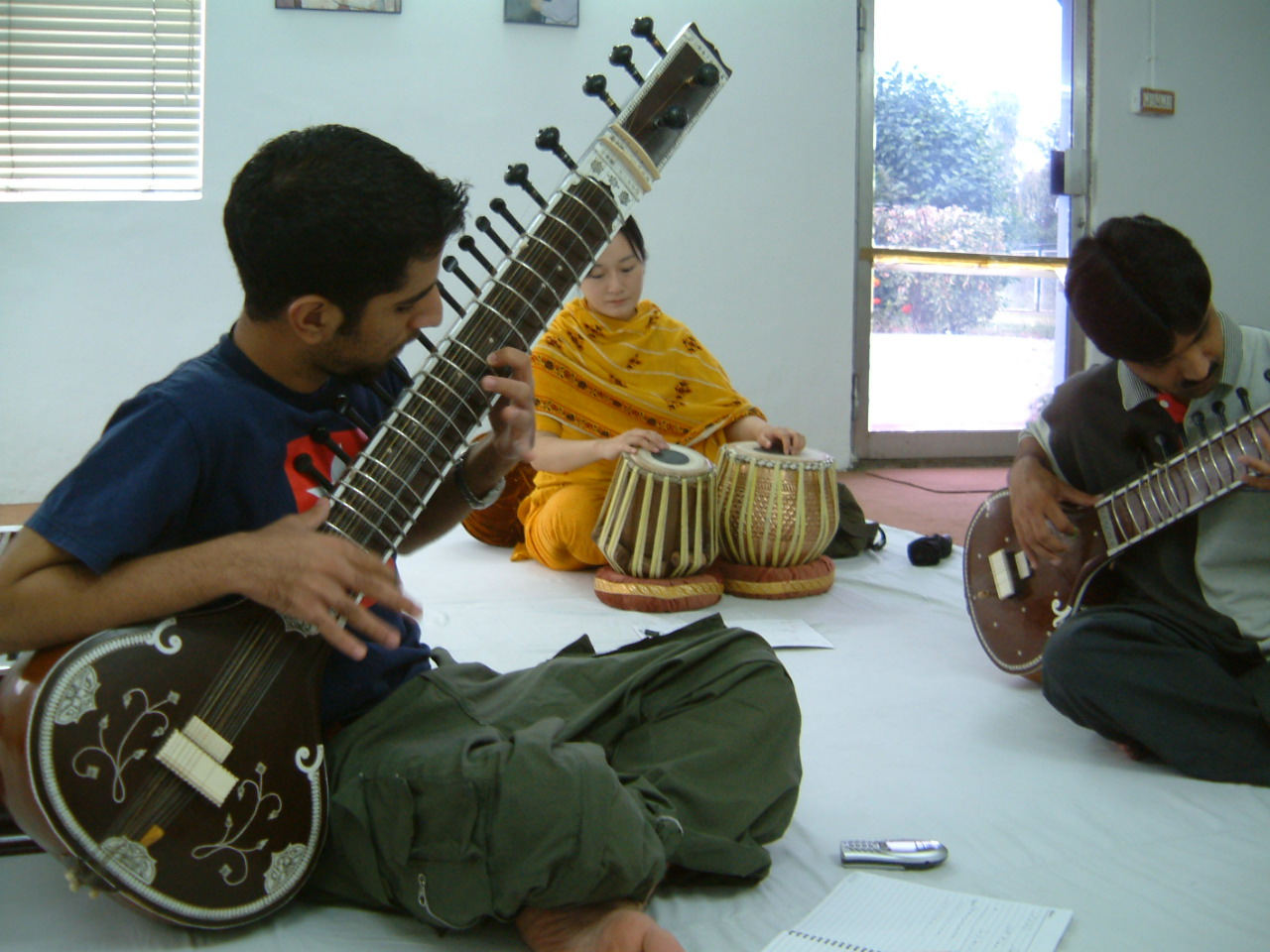
A sitar workshop in Islamabad, Pakistan.

Pakistani music ranges from diverse forms of provincial folk music and traditional styles such as Qawwali and Ghazal to modern musical forms that fuse traditional and western music.

=== Dances ===
Pakistan has various regional dances including:

==== Punjabi ====
- Giddha - Punjabi folk dance, a popular folk dance of women
- Dahamal – Punjabi folk dance (The dance is rooted in Sufi trance dances on trance drum beats)
- Jhumar – Punjabi folk dance
- Luddi - Punjabi folk dance, mostly performed on weddings

==== Balochi ====
- Chaap – Baloch folk dance performed at weddings

==== Pashtun ====
- Attan – Folk dance of Pashtuns tribes of Pakistan including the unique styles of Quetta and Waziristan
- Khattak Dance – Sword dance of Khattak tribe in Khyber Pakhtunkhwa

==== Sindhi ====
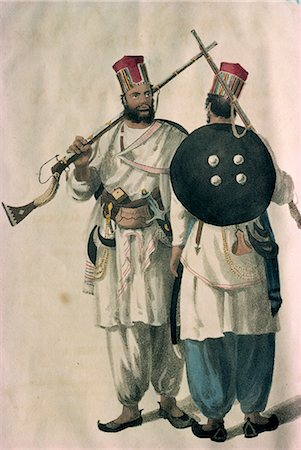
Artistic depiction of Sindhi soldiers during medieval times

- Jamalo – Sindhi dance.
- Jhumir: wedding dance.
- Dhamal: performed by Sindhi Sufi devotees on Sufi shrines. The main performance is done by Sufi dervishes who wear long Jamas, special rings, necklaces and Sindhi faqeeri topi or turban.

=== Drama and theatre ===
These are very similar to stage plays in theatres. They are performed by well-known actors and actresses in the Lollywood industry. The dramas and plays often deal with themes from everyday life, often with a humorous touch.

== Architecture ==
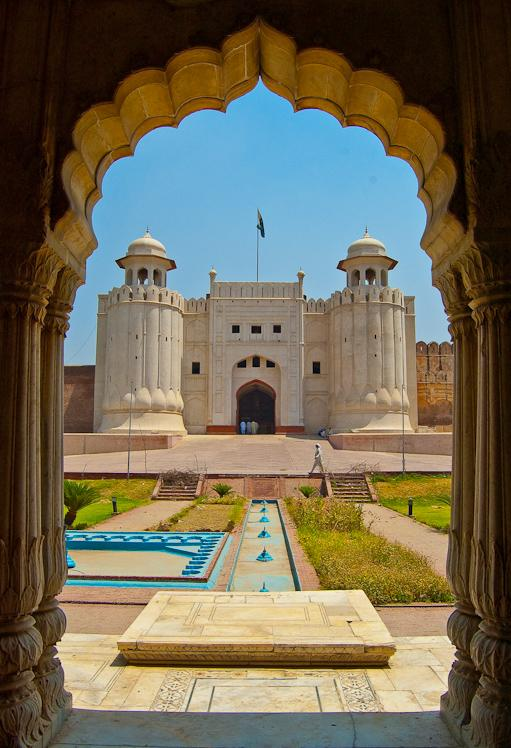
The Lahore Fort, a landmark built during the Mughal era, is a UNESCO World Heritage Site

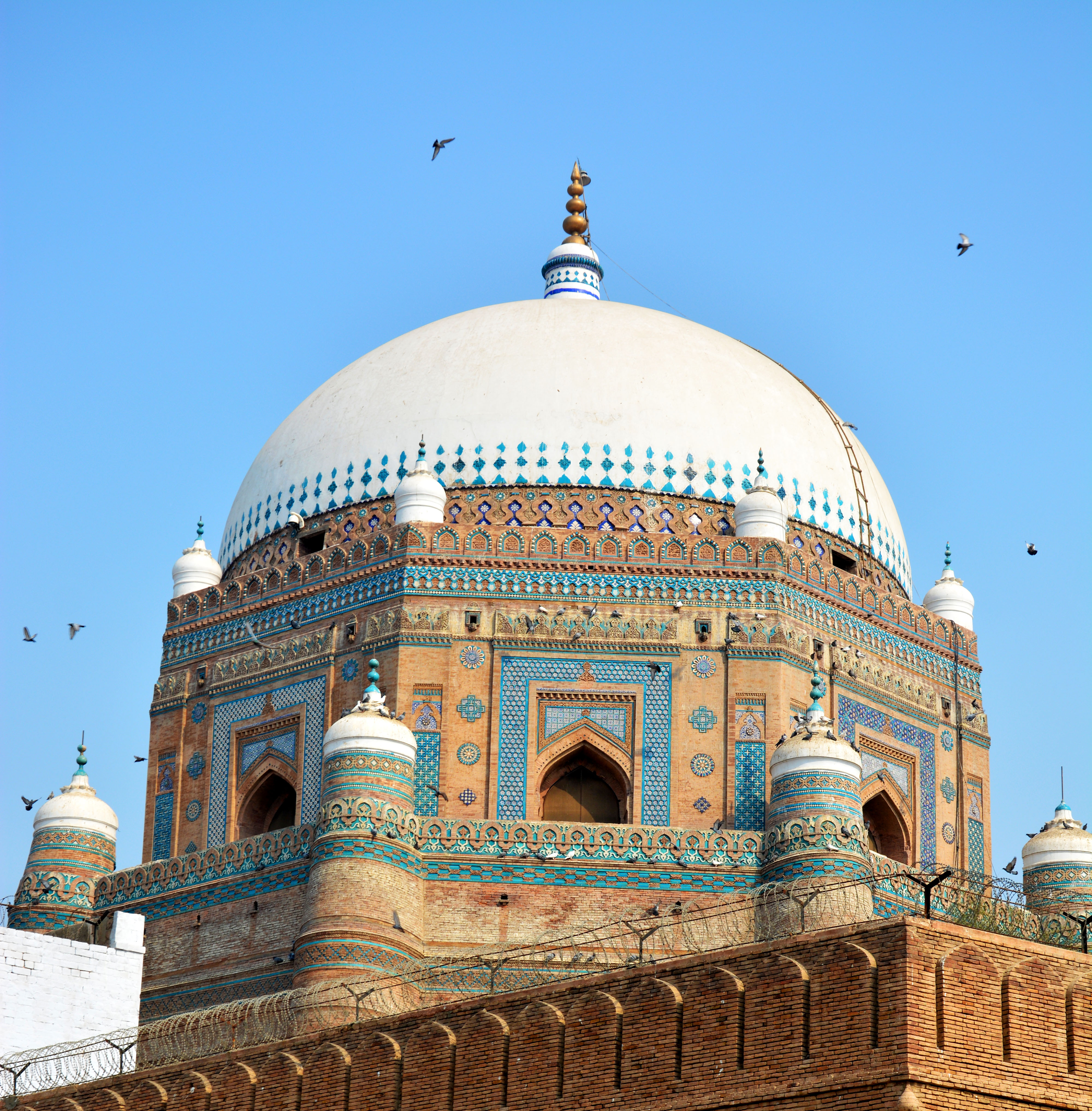
The Tomb of Shah Rukn-e-Alam is part of Pakistan's Sufi heritage.

Four periods are recognised in Pakistani architecture: pre-Islamic, Islamic, colonial, and post-colonial. With the beginning of the Indus Valley Civilization around the middle of the 3rd millennium BCE, an advanced urban culture developed for the first time in the region, with large buildings, some of which survive to this day. Mohenjo Daro, Harappa, and Kot Diji are among the pre-Islamic settlements that are now tourist attractions. The rise of Buddhism and the influence of Greek civilisation led to the development of a Greco-Buddhist style, starting from the 1st century CE. The high point of this era was the Gandhara style. An example of Buddhist architecture is the ruins of the Buddhist monastery Takht-i-Bahi in Khyber Pakhtunkhwa.

The arrival of Islam in what is today Pakistan meant the gradual end of Buddhist architecture in the area and a transition to Islamic architecture. This shift introduced intricate geometric patterns, arabesques, and calligraphy, replacing the Buddhist emphasis on human and animal depictions, which are generally avoided in Islamic art and architecture. The most important building from this era still standing is the tomb of Shah Rukn-i-Alam in Multan. During the Mughal era, design elements of Persian-Islamic architecture became fused with architectural styles native to India, leading to new architectural revival. Lahore, as the occasional residence of Mughal rulers and a once Mughal capital, contains many important buildings from the empire. Most prominent among them are the Badshahi Mosque, the fortress of Lahore with the famous Alamgiri Gate, the colourful, Mughal-style Wazir Khan Mosque, the Shalimar Gardens in Lahore, and the Shahjahan Mosque in Thatta.

In the British colonial period, predominantly functional buildings of the Indo-European style developed from a mixture of European and Mughal architectural traditions. Post-colonial national identity is expressed in modern structures such as the Faisal Mosque, the Minar-e-Pakistan, and the Mazar-e-Quaid. Several examples of architectural infrastructure demonstrating the influence of British design can be found in Lahore, Peshawar, and Karachi.

== Recreation and sports ==
Most sports played in Pakistan originated and were substantially developed by athletes and sports fans from the United Kingdom who introduced them during the British Raj. Field hockey is the national sport of Pakistan; it has won three gold medals in the Olympic Games held in 1960, 1968, and 1984. Pakistan has also won the Hockey World Cup a record four times, held in 1971, 1978, 1982, and 1994.

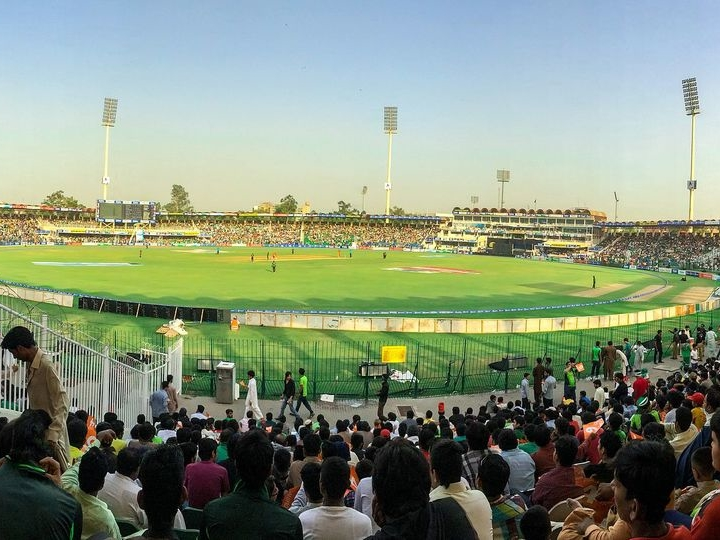
Gaddafi Stadium, Lahore is the third-largest cricket stadium in Pakistan with a seating capacity of 27,000 spectators.

Cricket, however, is the most popular game across the country. The country has had an array of success in the sport over the years, and has the distinct achievement of having won each of the major ICC international cricket tournaments: ICC Cricket World Cup, ICC World Twenty20, and ICC Champions Trophy; as well as the ICC Test Championship. The cricket team (known as Shaheen) won the Cricket World Cup held in 1992; it was runner-up once, in 1999. Pakistan was runner-up in the inaugural World Twenty20 (2007) in South Africa and won the World Twenty20 in England in 2009. In March 2009, militants attacked the touring Sri Lankan cricket team, after which no international cricket was played in Pakistan until May 2015, when the Zimbabwean team agreed to a tour. Pakistan also won the 2017 ICC Champions Trophy by defeating arch-rivals India in the final.

Pakistan Super League is one of the largest cricket leagues of the world with a brand value of about Rs. 32.26 billion (US$120 million).

Association football is the second-most played sport in Pakistan and it is organised and regulated by the Pakistan Football Federation. Football in Pakistan is as old as the country itself. Shortly after the creation of Pakistan in 1947, the Pakistan Football Federation (PFF) was created, and Muhammad Ali Jinnah became its first Patron-in-Chief. The highest football division in Pakistan is the Pakistan Premier League. Pakistan is known as one of the best manufacturers of the official FIFA World Cup ball.

Pakistan has hosted or co-hosted several international sporting events: the 1989 and 2004 South Asian Games; the 1984, 1993, 1996 and 2003 World Squash Championships; the 1987 and 1996 Cricket World Cup; co-hosted the ICC Champion Trophy 2025 and the 1990 Hockey World Cup. Pakistan is set to host the 2025 South Asian Games.

There are also some traditional games of Pakistan, such as kabaddi, which are popular.

== Cuisine ==
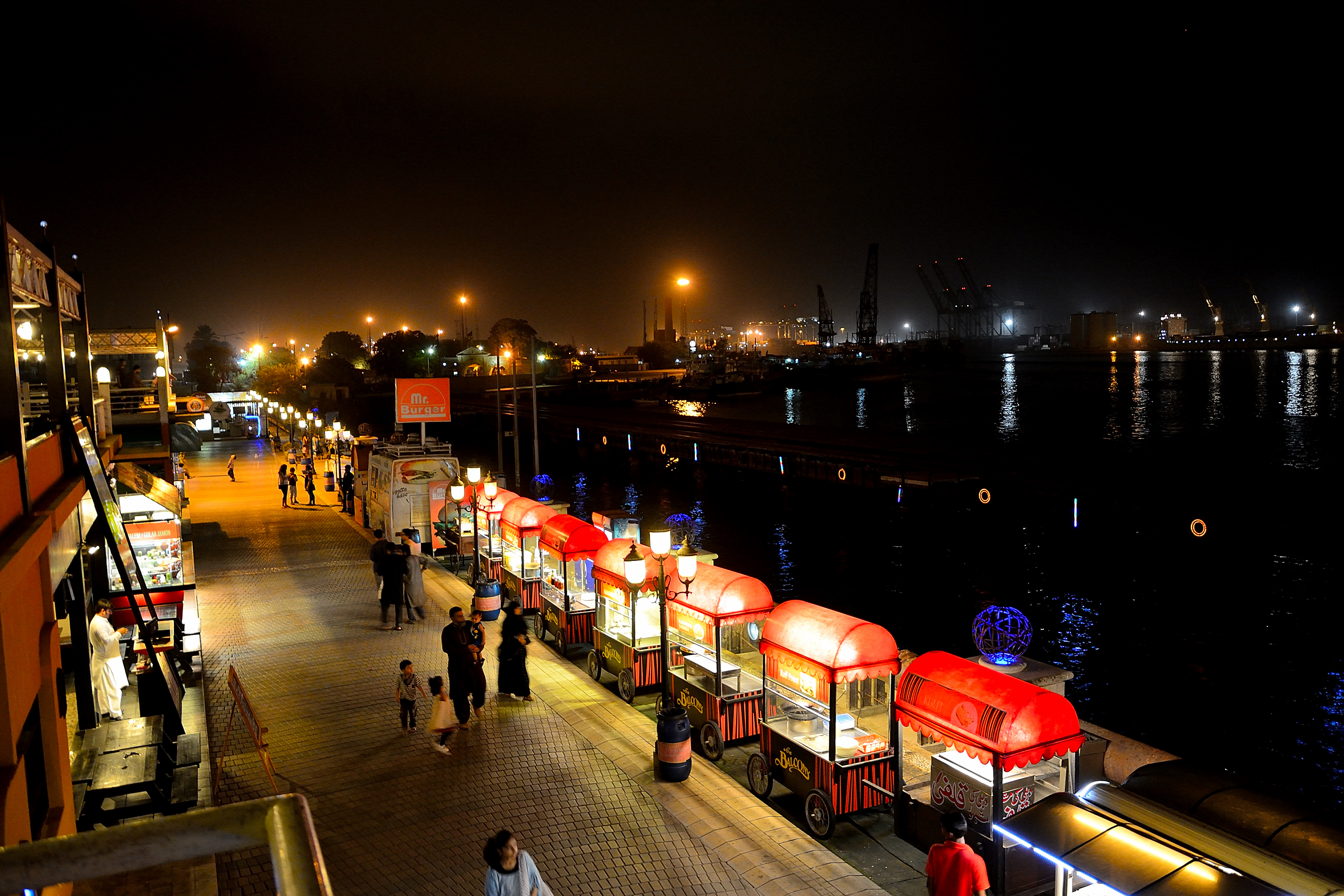
Located on the bank of Arabian Sea in Karachi, Port Grand is one of the largest food streets of Asia.

Pakistani cuisine lies at the crossroads of Central Asian, Middle Eastern, North Indian, and Iranian culinary traditions, with some practices, such as the use of nuts in garnishing, tracing back to the royal kitchens of the 16th-century Mughal emperors.

The level of spice is typically low in most traditional cuisines, such as those of Pashtun, Balochi, Gilgiti, Balti, Sindhi, and southern and northern Punjab. However, in Central and Eastern Punjab, as well as in the cuisine of the Muhajir community—Indian immigrants primarily settled in Karachi, the country's financial hub—the food is often spicy. Muhajir cuisine, in particular, incorporates generous quantities of garlic, ginger, turmeric, red chili, and garam masala.

Meals commonly include rice, often prepared with meat but also with vegetables, or bread such as naan or roti, served with broth, meat, vegetables, or lentils. Traditionally, meals are served on a dastarkhān—a special rug lined with a plastic sheet to prevent spills and surrounded by cushions or pillows for added comfort. In modern households, however, the use of dining tables has become increasingly common.

Culinary trends have been more prevalent in Pakistani cuisine in recent years, especially in metropolitan areas. Alongside traditional dishes, other cuisines including Turkish, Arabic, Korean, Chinese, and Italian have grown in popularity. In places like Karachi, Lahore, and Islamabad, café culture has also grown quickly, bringing specialty coffee, gourmet burgers, brunch culture, and modern desserts into the mainstream of eating. Particularly among younger generations, social networking and meal delivery services have further influenced shifting culinary tastes.

=== Pakistani tea culture ===
Chai is tea in Pakistan, which can either be green or black. It is consumed at all times, especially a short time after finishing a meal or with guests during any social gathering. Most people drink green tea with no sugar. Some add cardamom, saffron, or sugar. Both black (with milk) teas are popular and there are different varieties common in different parts of Pakistan. The consumption of tea in Pakistan, called chai (چائے) is of central significance to Pakistani culture. It is one of the most consumed beverages in Pakistani cuisine. Pakistan produces its own limited tea in Shinkiari farms; however, it ranks as the third largest importer of tea in the world. In 2003, as much as 109,000 tonnes of tea were consumed in Pakistan, ranking it at seven on the list of tea-consuming countries in the world.

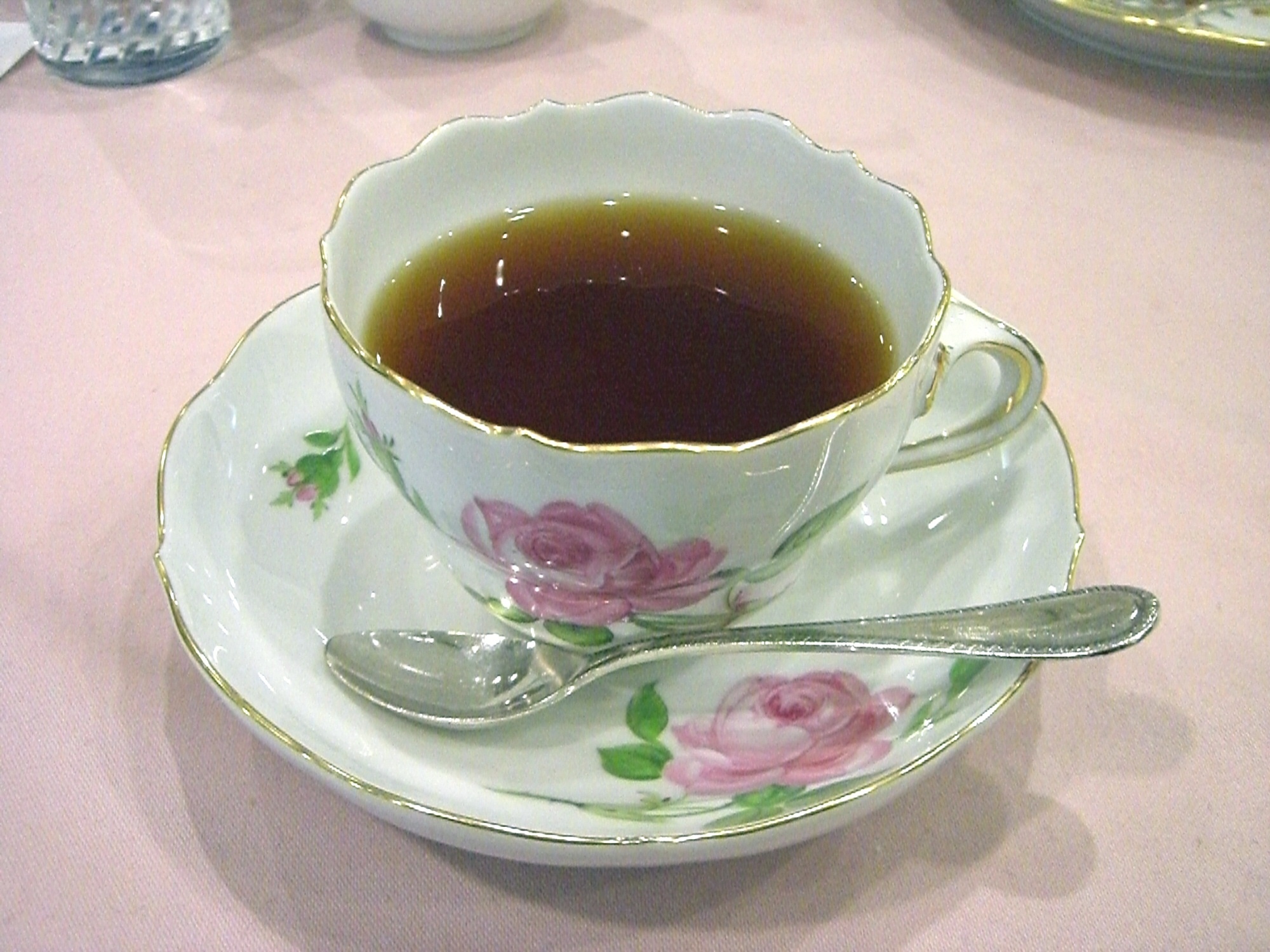
A traditional cup of black tea

- The name for Three Cups of Tea, a bestselling 2007 book by American mountaineer and educator Greg Mortenson, is taken from the Balti proverb in northern Pakistan: "The first time you share tea with a Balti, you are a stranger. The second time you take tea, you are an honored guest. The third time you share a cup of tea, you become family..."
- The British documentary film Tracing Tea briefly covers tea culture in Pakistan.
- Pak Tea House – a tea cafe in Lahore famously known for being visited by prominent academic intellectuals and literary personalities from all walks of life.

== Popular media ==
The private print media, state-owned Pakistan Television Corporation (PTV), and Pakistan Broadcasting Corporation (PBC) for radio were the dominant media outlets until the beginning of the 21st century. Pakistan now has a large network of domestic, privately owned 24-hour news media and television channels. A 2016 report by the Reporters Without Borders ranked Pakistan 147th on the Press Freedom Index, while at the same time terming the Pakistani media "among the freest in Asia when it comes to covering the squabbling among politicians." The BBC terms the Pakistani media "among the most outspoken in South Asia". Pakistani media has also played a vital role in exposing corruption.

The Lollywood, Punjabi and Pashto film industry is based in Lahore and Peshawar. While Bollywood films were banned from public cinemas from 1965 until 2008, they have remained an important part of popular culture. In contrast to the ailing Pakistani film industry, Urdu televised dramas and theatrical performances continue to be popular, as many entertainment media outlets air them regularly. Urdu dramas dominate the television entertainment industry, which has launched critically acclaimed miniseries and featured popular actors and actresses since the 1990s. In the 1960s–1970s, pop music and disco (1970s) dominated the country's music industry. In the 1980s–1990s, British influenced rock music appeared and jolted the country's entertainment industry. In the 2000s, heavy metal music gained popular and critical acclaim.

== National dress ==
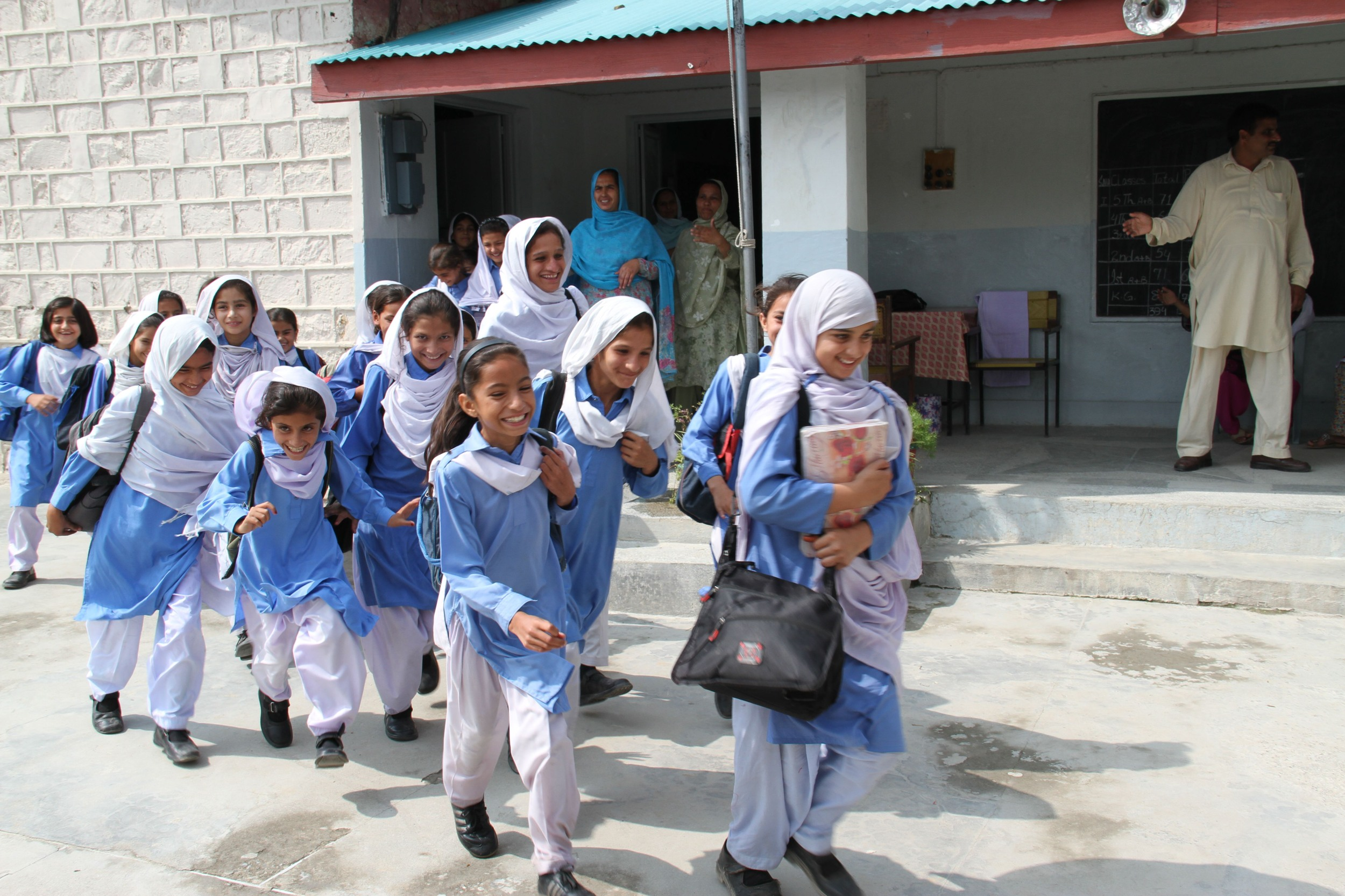
Schoolgirls in Abbottabad, Khyber Pakhtunkhwa, Pakistan, in shalwars with cuffed hems, and kameez with western-style collars.

The national dress of Pakistan is the Persian origin shalwar kameez, a unisex garment widely-worn around South Asia, and national dress, of Pakistan. When women wear the shalwar-kameez in some regions, they usually wear a long scarf or shawl called a dupatta around the head or neck. The dupatta is also employed as a form of modesty—although it is made of delicate material, it obscures the upper body's contours by passing over the shoulders. For Muslim women, the dupatta is a less stringent alternative to the chador or burqa (see hijab and purdah). Besides the national dress, domestically tailored suits and neckties are often worn by men, and are customary in offices, schools, and social gatherings.

The fashion industry has flourished in the changing environment of the fashion world. Since Pakistan came into being, its fashion has evolved in different phases and developed a unique identity. Today, Pakistani fashion is a combination of traditional and modern dress and has become a mark of Pakistani culture. Despite modern trends, regional and traditional forms of dress have developed their own significance as a symbol of native tradition. This regional fashion continues to evolve into both more modern and purer forms. The Pakistan Fashion Design Council based in Lahore organizes PFDC Fashion Week and the Fashion Pakistan Council based in Karachi organizes Fashion Pakistan Week. Pakistan's first fashion week was held in November 2009.

== See also ==
- History of Pakistan
- Punjabis
- Pashtuns
- Sindhis
- Baloch people
- Brahui people
- Kashmiris
- Balti people
- Sintashta culture
- Muhajir culture
