= Etiquette in Pakistan =

In Pakistan, etiquette, or the code of social behavior that governs human interactions, is largely derived from Islam and focuses on the values commanded by the religion, and has its own cultural etiquette based mainly on South Asian influences.

== Introduction and greeting ==
- In contemporary times, the unit-family system is commonly observed, although references to the combined-family system are also prevalent. In this structure, elders are typically esteemed and receive affection and respect from younger individuals, including those who may be unfamiliar to them and encounter one another for the first time in various circumstances.
- Visitors are esteemed and treated with respect, and with a sense of connection among relatives, colleagues, friends, and neighbors. It is customary for guests to notify their hosts in advance of their arrival, allowing for minimal disruption to the host's routine.
- In formal contexts, it was previously considered rude to introduce yourself to strangers, and therefore generally advisable to ask some mutual acquaintance to introduce you. Strangers will speak with each other in the "formal" register of Urdu, and using the familiar register will be seen as very rude. However, this is not the case in everyday life.

In urban Sindh and other parts of the country, men and women usually lower their heads and lift their hands to their forehead to make the "adab" gesture when greeting each other. Although, the Islamic greeting, "As-salamu alaykum" is generally used in the country, which means 'Peace be upon you'.

- When being introduced to elders or strangers while seated it is customary to get up as a sign of respect.
- It is advisable to ask a person how they wish to be addressed.
  - In Pakistani culture, there is a prevalent affection towards children. It is commonly regarded as impolite and disrespectful to not engage with children, regardless of their age.
  - Pakistanis generally speak in a very roundabout way, often using many similes and metaphors, and it is fairly common for passages from poems to be recited or cited during conversions.
  - It is inadvisable to bring alcohol as a gift to any Pakistani home (As Islam is the dominant religion in the country and it prohibits any mind-altering and intoxicating substances).
  - It is recommended to avoid discussing subjects such as sex and intimacy as these are considered to be taboo.
  - Most Pakistanis are not accepting of homosexuality, and it is generally considered a taboo in the country.
  - Arranged marriages are a common practice in Pakistan. Suitable spouses are chosen by the elders of the family by taking into consideration the other family's financial and social standing.

== Meeting etiquette of man and woman ==
- Previously, casual dating was considered inappropriate, and people of the opposite gender seen together in public were sometimes subject to judgement. Even today, dating is thought to bring 'shame and dishonor' to the family in conservative societies of the country. However many societies in the cities such as, Karachi, Islamabad, and Lahore, are more relaxed in this matter. Many Pakistanis even encourage dating if the boy and girl are meeting each other within the boundaries and values that are considered compatible with the culture and are serious about marriage and settling together in future.
- Pre-marital intimate relations are widely considered taboo and are not generally accepted in Pakistani society. Islam, the predominant religion in the country, upholds the sanctity of the family institution and marital relations as sacred. Within Islamic teachings, fornication and adultery are viewed as challenges to the preservation of the family unit. This is why dating in the country is also used as a means to establish marriage and the family unit, rather than any form of premarital intimacy.
- In many areas, people of the opposite sex do not usually shake hands, and interact only to talk, although this rule is more relaxed if one of the participants is an elder or a close relative. However, this type of gender-segregation is not common in the metropolitan cities, such as Islamabad, Lahore, and Muhajir-dominated (Urdu-speaking) areas of Karachi.
- Islamabad Capital Territory, Lahore, and many metropolitan areas in Karachi are relatively liberal, whereas the provinces of Khyber Pakhtunkhwa and Balochistan are more conservative and prefer to keep up with their cultural traditions wholeheartedly.
- Lahore, Islamabad and Muhajir-dominated areas of Karachi are also liberal in terms of female clothing, this means that women in these areas can reveal their hair, forearms, etc. and can wear shirts, tops, jeans or trousers that are covering and are not revealing or tight. Wearing outfits like, short-skirts or revealing tops are not considered appropriate in any area of Pakistan. Even at beaches in Karachi, women fold the hems of their trousers, shalwars, or jeans up to just below the knees (so that only their feet and shins are revealed and not above than that) when they go in the water for wading or standing. No one usually swims at public beaches, however when swimming in water parks, post-pubescent women often wears burkini or other modest swimsuits that are at least covering from shoulders to the knees, and men can swim shirtless, with clothing that perfectly covers the private parts and the areas adjoining the private parts.

== Etiquette in a business environment ==
- English is widely spoken and understood in major cities. The local dialect is called Pakistani English.
- It is generally recommended not to schedule meetings during Ramadan. The workday is shortened, and since Muslims fast, they will not be able to offer tea, which is a sign of hospitality in Pakistan.
- Meetings are not scheduled at prayer time.

== See also ==
- History of Pakistan
- Pakistani cuisine
