= Ijtihad =

Islamic legal term referring to independent reasoning

Ijtihad (/ˌɪdʒtəˈhɑːd/ IJ-tə-HAHD; Arabic: اجتهاد ijtihād [ʔidʒ.tihaːd], lit. 'physical effort' or 'mental effort') is an Islamic legal term referring to independent reasoning by an expert in Islamic law, or the thorough exertion of a jurist's mental faculty in finding a solution to a legal question. It is contrasted with taqlid (imitation, conformity to legal precedent). According to classical Sunni theory, ijtihad requires expertise in the Arabic language, theology, revealed texts, and principles of jurisprudence (usul al-fiqh), and is not employed where authentic and authoritative texts (Qur'an and hadith) are considered unambiguous with regard to the question, or where there is an existing scholarly consensus (ijma). Ijtihad is considered to be a religious duty for those qualified to perform it. An Islamic scholar who is qualified to perform ijtihad is called a "mujtahid".

For the first five centuries of Islam, the practice of ijtihad continued in theory and practice among Sunni Muslims. It then first became subject to dispute in the 12th century. By the 14th century, development of classic Islamic jurisprudence or fiqh prompted leading Sunni jurists to state that the main legal questions in Islam had been addressed, and to call for the scope of ijtihad to be restricted. In the modern era, this gave rise to a perception amongst Orientalist scholars and sections of the Muslim public that the so-called "gate of ijtihad" was closed at the start of the classical era. While recent scholarship established that the practice of Ijtihad had never ceased in Islamic history, the extent and mechanisms of legal change in the post-formative period remain a subject of debate. Differences amongst the Fuqaha (jurists) prevented Sunni Muslims from reaching any consensus (Ijma) on the issues of continuity of Ijtihad and existence of Mujtahids. Thus, Ijtihad remained a key aspect of Islamic jurisprudence throughout the centuries. Ijtihad was practiced throughout the Early modern period and claims for ijtihad and its superiority over taqlid were voiced unremittingly.

Starting from the 18th century, Islamic reformers began calling for abandonment of taqlid and emphasis on ijtihad, which they saw as a return to Islamic origins. Public debates in the Muslim world surrounding ijtihad continue to the present day. The advocacy of ijtihad has been particularly associated with the Salafiyya and modernist movements. Among contemporary Muslims in the West there have emerged new visions of ijtihad which emphasize substantive moral values over traditional juridical methodology.

Shia jurists did not use the term ijtihad until the 12th century. With the exception of Zaydi jurisprudence, the early Imami Shia were unanimous in censuring Ijtihad in the field of law (Ahkam). After the Shiite embrace of various doctrines of Mu'tazila and classical Sunnite Fiqh (jurisprudence), this led to a change. After the victory of the Usulis who based law on principles (usul) over the Akhbaris ("traditionalists") who emphasized on reports or traditions (khabar) by the 19th century, Ijtihad would become a mainstream Shia practice.

== Etymology and definition ==
The word derives from the three-letter Arabic verbal root of ج-ه-د J-H-D (jahada, 'struggle'): the "t" is inserted because the word is a derived stem VIII verb. In its literal meaning, the word refers to effort, physical or mental, expended in a particular activity. In its technical sense, ijtihad can be defined as a "process of legal reasoning and hermeneutics through which the jurist-mujtahid derives or rationalizes law on the basis of the Qur'an and the Sunna".

The juristic meaning of ijtihād has several definitions according to scholars of Islamic legal theory. Some define it as the jurist's action and activity to reach a solution. Al-Ghazālī (d. 505/1111) defines it as the "total expenditure of effort made by a jurist for the purpose of obtaining the religious rulings." Similarly the ijtihād is defined as "the effort made by the mujtahid in seeking knowledge of the aḥkām (rulings) of the sharī'ah (Islamic canonical law) through interpretation."

From this point of view that ijtihād essentially consists of an inference (istinbāṭ) that extents to a probability (ẓann). Thus it excludes the extraction of a ruling from a clear text as well as rulings made without recourse to independent legal reasoning. A knowledgeable person who gives a ruling on the sharī'ah, but is not able to exercise their judgement in the inference of the rulings from the sources, is not called a mujtahid but rather a muqallid.

== Scriptural basis ==
Islamic scholar Asghar Ali Engineer cites a hadith related by a sahabi (companion of the Islamic prophet Muhammad) by the name of Muadh ibn Jabal (also Ma'adh bin Jabal), as the basis for ijtihad. According to the hadith from Sunan Abu-Dawud, Book 24, Muadh was appointed by Muhammad to go to Yemen. Before leaving he was asked how he would judge when the occasion of deciding a case arose.

Ma'adh said, according to the Quran. The Prophet thereupon asked what he would do if he did not find the solution to the problem in the Quran, to which Ma'adh said he would govern according to the Sunnah. But when the Prophet asked if he could not find it in the Sunnah also, Ma'adh said "ana ajtahidu" (I will exert myself to find the solution). The Prophet thereupon patted his back and told him he was right.

== History ==
=== Formative period ===
During the early period, ijtihad referred to the exertion of mental energy to arrive at a legal opinion (ra'y) on the basis of the knowledge of the Divine Revelation. Jurists used Ijtihad to help reach legal rulings, in cases where the Qur'an and Sunna did not provide clear direction for certain decisions. It was the duty of the educated jurists to come to a ruling that would be in the best interest of the Muslim community and promote the public good.

As religious law continued to develop over time, ra'y became insufficient in making sure that fair legal rulings were being derived in keeping with both the Qur'an and Sunna. However, during this time, the meaning and process of ijtihad became more clearly constructed. Ijtihad was "limited to a systematic method of interpreting the law on the basis of authoritative texts, the Quran and Sunna".

As the practice of ijtihad transformed over time, it became religious duty of a mujtahid to conduct legal rulings for the Muslim society. Mujtahid is defined as a Muslim scholar that has met certain requirements including a strong knowledge of the Qur'an, Sunna, and Arabic, as well as a deep understanding of legal theory and the precedent; all of which allows them to be considered fully qualified to practice ijtihad.

=== Classical era ===
==== Origins of the controversy ====
The controversy over the existence of Mujtahids began in its nascent form during the sixth/12th century. The fifth-century Hanbali jurist Ibn 'Aqil (1040–1119) responding to a Hanafi jurist's statement, advocated for the necessity of existence of Mujtahids using scripture and reasoning. A century later, Shafi'i jurist Al-Amidi would counter the premise of Hanbalis and prominent Shafīʿis arguing that extinction of Mujtahids is possible. Over the centuries, the controversy would garner more attention with the scholars gathering around 3 camps: 1) Hanbalis and majority of Shafīʿis who denied the theoretical possibility of Mujtahid's extinction 2) a group of jurists who asserted that extinction of Mujtahids is possible but not proven 3) a group who advocated the extinction of Mujtahids.

To validate their points, the scholars of Taqlid camp cited Prophetic hadiths that report the disappearance of knowledge when ignorant leaders "will give judgements" and misguide others. Muqallids also argued that Ijtihad isn't a communal obligation (fard kifaya) when it is possible to blindly imitate the laws of ancestors received through transmitted chains of narrations. Hanbalis, the staunch advocates of permanent existence of Mujtahids, countered by citing Prophetic reports which validated their view that knowledge and sound judgement would accompany the Muslim Ummah led by Mujtahid scholars until the Day of Judgment, thus giving theological implications to the controversy. They also raised the question of leadership and interpretive religious authority to vigorously deny the possibility of an age without Mujtahids, a doctrine which they defended using both Scripultural and rational arguments. Citing Prophetic traditions such as "scholars are the heirs of the prophets", Hanbalis settled on the belief that God would not leave any age without a proper guide, i.e., Islamic Fuqaha (jurists) who solve novel issues through Ijtihad.

The majority of Shafīʿi scholars were also leading advocates of Ijtihad as a fard kifaya (communal obligation). The prominent 16th century Shafi'i legal treatise Fath-ul-Mueen affirmed the existence of Mujtahids and obligated them to take the post of Qadi as fard kifaya. Leading Shafīʿi jurist Al-Suyuti (1445-1505) also stipulated Ijtihad as a communal obligation, the abandonment of which would be sinful upon the whole Ummah. Shafīʿis also upheld the popular Muslim tradition of appearance of Mujaddids who would renew the religion every century. As promoters of the idea of Mujaddids; (who were assumed as Mujtahids) majority of jurists who claimed Tajdid or honoured as Mujaddids were Shafīʿis. On the other hand, some prominent Shafīʿi jurists like Al-Rafi'i (d. 623 AH) had made statements speculating an "agreement" on the absence of Mujtahid Mutlaqs (highest-ranking Mujtahid) during his era, while few others affirmed the theoretical possibility of the absence of Mujtahids. However, such statements had ambiguities in legal terminology and didn't stipulate an established consensus on the issue. In addition, Rafi'i himself was considered as a Mujtahid and a Mujaddid.

Yahya ibn Sharaf al-Nawawi (d. 676/1277), a prominent Shafī'i Muhaddith and Jurist, who is a primary reference even for Shafiites of the Taqleed camp; advocated that it isn't obligatory for laymen to adhere to a mad'hab, reinforcing the orthodox Shafī'ite pro-Ijtihad position. Other prominent classical Shafī'i jurists who advocated the pro-Ijtihad position included Taj ud Din al Subki, Dhahabi, Izz ud Deen Ibn Abdussalam, Ibn al Salah, Al Bulqini, etc. Taj ud Din al Subki (d. 1370 CE) summed up the classical-era Shafi'i position in his Kitāb Mu'īd an-Ni'am wa-Mubīd an-Niqām:

"It is unacceptable to Allah, the forcing of people to accept one madhab and the associated partisanship (tahazzub) in the subsidiary issues of the Din and nothing pushes this fervour and zealously except partisanship and jealousy. If Abu Haneefah, Shafi, Malik and Ahmad were alive they would severely censure these people and they would disassociate themselves from them."

==== Emergence of the "closure of the gates" notion ====
In contrast to the view of these Shafiites, classical Shafi'ite theologian 'Abd al-Malik al-Juwayni (d. 1085 C.E/ 478 A.H) postulated a new doctrine on the controversy of the existence of Mujtahids. Juwaynī and his Shāfiʿī colleagues insisted that not only was the disappearance of Mujtahids was possible, but that it had already happened. Juwayni's doctrine was taken by his student Ghazālī (d. 1111 C.E/ 505 A.H), al-Qaffāl al-Shāshī (d. 1113 C.E/507 A.H) and promoted in the next century by the Shafi'i scholars Fakhr al-Dīn al-Rāzī (d. 606/1209), Sayf al-Dīn al-Āmidī (d. 631/1233), and Rāfiʿī (d. 623/1226). These scholars asserted the belief that Mujtahids had already disappeared, and some would claim a consensus on this point. Thereafter, the theory of legal minimalism elucidated by Juwayni in his book Ghiyāth al-umam fī iltiyāth al zulam, penned for his Seljuk patron Nizam ul-Mulk, would be popularised. This system listed a set of core principles that implemented legal and procedural minimalism; and attempted the standardisation of Islamic courts and legal framework in the medieval Muslim World.

Most significantly, the influential Islamic theologian Al Ghazzali introduced the notion of closure of Ijtihad since he viewed numerous people with inadequate knowledge of Qur'an as claiming to be Mujtahids. Owing to his status as a great scholar, numerous ulema followed his call; even though many continued to dispute it. Intellectuals like Hasan Hanafi argue that Ghazali had tried to preclude the endeavour of Ijtihad during his era in order to establish a rigid, stable orthodoxy that could effectively challenge external enemies of Islam like the Crusaders. According to C.A Qadir, Ghazzali's efforts had tremendous impact on limiting the scope of Ijtihad in medieval Islamic orthodxy.

However, there is still a vigorous scholarly debate regarding whether Al-Ghazali had himself "closed the gates" or whether he merely continued an established policy of his scholarly predecessors or whether the gate was ever closed. According to James P. Piscatori, the provision for Ijtihad in Sunni Fiqh was never "tightly shut" and remained open to some extent. During the 16th century, majority of the clerical classes would claim Ghazzali's doctrine as sacrosanct and inviolable by Ijma (consensus). Post-classical era, a large part of Shafīʿi scholarship would also shift to a pro-Taqleed position owing to external influence from Hanafite-Malikite Muqallid camps. Most noteworthy amongst them were Ibn Hajar al-Haytami (d. 1566). However many still defended Ijtihad while others who theoretically affirmed the disappearance of Mujtahids rejected the claim that they did in reality.

==== Late classical period ====
Until the end of the 14th century, no voice had before actively risen to condemn the claims of mujtahids to practice ijtihad within their schools. However, the doctrine of Taqlid was steadily amassing support amongst the masses. The first incident in which muqallids openly attacked the claims of mujtahids occurred in Egypt, during the lifetime of Suyuti. Suyuti had claimed to practice the highest degree of Ijtihad within the Shafi'i school. He advocated that Ijtihad is a backbone of Sharia and believed in the continuous existence of Mujtahids.

Around the 15th century, most Sunni jurists argued that all major matters of religious law had been settled, allowing for taqlid (تقليد), "the established legal precedents and traditions," to take priority over ijtihād (اجتهاد). This move away from the practice of ijtihād was primarily made by the scholars of Hanafī and Malikī schools, and a number of Shafīʿis, but not by Hanbalīs and majority of Shafīʿi jurists who believed that "true consensus" (ijmāʿ اجماع), apart from that of Muhammad's Companions, did not exist" and that "the constant continuous existence of mujtahids (مجتهد) was a theological requirement." Although the Ottoman clergy denied Ijtihad in theory, throughout the 16th and 17th centuries, the Ottoman Hanafite ulema had practiced Ijtihad to solve a number of new legal issues. Various legal rulings were formulated on a number of issues, such as the Waqf of movables, on drugs, coffee, music, tobacco, etc. However to support the official doctrine of "extinction of Mujtahids", the Ottoman ulema denied Ijtihad even when it was practiced.

The increasing prominence of taqlid had at one point led most Western scholars to believe that the "gate of ijtihad" was in fact effectively closed around the tenth century. In a 1964 monograph, which exercised considerable influence on later scholars, Joseph Schacht wrote that "a consensus gradually established itself to the effect that from that time onwards no one could be deemed to have the necessary qualifications for independent reasoning in religious law, and that all future activity would have to be confined to the explanation, application, and, at the most, interpretation of the doctrine as it had been laid down once and for all." (Note: The mid-twentieth century European authority on Islamic law Joseph Schacht, said that [...] Since the 1990s, a large and growing body of research has demonstrated the continuing creativity and dynamism of Islamic legal thinking in the post-formative period, as well as probed the lively dialectic between legal rulings and social practice. While it is no longer possible to assert that "the door of ijtihad was closed" after the tenth (or, indeed, any other) century, however, there is still lively debate over the extent of legal change and the mechanisms by which it occurred.)

While more recent research is said to have disproven the notion that the practice of ijtihad was abandoned in the tenth century — or even later in the 15th century — the extent of legal change during this period and its mechanisms remain a subject of scholarly debate. The Ijtihad camp primarily consisted of Hanbalis and Shafiites, while the Taqlid camp were primarily Hanafites who were supported to a greater or lesser extent by Malikis as well as some Shafi'is.

=== Ranking of Mujtahids ===
After the 11th century, Sunni legal theory developed systems for ranking jurists according to their qualifications for ijtihad. One such ranking placed the founders of maddhabs, who were credited with being "absolute mujtahids" (mujtahid muṭlaq) capable of methodological innovation, at the top, and jurists capable only of taqlīd at the bottom, with mujtahids and those who combined ijtihād and taqlīd given the middle ranks. (Note: After the eleventh century, Sunnī legal literature developed rankings of jurists according to their ability to practice ijtihād. One predominant classification credited the founders of the legal schools with the distinction of being absolute mujtahids (mujtahid muṭlaq) who were capable of laying down a methodology of the law and of deriving from it the positive doctrines that were to dominate their respective schools. Accordingly, each legal school represented a different methodology for ijtihād. Next came the mujtahids who operated within each school (mujtahid muntasim or mujtahid fī al-madhhab), who followed the methodology of the school's founder but proffered new solutions for novel legal cases. The lowest rank belonged to the muqallid, the jurist-imitator who merely followed the rulings arrived at by the mujtāhids without understanding the processes by which these rulings were derived. Between the ranks of mujtahids and muqallids there were distinguished other levels of jurists who combined ijtihād with taqlīd. [...] The settling of the major areas of Islamic law gave rise to the perception, prevalent among many modern Western scholars and Sunnī lay Muslims, that jurists had come to a consensus that the so-called "gate of ijtihād" (باب الاجتهاد bāb al-ijtihād) was closed at the beginning of the tenth century.) In the 11th century, jurists required a mufti (jurisconsult) to be a mujtahid; by the middle of the 13th century, however, most scholars considered a muqallid (practitioner of taqlīd) to be qualified for the role. During that era some jurists began to ponder whether practitioners of ijtihad continued to exist and the phrase "closing of the gate of ijtihād" (إغلاق باب الاجتهاد iġlāq bāb al-ijtihād) appeared after the 16th century. (Note: In the eleventh century, jurists defined a jurisconsult as being a mujtahid (i.e., one who has the ability to independently reason; the highest rank of a jurist). By the middle of the thirteenth century, however, it appears that the prerequisites were lowered, and jurisconsults were expected – by most, but not all scholars – to be muqallids (i.e., able to articulate a legal opinion based on the precedents and methodology of a particular legal school; a lower rank than mujtahid).)

However, these rankings have been criticized for their arbitrariness. Many other distinguished scholars have been recorded by scholars as Mujtahid Mutlaqs even after the deaths of four Imams (to whom the four schools are attributed). Also, various schools were subject to transformation and evolution through time in ways that their founders had not imagined. The founders themselves had not stipulated many such rankings or classifications. Nor did they obligate strict adherence to a particular scholar or legal theory. In many cases, major parts of the legal theory were in fact developed by the later followers.

The classical Hanbali theologian Taqi al-Din Ibn Taymiyya (d. 1328 C.E/ 728 A.H) was a notable figure who dissented from the prevalent Madh'hab-based ranking standardisations and classifications. Arguing that the practice of Ijtihad is allowed for every Muslim, Ibn Taymiyya writes:

"...doors of ijtihād are open even to laymen, who are permitted to practice ijtihād without fear of punishment: the muftī, the soldier and the layman. If they speak according to their ijtihād ..., intending to follow the Messenger to the extent of their knowledge, they do not deserve punishment; this is so by the consensus of the Muslims, even if they have erred in a matter for which consensus already exists."

Legal schools(mad'habs) had begun to take shape by the middle of the fourth/tenth century and practice of affiliating to the madhabs began to become popular. Systematic categorisation of Mujtahids emerged during late fifth/eleventh century into ranks of excellence. By doing so, they sought to facilitate the Ijtihad of qualified Muftis. The earliest known typology of jurists is Ibn Rushd's (d. 520/1126) tripartite classification of Muftis. In this typology, the top-Mufti was a Mujtahid (like Ibn Rushd himself) while the latter two ranks weren't, i.e., a Mujtahid must independently reason on the basis of Scriptures and general principles of the school. On the other hand, Ghazzali distinguished between two ranks of Mujtahids, the independent(Mutlaq) and the affiliated(Muqayyad) in a three-rank classification. In the seventh century, Shafi'i jurist Ibn al-Salah (d. 643/1245) would elaborate a five rank classification of Muftis. During the 10th/16th century, Ottoman Shaykh al-Islam Ammad Ibn Kamal (d. 940/1533) articulated a Hanafite typology of jurists with seven ranks. Unlike the previous typologies, the latter classification was promoted by Taqlid partisans who advocated that Mujtahids ceased to exist. All these classifications created an archetype of an ideal standard to which all other typologies must conform, i.e., the founders of 4 schools. However, this typological conception of the founder Mujtahid suffered from chronological ruptures, overlooking in the process the founder's predecessors as well as his immediate intellectual history that formed a continuity. Although the founder imams were accomplished jurists, they were not as absolute and as categorical as they were portrayed to be, starting from the 5th/11th century. Ibn Kamal's seven-rank typology, in particular, would come under scathing criticism by other Hanafites as well, such as Muhammad Bakhit al-Muti'i (1854 or 1856 — 1935), who was the Grand Mufti of Al-Azhar.

Many Islamic reformers, starting from the 18th century would criticize these classifications altogether, since these classifications assumed every Mufti in terms of leaders and followers, affiliated to the founder imams and succeeding generations who are progressively inferior to knowledge of imams. Faithful to the tenets of Ibn Taymiyya and Muhammad Ibn 'Abd al-Wahhab (1792 C.E/ 1206 A.H), the Wahhabi movement called for Ijtihad and opposed Taqlid. Advocating the Wahhabi stance on Ijtihad, 'Abd al-Rahman ibn Hasan Aal-Al Shaykh (1196-1285 A.H / 1782-1868 C.E), influential Qadi of the Emirate of Nejd, asserts:

".. when a scholar does his best to come to a right decision or verdict concerning a certain matter, if his verdict is right, he will get a double reward, and even if his verdict is wrong, he will still get a reward.... one who prefers the verdict of a scholar to the authorized proof, is to be severely rebuked. It is not permissible to imitate other scholars save in matters of ljithad," which do not contain a proof from the Glorious Qur'an or the Prophetic Sunnah. This is what is called by scholars, "There should be no denial in matters of ljtihad." But, as for those who disagree with this or act otherwise, they should be rebuked and blamed.., this issue has gained the consensus of all scholars, as stated by lmam Ash-Shafi'i."

The 18th-century Islamic reformer and top-most Qadi of Yemen, Al-Shawkani (1759-1839) totally rejected the theory of classification of Mujtahids. According to him, there is only one form of Ijtihad which can be practiced by anybody possessing sufficient knowledge. Shawkani maintains that it is sufficient for a scholar to study one compendium in each of the five disciplines to practice Ijtihad. According to Shawkani, the Muqallids who propagate the closure of Ijtihad and argue that only the four Imams can understand Qur'an and Sunnah are guilty of:

"(telling lies) about Allah and accuse Him of being not capable of creating people that understand what is His law for them and how they must worship Him. They make it appear as if what he has enacted for them through His Book and His Messenger, is not an absolute but a temporary law, restricted to the period before the rise of the madhhabs. After their appearance, there was no Book and no Sunnah anymore [if these people are to be believed], but there emerged persons that enacted a new law and invented another religion..., by their personal opinions and sentiment."

This view would influence many 19th and 20th century Salafi reform movements.

=== Modern era ===
During the turn of the 16th to 17th century, Sunni Muslim reformers began to criticize taqlid, and promoted greater use of ijtihad in legal matters. They claimed that instead of looking solely to previous generations for practices developed by religious scholars, there should be an established doctrine and rule of behavior through the interpretation of original foundational texts of Islam—the Qur'an and Sunna.

During the 18th century, Islamic revivalists increasingly condemned the Muqallid camp through a mass of writings explaining the evils of Taqlid and advocating Ijtihad as well as defending its status as a Divinely established principle in sharia. This would often result in violence between their followers. Most prominent amongst them were Shah Waliullah Dehlawi, Muhammad ibn Abd al-Wahhab, Shawkani, Muhammad ibn Isma'il Al-San'aani, Ibn Mu'ammar, Ahmad ibn Idris al-Fasi, Uthman Ibn Fudio, Muhammad ibn Ali al-Sanusi, etc.

Shah Waliullah Dehlawi was an ardent advocate of Ijtihad and considered it essential for the vigour of society. Re-inforcing the classical theory, he considered Ijtihad to be fard kifaya (communal obligation). Condemning the prevalent partisanship over Taqleed he denounced the Muqallid camp as the misguided "simpletons of our time". He considered himself as a Mujtahid of the highest rank affiliated to Hanafi school.

In his treatise Usul al-Sittah (Six Foundations), Ibn 'Abd al-Wahhab harshly rebuked the Muqallids for raising the description of Mujtahids to humanely unattainable levels. He also condemned the practice of obligating Taqleed which deviated people away from Qur'an and Sunnah. In similar terms, Yemeni scholar Shawkani too condemned the practice of rigid Taqleed. Demonstrating the perpetual existence of Mujtahids in his works, Shawkani also argued that Ijtihad at later times was far easier due to detailed manuals unavailable for jurists of the past era.

Amongst the eighteenth-century reformers, the most radical condemnation of Taqlid and advocacy of Ijtihad was championed by the Arabian scholar Muhammad ibn 'Abd al-Wahhab, whose uncompromising reformist efforts often turned violent. Ibn 'Abd al-Wahhab condemned the centuries-long heritage of jurisprudence (Fiqh) that coalesced into four schools (mad'habs) as an innovation. Challenging the authority of religious clerics, and a large portion of the classical scholarship, he proclaimed the necessity of directly returning to Qur'an and hadith, rather than relying on medieval interpretations. According to Ibn 'Abd al-Wahhab, in order to uphold true monotheism (Tawhid), Muslims should return to the pristine Islam of the early generations (Salaf), stripped of all human additions and speculations. In his legal treatises such as Mukhtasar al-Insaf wa al-Sharh al-Kabir, Ibn 'Abd al-Wahhab weighed in legal opinions between different schools, opening the realm to comparative Fiqh thinking and often referring the conclusions of Ibn Taymiyya. This legal approach of drawing inferences directly from Qur'an and Hadith (istinbat), instead of taqlid to one of the 4 law schools, as well as his prohibition of Taqlid, drew sharp condemnation from the Muqallid camp. In a scathing response, Muhammad Ibn 'Abdul Wahhab accused his detractors of taking "the scholars as lords" and vehemently condemned taqleed as the biggest principle of the kuffar (disbelievers), in his treatise Masa'il al-Jahiliyya (Aspects of the Days of Ignorance) writing :

"Their religion was built upon certain principles, the greatest of which was taqleed (blind following). So this was the biggest principle for all of the disbelievers – the first and last of them"

In face of the backlash towards Ibn 'Abd al-Wahhab's uncompromising stance in his rejection of taqlid, advocacy of Ijtihad and radical anti-madhab views, the later Wahhabis became more conciliatory towards traditional four schools of Fiqh. Abdallah, the son of Ibn 'Abd al-Wahhab also toned down the radical anti-Taqlid stances by stating that they affiliate themselves to the Hanbali school and do not condemn the common people who make taqleed to the four schools of jurisprudence. The earliest substantial Wahhabite treatise on Ijtihad was written by the scholar Ibn Mu'ammar (d. 1810), a student of Ibn Abd al-Wahhab and a Qadi of First Saudi state. In his treatise "Risalat al-Ijtihad wal Taqlid", Ibn Muammar gave respect to the four traditional Sunni schools of law and distinguished between two ranks of Mujtahids: independent Mujtahid and Mujtahid al-Muqayyid bound to the Imams. According to Ibn Mu'ammar, Taqlid is permissible for laymen and scholar without sufficient knowledge, but forbidden for those who can comprehend the bases of the law. Unlike Ibn 'Abd al-Wahhab, Ibn Mu'ammar permitted laypeople to make Taqleed to trustworthy scholars, with certain reservations. Despite this, he also criticized strict adherence to a madhab and denounced mad'hab fanaticism as a bid'ah (innovation). According to Ibn Mu'ammar, the opinions of Imams should be discarded if they differ from authentic Prophetic traditions.

Outlining the conventional Wahhabi legal theory which harmonised the madhhab system with the practice of Ijtihad, Ibn Mu'ammar writes:

"Adopting the [revealed] proof [for a position] without considering the statements of [other] ulama is the function of the absolute mujtahid... [Laity are] obligated to practice taqlid and to consult those with knowledge.. [But the idea that one must always follow a single school] is a false view which Satan has cast upon many claimants to knowledge. ... [T]hey imagine that study of the proofs is a difficult matter, of which only an absolute mujtahid is capable... [They have even arrived at a claim] that one associated with the school of an imam is obliged to accept that school... even if it differs with the Qur'an and the sunna. Thus, the imam of the school is to the members of his school as the Prophet is to his Community, ... You will [also] find the fanatic adherents of the schools in many matters differing with the explicit positions of their imams, and following the views of the latecomers in their school,.. the books of the predecessors are hardly found among them."

Ahmad Ibn Idris Al-Fasi also emphasized on the practice of ijtihad. His criticism of Taqleed of the schools of law (madhhabs) was based on three concerns. First, the need for following the Prophetic traditions. Second, to reduce divisions between the Muslims. Third, mercy for the Muslims, because there were 'few circumstances on which the Quran and Sunna were genuinely silent, but if there was a silence on any question, then that silence was intentional on God's part- a divine mercy.' He therefore rejected any 'attempt to fill a silence deliberately left by God, and so to abrogate one of His mercies.'

His student, Muhammad ibn Ali al-Sanusi also followed in his footsteps. In his work Al-Bughya, Al Sanusi advocates for the need to practice Ijtihad. The most detailed treatise by Al-Sanusi on the topic of Ijtihad is Iqaz al-wasnan fi 'l-'amal bi'l-hadith wa'l-Qur`an. Quoting Ibn Taymiyya, Al Sanusi emphasizes on the principle of fallibility of the Imams of the madhabs and the obligation to follow the Sunnah. The opinions of the four Imams should only be used for a better understanding of Fiqh. Following Ibn Hazm and Shawkani, Sanussi asserted that taqlid is bid'ah(innovation) and fully condemned it. Sanussi distinguished between the independent Mujtahid and the affiliated Mujtahid and affirmed the existence of the affiliated Mujtahid in every age. He also objected to Taqlid and emphasized that Qur'an and Sunna must be given precedence over the opinions of Mujtahids, even in cases where the 4 Imams are wrong.

Remarkably, all these reformers shared common points of contact in Hijaz and a network of scholars with a Hijazi-Yemeni centre. Shah Waliullah Dehlawi and Muhammad Hayat as-Sindi were pupils of Muhammad Ibn Ibrahim Al Kurrani Al Kurdi as well as connected to Ibrahim Ibn Hasan Al Kurrani Al Kurdi (d. 1690) and AbuI-Baqa' al-Hasan ibn 'Ali al- Ajami (d. 1702). Al-Sanusi is also linked with these scholars via his teacher al-Badr b. 'Amir al-Mi'dani who was a student of Al-Sindi as well as via other independent chains. Al-Shawkani is connected to Ibrahim Al-Kurrani via his teacher Yusuf Ibn Muhammad.

Outside these circles, some scholars amongst traditional Sufi circles were also in favour of Ijtihad. These included the prominent Ottoman Hanafite jurist Ibn Abidin (1784-1836) who is a scholarly authoritaty for even Hanafites of the Taqleed camp. Ibn Abidin employed Ijtihad in order to issue fatwas, using reasoning and believed that ijtihad was acceptable to use in certain circumstances. According to Ibn Abidin, Hanafite Muftis should look up to rulings of Abu Hanifa, then Abu Yusuf, then Shaybani, then Zufar and then some lesser jurists for fatwas. However, if a previous Hanafi scholar hasn't found an answer to the issue, then he should employ Ijtihad to solve the novel issue. According to Ibn Abidin, it is not obligatory to follow a particular mad'hab as well.

==== Contemporary debates over Ijtihad ====
On the issue of existence of Mujtahids and continuity of Ijtihad, contemporary scholarship are divided into two diametric camps, and a third moderate camp:

1) Those who oppose Ijtihad: These include the Orientalist scholars who view that "Gates of Ijtihad are closed". Sufi groups such as Barelvis, Deobandis, etc. believe that Mujtahids have ceased to exist. Some others such as Said Nursi is not theoretically against Ijtihad, but advocates postponing Ijtihad to a later time when Muslims attain sufficient strength.

2) Those who advocate Ijtihad: These include Salafi scholars and Islamic modernists who believe in the existence of Mujtahids. Salafis argue that Ijtihad doesn't have a gate, but only pre-requisites. Others who advocate Ijtihad include Muhammad Iqbal, Muhammad Asad, etc. Recent scholars in academia such as Wael Hallaq are also its supporters.

3) Those who take an intermediary position.

==== Islamic modernism ====
Starting in the middle of the 19th century, Islamic modernists such as Sir Sayyid Ahmed Khan, Jamal al-din Al-Afghani, and Muhammad Abduh emerged seeking to revitalize Islam by re-establish and reform Islamic law and its interpretations to accommodate Islam with modern society. They emphasized the use of ijtihad, but in contrast to its original use, they sought to "apply contemporary intellectual methods" such as academic or scientific thought "to the task of reforming Islam". Al-Afghani proposed the new use of ijtihad that he believed would enable Muslims to think critically and apply their own individual interpretations of the innovations of modernity in the context of Islam.

One modernist argument for applying ijtihad to sharia law is that while "the principles and values underlying Sharia (i.e. usul al-fiqh)" are unalterable, human interpretation of sharia is not. Another, (made by Asghar Ali Engineer of India), is that the adaat (customs and traditions) of Arabs were used in the development of the sharia, and form an important part of it. They are very much not divine or immutable, and have no more legal justification to be part of the sharia than the adaat of Muslims—Iranians, Uzbeks, Turks, Chinese, Indians and others—living beyond the home of the original Muslim in the Arab Hejaz.

Ummah was no longer a homogenous group but comprised of various cultural communities with their own age-old customs and traditions. ... When Imam Al-Shafi'i moved from Hejaz to Egypt, which was a confluence of Arab and Coptic cultures, he realised this and changed his position on several issues.

In Indonesia, following considerable debate among the ulema, Indonesian adaat "become part of Sharia as applicable in that country". This use of ijtihad of adaat applies to mu'amalat (socio-economic matters such as marriage, divorce, inheritance), and not Ibadah fiqh (ritual salat, sawm, zakat, etc.). Asghar Ali Engineer argues that while the Quran was revealed in a "highly patriarchal" Arab adaat that still informs what is understood as sharia, the Quran itself has a "transcendental" vision of justice that includes "absolutely equal rights" between genders and should guide ijtihad of sharia.

==== Islamism and Salafism ====
Contemporary Salafis are major proponents of ijtihad. They criticize taqlid and believe ijtihad makes modern Islam more authentic and will guide Muslims back to the Golden Age of early Islam. Salafis assert that reliance on taqlid has led to Islam's decline.

Ahl-i-Hadith revivalist movement of Indian subcontinent highly influenced by the thoughts of Shah Waliullah Dehlawi, Shawkani and Syed Ahmed Barelvi, fully condemn taqlid and advocate for ijtihad based on scriptures. Founded in mid-19th century in Bhopal, it places great emphasis on hadith studies and condemns imitation to the canonical law schools. They identify with the early school of Ahl al-Hadith. During the late 19th century, Najdi scholars would establish contacts with Ahl-i-Hadith and many Najdi students would study under the scholars of Ahl-i-Hadith, amongst them prominent scholars.

The Muslim Brotherhood traces its founding philosophies to al-Afghani's ijtihad. The Muslim Brotherhood holds that the practice of ijtihad will strengthen the faith of believers by compelling them to better familiarize themselves with the Quran and come to their own conclusions about its teachings. But as a political group the Muslim Brotherhood faces a major paradox between ijtihad as a religious matter and as a political one. Ijtihad weakens political unity and promotes pluralism (which is also why many oppressive regimes reject ijtihad's legitimacy).

The Iranian Ayatollah Ruhollah Khomeini envisioned a prominent role for ijtihad in his political theory of "guardianship of the jurist" (vilāyat-e faqīh).

Osama bin Laden supported ijtihad. He criticized the Saudi regime for disallowing the "free believer" and imposing harsh restrictions on successful practice of Islam. Thus, Bin Laden believed his striving for the implementation of ijtihad was his "duty" (takleef).

== Qualifications of a mujtahid ==
A mujtahid (Arabic: مُجْتَهِد, "diligent") is an individual who is qualified to exercise ijtihad in the evaluation of Islamic law. The female equivalent is a mujtahida. In general mujtahids must have an extensive knowledge of Arabic, the Qur'an, the Sunnah, and legal theory (Usul al-fiqh). Sunni Islam and Shia Islam, due to their divergent beliefs regarding the persistence of divine authority, have different views on ijtihad and the qualifications required to achieve mujtahid.

=== Sunni ===
In the years following the death of Muhammad, Sunni Muslims practiced ijtihad and saw it as an acceptable form of the continuation of sacred instruction. Sunni Muslims justified practice of Ijtihad with a particular hadith, which cites Muhammad's approval of forming an individual sound legal opinion if the Qur'an and Sunnah contain no explicit text regarding that particular issue. As Muslims turned to the Quran and Sunnah to solve their legal issues, they began to recognize that these Divine proponents did not deal directly with certain topics of law. Therefore, Sunni jurists began to find other ways and sources for ijtihad which allowed for personal judgment of Islamic law. Thus, a legal theory (usul al-Fiqh) was developed during the classical period to facilitate Ijtihad. It established a coherent system of principles through which a jurist could extract rulings on upcoming issues. Only a competent Muslim of sound mind with intellectual qualifications was allowed to engage in Ijtihad. Abu'l-Husayn al-Basri (d. 436/1044) provides the earliest, complete account for the qualifications of a mujtahid, in his book "al-Mu'tamad fi Usul al-Fiqh". They include:

- Enough knowledge of Arabic so that the scholar can read and understand both the Qur'an and the Sunnah.
- Extensive comprehensive knowledge of the Qur'an and the Sunnah. More specifically, the scholar must have a full understanding of the Qur'an's legal contents. In regards to the Sunnah the scholar must understand the specific texts that refer to law and also the incidence of abrogation in the Sunnah.
- Must be able to confirm the consensus (Ijma) of the Companions, the Successors, and the leading Imams and mujtahideen of the past, in order to prevent making decisions that disregard these honored decisions made in the past.
- Should be able to fully understand the objectives of the sharia and be dedicated to the protection of the five necessities, which are life, religion, intellect, lineage, and property.
- Be able to distinguish strength and weakness in reasoning, or in other words exercise logic.
- Must be sincere and a good person.

After Basri, classical Mujtahids like Al-Shirazi (d. 467/1083), Al-Ghazzali (d. 505/1111), Al-Amidi (d. 632/1234) would also develop various criterion with minor changes. Amidi also allowed less qualified Mujtahids who didn't meet these requirements to solve issues provided he has the tools of solution. From the declaration of these requirements of mujtahid onwards, legal scholars adopted these characteristics as being standard for any claimant of ijtihad. This allowed for mujtahids to openly discuss their particular views and reach a conclusion together. The interaction required by ijma allowed for mujtahids to circulate ideas and eventually merge to create particular Islamic schools of law (madhhabs). This consolidation of mujtahids into particular madhhabs prompted these groups to create their own distinct authoritative rules. These laws reduced issues of legal uncertainty that had been present when multiple mujtahids were working together with one another. Oftentimes, multiple rulings would be issued by jurists of the same legal school. Historical records show that throughout the tenth to nineteenth centuries, legal practitioners had consistently modified law using degrees of Ijtihad, making it flexible and adaptable to change. Eventually, there developed a legal system of authoritative rulings on which influential jurists agreed. However, by the 14th century, while influential jurists held that knowledgeable legal scholars should be allowed to engage in Ijtihad , some others began to argue that there were no longer any legal scholars capable of performing Ijtihad beyond a certain limit as the founders of the four mad'habs. Despite this dispute, many high-ranking jurists upheld the practice of Ijtihad in legal rulings.

Recent scholarship has largely adopted this view, concluding that Ijtihad was indispensable in Islamic legal theory. Rather than obstructing Ijtihad, the legal theory as well as its stipulated qualifications facilitated Ijtihad.

=== Shia ===
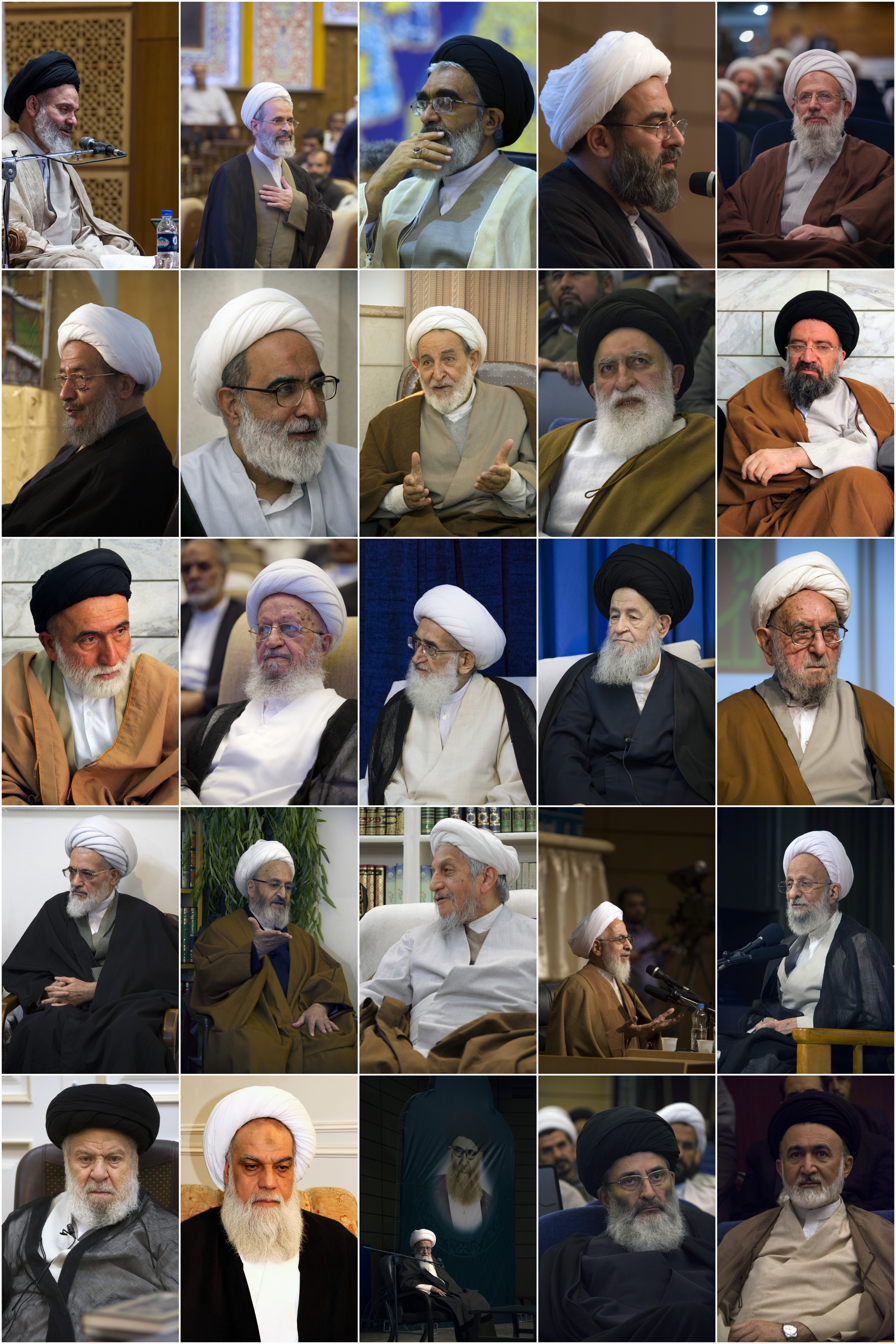
Grand Ayatollahs of Qom, Iran; Religious leaders who have the authority to interpret sharia sources in Shia Islam used assertive titles such as Ayatollah, Hujjat al-Islam, which directly connect their identities to Allah or Islam, and gained tutelage over people and the administration

Shia Muslims understand the process of ijtihad as being the independent effort used to arrive at the rulings of sharia. Following the death of the Prophet and once they had determined the Imam as absent, ijtihad evolved into a practice of applying careful reason in order to uncover the knowledge of what Imams would have done in particular legal situations. The decisions the Imams would have made were explored through the application of the Qur'an, Sunnah, ijma and 'aql (reason). It was not until the end of the eighteenth century that the title of mujtahid became associated with the term faqih or one who is an expert in jurisprudence. From this point on religious courts began to increase in number and the ulama were transformed by Shia Islamic authorities into the new producer of ijtihad. Early Shiite theologians had denounced Sunni interpretative tools like Ijtihad and Qiyas (analogical reasoning) citing reports from the Shi'i Imams. They held that Ijtihad was a deductive process based on personal conjecture to argue that it had no legal basis in the shari'a (Islamic law). Therefore, until the 13th century, the concept of Ijtihad was denounced disparagingly by the Shi'i jurists, who wanted to construct a systematic and stable legal edifice that was devoid of any uncertainty. However, with the passage of time some Shia jurists sensed the need to respond to newer and novel circumstances.

According to Usuli scholars, Mujtahids existed continuously since the 16th century and employed Ijtihad to form new laws according to altering circumstances. From the late 18th century, Usuli jurists had advocated for appending 'Aql (intellect) as the fourth source of law. This enabled them to issue legal opinions based on societal needs. The Akhbari school rejected the idea of human intellect playing any role in legal reasoning. In order to produce perceptive mujtahids that could fulfill this important role, Usulis developed the principles of Shia jurisprudence (Usool) to provide a foundation for scholarly deduction of Islamic law. Shaykh Murtada Ansari and his successors developed the school of Shia law, dividing the legal decisions into four levels of certainty (qat), valid conjecture (zann), doubt (shakk), and erroneous conjecture (wahm). These rules allowed mujtahids to issue adjudications on any subject, that could be derived through this process of ijtihad, demonstrating responsibility to the Shia community. Furthermore, according to Shia Islamic Jurisprudence a believer of Islam is either a Mujtahid (one that expresses their own legal reasoning), or a Muqallid (one performing taqlid—following or imitating a Mujtahid) and a Muhtat ("a lay Shiite who does not follow anyone, yet acts on such precaution that assures him the fulfilment of his religious obligations"). Most Shia Muslims qualify as Muqallid, and therefore are very dependent on the rulings of the Mujtahids. Therefore, the Mujtahids must be well prepared to perform ijtihad, as the community of Muqallid are dependent on their rulings. Not only did Shia Muslims require:

- Knowledge of the texts of the Qur'an and Sunnah
- Justice in matters of public and personal life
- Utmost piety
- Understanding of the cases where Shia mujtahids reached consensus
- Ability to exercise competence and authority

However, these scholars also depended on further training that could be received in religious centers called Hawza. At these centers they are taught the important subjects and technical knowledge a mujtahid need be proficient in such as:

- Arabic grammar and literature
- Logic
- Extensive knowledge of the Qur'anic sciences and Hadith
- Science of narrators
- Principle of Jurisprudence
- Comparative Jurisprudence

Therefore, Shia mujtahids remain revered throughout the Shia Islamic world. The relationship between the mujtahids and muqallids continues to address and solve the contemporary legal issues. Participating in ijtihad, however, has been cautioned by scholars for those not properly educated in interpretation of the Qu'ran. This is narrated by Ali ibn Husayn Zayn al-Abidin, the great-grandson of Muhammad, when he cautioned Aban ibn abi-Ayyash, a fellow companion, saying, "Oh brother from 'Abd Qays, if the issue becomes clear to you, then accept it. Otherwise remain silent and defer to Allah because your interpretation from the truth will be as far from the Earth as the sky."

=== Female mujtahids ===
Women can be Mujtahid and throughout Islamic history there were well known female Islamic scholars and Mujtahids who played an important role in traditional Islamic discourse. Aisha the wife of Muhammad was a well-known hadith scholar and a Mujtahid. She was an assertive, intelligent woman as well as an eloquent speaker. According to Urwah Ibn Zubair, Aisha was the most knowledgeable in hadith and fiqh and surpassed everyone in knowledge of poetry and medicine. Al-Zuhri studied under the well-known woman jurist of the day, Amrah bint Abdul Rahman. She was one of the most knowledgeable people of hadith and was described as an "ocean of knowledge". When the judge of Madinah heard Amrah's message, he did not feel the need to get a male opinion, although Madinah was then housing the famous Seven Jurists. Islamic scholar Akram Nadwi published a 40-volume biographical collection of female Muslim scholars wherein more than 8,000 female scholars were detailed. Other famous female Muhadditha and jurists include Zainab bint Kamal, Fatima Al Batayahiyyah, Fatimah bint Muhammad al Samarqandi, etc. Fatima Al Fihiriyya founded the University of Qarawiyyin in Fez in 859, world's first academic university that offered a degree. Scholars such as Umm al-Darda used to sit and debate with male scholars in the mosque. She was a teacher of hadith and Fiqh and also lectured in the men's section. One of her students was a Caliph.

In Shiism, there have been dozens of women who have attained the rank in the modern history of Iran (for instance, Amina Bint al-Majlisi in the Safavid era, Bibi Khanum in the Qajar era, Lady Amin in the Pahlavi era, and Zohreh Sefati during the time of the Islamic Republic). There are diverging opinions as to whether a female mujtahid can be a marjaʻ or not. Zohreh Sefati and some male jurists believe a female mujtahida can become a marja' — in other words, they believe that believers perform taqlid (emulation) of a female mujtahid— but most male jurists believe a marjaʻ must be male.
