= Manzoor Ahmad =

Pakistani scientist (born 1934)

- Professor Manzoor Ahmad
- Born: 11 March 1934 (age 92); Rampur, Rampur State (present-day India)
- Died: 2025
- Citizenship: Pakistan
- Education: University of Karachi; University of London
- Known for: His work on Philosophy of space and time, and philosophy of time and science
- Awards: Fulbright Award
- Scientific career
- Fields: Philosophy of science (space and time)
- Workplaces: International Islamic University; Usman Institute of Technology; National Center for Theoretical Physics

Manzoor Ahmed (1934–2025) was a Pakistani scientist and philosopher of science. He was a professor of philosophy who served as a rector of Usman Institute of Technology.

== Early life and education ==
Manzoor Ahmed was born into an Urdu-speaking family, in Rampur, Uttar Pradesh on 11 March 1934. His parents home schooled him, and he was later enrolled in a local middle school. He was a child prodigy, and enrolled in High School at the age of seven, where he excelled. Ahmad graduated from high school, and stood first in the matriculation examination for the state. He attended Raza Inter-College (RIC) where he studied science and philosophy, and stood first in the college examination for university transfer. Ahmad was persuaded by his family to study medicines; he therefore applied for three medical schools— King George Medical University in Lucknow, King Edward Medical College in Lahore, and Dow Medical College in Karachi. However, Ahmad decided to pursue his inclination for philosophy and did not join any of these institutions. He moved to Karachi, Sindh Province and joined S.M. Arts College.

In 1947, Ahmad acquired the Pakistani citizenship, joining Karachi University in 1951. There he studied physics, mathematics and philosophy, and obtained a minor in Mathematics, and a B.Sc. (Hons) in Physics and a BA in Philosophy in 1953. In 1955, Ahmad obtained a MA in philosophy from the same university. With a HEC scholarship, Ahmad went to London, United Kingdom to attend the school of his choice. Ahmad enrolled in a doctoral programme at London University. Continuing his interest in physics, Ahmad was awarded a doctorate in philosophy of science, with a focus on the mathematical and philosophical notion of space and time continuum.

== Academic career ==
Since his return to his country, Ahmad has worked for the Government of Pakistan, as head of various national and international organizations. He is also an active member of the Council of Islamic Ideology in Pakistan. After returning to Pakistan, Ahmad became associated to the Karachi University and has directed their Department of Philosophy; he was later appointed as the Dean of their faculty of Fine Arts. Ahmad was the President of the Pakistan Philosophical Congress (PPC), which works for the improvement of Philosophical studies in the country. He was a Fulbright scholar, and has lectured on philosophy of science at the University of Chicago, Columbia University, and the University of California. He was also awarded fellowships by the Brown Foundation and the British Council.

Ahmad held the vice-chancellorship of Hamdard University twice and holds the Chairmanship of the Usman Institute of Technology. He is the Rector of the International Islamic University, Islamabad and Chairman of the Board of Governors for the Indus Valley School of Art and Architecture (IVS).

== Research ==
Ahmad has written important books about the relation between consciousness, science and philosophy. In his article, The Notion of Existence, Ahmad argued that the impact of scientific development has created the problem of the subjectivity of sense qualities and a separation between knowledge and existence. Ahmad further noted that, "the picture of the world given by immediate perception is totally different from what the world actually is, leading to an opposition between existence and true knowledge. Galileo's solution is that this difference between knowledge and existence disappears to a certain extent in the clearest knowledge we possess, i.e. mathematical knowledge." However, Ahmad believes in the theory of general relativity and cited that "without the existence of the Spacetime continuum, the universe would not exist and we would not exist".

== Selected works ==
- History of Philosophy
- Morality and Law
- Pakistan: Prospects and Perspectives
- Iqbal Shanasi
- Islam: Chand Fikri Masail
- Religious Wisdom
