= Fusus al-Hikam (book) =

Fusus al-Hikam (Arabic: فصوص الحکم, literally The Bezels of Wisdom), also known by the English title The Wisdom of the Prophets, is the work of the Andalusian mystic and philosopher Ibn Arabi (1165–1240). The book presents a complex metaphysical system through a series of chapters, each dedicated to a different prophet, from Adam to Muhammad. Each chapter expounds on a specific divine Name and Attribute, revealing a particular facet of universal wisdom through the prophetic narrative. Ibn al-Arabi himself stated in his autobiographical works that the book was dictated to him by the Prophet Muhammad in a dream, a common belief among his followers. Ibn Arabi's seminal work, Fusus al-Hikam, has inspired over a hundred commentaries, with key ones provided by his student Sadr al-Din al-Qunawi and later scholars like Abd al-Razzaq Kāshānī and Dawūd al-Qayṣarī. Notable works include Ibn Arabi's own summary, Jami's commentary on it, and several significant Persian commentaries. These commentaries aim to elucidate the profound mystical and philosophical concepts within Fusus al-Hikam.

== Structure and Themes ==
The Fusus al-Hikam is structured into 27 chapters, each named after a prophet, beginning with Adam and concluding with Muhammad. Each chapter expounds on a specific divine Name and Attribute, revealing a particular facet of universal wisdom through the prophetic narrative. Ibn Arabi posits that each prophet’s soul functions as a vessel, shaped by the divine wisdom it receives, analogous to a gemstone being set in a bezel. Each prophet, therefore, possesses a unique innate nature (the bezel) enabling the reception and embodiment of a specific divine wisdom (the gemstone). Consequently, the singular, eternal divine wisdom is conformed to the contours of its human receptacle. This singular wisdom, when manifested in specific historical and social contexts, differentiates in form according to the prophet and their community, leading to diverse religious expressions that nonetheless share a common essence and origin.

== Commentaries ==
There have been many commentaries on Ibn 'Arabī's Fuṣūṣ al-Ḥikam: Osman Yahya named more than 100 while Michel Chodkiewicz precises that "this list is far from exhaustive." The first one was Kitab al-Fukūk written by Ṣadr al-Dīn al-Qunawī who had studied the book with Ibn 'Arabī; the second by Qunawī's student, Mu'ayyad al-Dīn al-Jandi, which was the first line-by-line commentary; the third by Jandī's student, Dawūd al-Qaysarī, which became very influential in the Persian-speaking world. A recent English translation of Ibn 'Arabī's own summary of the Fuṣūṣ, Naqsh al-Fuṣūṣ (The Imprint or Pattern of the Fusus) as well a commentary on this work by 'Abd al-Raḥmān Jāmī, Naqd al-Nuṣūṣ fī Sharḥ Naqsh al-Fuṣūṣ (1459), by William Chittick was published in Volume 1 of the Journal of the Muhyiddin Ibn 'Arabi Society (1982).

== Critical editions and translations of Fuṣūṣ al-Ḥikam ==
The Fuṣūṣ was first critically edited in Arabic by 'Afīfī (1946) that become the standard in scholarly works. Later in 2015, Ibn al-Arabi Foundation in Pakistan published the Urdu translation, including the new critical of Arabic edition.

The first English translation was done in partial form by Angela Culme-Seymour from the French translation of Titus Burckhardt as Wisdom of the Prophets (1975), and the first full translation was by Ralph Austin as Bezels of Wisdom (1980). There is also a complete French translation by Charles-Andre Gilis, entitled Le livre des chatons des sagesses (1997). The only major commentary to have been translated into English so far is entitled Ismail Hakki Bursevi's translation and commentary on Fusus al-hikam by Muhyiddin Ibn 'Arabi, translated from Ottoman Turkish by Bulent Rauf in 4 volumes (1985–1991).

In Urdu, the most widespread and authentic translation was made by Shams Ul Mufasireen Bahr-ul-uloom Hazrat (Muhammad Abdul Qadeer Siddiqi Qadri -Hasrat), the former Dean and Professor of Theology of the Osmania University, Hyderabad. It is due to this reason that his translation is in the curriculum of Punjab University. Maulvi Abdul Qadeer Siddiqui has made an interpretive translation and explained the terms and grammar while clarifying the Shaikh's opinions. A new edition of the translation was published in 2014 with brief annotations throughout the book for the benefit of contemporary Urdu reader.
