= UIT University =

University in Karachi, Pakistan

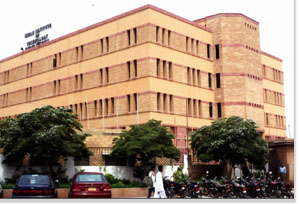
- Former names: Usman Institute of Technology
- Motto: Grooming little young generation for betterment of society
- Type: Private
- Established: 1994
- Accreditation: HEC, PEC, NCEAC, NEDUET
- Chancellor: Hussain Hasham
- President: Dr. Vali Uddin
- Vice-Chancellor: Dr. Vali Uddin
- Location: Karachi, Sindh, Pakistan; 24.931792°N 67.112646°E
- Campus: Urban
- Colours: White, amber, blue
- Website: www.uitu.edu.pk

Usman Institute of Technology, commonly known as UIT is a private university located at the intersection of University Road and Abul Hasan Isphahani Road, Gulshan-e-Iqbal, Karachi, Pakistan.

On December 18, 2021, the inauguration ceremony took place, officiated by the Governor of Sindh, Imran Ismail. During this event, the institute attained the status of a full-fledged university from its previous renowned institute designation.

The university offers undergraduate studies in engineering, business management, and computer science programmes.

== Usman Memorial Foundation ==
Usman Memorial Foundation was formed in 1973 in the memory of Late Mohammad Usman, by his family members, friends, and well-wishers. Mr. A.K. Brohi was the first President, while Dr. Manzoor Ahmad was the Secretary General of the Foundation.

There were two Usman Memorial Scholarship awarded to research scholars namely Dr. Syeda Khatoon for research entitled "An Analysis of Religion Philosophy of Sir Syed Ahmed" and Dr. Rasheed Ahmed Jalandri for research entitled "Deoband Movement and Religious reforms". Both the research papers were published in the shape of a book.

In 1994, the Foundation established Usman Institute of Technology (UIT) on the plot of land allotted to the Foundation located at Abul Hasan Isphahani Road, with total contribution from the Hasham family.

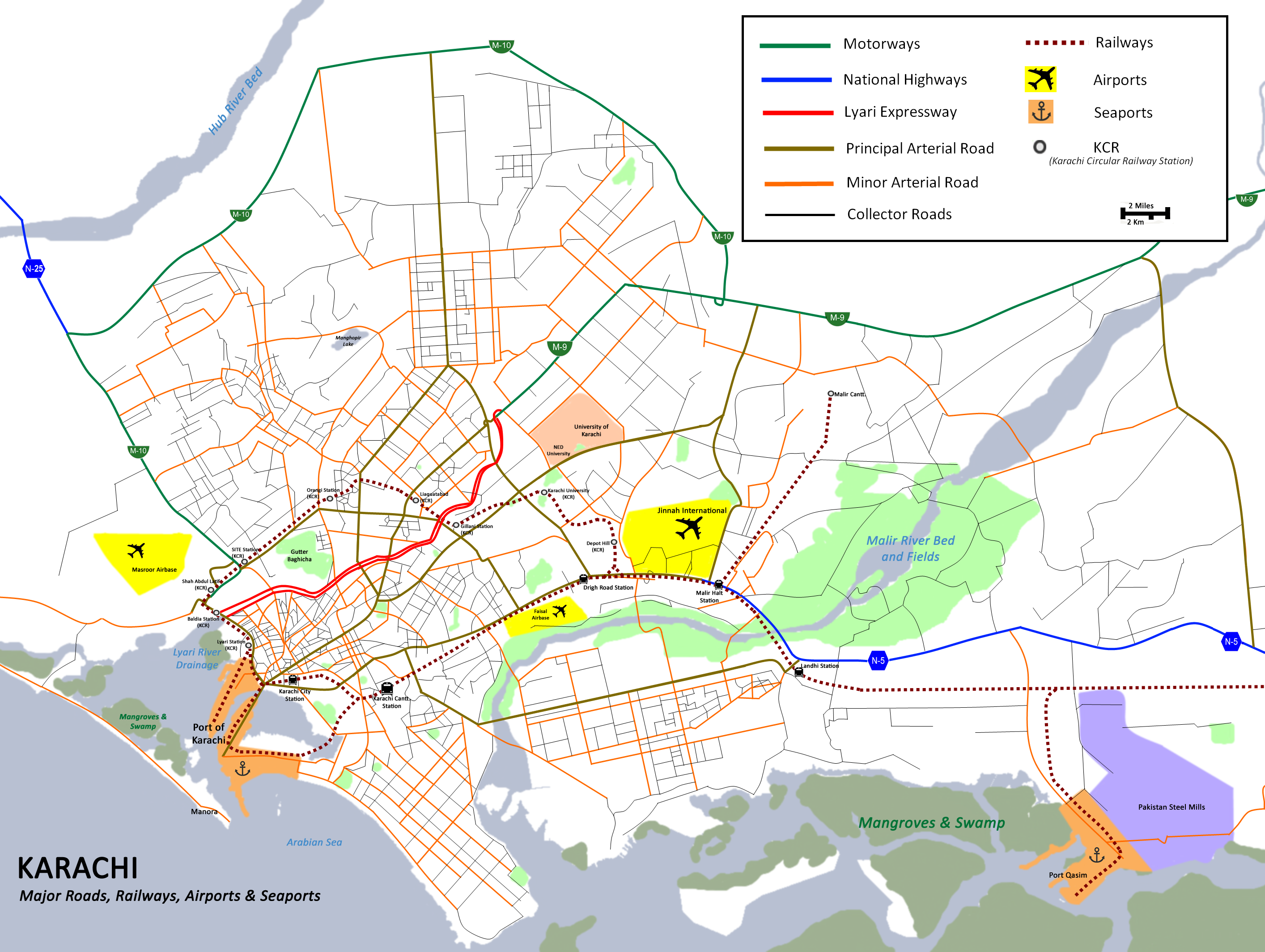
Location in Karachi

== History ==
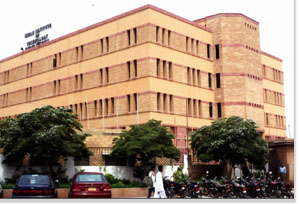
Usman Institute of Technology

UIT had its genesis due to an endowment from the Hasham family of the Memon community in remembrance of Mohammad Usman Hasham, son of Haji Hasham, a tycoon and a philanthropist.

Haji Hasham embarked on his business journey at the age of 11, early in the 20th century, while in India. Upon relocating to Karachi in 1936, he embarked on a path of business expansion. Notable industries such as Mehran Sugar Mills, Mogul Tobacco, Pakistan Molasses Company, and Usman Textile were integral to his business endeavors. His sons were driven by a desire to contribute to community welfare. One of his sons, a student of Dr. Manzoor Ahmad, a distinguished scholar and Dean of the Department of Philosophy at Karachi University, found inspiration in Dr. Manzoor's philosophy and shared his humanist values.

Usman died in 1973 at the age of 38 due to a brain hemorrhage. Heeding the counsel of Usman's mentor, Dr. Manzoor Ahmad, and with the support of the esteemed lawyer and writer, the late Mr. A.K. Brohi, the 'Usman Memorial Foundation' was established in the same year. Mr. Brohi accepted the role of President, while Dr. Manzoor Ahmad was invited to serve as the General Secretary of the Foundation.

The Foundation arranged lectures by scholars, established a library, and provided research scholarships. In 1976, the Foundation acquired a parcel of land along University Road with the aim of establishing an educational institution.

Following a suggestion from Mr. Ebrahim Hashami and supported by the financial contributions of the Hasham Family, the Usman Institute of Technology was founded in 1995. The institute was established in collaboration with the Technical University of Nova Scotia, Canada. By 1997, the Usman Memorial Foundation had entered into an agreement with Hamdard University, enabling them to confer degrees upon UIT students. Dr. Manzoor Ahmad, a central figure, assumed the role of Life Chairman of the executive board at UIT.

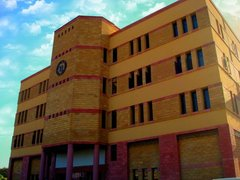
UIT side view.

== Programs offered ==
=== Accreditation ===
UIT's undergraduate programs are recognized by Higher Education Commission (HEC).

UIT's engineering programs are accredited by Pakistan Engineering Council (PEC).

UIT's computer science and software engineering program is accredited by National Computing Education Accreditation Council (NCEAC).

=== Undergraduate ===
- B.E. Electrical (Electronics)
- B.E. Electrical (Telecommunication)
- B.E. Electrical (Power)
- B.E Electrical (Computer System)
- B.S. Computer Science
- B.S. Software Engineering
- BBA

== Student organizations ==
=== UITCS ACM Student Chapter ===
The UIT Computer Society (UITCS) is a group of undergraduate students dedicated to develop the interest of people in computing and information technologies. UITCS activities include poster sessions, seminars, workshops, and competitions.

The society has established an R&D department to uncover the problems facing local IT industries and find possible solutions.

In March 2006, the Association for Computing Machinery (ACM) officially chartered UITCS as a Student Chapter, so UITCS was renamed UITCS ACM Student Chapter. ACM, the Association for Computing Machinery, is an educational and scientific society uniting the world's computing educators, researchers, and professionals.

=== UTECH ===
UTECH is a software competition in Pakistan. UTECH 2009 was organized at UIT campus at Abul-Hasan Isphani Road, Karachi. It was one of the largest information technology events of Pakistan with contests and exhibitions of software from all over the country and the neighboring countries of South Asia. It includes a Software Competition, Dynamic Programming Contest with the collaboration of ACM's NUCES Chapter, Kids Corner (where students from Grade School display their ideas), G3n. X (Generation Xtreme) Gaming Competition and book festival.

=== UIT University Literary Society ===
UIT has a literary society, which is student-led and overseen by faculty members from the humanities department. The UITU Literary Society is yet to organize any competitions or events.

=== UIT University Reader's Club ===
Reader's Club was formed by Mufti Emad-ul-Haq and student Wajid Hassan to develop the understanding of the sociopolitical condition of the Pakistan and the importance of Islam to the country and its impact on the society and individuals. Readers club intends produce well behaved personalities with capabilities of tolerance. The discussions in this club are very analytical in nature and have developed strong communication skills among the students. Sessions of Reader's Club are arranged and organized by students on topics set or voted by students on their Facebook page. Topics regarding current events, no matter how controversial, have been discussed in previous sessions. All sessions are chaired by Mufti Emad-ul-Haq. Faculty members from various departments also join the sessions along with students. Another aim of this club is to develop interpersonal and communication skills among engineering students who are otherwise perceived to be shy.

== International Partnership ==
Thanks to UIT's affiliation with Dalhousie University in Canada, over 40 UIT students completed their higher studies at Dalhousie University. Several of them, upon completing their studies, have returned to join the faculty at UIT. Additionally, professors from Dalhousie University frequently visited UIT to deliver guest lectures.
