= M. M. Sharif =

Pakistani philosopher (1893–1965)

- Born: 1893; Lahore, British Punjab, British India
- Died: 1965 (aged 71–72); Islamabad, Pakistan
- Awards: Tamgha-e-Imtiaz (1964)

Education
- Education: Cambridge University; Aligarh Muslim University

Philosophical work
- Era: Post-modern
- Region: Western Philosophy
- School: Analytic philosophy
- Institutions: Punjab University
- Main interests: Philosophy of religion, thoughts, dialectical monadism contemporary and Western Philosophy
- Notable ideas: Muslim philosophy

Mian Mohammad Sharif (Urdu:محمد شریف ) (1965 – 1893) TI was a Pakistani philosopher, Islamic scholar, and college professor. He is noted for his work in analytical philosophy and pioneered the idea of Muslim philosophy. His work was published in international philosophical journals.

He remained politically active with the Muslim League and advocated for the idea of establishing a separate state in British India, meaning a separate new state of Pakistan for the Muslims. He remained a member of the Islamic Ideology Council and taught at Islamia College, Lahore for the rest of his life.

== Early life and education ==
Mian Mohammad Sharif was born in the suburban area of Lahore, situated in Shalimar Garden of Lahore, British Punjab, British Indian Empire, in 1893.

Sharif was educated at the Muhammadan Anglo-Oriental College, Aligarh and the Aligarh Muslim University (AMU) where he studied Philosophy. He received a BA degree in philosophy from the AMU before moving to the United Kingdom for higher education. Settled in Cambridge, Sharif began attending the graduate school of philosophy at Cambridge University where he completed his MA and did his doctoral studies under English philosopher G. E. Moore.

== Career ==
His interest in realism and analytic philosophy widened and Sharif wrote on Monadism which was supervised by Moore as his PhD thesis. After receiving his PhD, his interest shifted to Western Philosophy and he said "Philosophy must find a place for the sciences in the systematic whole of knowledge."

After returning to British India, he chaired the philosophy department of the AMU and briefly participated in the Pakistan Movement. In 1945, he was appointed President of the Indian Philosophical Congress until he moved to Lahore to accept the professorship of philosophy at the Punjab University. In 1950, he founded and served as the first president of Pakistan Philosophical Congress, and remained associated with the society for the rest of his life. This organisation played a role in reviving interest in the study of modern philosophy. In addition, he also served as principal of Islamia College, Lahore and Director of the Institute of Islamic Culture based in Lahore. In 1956, he represented Pakistan in the UNESCO conference held in the United States. He was a member of the American Philosophical Association (Pacific Division) and a Director of the International Federation of Philosophical Societies, Paris. He already was the Founder-Life-President of the Pakistan Philosophical Congress. Sharif died and was buried in Lahore in 1965.

== Books ==
Better known as the editor of the 2-volume A History of Muslim Philosophy, his other books include:

=== English ===
- Three Lectures on the Nature of Tragedy: Being an Examination of Aristotle's Theory of Tragedy (1947)
- Beauty and Expression (1949)
- Muslim Thought: Its Origin and Achievements (1959)
- About Iqbal and His Thought (1964)
- Collected Papers (1964)
- National Integration: And Other Essays (1965)
- Crimes and Punishment in Islam (1972)

=== Urdu ===
- Jamaliyat ke Teen Nazariye (1963)
- Musalmanon ke Afkar (1963)

== Annotations and bibliography ==
- Choudhury, Masudul Alam (27 January 2011). "A History of Muslim Philosophy". Islamic economics and finance an epistemological inquiry (1st ed.). Bingley, UK: Emerald Group. ISBN 978-0857247223.
- Baldwin, Thomas, ed. (2003). "An Idealist View of Life". The Cambridge history of philosophy : 1870–1945 (1. publ. ed.). Cambridge [u.a.]: Cambridge University Press. ISBN 052159104X.
