= C. A. Qadir =

- Born: November 4, 1909; Sialkot, Punjab, British India
- Occupation: Professor at Government College Lahore

Dr. C. A. Qadir (4 November 1909 – 1987) was a Pakistani professor of Philosophy. He was born in Pasrur, Punjab, Pakistan.

== Biography ==
He completed his early education in Sialkot, received a Master's degree in Philosophy from Government College Lahore in 1932, and later the D.Litt. from the University of the Punjab. He started his career as a lecturer at Government College Lahore and later joined the Punjab University from where he retired as Professor and Head of the Department of Philosophy.

A founding member of the Pakistan Philosophical Congress, he was made its President for life.

Dr.C.A.Qadir has written thirty books on philosophy, ethics, and psychology. His major work, Philosophy and Science in the Islamic World (Croom Helm, 1988; reprinted Routledge, 1990) is a critical study of Islamic philosophy. His other major books are The World of Philosophy (Lahore, 1965) and Logical Positivism (Lahore, 1965).

He fathered five daughters and four sons. One of his grand-daughters (Dr Sara Qadir) is an OBGY Consultant. She is a member of the Royal College of Obstetricians and Gynaecologists London-UK and has written many research papers in her field. His great granddaughter, Noor Irfan, is also a writer.
