= Autograph (disambiguation) =

An autograph is a person's signature, but may also refer to:

== Writing ==
- Autograph collecting, the hobby of collecting autographs
- Autograph (manuscript), a document written entirely in the handwriting of its author
- Autograph letter (Holy See), a letter signed by the pope
- Autograph (Assyriology), a hand-copy of a cuneiform clay-tablet

== Film and TV ==
- Autograph (2004 film), a Tamil film
- Autograph (2010 film), a Bengali film
- Autograph (TV series), a Malayalam TV series

== Music ==
- Autograph (American band), an American glam metal band
- Autograph (Russian band), a Soviet and Russian rock band
- Autograph Records, an American jazz record label
- Autograph (album), a 1980 album by John Denver, or the title track
- Autografh, a 2007 album by the American rapper Grafh
- Autograph, an album by Andraé Crouch
- Auto-Graph EP by Le Car
- "Autograph" (song), a 2016 song by Dallas Smith
- "Autographs", a song by Reks from the 2012 album Straight, No Chaser

== Other uses ==
- Autograph ABP, previously known as the Association of Black Photographers, a British-based photographic arts agency
- Autograph (brand), a Marks & Spencer brand
- Autograph Collection, chain of hotels within the Marriott International brand
- Autograph (company), an NFT startup by quarterback Tom Brady
- Autograph (gallery), a gallery of contemporary art in Yekaterinburg

== See also ==
- Autograft, autotransplantation or grafting of tissues, organs, proteins
- Autografh, album by Grafh
