= Autograph (manuscript) =

Manuscript or document written in the author's handwriting

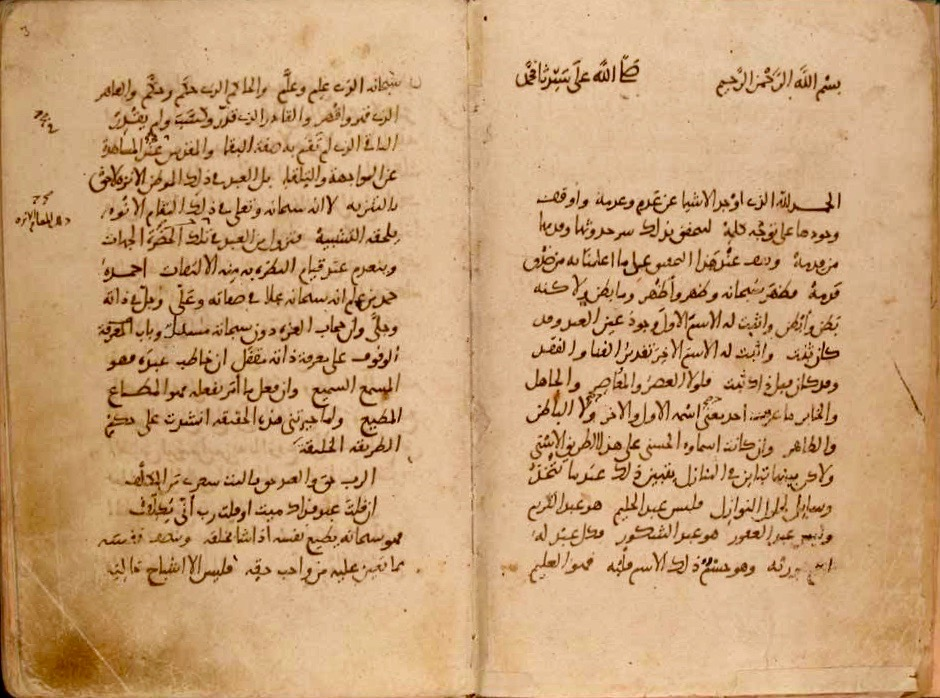
The opening pages of the Konya Manuscript of the Meccan Revelations, handwritten by Ibn Arabi in the 13th century

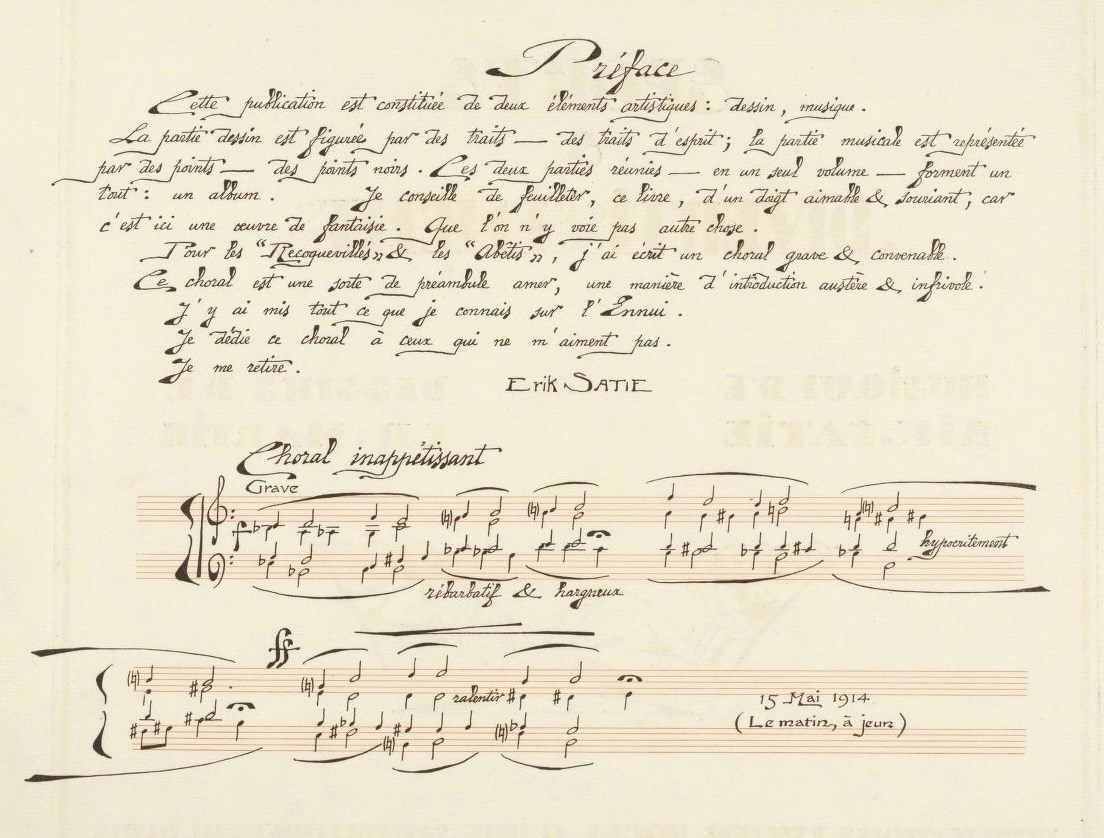
"Préface" (preface) and "Choral inappétissant" (unsavoury chorale), first page of Satie's autograph of Sports et divertissements (dated 15 May 1914)

An autograph or holograph is a manuscript or document written in its author's or composer's hand. The meaning of "autograph" as a document penned entirely by the author of its content (as opposed to a typeset document or one written by a copyist or scribe other than the author) overlaps with that of "holograph".

Autograph manuscripts are studied by scholars (such as historians and paleographers), and can become collectable objects. Holographic documents have, in some jurisdictions, a specific legal standing.

Related terms include archetype (the hypothesised form of an autograph), and protograph (the common ancestor of two closely related witnesses which ultimately descended from the same autograph). For example, the Novgorodsko-Sofiysky Svod is the hypothetical protograph of the Novgorod Fourth Chronicle (NPL) and Sofia First Chronicle, both of which are extant textual witnesses of the lost archetype, the Primary Chronicle (PVL). A paradosis is a proposed best-reading, postulated when attempting to reconstruct the autograph.

== Terminology ==
According to The Oxford English Minidictionary, an autograph is, apart from its meaning as a signature, a "manuscript in the author's handwriting", while a holograph is a "(document) written wholly in the handwriting of the person in whose name it appears".

In the 1911 edition of the Encyclopædia Britannica, Edward Maunde Thompson gives two common meanings of the word autograph as it applies to documents: "a document signed by the person from whom it emanates" and "one written entirely in the hand of such a person", noting that the latter is "more technically described as a holograph".

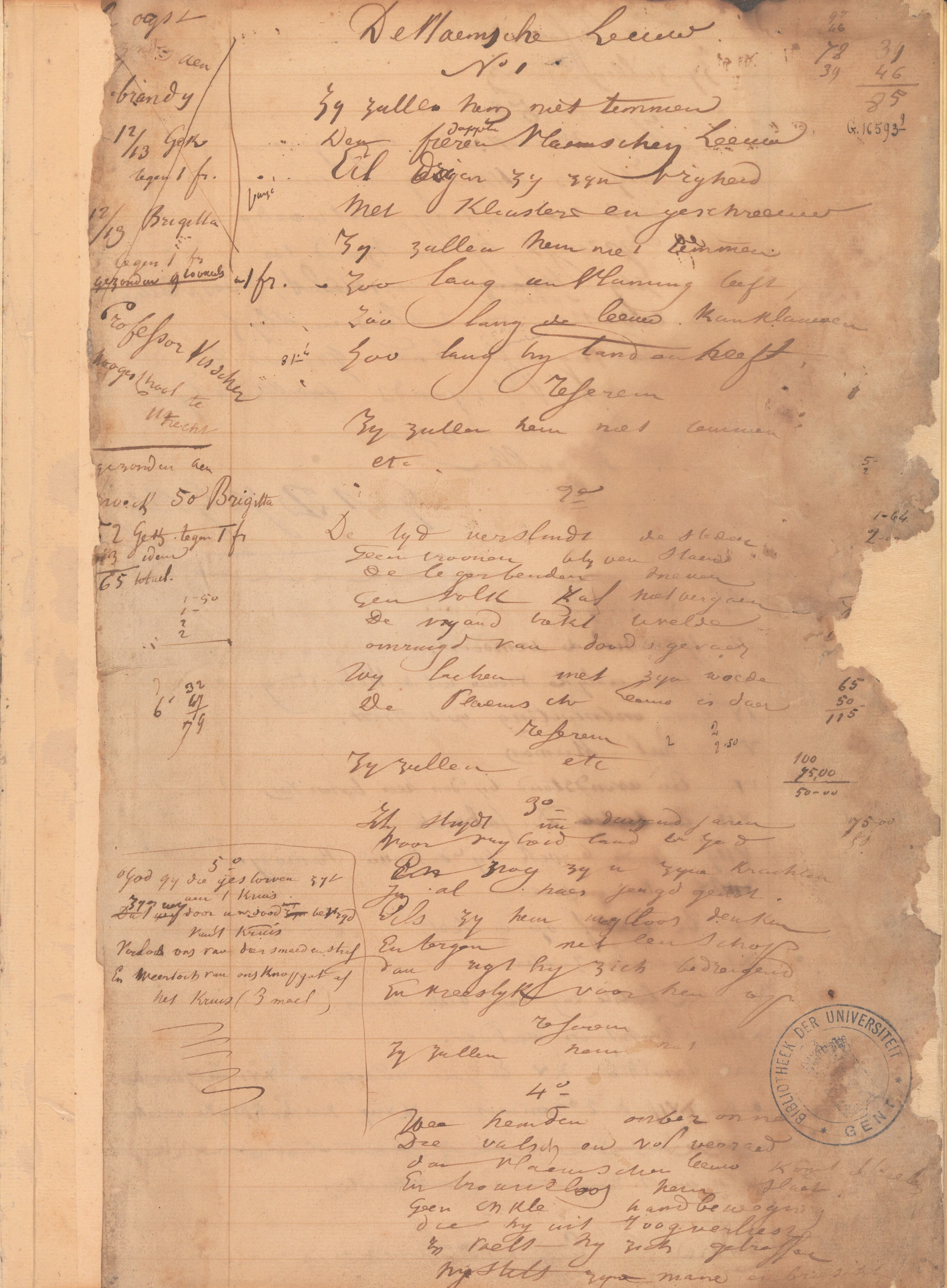
Hippoliet Van Peene's autograph of the lyrics of "De Vlaamse Leeuw" (22 July 1845)

In Webster's Third New International Dictionary, the definitions are:

^{1}autograph
1: something that is written with one's own hand: a: an original handwritten manuscript (as of an author's or composer's work) ⟨valuable old ~s of Dickens⟩ [p. 147]
^{1}holograph
: a document (as a letter, deed, or will) wholly in the handwriting of the person from whom it proceeds and whose act it purports to be [p. 1081]

According to Stanley Boorman in The New Grove Dictionary of Music and Musicians:

Holograph
A document written in the hand of the author or composer. This distinguishes it from the more commonly used word, Autograph, for the latter, strictly, means merely that the document is written by someone who can be named.

Boorman describes the manuscripts handwritten by a composer as including holographs (copies of their own work) and autographs (copies of the works of other composers). He notes that this distinction is rarely made by "antiquarian dealers or auctioneers", but says that scribes and copyists often included other composers and so identifying them and their autographs can be useful for people studying their works.

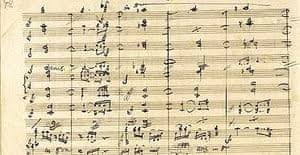
Beethoven's final score of his ninth symphony: partial autograph, of the "non-autograph copy with autograph corrections" type

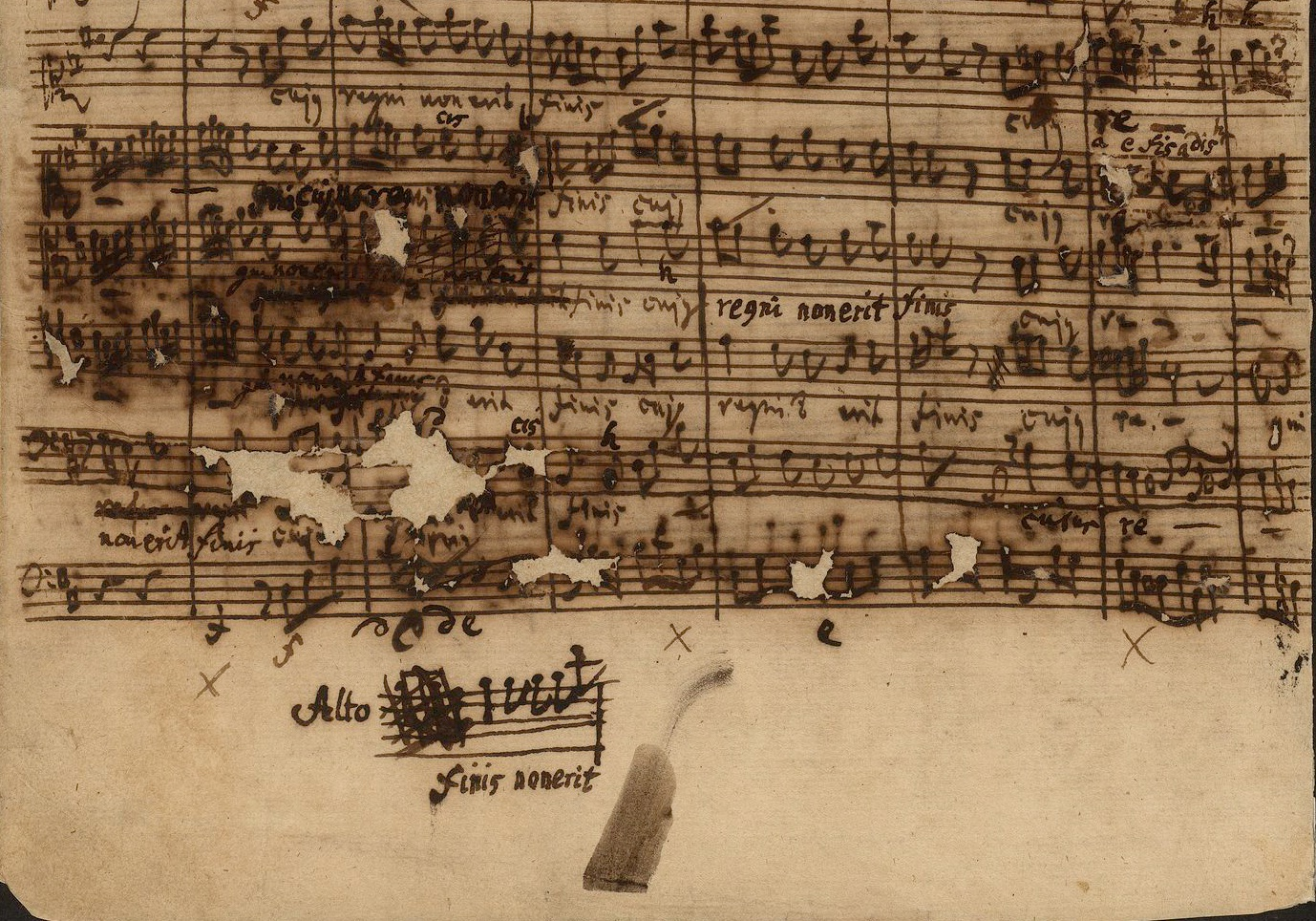
In 2009 Uwe Wolf reported about the X-ray technology he had used on the (D-B) Mus.ms. Bach P 180 manuscript, to distinguish J. S. Bach's autograph composition from later revisions by his son C. P. E.

According to Yō Tomita, writing in The Routledge Research Companion to Johann Sebastian Bach, "autograph" and "holograph" can be considered synonyms (i.e., a manuscript for which the writer is the author of the work), the former term being generally preferred in studies of manuscripts. Further, he writes that Bach's copies of compositions by other composers "should never be referred to as Bach's autographs, even if they are entirely in Bach's handwriting." He distinguishes two types of partial autographs: the first being written by a set of scribes, including the composer, the second being a copy made by a scribe other than the composer, to which the composer, in a later stage, applied editorial corrections and/or other modifications. According to Tomita, manuscripts of straightforward transcriptions should be referred to as "copy" or "transcription manuscript", while more convoluted arrangements should be referred to as an "autograph" rather than a "copy". In Bach scholarship, "original manuscript" refers to a score or performance parts written (by himself or his scribes) for the composer's own use.

In what follows the terms "autograph" and "holograph" are used as quoted in the sources indicated by the footnoted references. When these sources only use a description, such as "in the author's handwriting" or "written in the hand of the author", then, following Webster's, "autograph" is used for a "manuscript (as of an author's or composer's work)" and "holograph" for a "document (as a letter, deed, or will)", and either of these terms only when the explicitly named scribe of the manuscript or document is also the creator of its content. For instance:

- If the RISM page used as reference for the (D-B) Mus.ms. Bach P 180 manuscript describes that object as an "autograph" (by Johann Sebastian Bach), then that qualification is not changed to holograph: the context is clear, i.e. written and composed by J. S. Bach, even if this handwritten score was, in 1786, partially altered and completed for performance by the composer's son C. P. E. Bach.
- In the second half of the 19th century, Wilhelm Rust compiled a score from a composite 18th-century manuscript, partially in J. S. Bach's hand, of the Jesus Christus ist um unsrer Missetat willen verwundet St Mark Passion. None of the available descriptions at the Bach Digital and RISM websites qualify either of these 18th- and 19th-century manuscripts as either autograph or holograph, nor by Bach, nor by Rust, but as versions of a work by another composer dubbed "Keiser". The 18th-century manuscript can however be indicated as an "original source" according to the Bach Digital page on the Weimar version of this Passion.

Autograph letters which are not in the handwriting of the person from whom they emanate, and perhaps only bear the signature of their author, such as in the Vatican usage of the term, are not further considered in this article about autograph manuscripts.

== Text ==
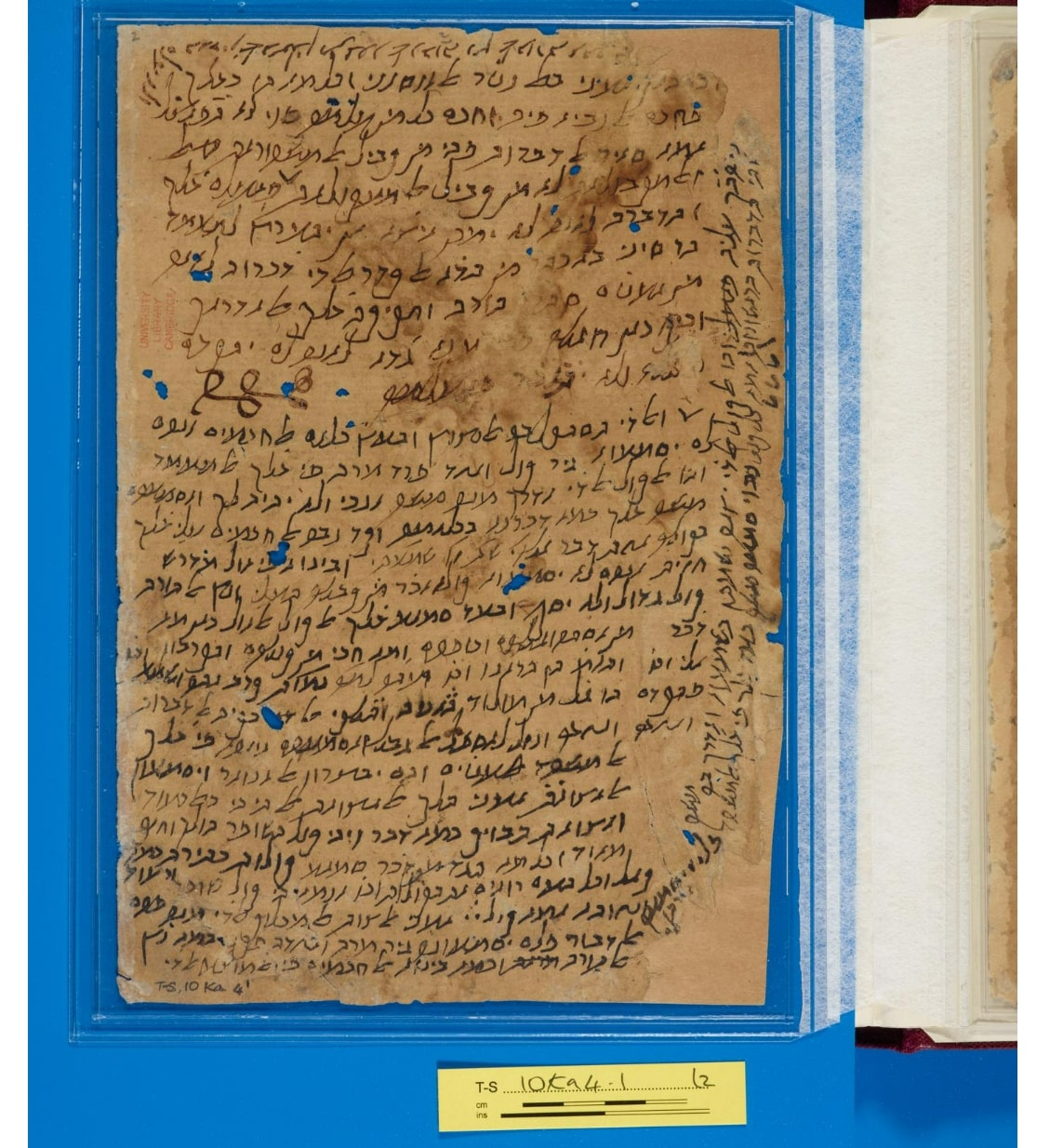
An autograph fragment of Maimonides' Guide for the Perplexed, from the Cairo Geniza

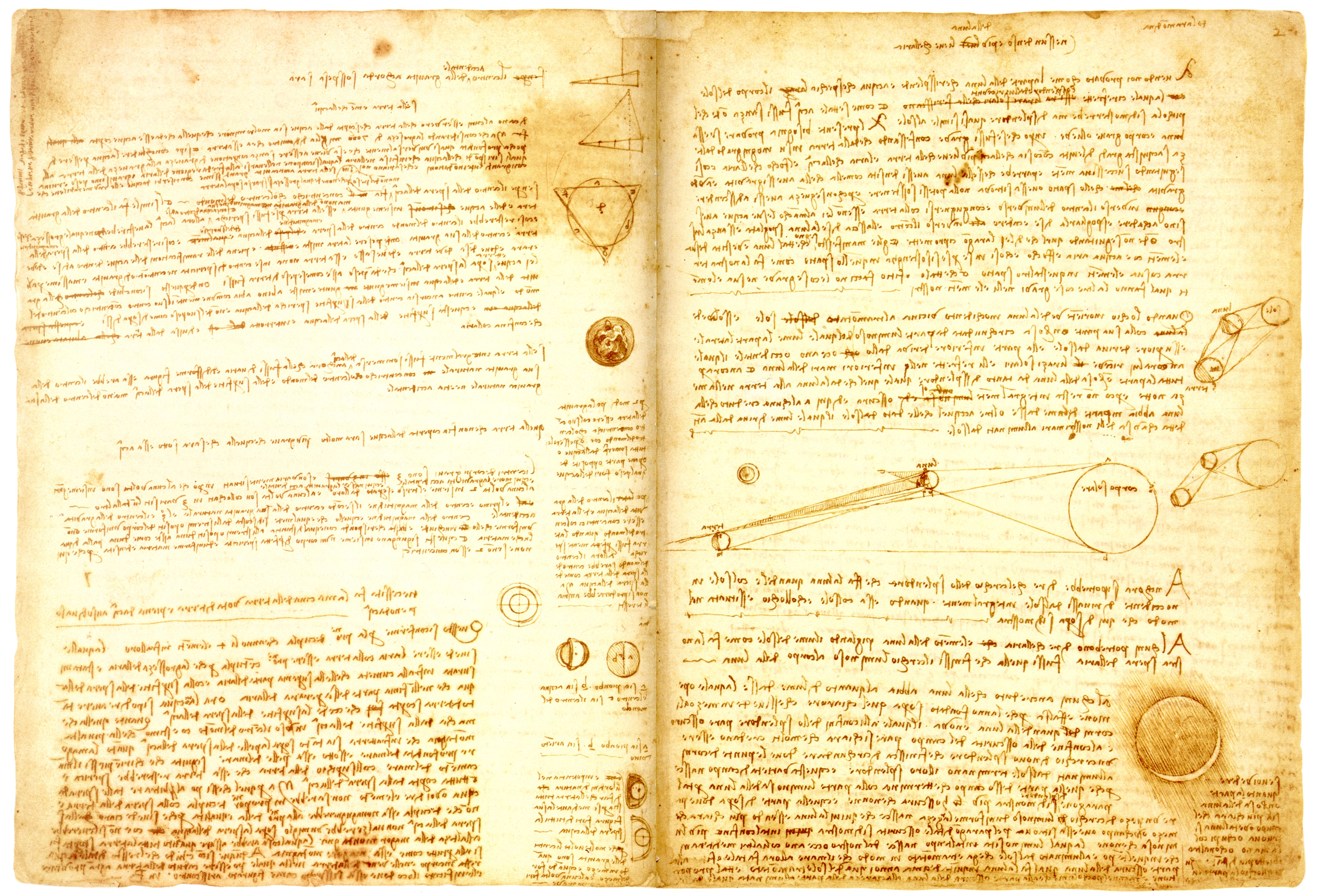
Two pages from the Codex Leicester, a manuscript by Leonardo da Vinci

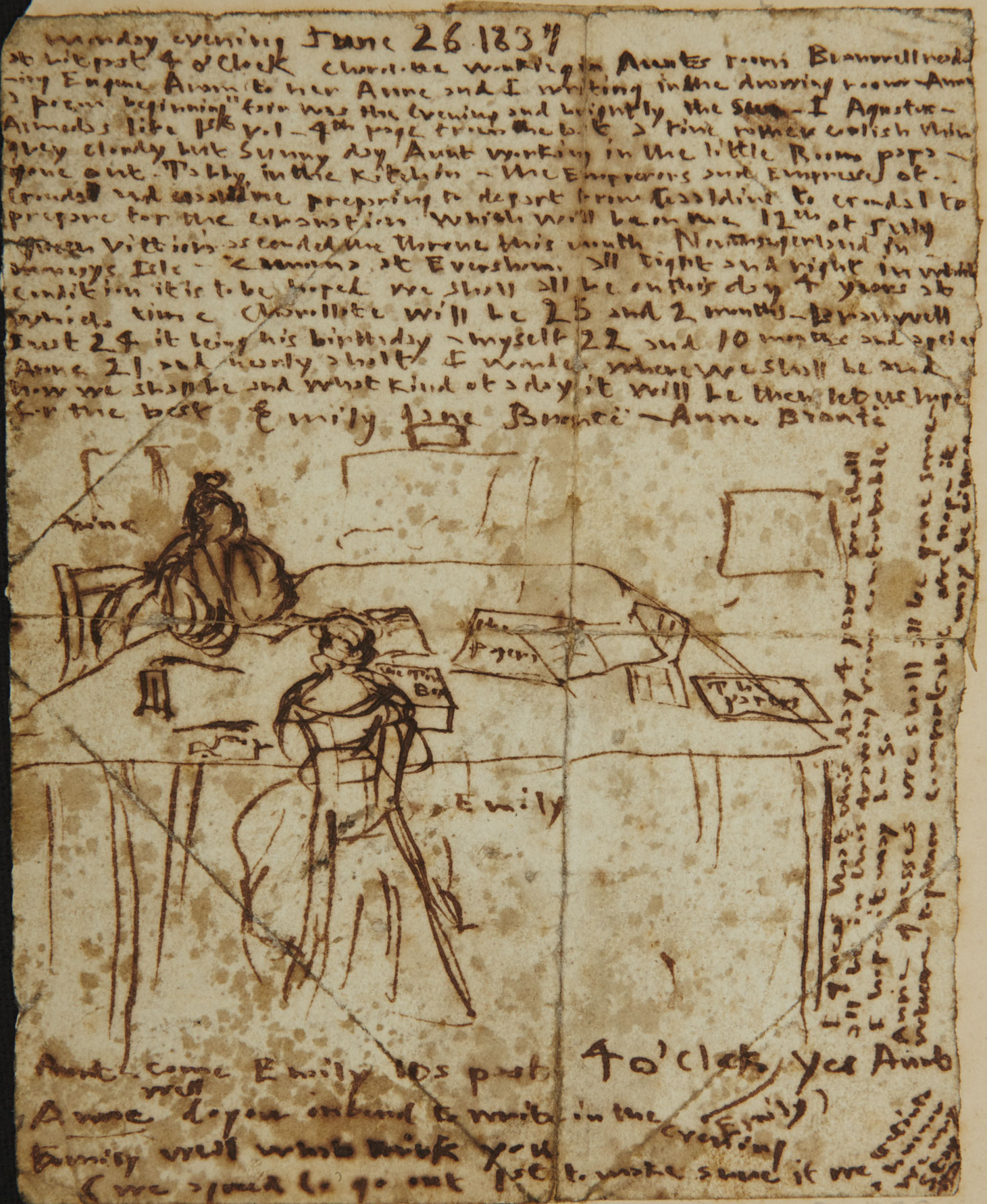
Emily Brontë's diary (26 June 1837)

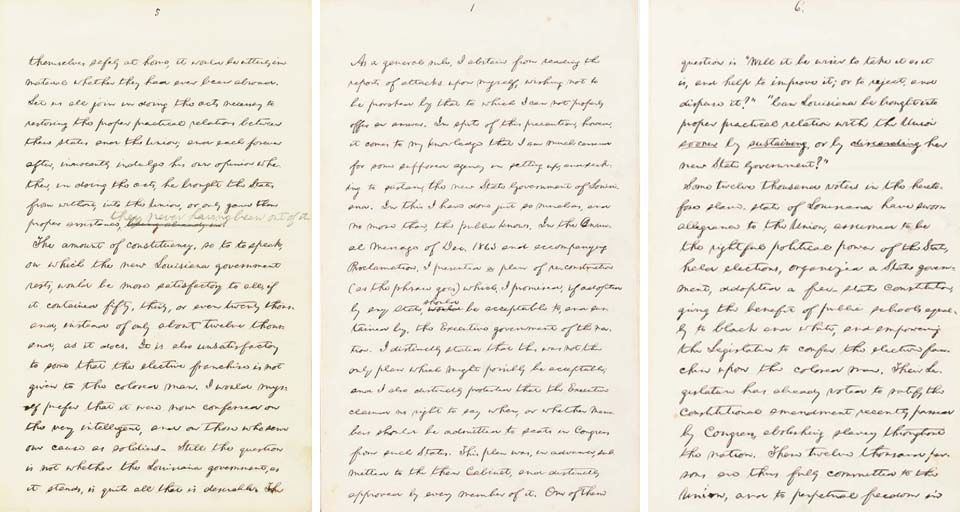
Lincoln's 1865 last address as president

Autograph text, with or without drawn illustrations, or calculations, remains from many authors, from different eras, including:

Middle Ages

- Matthew of Aquasparta.

Renaissance

- Leonardo da Vinci.
- Martin Luther.

17th century

- Cardinal Richelieu.
- John Dryden.

18th century

- Johann Sebastian Bach's autograph report on the state of his choir and orchestra in Leipzig has been studied in the context of Historically informed performance practice, and his autograph letters to Georg Erdmann in the context of his biography.
- Voltaire.

19th century

- Mary and Percy Bysshe Shelley.
- Jane Austen.
- Brontë sisters and their brother Branwell.
- Abraham Lincoln.

20th century

- André Breton.
- Béla Bartók's autograph calculations have been the subject of minute analysis: a hypothesis, proposed by Ernő Lendvai and others in the 3rd quarter of the 20th century, that the composer would have deliberately planned the proportions of his compositions according to golden ratio principles, using the Fibonacci sequence, was rejected in later scholarship for the absence of any such calculation in the many computational notes left by the composer.
- Albert Einstein.
- Francis Crick.
- J. R. R. Tolkien's autographs have been the object of critical studies. An autograph page by Tolkien sold for US$81,250 in December 2018. Also autograph letters by Tolkien have come up at auction.
- Bob Dylan.

21st century

- One of seven autograph copies of J. K. Rowling's The Tales of Beedle the Bard sold for £1,950,000 in 2007.

== Music ==
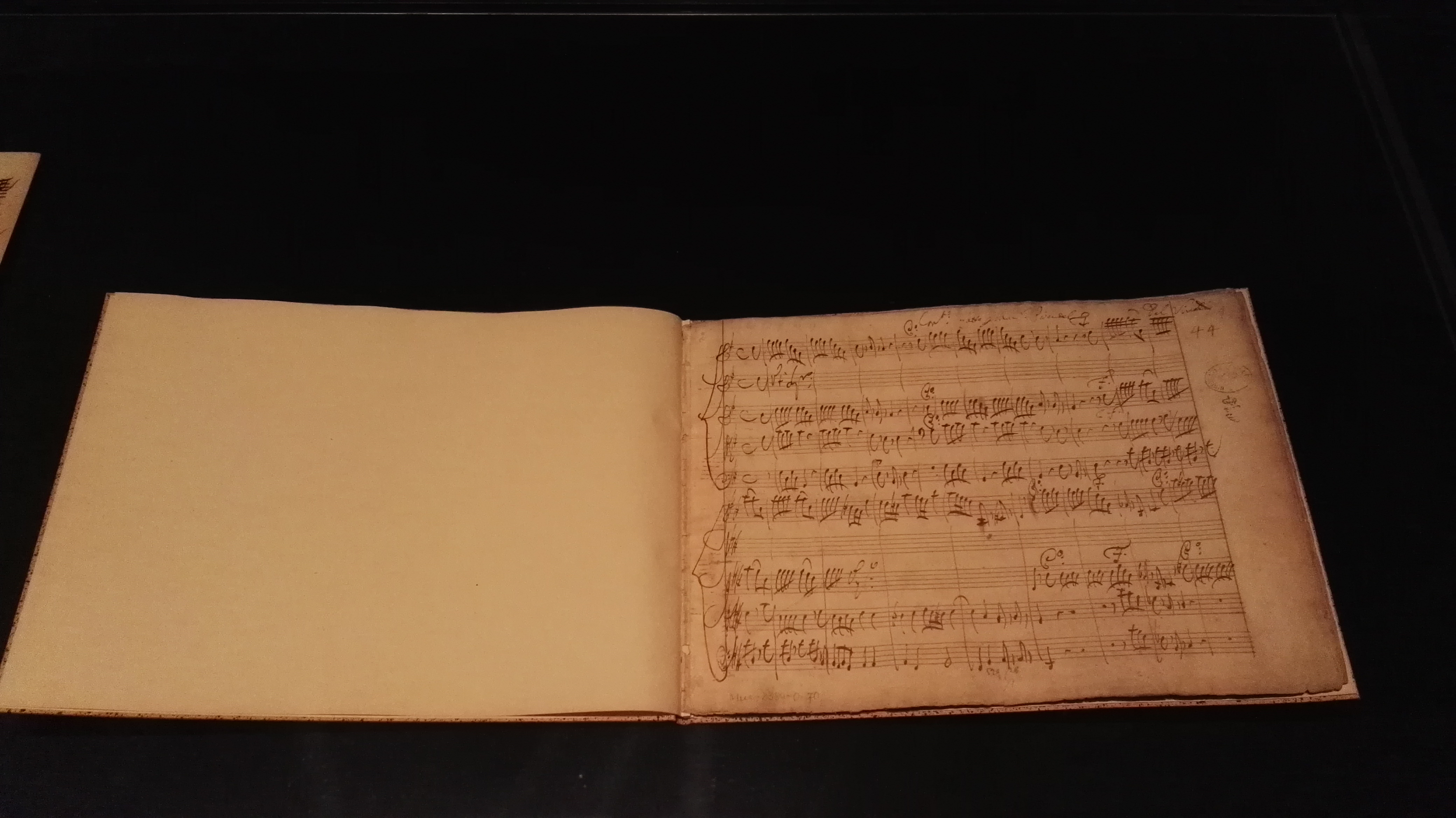
Vivaldi's autograph of RV 314, displayed in the Buchmuseum (SLUB Dresden)

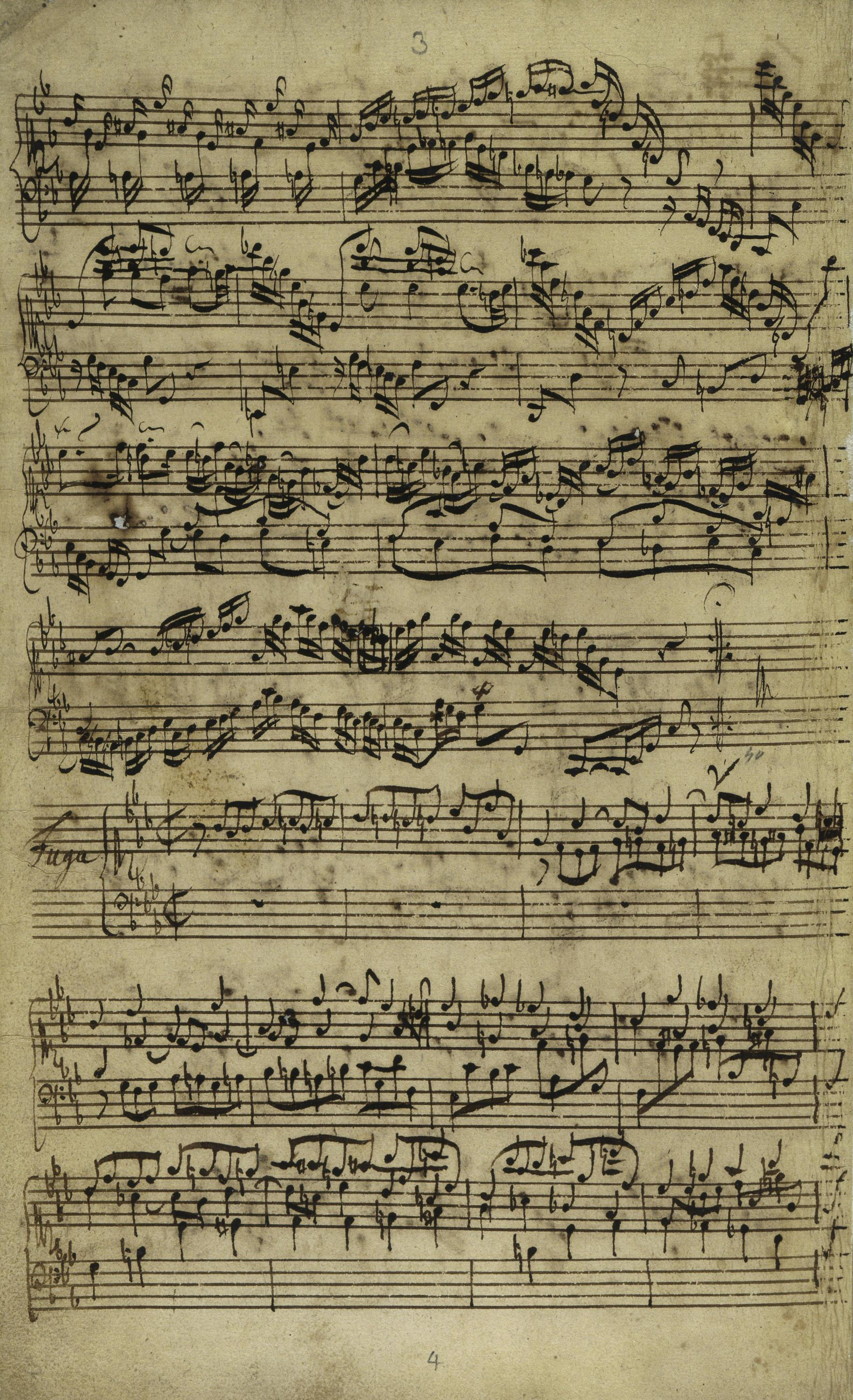
Third page of Bach's autograph of the Fantasia and Fugue in C minor, BWV 906 (start of Fugue shown): before the discovery of this manuscript in 1876, the Fugue could not be authenticated as Bach's.

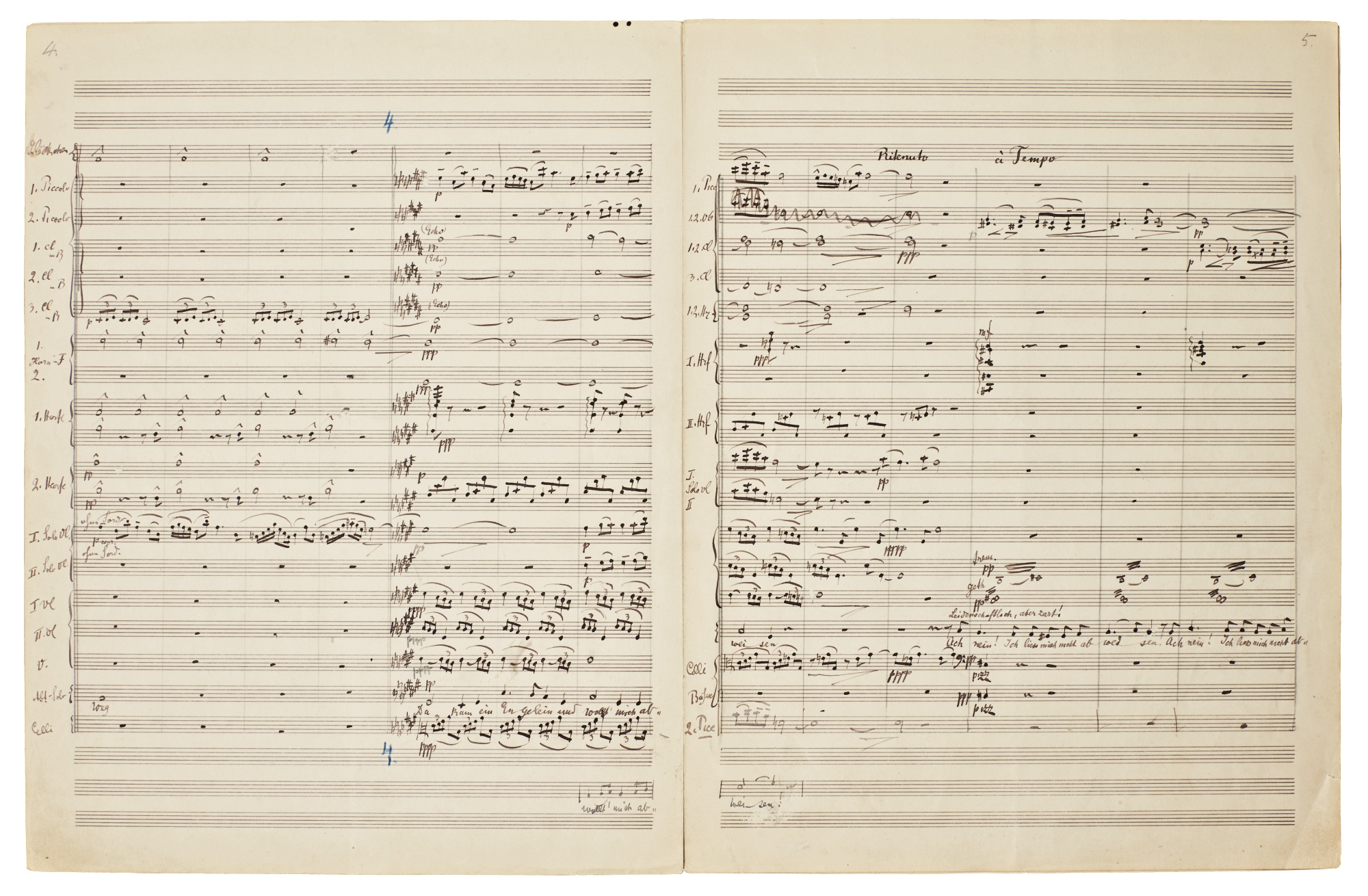
Mahler's autograph of his second symphony, sold for a record sum in 2016

Musical autographs exist in various stages of completion:

- Sketch, indicating musical ideas written down in the early stages of a composition process, often not more than a few bars of music (e.g. Schubert's D 309A and D 769A survived as autograph sketches).
- Draft, which can contain corrections, and is not necessarily a complete composition (e.g. the autograph of Schubert's D 840 is an incomplete draft of a four-movement piano sonata).
- Composing score (e.g. autograph composing scores survive for several of Bach's cantatas).
- Fair copy, written out clear enough to be used for performance or publication of the music. Fair copies are not necessarily written by the composer, but if the composer has some control over the process of copying, and possibly adds some corrections or completions in his own hand, the fair copy may still be considered an original source (e.g. Bach's partial autograph of the BWV 210 cantata is a fair copy which is considered an original source). For pieces with multiple performers, apart from the score itself, also performance parts (i.e. sheet music for individual performers), may exist as autographs, as partial autographs or as copies by others, and would usually be fair copies although earlier stages of such parts may exist (e.g. D-Dl Mus. 2405-D-21 is a set of partial autograph performance parts of Bach's 1733 Mass for the Dresden court).

Intermediate stages are possible, for instance Wagner's method of composition entailed several sketch and draft stages, and a first stage of the complete score (Partiturerstschrift) before the fair copy. Other composers used fewer steps: for his cantatas, Bach apparently often started directly with the composing score (with some sketches and drafts written in that score while composing), without, in the end, always transferring such score to a fair copy. Sometimes, however, he started with the transcription of an earlier work, which developed in a revision score, before being transferred to a fair copy. Or otherwise, a revision manuscript could be turned into performance material for a rewritten work: D-B Mus.ms. Bach St 112 VI, Fascicle 1, a partially autograph bundle of performance parts for the last cantata of Bach's Christmas Oratorio, contains four parts which are revision versions originally written for an otherwise undocumented cantata (BWV 248 VI a).

Sometimes a composer's autograph starts as a fair copy, continuing as a draft. For example, the Fantasia in the late 1730s autograph of Fantasia and Fugue in C minor, BWV 906, is a fair copy, but halfway through the (likely incomplete) Fugue the manuscript gradually shifts to a draft with several corrections.

=== Scholarship ===
Scholarly studies of autographs can help in establishing authenticity or date of origin of a composition. Autographs, and fair copies produced with the assistance of scribes, can also be studied to detect a composer's true intentions. For instance, John Tyrrell argued that Janáček's autograph score of his last opera was less authoritative as the final state of that opera than the fair copy by the composer's scribes, produced under his direction and with his corrections.

=== As collectable object ===
Bach's autograph compositions are rarely available for private collectors: the bulk of his hundreds of extant autographs resides at the Berlin State Library, while only a fourth of 40 complete autograph manuscripts outside that collection are privately owned. One of such exceptional autographs, that came up for auction in 2016, fetched over £2.5m.

Ludwig van Beethoven's autographs have, since a few months after the composer's death in 1827, been sold for considerable prices at auctions. Beethoven's autograph of the Große Fuge (version for four hands) sold for £1.1m at Sotheby's in 2005. In November 2016 the autograph score of a Mahler symphony sold for £4,546,250: no autograph symphony had ever sold for a higher price.

== Holographic documents ==
A holograph is a document written entirely in the handwriting of the person whose signature it bears. Some countries (e.g. France) or local jurisdictions within certain countries (e.g. some U.S. states) give legal standing to specific types of holographic documents, generally waiving requirements that they be witnessed. One of the most important types of such documents are holographic last wills.

In fiction, The Ardua Hall Holograph, handwritten by Aunt Lydia, plays a central role in Margaret Atwood's novel, The Testaments (2019).

== See also ==
- List of most expensive books and manuscripts
