= Lucas Osiander the Elder =

German Lutheran pastor (1534–1604)

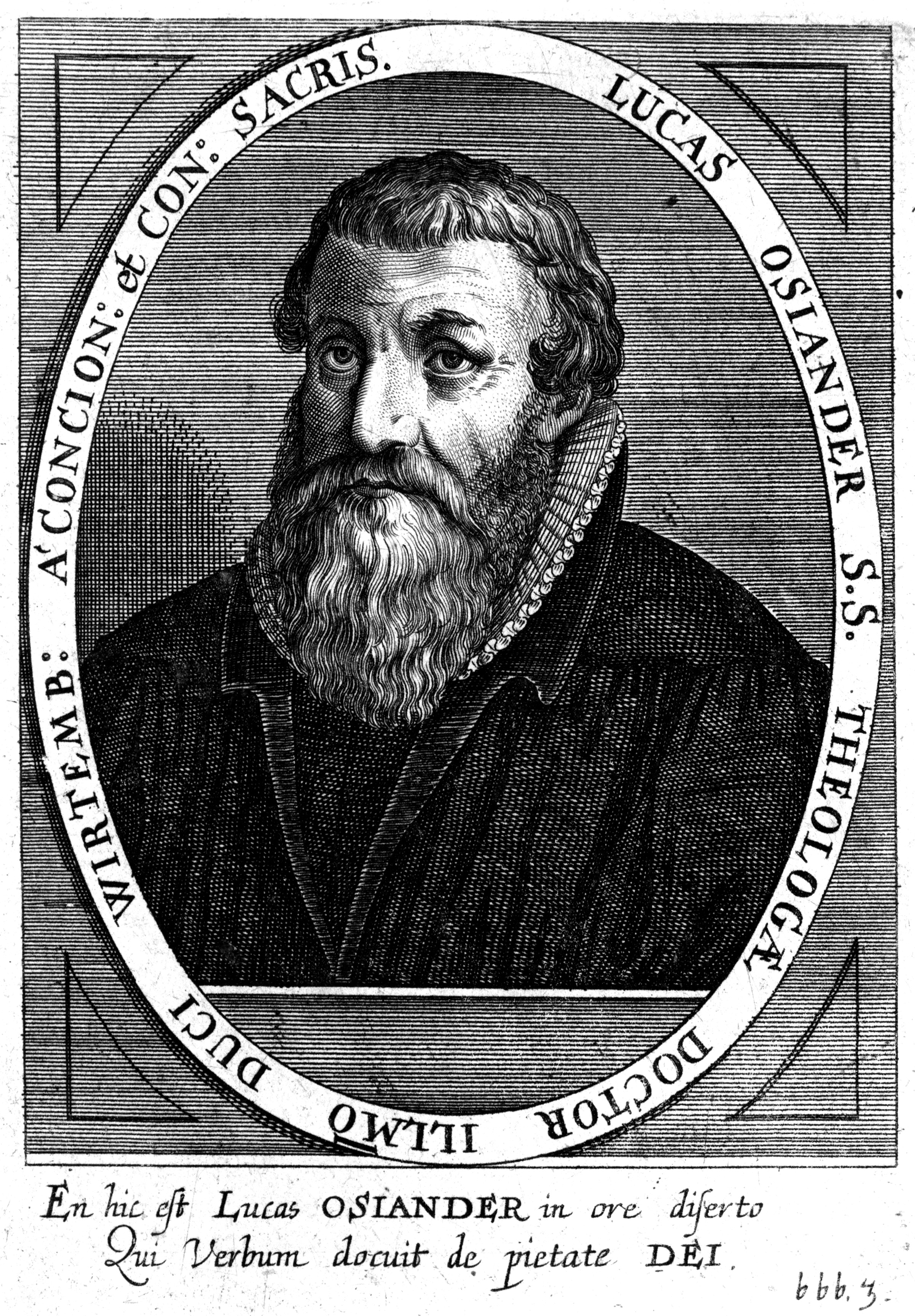
Lucas Osiander the Elder

Lucas Osiander the Elder (15 December 1534, in Nuremberg – 17 September 1604, in Stuttgart) was a German pastor of the Evangelical-Lutheran Church in Württemberg and a composer of Lutheran church music. He was a son of the reformer Andreas Osiander. He was also the father of Lucas Osiander the Younger.

== Life ==
Encouraged to study at an early age by his parents, the young Osiander went to school in Nuremberg and then went on to study at the University of Königsberg in East Prussia. In 1555 he became a deacon in Göppingen, in 1558 he became a pastor and superintendent in Blaubeuren, and in 1563 Pastor of the Leonhardskirche in Stuttgart.

At this time a shift in church polity was under way, and in 1569 Osiander was appointed royal court chaplain to the Duchy of Württemberg and made a member of the Church Consistory. In the same year, he was credited as a co-editor of Sigmund Hemmel's Psalter. He was involved in the preparation of the Lutheran Formula of Concord. Together with Jakob Heerbrand, published the first Latin translation. In 1583 he was awarded a doctorate in Theology at the University of Tübingen. He became Abbot (Superintendent) and Prelate at Adelberg Abbey in 1596. Dismissed from this position in 1598, Osiander worked briefly as a preacher in Esslingen am Neckar, but returned to Adelberg after one year.

Equally well-versed in theology and music, Lucas Osiander initiated the first Württemberg hymnal of 1583. He also set to music the main body of Reformation hymnody as a Cantional (collection of songs) in 1586 to give the lay community the opportunity to join in figural music (a type of polyphonic singing). The text of the Lutheran hymn, Gott Vater, Herr, wir danken dir (Evangelisches Gesangbuch, Württemberg Regional Edition, Nr. 557) probably originated from Osiander.

Lucas Osiander's Bible commentary was incorporated into his father's so-called Osiander Bible. This plain-text Bible, based on Martin Luther's translation was published by the Stern Press in Lüneburg from 1650.

== Family ==
After 1554, he married widow Margarethe Entringer Lesyer, and became the stepfather of Polykarp Leyser the Elder.

== Bibliography ==
- Roth, Fritz. "Vol 2, 1592". Restlose Auswertungen von Leichenpredigten und Personalschriften für genealogische und kulturhistorische Zwecke.
- Schott, Theodor (1887). "Osiander, Lucas (I.).". Allgemeine Deutsche Biographie vol. 24. Leipzig: Duncker & Humblot. pp. 493–495.
- Ehmer, Hermann (1993). "Osiander". Realencyklopädie für protestantische Theologie und Kirche, Vol. 14 (3rd ed.). Herzberg: Bautz. pp. 1299–130. ISBN 3-88309-044-1.
- Wagenmann, Bossert (1904). "Osiander". Realencyklopädie für protestantische Theologie und Kirche, Vol. 14 (3rd ed.). Leipzig: Hinrichs. pp. 509–512.
- "Entry". Zedlers Universallexikon. Vol. 25. p. 1068.
