= Michel Chodkiewicz =

French author and Sufi scholar (1929–2020)

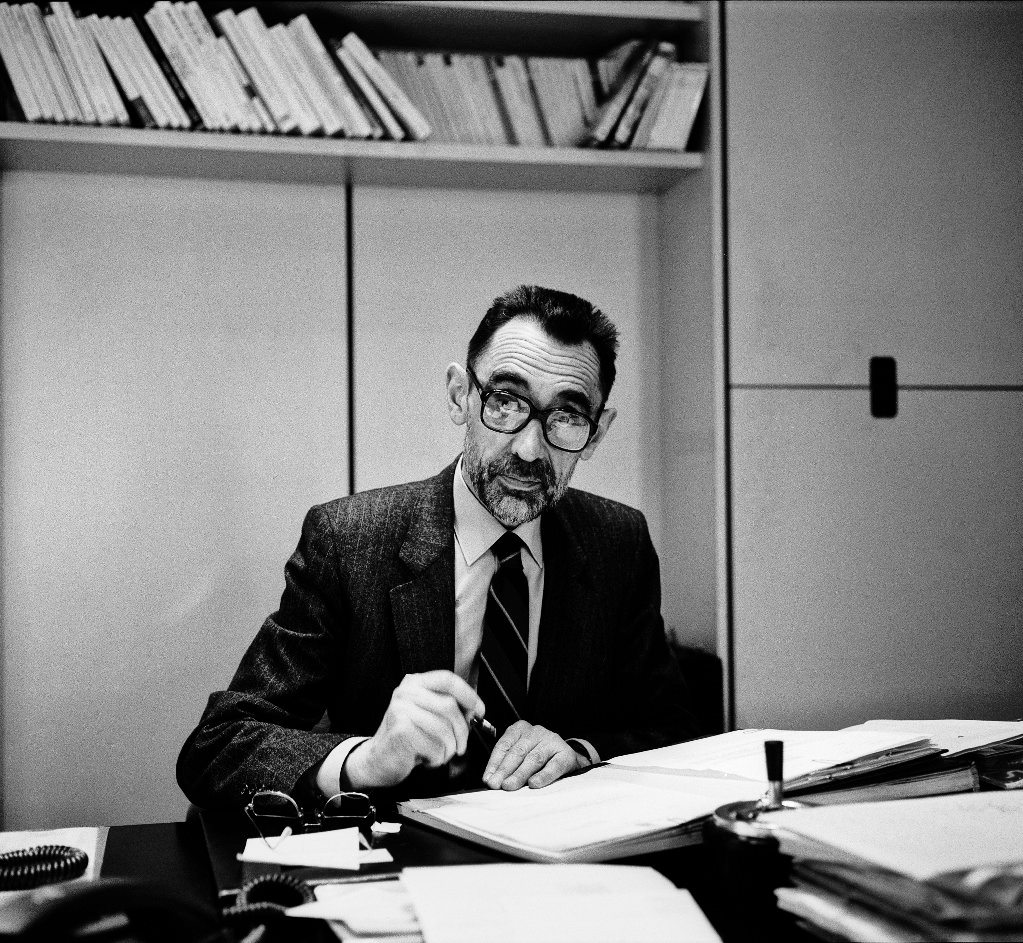
- Chodkiewicz at Editions du Seuil, 1987
- Born: 13 May 1929; Paris, French Third Republic
- Died: 31 March 2020 (aged 90); Les Hauts-d'Anjou, French Fifth Republic
- Known for: Scholar of Sufism
- Children: Claude Addas

Michel Chodkiewicz (13 May 1929 – 31 March 2020) was a French scholar of Sufism, particularly the works of Ibn 'Arabi.

== Biography ==
Michel Chodkiewicz was from the Chodkiewicz family, a szlachta family of the Polish aristocracy who settled in France in 1832. He was born in Paris in 1929 and completed most of his education there. Chodkiewicz converted to Islam from Roman Catholicism at age 17. He began studying Ibn 'Arabi under the Romanian traditionalist Michel Valsan.

He served as Director-General and then President and CEO of Editions du Seuil from 1977 to 1989. In 1982, he became director of studies at the Ecole des Hautes Etudes en Sciences Sociales where he conducted seminars on Ibn 'Arabi and Abd al-Karim al-Jili.

He died 31 March 2020 in the town of Les Hauts-d'Anjou.

== Publications ==
- Émir Abd el-Kader, Écrits spirituels, presentation, translation and notes, Seuil, 1982; reprint 1994.
- Awhad al-Din Balyani, Épître sur l'Unicité absolue, presentation, translation and notes, Les Deux Océans, 1982.
- Le Sceau des Saints, Prophétie et Sainteté dans la doctrine d'Ibn 'Arabî, Éditions Gallimard, 1986; reprint 2012.
- Ibn 'Arabî, Les Illuminations de La Mecque, texts chosen from al-Futûhât al-Makkîya (in collaboration with W.C. Chittick, C. Chodkiewicz, D. Gril and J.W. Morris), Sindbad, 1988; reprint with subtitle Anthologie présentée par Michel Chodkiewicz, Albin Michel/Spiritualités vivantes, 2008.
- Un Océan sans rivage. Ibn 'Arabî, le Livre et la Loi, Éditions du Seuil, 1992.

=== Translations ===
- The Spiritual Writings of Amir 'Abd al-Kader (1982).
- The Seal of the Saints: Prophethood and Sainthood in the Doctrine of Ibn Arabi (1986).
- Ibn 'Arabî: The Meccan Revelations (translation of selected chapters, 1988)
- An Ocean Without Shore: Ibn Arabi, the Book, and the Law (1992)

== See also ==
- Michel Chodkiewicz 1929–2020 at The Muhyiddin Ibn ‘Arabi Society (MIAS).
