= Misha Brusilovsky =

Russian painter

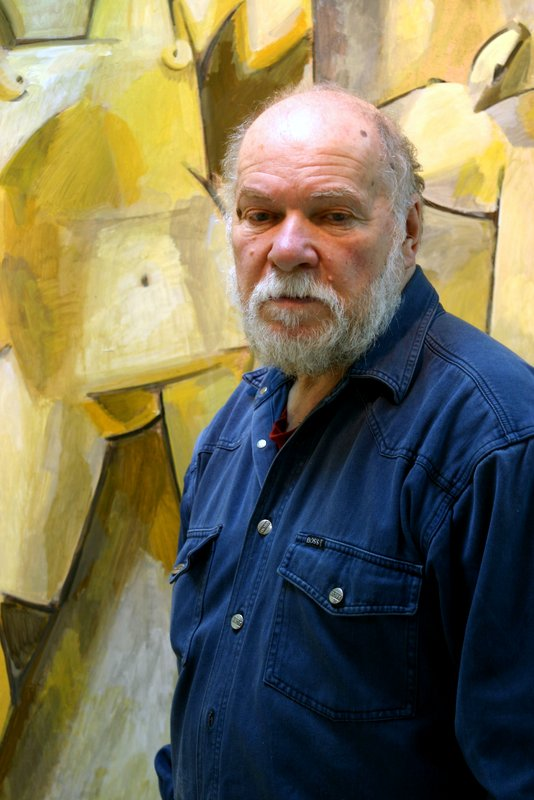
- Born: Mikhail Brussilovsky; 7 May 1931; Kiev, Ukraine
- Died: 3 November 2016 (aged 85); Yekaterinburg, Russia
- Education: Repin Institute of Arts
- Known for: Painting
- Awards: Honoured artist of the Russian Federation

Misha Brusilovsky (born Mikhail Brussilovsky; 7 May 1931 – 3 November 2016) was a Russian artist, painter and graphic artist. He was a Member of the Russian union of artists, an honored artist of the Russian Federation, a distinguished member of Russian Academy of Arts, a laureate of the "G. S. Mosin prize" and a winner of the Sverdlovsk region Governor's prize "For outstanding achievements in literature and art".

== Biography ==
=== Childhood ===
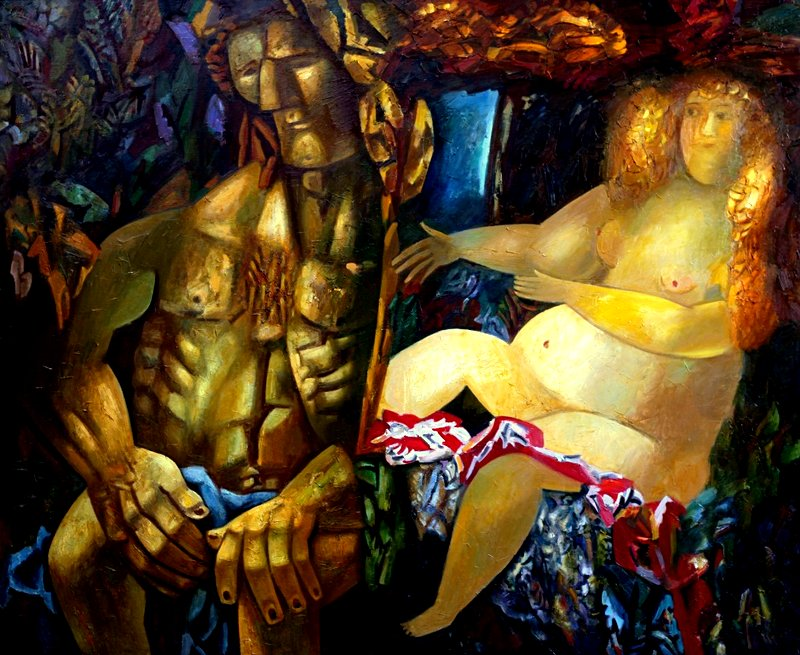
"Samson and Delilah". 150х120. Canvas, oil. 2008.

Misha Brusilovsky was born on 7 May 1931 in Kiev. His father, Shaya Shevelevich Brusilovsky (1904–43), was a military engineer who was killed in the war, and his mother, Frida Abramovna Goldberg (1906–89), worked in trade. He had one brother Seva – Vsevolod Brusilovsky (born 1936).

In 1938 Misha's father was sent on an extended mission to the Far East, where he went with his whole family. They lived on the In Station in Birakan and Birobidzhan. At the beginning of 1941 the Brusilovsky family returned to Kiev, and the war broke out that June. Misha and his brother Seva were sent to the town of Troitsk in the South Urals to their aunt Raya, their father's sister. Their father went to the front, and their mother stayed in Kiev and joined them later. In 1943, their aunt Raya, a general practitioner and surgeon, was mobilised, and Misha went with her on a medical train. On the medical train he helped the doctors and the injured, and when it would stop for long periods he would go to the nearest villages to exchange salt for groceries for them.

Six months later, Brusilovsky returned to Kiev, which had been liberated from Germany. In an attempt to earn some money, he joined a group of boys who shined shoes on the square in front of the train station. Every evening, a grown-up lad with the nickname Kot (Tomcat) would come to the square. He was connected with the local criminal class, and he would take most of the money the boys had earned. If they tried to hide what they had earned, the boys were dealt with harshly.

Once, for Kot's birthday, Misha drew his portrait with coloured pencils, and showed it to him. Kot took the drawing, and a while later he brought Brusilovsky to a boarding school for gifted children.

One day he came with a very young boy, gave him my box and all the stuff that went with it, and brought me away to a boarding school for gifted children. He walked in to the director's office without knocking, and the director said that they weren't taking in any more children, that we would have to show him some work I had done. Without speaking, Kot put a packet of money on the table and said that there would be no competition and God forbid if I didn't get in. I got in.

— Misha Brusilovsky,

In 1944, Brusilovsky started going to classes in the "Kiev boarding school for gifted children".

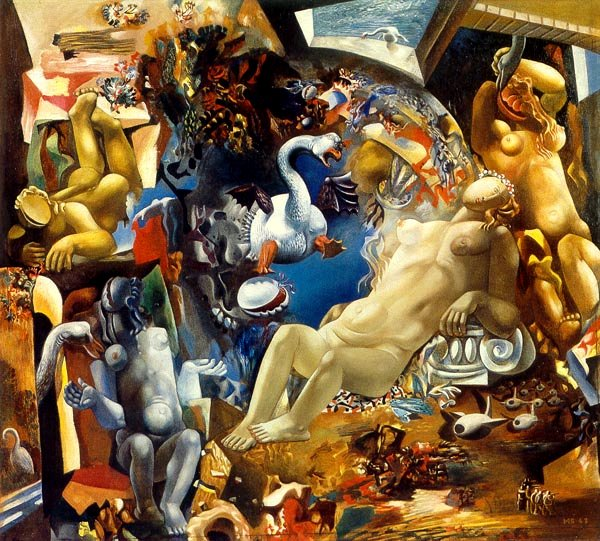
"Leda and the Swan". Canvas, oil. 89х99. 1967.

=== Studies ===
Brusilovsky spent one year in the boarding school for gifted children. In 1945, he got a place in the Kiev Shevchenko State Art School, which was situated at the time in the building of the Kiev Art Institute. In 1952, he graduated from the art school and applied to the Kiev Art Institute, but he did not get a place because admissions were strictly regulated according to ethnicity.

He began earning some money by making copies of pictures by well-known Soviet artists for palaces of culture and other similar state institutions.

In 1953, Brusilovsky went to Moscow. He worked as an artist and designer in the All-Russia Exhibition Centre but he decided to further his education and went to Leningrad, where he began studying in the Repin Institute of Painting, Sculpture and Architecture in the graphic design department. He studied with artists such as Ostap Shrub and Minas Avetisyan. He graduated from the Institute in 1959 (his thesis supervisor was Alexei Pakhomov) and then he was assigned a job in the city of Sverdlovsk.

=== Creative work ===
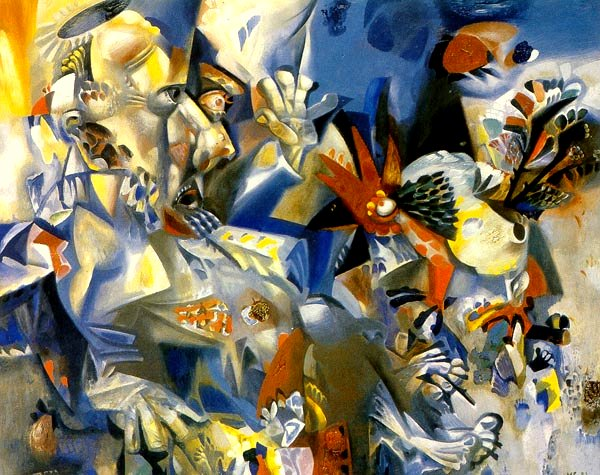
"The Denial of St. Peter". Canvas, oil. 86х105. 1982.

==== Sverdlovsk ====
In Sverdlovsk, Misha Brusilovsky began teaching drawing in Shadr Art College, and he also began working with the Central Ural Publishing House as an artist-illustrator. He met Vitaly Volovich, Herman Metelev, Andrei Antonov, Anatoly Kalashnikov and other Sverdlovsk artists, and he also met the artist Gennady Mosin with whom he had been friendly back in the Repin Institute. He worked with Mosin on mounted pictures. He also took orders for monumental pieces.

The chairperson of the Sverdlovsk Union of Artists A. G. Vyaznikov, who in the interests of his own career was waging a wide-scale war against formalism and some bureaucrats in the Sverdlovsk branch of the communist party had a negative reaction to Brusilovsky's work.

In 1961, for Brusilovsky's thirtieth birthday, the Sverdlovsk Union of Artists organised an exhibition of painting and graphic art in the Sverdlovsk House of the Artist, together with an exhibition of another Sverdlovsk artist K. Zyumbilov. On 10 May 1961, the newspaper "The Ural Worker", in "The audience responds" column, published a note by the name of "An unnecessary enterprise", signed by a certain "public servant N. Efimov" in which all of Brusilovsky's pieces which had been presented at the exhibition came under criticism.

Placed on page two of the newspaper, amidst coverage of the forthcoming 22nd Congress of the Communist Party of the Soviet Union, it vividly demonstrated how important it was for the Sverdlovsk authorities that this graduate of the Leningrad Repin Institute of Arts, Brusilovsky, a Kievan by origin, be expelled from the Ural arts scene.

— Aleksandr Ryumin,

==== The painting "1918" ====
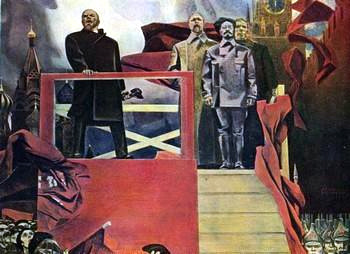
"1918". Canvas, oil. 294х398. 1963 – 1964.

In 1962 Brusilovsky began working in collaboration with Gennady Mosin on the painting "1918". The decision to paint the painting was a provocation to the chairman of the Union of Artists RSFSR Vladimir Serov, who did Historical-Revolutionary paintings and specialised in portrayals of Lenin.

Gena did not like Serov: "arts Commander-in-Chief of the USSR", a member of the Central Committee of the CPSU. Mosin said to me: "Let’s do a painting that Serov will not like". But there was a canonical portrayal of Lenin – as a good, sweet grandfather. And only certain people were permitted to paint the leader. Gena drew the sketch without signing a contract.

— Misha Brusilovsky,

In 1963 a sketch of the painting was presented to the arts board of the organising committee of the "Socialist Ural" art exhibition. The board approved the sketch, and signed a contract with the artists. When the painting was almost complete, Mosin and Brusilovsky rolled up the canvas and painted an alternative version, portraying Lenin as a decisive person who was capable of doing anything in order to achieve his goals. When Serov found out that the artists had not shown Lenin as quiet and humble, like Serov himself and other artists of the time had, he attempted to do everything he could to ban the painting while it was still being painted. E. F. Belashova, chairperson of the Union of Artists of the USSR, helped to promote the painting, and used it in her campaign against Serov.

Belashova secretly took our painting away to Moskow and added it to a military exhibition called "On guard for peace", which was supervised by General Vostokov. Serov and other members of the Central Committee came to the opening of the exhibition and made an awful fuss when they saw our work. Then Vostokov said: “The painting will be on display here as long as the exhibition is open”. And he stationed a guard to stand beside it. Serov couldn’t do anything, and the next day he brought a painting by the Kholuev brothers, in which Lenin was portrayed in the canonical way, to the exhibition, and he hung it beside ours. Nonetheless our canvass saw the light of day and was displayed at several exhibitions.

— Misha Brusilovsky,

"1918" was exhibited at the largest exhibitions in Moscow, given a special commendation by the Ministry of Defence, reproduced in the journals "Tvorchestvo" (1965 and 1967), "Ogoniok" (1967), and "Art" (1967, 1969), in the books "Art born of October" (1967) and "The glory of those days will never cease" (1968), represented Soviet art at the international Biennale exhibition in Venice in 1966 and at an exhibition of young artists in Berlin (GDR) in 1967. The painting became an acknowledged part of official Leniniana and brought fame throughout the Soviet Union for Gennady Mosin and Misha Brusilovsky. The cinematographer Boris Shapiro made a film about the creators of the painting for the cinema journal "Soviet Ural".
The painting is currently in the Volgograd Museum of Fine Arts. The first version of the painting was completed by Brusilovsky at the end of the 1980s and given to the Yekaterinburg Museum of Fine Arts. The 1963 sketch of the painting is in the Perm State Art Gallery.

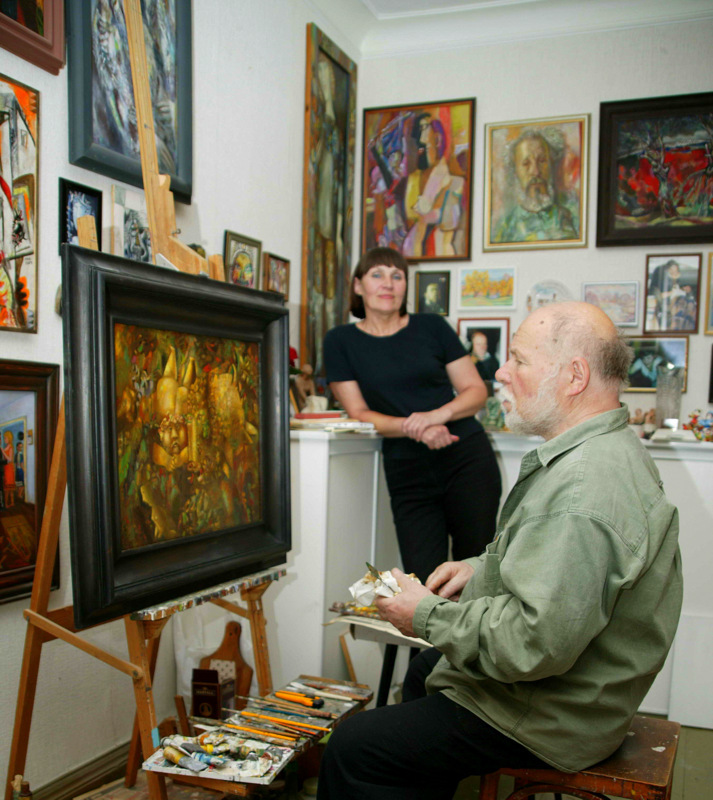
Misha Brusilovsky and Tatiana Nabrosova – Brusilovsky.

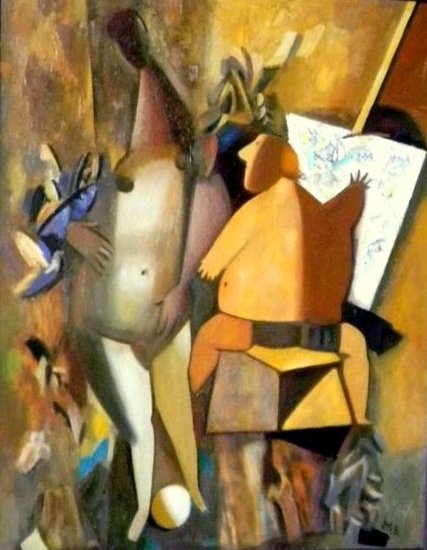
"Artist and model". Canvas, oil. 75х100. 2013.

His fame throughout the Soviet Union did not change Brusilovsky's standing among the bureaucrats from the Sverdlovsk branch of the Communist Party, who added the artist's name to the "black" list of formalists, and his relationship with the publishing house ended with his being officially forbidden from working.

"1918" was scandalous at first, and then hugely successful. Only one step separated the artist from unconditional official acknowledgement, but he chose a different path. And logically the chosen path away from success and acknowledgement led to the firmly-attached label of "formalist", which meant ideological inferiority. As a consequence, his works were removed from exhibitions, and the campaign against him became systematic.

— Vitaly Volovich, .

==== Independent work ====
Having lost his job at the publishing house and thus becoming free from the demands of the bu siness cycle, Brusilovsky worked a lot in his studio, which became a place of pilgrimage for artists.
In his work he turned to the theme of war ("The General" and "Garcia Lorca"), to mythological themes ("Leda", "Leda and the Swan", "Venus in the Grotto" and "The Rape of Europa"''), painted paintings based on folk takes ("The golden cockerel", "Little red riding-hood and the grey wolf"), and also paintings such as "Football", "Lena's dance", "Masks (City)", "Once in Sverdlovsk", "Yu. A. Gagarin" and many others".

In 1968 Brusilovsky became a member of the Union of Artists of the USSR.

In 1969, working in collaboration with Gennady Mosin, he painted "Civil War Red commanders in the Urals", which depicted Blyukher, Frunze, Chapaev and other Red commanders in the Civil War in the Urals. The painting was displayed at the third regional "Socialist Ural" art exhibition in Chelyabinsk and caused a lot of debates because the style of the painting was very different from Socialist Realism.

In 1972 Brusilovsky finished work on the painting "The Arkady Raikin Theatre", which was judged anti-Soviet. Because she acquired the painting for the Sverdlovsk Art Workers' House, the artistic director of the house Tatiana Nabrosova, Misha Brusilovsky's future wife, was called in to the KGB for questioning.

In 1976 Brusilovsky jointed the artists' group of the Ural Engineering Plant factory (Uralmash) consisting of 28 painters, graphic artists and sculptors.

In 1977 he painted the commissioned work "Group portrait of Uralmash team of smiths (B. Shulenov, K. Le, A. Kordukov: foreman, A. Moskvin, V. Venchinov, I. Bersenev, V. Erer)", which was included in the retrospective publication Artists and Uralmash" in 1983.

In 1984 he painted "Golubskovsky sovkhoz" ("Pig-breeding farm in the Golubskovsky sovkhoz"), which caused another scandal.

In this way the museum acquired Mikhail Brusilovsky's wonderful canvas "Pig-breeding farm in the Golubskovsky sovkhoz", where the little artist looks shyly up at shapely milkmaids. The painting caused a huge scandal in its time: communists from the Union of Artists reproached the artist for using a traditional composition, instead of an infant putting a pig into the arms of its Madonna.

— Kasya Popova,

In this way the museum acquired Mikhail Brusilovsky's wonderful canvas "Pig-breeding farm in the Golubskovsky sovkhoz", where the little artist looks shyly up at shapely milkmaids. The painting caused a huge scandal in its time: communists from the Union of Artists reproached the artist for using a traditional composition, instead of an infant putting a pig into the arms of its Madonna.

Boris Yeltsin, who held the role of first secretary of the Sverdlovsk branch of the Communist Party at the time, publicly declared that the painting was harmful to Soviet art.

==== Paris: Basmadjan Gallery ====
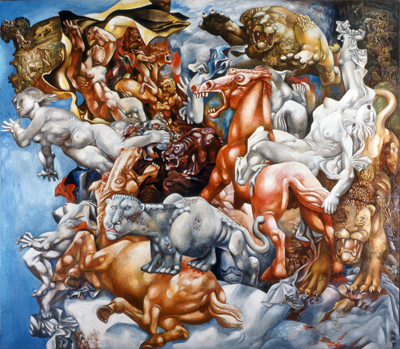
Aggression. Canvas, oil. 129,5х150. 1975.

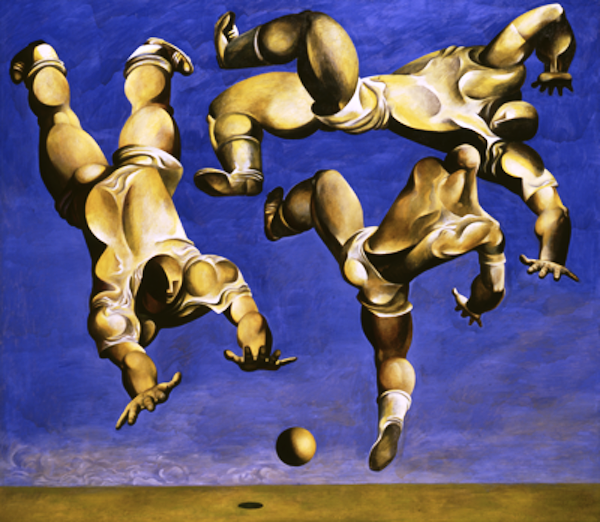
"Football". Canvas, oil. 1965.

When Perestroika began in the Soviet Union, democratic reforms began, and the party organs stopped interfering in the creative process of artists, writers and other arts professionals. The attitude towards Misha Brusilovsky's work also changed, and in 1986 "the ban on Brusilovsky" was lifted.
In 1989, Brusilovsky received an invitation from the French collector and gallery owner Garik (Garig) Basmadjan to have an exhibition in France.
In April 1989 Brusilovsky arrived in Paris. The exhibition was scheduled for November, but before that a lot of work had to be done to prepare the canvasses, which had arrived in France rolled up, and there were also a host of promotional activities. The painting "Aggression" (1975), which Basmadjan considered to be the most expressive and memorable, was chosen to advertise the exhibition. A reproduction of the painting was put on the cover of the exhibition catalogue, and also on advertising posters.

During the preparations for the exhibition in France, one day Basmadjan began to doubt whether Parisians, whose taste had been developed on intimate, tranquil paintings and confirmed by fashion trends and by prices at auction, would be able to appreciate properly the distinctive mastery of this artist from Russia whom they did not know. His doubts were dispelled when he found out that most of the posters advertising the exhibition, which had been put up in public places, had disappeared. He saw this as a sign of how successful the forthcoming exhibition would be, and because there was still enough time before the exhibition was due to open, he got another batch of posters printed and put them up again.

— Aleksandr Ryumin,

The retrospective exhibition in G. Basmadjan's gallery, in which fifty of Brusilovsky's pieces were displayed, took place from 18 November 1989 to 18 January 1990. The exhibition was a great success, and the French press mentioned Brusilovsky's name together with the names of artists from Russia such as Ilya Kabakov, Eric Bulatov and Vladimir Yankilevsky.
Garik Basmadjan was not present at the opening of the exhibition, because on 24 July 1989 he visited the USSR on the invitation of the Ministry of Culture, and on 29 July 1989 he disappeared without trace in Moscow. His disappearance is considered one of the most mysterious crimes of perestroika-era Russia.
Because of Garik Basmadjan's disappearance, the gallery stopped working with Misha Brusilovsky, and he returned to Russia having left a large number of his pieces in Paris.

==== The 1990s ====
In 1990, after he came back from France, Brusilovsky was awarded the "G. S. Mosin prize", for his contribution to the development of art in the Ural region.

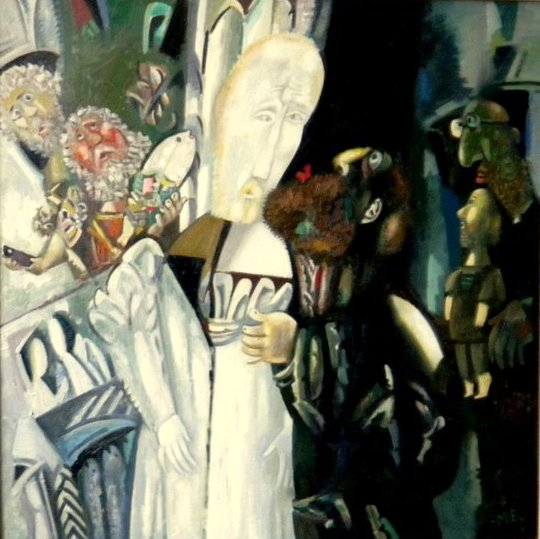
"Judas Kiss". Canvas, oil. 100х100. 1999.

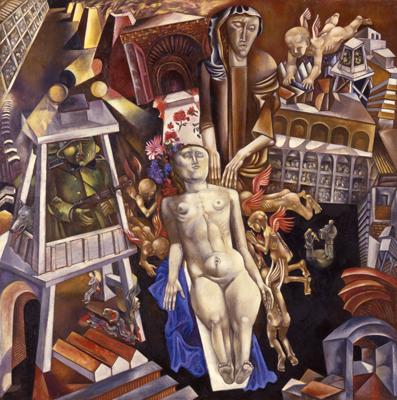
"Pieta. To the victims of war". Canvas, oil. 145х150. 1978.

In that same year 1990, together with Anatoly Kalashnikov, Brusilovsky got a private commission to paint eleven canvasses, sized 1.5 х 2 m, in the style of interior painting. When the project was complete, the client unexpectedly went abroad. He refused to collect the canvasses, and gave the artists permission to do what they wanted with the paintings. Misha Brusilovsky kept the paintings in his studio for many years, and only in 2013 were they exhibited to the general public.

In 1992 Brusilovsky visited the United States. He lived in the cities of Columbus and New York. In New York he visited his old friends from the Urals, the poet Bella Abramovna Dijur and her son Ernest Neizvestny. He also met the painter Anatoly Kalashnikov, who had come to New York from Sverdlovsk. But Brusilovsky devoted most of his time there to his work, and in the course of one year he managed to complete approximately one hundred paintings.

Something happened to me in America. I worked a lot, and most importantly, I had the impression that everything that I was doing was good. I would get up at six and go to bed at three in the morning. I did more than I had managed to do in the twenty years I lived Sverdlovsk-Ekaterinburg.

— Misha Brusilovsky,

After living in the United States for one year, Misha Brusilovsky decided to come back Sverdlovsk.

His trips to France and to the United States influenced features of Brusilovsky's style of painting and use of colour, and once again he began to revisit his favourite themes.

"The Rape of Europa", "Leda and the Swan, "Little red riding-hood", "Tomcats", "Woman on Horse", "Hunting Lions", and the biblical themes, especially "Peter and the Rooster", and even the renowned tragic composition "Pieta. To the victims of war" are understood in a new interpretation (but in no way a repetition) in the harmony of contrasts, and not as a confrontation between them using various styles.

— Aleksandr Ryumin,

In 1993 a personal exhibition of Misha Brusilovsky's work was held in the offices of the journal "Our Heritage", in Moscow, in which works which used a new style of painting were exhibited. In the period between 1993 and 1997, Brusilovsky also created a series of miniature works for the "Autograph" Gallery, which he created according to the principles of abstract art. These included works such as "Abstraction", "Composition", "Opus 2", "Opus 3", "Subjects", "Six subjects", "House", "Window", "Port", "Landscape", "Landscape at night", "Peace", "Remembering", "Leave-taking" and "Golgotha".

In 1995, 1997 and 1999 he visited Israel.

In 1999, an exhibition of Brusilovsky's painting called "Biblical themes" was held in the Sverdlovsk state philharmonic. Paintings from Yevgeny Roizman collection were displayed at the exhibition.

The exhibit included paintings which had been completed in recent years. Ten years after the retrospective exhibition in 1989 in the Ekaterinburg Municipal Museum of Fine Arts, Brusilovsky came before the public for the first time with compositions which used a new style of painting, whose expressive potential was most clearly illustrated by the large-scale canvas "Expulsion from Paradise".

— Aleksandr Ryumin,

=== Recognition ===
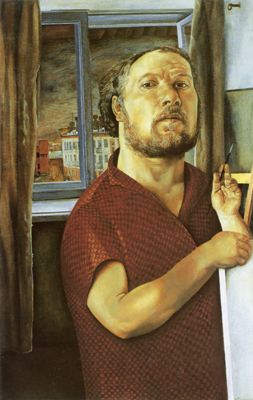
"Self-portrait". Canvas, oil. 1970.

In 2001 a personal exhibition of Misha Brusilovsky's paintings was held in the gallery "Manole" (Ein Hod, Israel) and there was a travelling exhibition "Russian art. 300 years" (Peking, Shanghai, Hong Kong, China) and a personal exhibition in the Ekaterinburg Museum of Fine Arts.

In 2002 the "Ural Gold Foundation" and the journal "Our Heritage" published the book "Misha Brusilovsky. World of the Artist" by Aleksandr Ryumin. The book is dedicated to the work of Misha Brusilovsky. ISBN 5-89295-009-3 In that same year 2002 Brusilovsky was awarded the Sverdlovsk Region Governor's prize "For outstanding achievements in literature and art".

In 2003 the gallery "Gold Scorpion", in its series of permanent exhibits "Noah's Ark", put on a joint exhibition of the works of Misha Brusilovsky and the sculptor Andrei Antonov.

In 2004, Brusilovsky took part in the exhibit "Carrying the Cross", organised by the Ekaterinburg Museum of Fine Arts.

In 2009 Brusilovsky took part in an exhibition of contemporary American and Russian art "Contact: Wind and Fire", organised with the support of the Department of Print and Culture of the General Consulate of the US in Ekaterinburg, the non-governmental foundation "Ekaterinburg creative union of cultural workers" and the "Ekaterinburg gallery of contemporary art". Works by famous American and Ural artists were exhibited at the event.

On 28 April 2009, the premiere of Svetlana Abakumova's documentary film "Sunday in the studio" was screened (Studio FSS, art-movement Old Man Bukashin, Studio Telesistema). The film is dedicated to Misha Brusilovsky's life and work.

In 2010, the art gallery "Art-Slovar" opened the permanent exhibit "Luminaries of Ural art", which included works by Brusilovsky such as "Samson and Delilah", "Leda and the Swan", "Rape of the Sabine Women" and "Auschwitz".

On 9 June 2011, the premiere of Boris Shapiro's documentary film "Misha and his friends", filmed in the "Bo-Sha-film" studio, was held in the Ekaterinburg House of Cinema. The film tells the story of Misha Brusilovsky's life and work.

On 16 September 2011, the Ekaterinburg Museum of Fine Arts opened a retrospective exhibition on the occasion of Brusilovsky's 80th birthday.

On 22 November 2011 Brusilovsky was awarded the title of Honoured artist of the Russian Federation by order of the President of the Russian Federation.

On 28 November 2013 Brusilovsky was made a Distinguished member of the Russian academy of arts.

Brusilovsky's works are located in the Ekaterinburg Museum of Fine Arts, the Perm State Art Gallery, the Ekaterinburg Gallery of Contemporary Art, the Chelyabinsk Region Gallery, the Orenburg Region Museum of Fine Arts, the Irbit State Museum of Fine Arts, and also in private collections in Russia, Austria, England, Germany, Israel, US, France and Switzerland.

The paintings which Brusilovsky left in France and in the US are periodically sold at some of the largest auctions in the world. In 2006, at a Sotheby's auction in London, the painting "Football", was sold for 108000 Pounds.

According to the publication "The Art Newspaper Russia", Misha Brusilovsky occupies 38th place was in the list of the 50 most expensive living Russian artists.

== Death ==
Misha Brusilovsky died on 3 November 2016 in Yekaterinburg, Russia

== Selected works ==
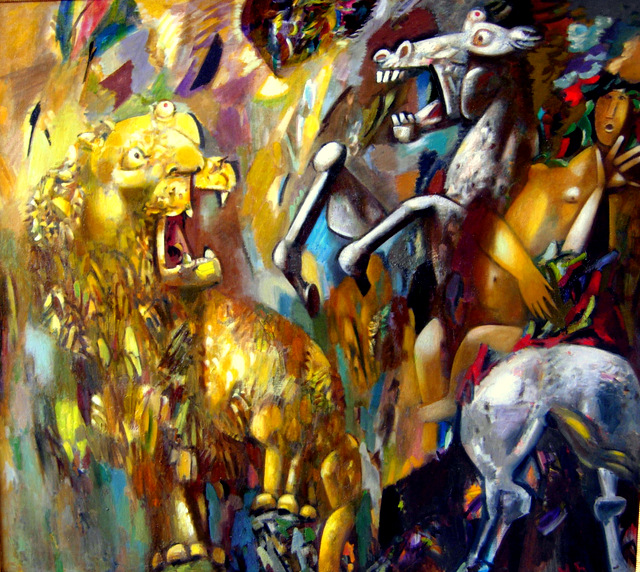
"Lion Hunt" (From series). Canvas, oil. 125х140. 1998.

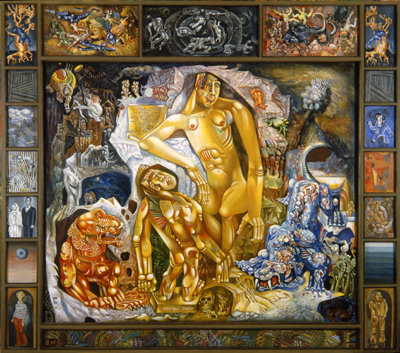
"Homo sapiens". Canvas, oil. 151х172. 1973.

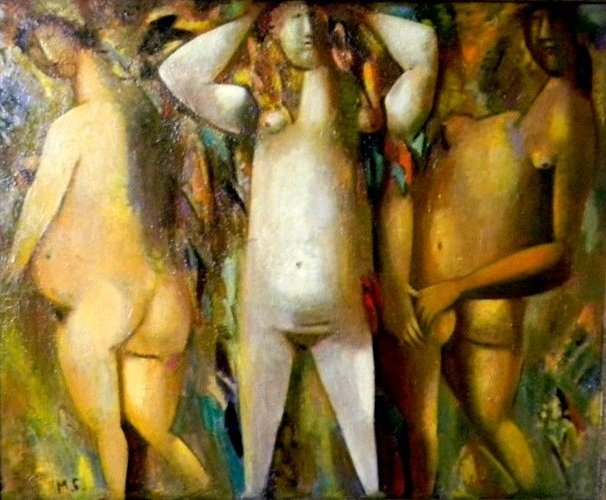
"Three graces". Canvas, oil. 85х100. 2013.

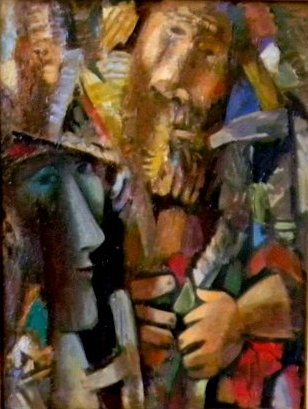
"Two portraits". Cardboard, oil. 65х50. 2000.

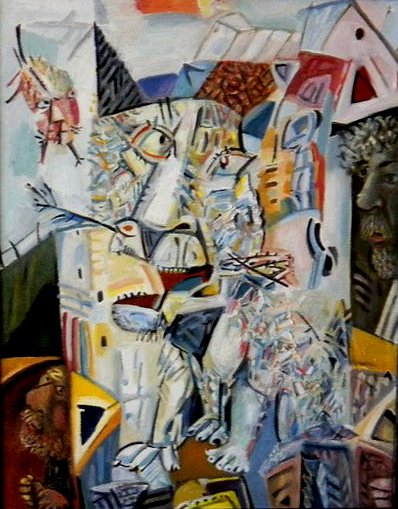
"Memory of the cat Timophey". Canvas, oil. 70х56. 2013.

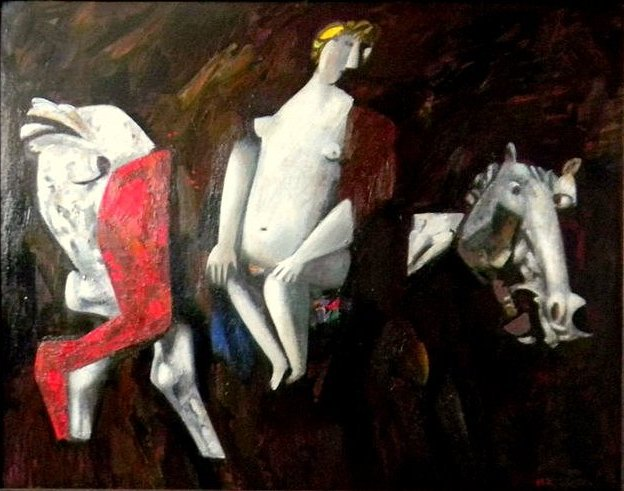
"Equestrienne". Сardboard, oil. 75х100. 2000.

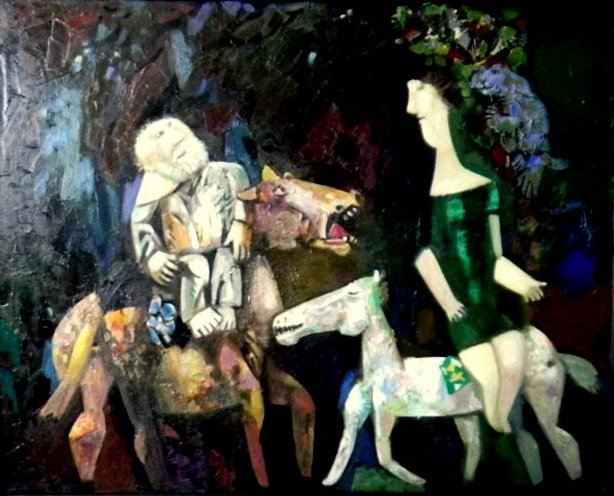
"Meeting". Canvas, oil, 85х100. 1994.

== Titles and awards ==
- 1990 — Laureate of the "G. S. Mosin prize"
- 2002 — Laureate of the Sverdlovsk region Governor's prize "For outstanding achievements in literature and art".
- 2011 — Honoured artist of the Russian Federation
- 2013 — Distinguished member of Russian Academy of Artists

== Sculptural composition "City dwellers. Conversation" ==
In August 2008 the sculptural composition "City dwellers. Conversation" was installed on a square in Ekaterinburg at the junction of Lenin Prospect and Michurin Street. The work of sculptor Andrei Antonov (1944–2011), the composition depicts three Ural artists: Misha Brusilovsky, Vitaly Volovich and Herman Metelev.

== Literature ==
• In 2002, the "Ural Gold Foundation" (Yekaterinburg) and the journal "Our heritage" (Moscow), published the book "Misha Brusilovsky. World of the artist", which tells the story of the life and work of Misha Brusilovsky. Author: Aleksandr Ryumin. ISBN 5-89295-009-3

== Sources ==
- Ekaterinburg artists: Misha Brusilovsky
- Article by Rina Mikhailova "Painting as confession for the soul..."
- Article by Kasia Popova "Everyone can give one grain…". "Kommersant" newspaper
- Biography of Misha Brusilovsky on the site Artists’ "Union of Russia"
- Interview with Misha Brusilovsky in "Komsomol’skaya Pravda"
- E. P. Alekseev. G Mosin and M. Brusilovsky’s painting "1918" : An analysis of the artistic system.
- "Misha Brusilovsky. World of the artist", 2002. Author: Aleksandr Ryumin. "Ural Gold Foundation" and the journal "Our Heritage". ISBN 5-89295-009-3
