= Konya Manuscript =

Manuscript of Ibn Arabi's Al-Futuhat al-Makkiyya

Konya Manuscript مخطوط قونية
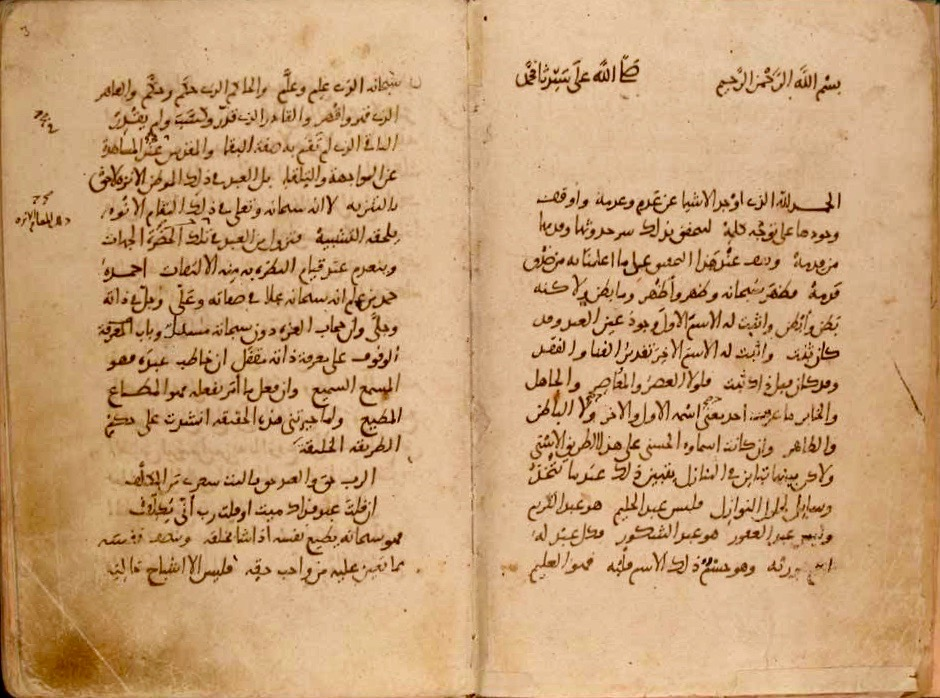
- Also known as: MS Evkaf Muzesi 1845+
- Language: Arabic
- Scribe(s): Ibn Arabi, with the exception of volume 9
- Author: Ibn Arabi

The Konya Manuscript (Arabic: مخطوط قونية), MS Evkaf Muzesi 1845+ or Evkaf Muzesi 1845–1881 at, Turkish and Islamic Arts Museum is an autograph manuscript of Ibn Arabi's magnum opus Al-Futuhat al-Makkiyya (The Meccan Revelations), completed in 37 volumes in 1238.

== History ==
Ibn Arabi wrote al-Futuhat al-Makkiyya twice—a first draft completed in 1231 and a revision—the Konya manuscript— completed in 1238. The manuscript was once part of the waqf of Sadr al-Din al-Qunawi, now kept at the Turkish and Islamic Arts Museum in Istanbul (MS Evkaf Muzesi) 1845–1881).

=== Standard Cairo edition ===
The Amiri Press in Bulaq published three editions of al-Futuhat al-Makkiyya, in 1853–1857, in 1876, and in 1911. While the first two editions were composite texts from Ibn Arab's first draft and revision, the third edition reproduced the text of the Konya Manuscript, thanks to the investigative efforts of Emir ʿAbd al-Qādir al-Jazāʾirī. This third edition became the standard Cairo edition.

== Description ==
The manuscript is a holograph; it was written in the hand of Ibn Arabi, with the exception of volume 9.

The work contains 28 images hand-drawn by Ibn Arabi: geometric figures representing and illustrating the physical and the metaphysical. Reproductions of these images in published versions of the text were made carelessly and are not reliable.
