= Claude Addas =

French-Polish scholar of Islam

- Occupation: Historian
- Father: Michel Chodkiewicz

Academic work
- Discipline: History
- Sub-discipline: Oriental studies
- Main interests: Ibn Arabi
- Notable works: Quest for the Red Sulphur
- Website: Claude Addas publications on Academia.edu

Claude Addas is a French-Polish scholar of Islam who has made major contributions to the field of Ibn Arabi studies.

== Biography ==
Addas is the daughter of the Islamic scholar Michel Chodkiewicz. As a child, Addas refused her father's wish to learn Latin, instead agreeing to study Arabic as a compromise. Addas earned a degree in Arabic and Persian.

She is the author of the 1989 book Ibn ʻArabī, ou, La quête du soufre rouge, a biography of Ibn Arabi, which was translated into English by Peter Kingsley as Quest for the Red Sulphur: The Life of Ibn 'Arabi and published in 1993. William Chittick described Quest for the Red Sulphur as "the best and most thoroughly documented account" of Ibn Arabi's life. Gregory Lipton described her as "Ibn Arabi's preeminent Western biographer".

Addas is also the author of Ibn Arabî et le voyage sans retour, which was translated into English as Ibn 'Arabi: The Voyage of No Return.

== Works ==
- Ibn ʻArabī, ou, La quête du soufre rouge. Gallimard, 1989, ISBN 2-07-071504-3
- Ibn Arabî et le voyage sans retour, Le Seuil 1996, ISBN 978-2-02-025126-6
- La Maison muhammadienne: Aperçus de la dévotion au Prophète en mystique musulmane, Gallimard, 2015, ISBN 2-07-014763-0

=== Works translated to English ===
- Quest for the Red Sulphur: The Life of Ibn 'Arabi. Islamic Texts Society, 1993, ISBN 0-946621-45-4
- Ibn 'Arabi: The Voyage of No Return. Islamic Texts Society, 2000, ISBN 0-946621-74-8
