= Autograph (gallery) =

The "Autograph" Gallery
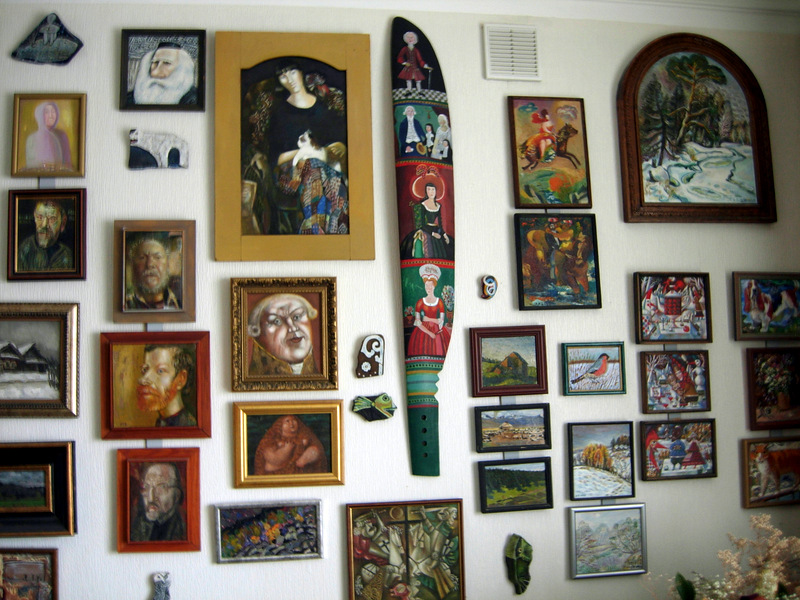
- Established: 1993
- Location: Yekaterinburg, Russian Federation
- Type: Contemporary art
- Director: Tatiana Nabrosova – Brusilovsky

"Autograph" Gallery is an informal gallery of contemporary art composed of a collection of miniature paintings, drawings and sculptures. It was founded by gallery owner Tatiana Nabrosova-Brusilovskaya in December 1993.

== How the gallery was founded ==
The idea to found the "Autograph" Gallery belongs to Tatiana Nabrosova-Brusilovskaya and to the artist German Metelev. It was decided to set up the gallery in the home of Tatiana Nabrosova-Brusilovskaya and the artist Misha Brusilovsky, where artists as well as other creative professionals frequently gather, thanks to which the Brusilovskys' home has the creative atmosphere and intensity which is necessary for such a gallery.
It was decided to limit the size of the works to thirty centimetres.
This size meant that it was possible to gather a large quantity of works by artists of various styles in the one house, and it also meant that transporting and housing the exhibits was easier.

On the one hand the required size for the paintings (up to 30 cm) limits the possibilities open to the artist, but on the other hand it concentrates creativity and brings in a playful and relaxed element which often leads to interesting results. The small size gives us the unique possibility to collect a large quantity of works by all sorts of artists who use all sorts of styles and to display them all together. When such varied creative personalities meet in a small exhibition space, literally on one wall, there is a special intensity which creates an overall large piece of art.

— Tatiana Nabrosova – Brusilovsky,

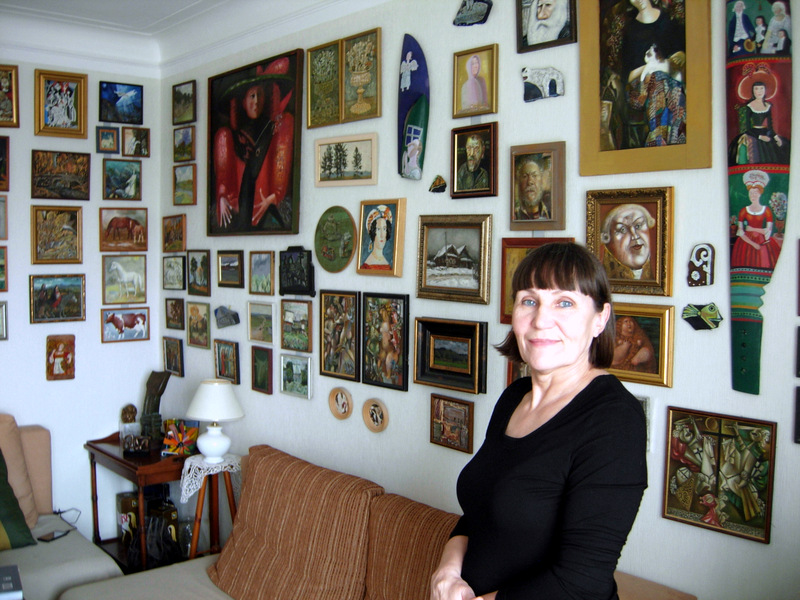
Tatiana Nabrosova – Brusilovsky, 2014.

Initially it was planned to name the gallery "Sackvoyage", because the miniature size of the exhibits, which could be carried in a travelling bag, but later it was decided to give it the name "Autograph".

Why "Autograph"? The dictionary gives the following definitions of this word: “1. A handwritten signature, usually distinctive. 2. A text handwritten by the author”. And if I limit the size, give the artist a pre-prepared canvas on a frame, and ask them to paint something as a memento, then it is completely acceptable to call that an artistic autograph too.

— Tatiana Nabrosova – Brusilovsky,

One December evening in 1993 the artist German Metelev came to the Brusilovskys' home and brought with him three miniature paintings sized 13 х 27 centimetres and about a dozen canvases on frames of the same size. Misha Brusilovsky took one of the canvases and began painting a small picture. The next person to offer her work was the artist Svetlana Tarasova. When some Yekaterinburg artists found out that Tatiana Nabrosova-Brusilovskaya was collecting miniature paintings for a gallery they began offering her their work too. In this way, by 2000 the "Autograph" Gallery had a collection of 450 paintings and more than 200 sheets of drawings, etchings, lithographs and woodcutings, most of which were specially created by the artists for this project.

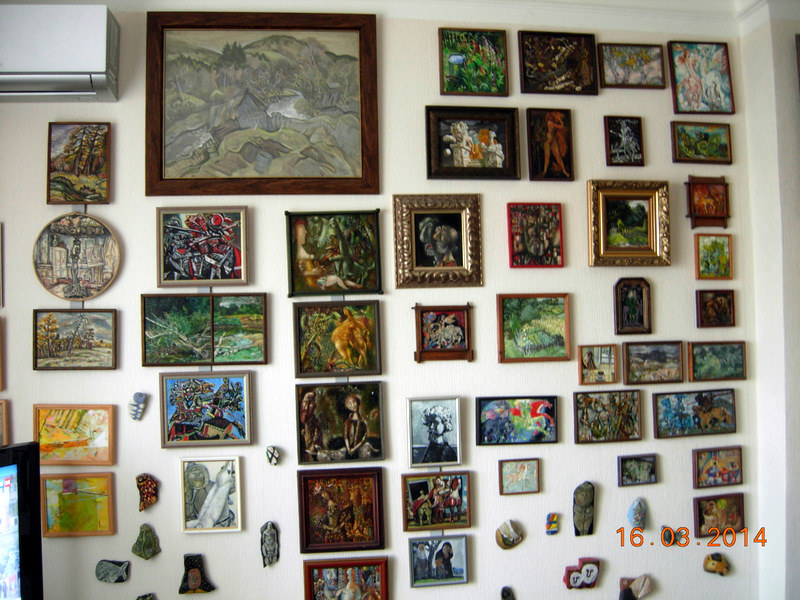
The "Autograph" Gallery

The Autograph" Gallery's collection is made up of works created by artists of several generations and various artistic styles. Among them are both well-known and emerging artists from Yekaterinburg, Chelyabinsk, Ufa, Moscow, Saint Petersburg, and also painters and graphic artists from Germany, Israel, China and Czech Republic. They are all friends of the artistic couple Misha Brusilovsky and Tatiana Nabrosova-Brusilovskaya. In 2004, thanks to the charitable organisation for Russian traditions "Our Family", with the participation of the journal "Our Heritage" and the Canadian Foundation for Gender equality, an exhibition from the "Autograph" Gallery was held as part of the project "Support for women's participation in the visual arts". At this 170 small-format pieces by more than 100 artists from the Ural-Siberia region and also from Moscow and Saint Petersburg were displayed. On 22 February 2008 in The Irbit State Museum of Fine Art, the exhibition "Herman Metelev. Paintings and drawings, from the museum's collection and from private collections" opened to mark the artist's 70th birthday. Twenty eight small-format paintings by Herman Metelev were displayed from the "Autograph" Gallery. Gatherings of artists are regularly held in the "Autograph" Gallery, as are competitions for the best painting of the year.

== Artists ==
Misha Brusilovsky, Vitaly Volovich, Igor Pchelnikov and others.

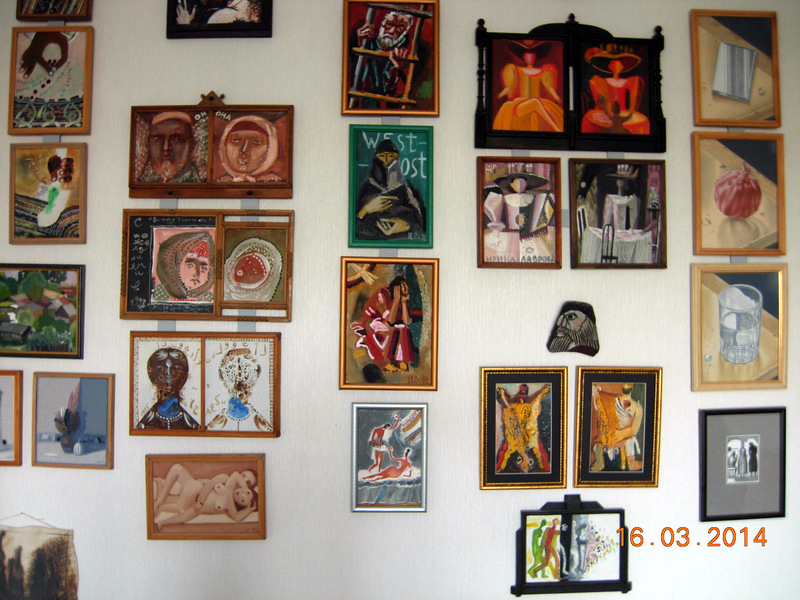
The "Autograph" Gallery

== Exhibitions ==
- 2004 – In the offices of the journal "Our Heritage" with the support of the Canadian foundation for gender equality as part of the project "Support for women's participation in the visual art".
- 2008 – "Irbit State Museum of Fine Art". The exhibition "German Metelev. Paintings and drawings, from the museum's collection and from private collections" on the occasion of the artist's 70th birthday.
- 2017 – "Ekaterinburg Museum of Fine Art".

== Booklets and exhibition catalogues ==
The "Autograph" Gallery: Paintings and drawings from T. F. Nabrosova-Brusilovskaya's collection / Catalogue compiled by T. F. Nabrosova-Brusilovskaya. Introductory articles by V. M. Volovich and H. S. Metelev. Published by Ye. V. Roizman. Yekaterinburg: Ural University Press, 2000. 166 p., ill. (Translated into English.)

== Sources ==
- “Our Heritage” journal.
- “Our Heritage” journal – Projects.
- Irina Barkhatova. Article “The man who could do everything”. Irbit city website.
- Article ‘Kalashnikov and Brusilovsky in the “Autograph” Gallery. Tass-Ural.
- Yulia Kruteeva. Article “A large painting is prose; a small one is poetry”. Journal of the gallery “ArtBird”.
- The "Autograph" Gallery: Paintings and drawings from T. F. Nabrosova-Brusilovskaya's collection / Catalogue compiled by T. F. Nabrosova-Brusilovskaya. Introductory articles by V. M. Volovich and G. S. Metelev. Published by Ye. V. Roizman. Yekaterinburg: Ural University Press, 2000. 166 p., ill. (Translated into English.)
