= Autograph (Assyriology) =

Hand-copy of a cuneiform clay-tablet

An autograph in Assyriology is the hand-copy of a cuneiform clay-tablet. Producing an autograph is often the first step of a tablet's archaeological interpretation and the autograph is frequently the authoritative form that is published as source material. Autographing the text is followed by transliteration, transcription and translation.
