= Bach's choir and orchestra =

Much has been written about Bach's ensembles (both in size and constituents—both vocal and instrumental) that he used.

In Bach's time figural music referred to more advanced vocal church music, usually accompanied by instrumental forces, such as his motets, church cantatas and passions. The vocal and instrumental forces used by Bach for the performance of such music are to a certain extent documented for all the periods of his life. Information about his secular orchestral and choral music is more limited: it mostly involves his period in Köthen, and his involvement with Leipzig's student orchestra, the Collegium Musicum performing at Café Zimmermann.

== Leipzig ==
=== Figural music ===
In 1730, Bach wrote a memo (Entwurff) to the Leipzig town council regarding musical staffing of the Leipzig churches for which he was responsible.

==== Vocal forces ====
In regards to vocal forces, Bach wrote:

Zu einer wohlbestellten Kirchen Music gehören Vocalisten und Instrumentalisten. Die Vocalisten werden hiesiges Ohrts von denen Thomas Schülern formiret, und zwar von vier Sorten, als Discantisten, Altisten, Tenoristen, und Baßisten. So nun die Chöre derer Kirchen Stücken recht, wie es sich gebühret, bestellt werden sollen, müßen die Vocalisten wiederum in 2erley Sorten eingetheilet werden, als: Concertisten udn Ripienisten. Derer Concertisten sind ordinaire 4; auch wohl 5, 6, 7 biß 8; so mann nemlich per Choros musiciren will. Derer Ripienisten müßen wenigstens auch achte seyn, nemlich zu jeder Stimme zwey...Die Anzahl derer Alumnorum Thomanæ Scholæ ist 55. Diese 55 werden eingetheilet in 4 Chöre, nach denen 4 Kirchen, worinne sie theils musiciren, theils motetten und theils Chorale singen müßen. In denen 3 Kirchen, als zu S. Thomæ, S. Nicolai und der Neüen Kirche müßen die Schüler alle musicalisch seyn. In die Peters-Kirche kömmt der Ausschuß, nemlich die, so keine music verstehen, sondern nur nothdörfftig einen Choral singen können. Zu iedweden musicalischen Chor gehören wenigstens 3 Sopranisten, 3 Altisten, 3 Tenoristen, und eben so viele Baßisten, damit, so etwa einer unpaß wird (wie denn sehr offte geschieht, und besonders bey itziger Jahres Zeit, da die recepte, so von dem Schul Medico in die Apothecke verschrieben werden, es ausweisen müßen) wenigstens eine 2 Chörigte Motette gesungen werden kan. (NB. Wiewohln es noch beßer, wenn der Coetus so beschaffen wäre, dass mann zu ieder Stimme 4 subjecta nehmen, und also ieden Chor mit 16. Persohnen bestellen könte.)

which translates to:

A well-appointed Church Music requires Vocalists and Instrumentalists. The Vocalists are in this place [Leipzig] made up of the pupils of the Thomas-Schule (Thomasschule zu Leipzig), being of four kinds, namely, Sopranos (Discanten), Altos, Tenors, and Basses. In order that the Choruses of Church Pieces may be performed as is fitting, the Vocalists must in turn be divided into two sorts, namely, Concertists and Ripienists. The Concertists are ordinarily 4 in number; sometimes also 5, 6, 7, even 8; that is, if one wishes to perform music for two choirs [per choros]. The Ripienists, too, must be at least 8, namely, two for each part .... The Number of the Alumni Thomanae Scholae (resident students of the Thomas-Schule) is 55. These 55 are divided into 4 Choirs, for the 4 Churches in which they must perform partly concerted music, partly motets, and partly chorales. In the 3 Churches, St. Thomas, St. Nicholas, and the New Church (St. Matthew), the pupils all must be musical. St. Peter receives the remainder, namely those who do not understand music and can only just barely sing a chorale. Every musical Choir should contain at least 3 Sopranos, 3 Altos, 3 Tenors, and as many basses, so that even if one happens to fall ill (as very often happens, particularly at this time of year, as the prescriptions written by the school Physician for the Apothecary must show) at least a double-chorus motet may be sung. (Note: Though it would be still better if the classes were such that one could have 4 singers on each part and thus could perform every chorus with 16 persons). This makes in all 36 persons who must understand musicam.

He also lists in a note dating from about the same year (1730) the minimum requirements for the churches mentioned in the Entwurff:

In the Nicolai-Kirche the 1st choir requires:	At the Thomas-Kirche the 2nd choir:	At the New Church the 3rd choir:	The 4th choir (And this last choir must also take care of the Peters-Kirche).
3 Sopranos	3 Sopranos	3 Sopranos	2 Sopranos
3 Altos	3 Altos	3 Altos	2 Altos
3 Tenors	3 Tenors	3 Tenors	2 Tenors
3 Basses	3 Basses	3 Basses	2 Basses

==== Instrumental forces ====
Likewise, Bach wrote of the instrumental forces required:

Die Instrumentalisten werden auch in verschiedene Arthen eingetheilet als: Violinisten, Hautboisten, Fleutenisten, Trompetter und Paucker. NB. Zu denen Violisten / gehören auch die die, so die Violen Violoncelli und Violons spielen...Machet demnach der numerus, so Musicam verstehen müßen, 36 Personen aus. Die Instrumental Music bestehet aus folgenden Stimmen; als:

- 2 auch wohl 3 zur Violino 1.
- 2 biß 3 zur Violino 2.
- 2 zur Viola 1.
- 2 zur Viola 2.
- 2 zum Violoncello.
- 1 zum Violon.
- 2 auch wohl nach Beschaffenheit 3 zu denen Hautbois.
- 1 auch 2 zum Basson.
- 3 zu denen Trompeten.
- 1 zu denen Paucken.

summa. 18. Persohnen wenigstens zur Instrumental-Music. NB. füget sichs, dass das KirchenStück auch mit Flöten, (sie seynd nun à bec oder Traversieri), componiret ist (wie denn sehr offt zur Abwechselung geschiehet) sind wenigstens auch 2 Persohnen darzu nötig. Thun zusammen 20 Instrumentisten. Der Numerus derer zur Kirchen Music bestellten Persohnen bestehet aus 8 Persohnen, als 4. StadPfeifern, 3 KunstGeigern und einem Gesellen. Von deren qualitäten und musicalischen Wißenschafften aber etwas nach der Warheit zu erwehnen, verbietet mir die Bescheidenheit. Jedoch ist zu consideriren, dass Sie theils emeriti, theils auch in keinem solchen / exercitio sind, wie es wohl seyn solte.

which translates to:

The instrumentalists are also divided into various kinds, namely, violinists (Violisten), oboists, flutists, trumpeters, and drummers. Note: The violinists include also [i.e., in addition to the players of the violin] those who play the violas, the violoncellos, and the violons) .... The instrumental music consists of the following parts, namely:

- 2 or even 3 for the Violino 1
- 2 or 3 for the Violino 2
- 2 for the Viola 1
- 2 for the Viola 2
- 2 for the Violoncello
- 1 for the Violone
- 2, or, if the piece requires, 3, for the Hautbois (oboe)
- 1, or even 2, for the Basson (bassoon)
- 3 for the Trumpets
- 1 for the Timpani)

-- Summa 18 persons at least, for the instrumental music

Note: If it happens that the Church piece is composed with Flutes also (whether they are à bec [ Recorders] or Traversieri [ Transverse flutes]), as very often happens for variety's sake, at least 2 more persons are needed. Making altogether 20 instrumentalists. The number of persons engaged for the Church music is 8, namely, 4 Town pipers (StadPfeifer), 3 professional fiddlers (KunstGeiger), and one apprentice. Modesty forbids me to speak at all truthfully of their qualities and musical knowledge. Nevertheless it must be remembered that they are partly emeriti and partly not at all in such exercise as they should be.

== After 1750 ==
=== 21st century ===
In the 21st century, several conductors have recorded all or most of Bach's cantatas using choirs with three or four singers per part. For instance, Philippe Herreweghe has performed and recorded "Bach ... as he practiced in Leipzig, with three suitable singers per voice group". Herreweghe sees voices suitable for Bach as "small" voices, voice types with certain characteristics: he names Peter Kooij and Dorothee Mields as examples of that voice type.

By contrast, a number of 21st-century Bach conductors have instead accepted Joshua Rifkin's arguments that most of Johann Sebastian Bach's choral music was performed with only one singer per voice part.

== Sources ==
- Malcolm Boyd. Bach. Oxford University Press, 2006. ISBN 9780195307719
