= Autograph letter (Holy See) =

Letter from the Pope referencing himself

In Vatican usage, an autograph letter is a letter signed by the Pope in which he refers to himself as "I", or using the majestic plural, "we", as opposed to the more usual letter from the pope signed by a subordinate referring to the Pope as "he" and saying, for example, "The Holy Father has directed me to reply to your letter".
