= Ibn Arabi =

Sufi scholar and Sunni philosopher (1165–1240)

Sheikh, Mujaddid Ibn ʿArabī
- ابن عربي
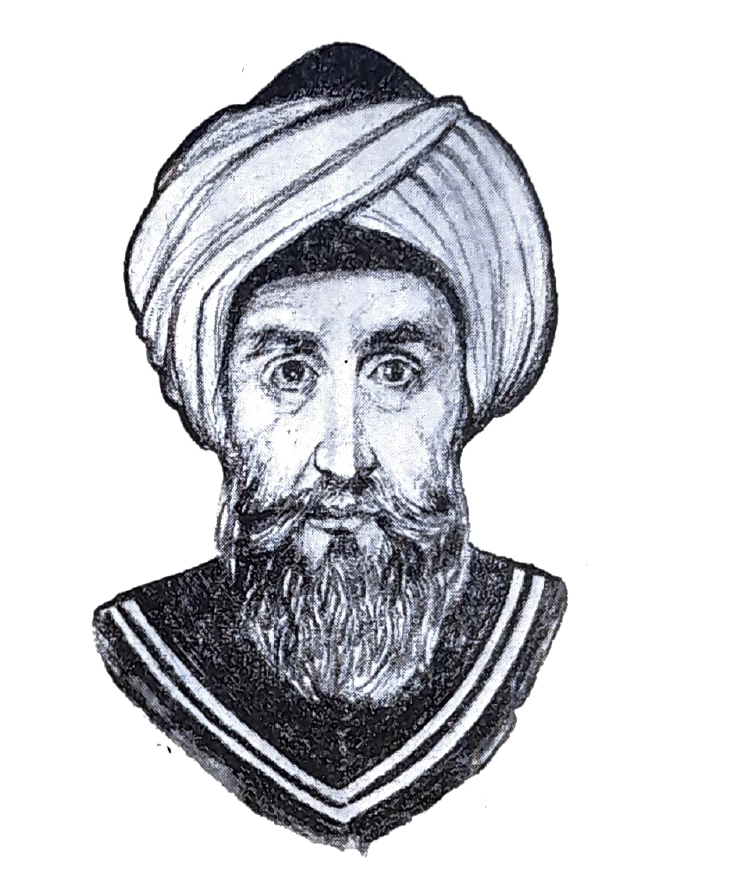
- A sketch representing Ibn Arabi from a book entitled Sayr mulhimah: min al-Sharq wa-al-Gharb by unknown author, 1961

Personal life
- Born: 28 July 1165 Murcia, Taifa of Murcia
- Died: 16 November 1240 (aged 75) Salihiyya, Damascus, Ayyubid Sultanate
- Resting place: Mount Qasioun, Damascus, Syria
- Children: Sa'ad al-Din, Imad al-Din; Sadr al-Din al-Qunawi (stepson)
- Parent: Ali ibn Muhammad ibn Arabi al-Hatimi al-Tai (father)
- Era: Medieval philosophy: 12th century philosophy; 13th century philosophy
- Region: Middle Eastern philosophy: Islamic philosophy
- Main interests: Sufism; Tafsir; Epistemology; Ontology; Poetry; Fiqh
- Notable work: Al-Futuhat al-Makkiyya
- Occupation: Mufassir, Muhaddtih, Theologian, Philosopher, Academic, Poet

Religious life
- Religion: Islam
- Denomination: Sunni
- Jurisprudence: Mujtahid often confused to be a Zahiri
- Creed: Founder of Akbarism

Muslim leader
- Teacher: Shaykh Abū ʿAbd Allāh al-Tamīmī (Junaydiyya), Shaykh ʿAbd al-ʿAzīz al-Mahdawī (Qadiriyya)
- Students: Sadr al-Din al-Qunawi
- Influenced: Virtually all of Sufism
- Arabic name
- Personal (Ism): Muḥammad محمد
- Epithet (Laqab): Muḥyī d-Dīn محيي الدين
- Toponymic (Nisba): al-Ḥātimī الحاتمي aṭ-Ṭāʾī الطائي

Ibn al-ʿArabī (Note: Arabic: ابن عربي, ALA-LC: Ibn ʻArabī; full name: أبو عبد الله محـمـد بن عربي الطائي الحاتمي, Abū ʻAbd Allāh Muḥammad ibn ʻArabī al-Ṭāʼī al-Ḥātimī) (August 1165 – November 1240) was a Muslim Arab scholar, mystic, poet, and philosopher from al-Andalus, who exercised notable influence within Sufi metaphysics and Islamic thought in general. There are 850 works attributed to Ibn al-ʿArabī, though only 700 of these are considered authentic, and only 400 are extant. His cosmological teachings became a dominant intellectual framework in many regions of the Muslim world.

His traditional title was Muḥyiddīn (Arabic: محيي الدين, lit. 'The Reviver of Religion'). After his death, practitioners of Sufism began referring to him by the honorific title Shaykh al-Akbar (Arabic: الشيخ الأكبر, lit. 'The Greatest Shaykh'), from which the term Akbarism is derived.

Ibn ʿArabī is considered a wali (saint) by some scholars and Muslim communities.

Ibn al-ʿArabī is known for being the first person to explicitly delineate the concept of waḥdat al-wujūd (the transcendent unity of being), a monist doctrine that claimed that all things in the universe are manifestations of a singular reality. Ibn al-ʿArabī equated this reality with the entity he called "the Absolute" (al-wujūd al-muṭlaq, "Absolute Being").

== Early life ==
Ibn 'Arabī was born in the Taifa of Murcia, in present-day southeastern Spain, on the 17th of Ramaḍān 560 AH (28 July 1165), although other sources suggest the 27th of Ramaḍān 560 AH (6 August 1165 AD) as an alternative birthdate. His first name was Muhammad. After the birth of his son, he was known as Abū ʿAbdullāh (the father of Abdullāh), as is common practice for Arabic names. In some of his works, ibn 'Arabī referred to himself with fuller versions of his name, Abū ʻAbd Allāh Muḥammad ibn ʻArabī al-Ṭāʼī al-Ḥātimī, where the last three names indicate his noble lineage from the tribes of Arabia. His relative Ḥātim aṭ-Ṭāʼiyy was well-known as a poet of pre-Islamic Arabia of the Qahtanite (South Arabian) tribe of Ṭayyi’.

=== Family ===
Ibn 'Arabī came from a mixed background. His father descended from Arab emigrants to al-Andalus in the early years of the Muslim conquest of the Iberian Peninsula. His mother was presumably of Berber descent. In his Futūḥāt al-Makkīyah, ibn 'Arabī writes of a deceased maternal uncle, a prince of Tlemcen who abandoned wealth for an ascetic life after encountering a Sufi mystic. His paternal ancestry came from Yemen and belongs to one of the oldest Arab groups in al-Andalus. They may have migrated during the second wave of the Muslim conquest of Iberia.

His father, ʿAli ibn Muḥammad, served in the Army of Ibn Mardanīsh, the ruler of the Taifa of Murcia. When Murcia fell to the Almohad Caliphate in 1172, Ibn Mardanīsh did not survive the defeat and was killed in battle, leading to his father pledging allegiance to the Almohad caliph Abū Ya'qūb Yūsuf I. At the time, ibn Arabi was only 7 years old, and his family relocated from Murcia to Seville to serve the new ruler.

Ibn Arabi had three wives. He married Maryam, a woman from an influential family, when he was still a young adult and lived in Andalusia. Maryam shared his aspiration to follow the Sufi path, as quoted by Austin in Sufis of Andalusia:

My saintly wife, Maryam bint Muhammad binti Abdun, said, 'I have seen in my sleep someone whom I have never seen in the flesh, but who appears to me in my moments of (spiritual) ecstasy. He asked me whether I was aspiring to the Way, to which I replied that I was, but that I did not know by what means to arrive at it. He then told me that I would come to it through five things: trust, certainty, patience, resolution, and veracity.' Thus, she offered her vision to me (for my consideration), and I told her that was indeed the method of the Folk (Sufis). I myself have never seen one with that degree of mystical experience.

During his long stay in Anatolia, according to Arabic and Persian sources, ibn Arabi married Majd al-Dīn's widow and assumed responsibility for the education of her young son, Sadr al-Din al-Qunawi. Ibn Arabi also mentioned his third wife in his writings, the mother of his son Imāduddin, to whom he bequeathed the first copy of Futūḥāt al-Makkīyah.

=== Teachers ===
Ibn Arabi studied under many scholars who were mentioned in the ijaza (permission to teach and transmit) written to al-Muzaffar Ghazi, the ruler of Damascus (Note: Ibn Arabi presented this ijaza, which enumerates in various manuscript versions from 270 to 290 works, to the Damascene ruler al-Malik al-Muzaffar Baha' al-Din (d. 635/1237) in 632/1234.) and son of Al-Adil I. Some of these most prominent scholars of the time were:

- Ibn 'Asakir (d. 571/1176), and his son al-Qasim b. 'Ali b. 'Asakir (d. 600/1203)
- Abu Tahir al-Silafi (d. 576/1180)
- Ibn Bashkuwal (d. 578/1183)
- 'Abd al-Haqq al-Ishbili (d. 581/1185) the student of Ibn Hazm. Ibn Arabi read all of Ibn Hazm's books while studying under him.
- Abu Zayd al-Suhayli (d. 581/1185)
- Ibn Zarqun (d. 586/1190)
- Ibn al-Jadd (d. 586/1190)
- Abu Madyan (d. 594/1197)
- Ibn Rushd (Averroes) (d. 595/1198)
- Ibn al-Jawzi (d. 597/1201)
- Ibn Abi Jamra (d. 599/1202)
- Abu Shuja' Zahir ibn Rustam al-Isfahani (d. 609/1212) Imam of the Holy Shrine in the Great Mosque of Mecca.
- Jamal al-Din b. al-Harastani (d. 614/1217)
- Ibn Malik (d. 672/1274)

=== Students ===
His most prominent students include:

- Badr al-Din al-Habashi (d. 618/1221)
- Ibn al-Farid (d. 632/1235) was considered by 'Abd al-Ghani al-Nabulsi among Ibn Arabi's students.
- Al-Muzaffar Baha' al-Din Ghazi (son of al-'Adil I the Ayyubid) (d. 613/1216 or 635/1237)
- Zakiy al-Din al-Birzali (d. 636/1239)
- Shams al-Din al-Khuwayyi (d. 637/1239)
- Ibn al-Dubaythi (d. 637/1239)
- Ibn al-Najjar (d. 643/1245)
- Diya' al-Din al-Maqdisi (d. 643/1245)
- Isma'il ibn Sawdakin (d. 646/1248)
- Sa'd al-Din al-Hamawi (d. 650/1252)
- Muhyi al-Din Yahya ibn al-Zaki (d. 668/1270) who patronized Ibn Arabi in Damascus, and who arranged that Ibn Arabi be buried in the family cemetery of the Banu al-Zaki. (Note: The Ibn al-Zaki family (Banu al-Zaki) were hereditary judges of Damascus since the first half of the 6th/12th centuries. Among many members of this clan, Muhammad b. 'Ali b. al-Zaki al-Qurashi (d. 598/1202), the chief qadi of the Shafi'i madhhab.) He was a descendant of Zaki al-Din 'Ali b. Muhammad b. al-Zaki (d. 564/1169), the Shafi'i chief qadi of Damascus, who formed a powerful political alliance with the 'Asakir family (Banu 'Asakir), whose members occupied prestigious positions as judges and scholars of the Shafi'i school of Sunni law in Damascus for close to three centuries (late eleventh to early fourteenth centuries).
- Sadr al-Din al-Qunawi (d. 672/1273)
- Baybars (d. 676/1277)

=== First vision ===
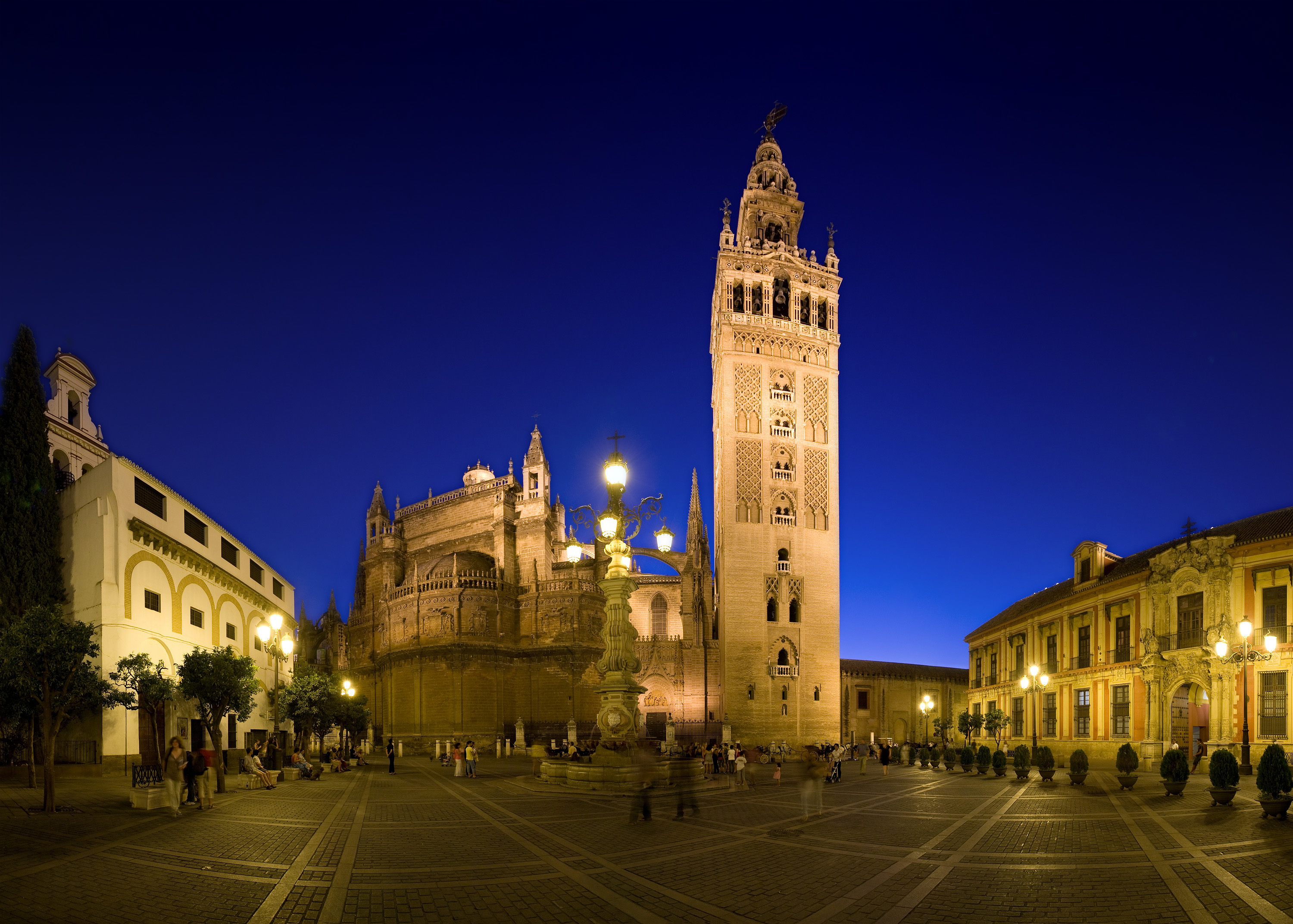
Seville, where Ibn Arabi spent most of his life and education

Ibn Arabi grew up at the ruling court and received military training. In his writing al-Futuhat al-Makkiyya, he confessed he preferred playing in a military camp with his friends rather than reading a book. However, when he was a teenager, he experienced his first vision (fanā) and later wrote of this experience as "the differentiation of the universal reality comprised by that look".

His father, noticing a change in him, mentioned this to philosopher and Judge Ibn Rushd (Averroes), who asked to meet Ibn Arabi. Ibn Arabi said that from this first meeting, he had learned to perceive a distinction between formal knowledge of rational thought and the unveiling of insights into the nature of things. He then adopted Sufism (Tasawwuf) and dedicated his life to the spiritual path.

=== Pilgrimage to Mecca ===
Ibn Arabi left Andalusia for the first time at age 28 and arrived in Tunis in 1193. After a year in Tunisia, he returned to Andalusia in 1194. His father died soon after Ibn Arabi arrived at Seville. When his mother died some months later, he left Andalusia for the second time and traveled with his two sisters to Fez, Morocco in 1195. He returned to Córdoba, Andalusia in 1198, and left Andalusia crossing from Gibraltar for the last time in 1200. While there, he received a vision instructing him to journey east. He then visited various places in the Maghreb, including Fez, where he accepted spiritual mentorship under Mohammed ibn Qasim al-Tamimi. In 1200, he took leave from one of his most important teachers, Shaykh Abu Ya'qub Yusuf ibn Yakhlaf al-Kumi, then living in the town of Salé. He left Tunisia in 1201 and arrived for the Hajj in 1202. He lived in Mecca for three years, and there began writing his work Futūḥāt al-Makkiyya (الفتوحات المكية), The Meccan Illuminations—only part of which has been translated into English by scholars such as Eric Winkel.

=== Journey north ===
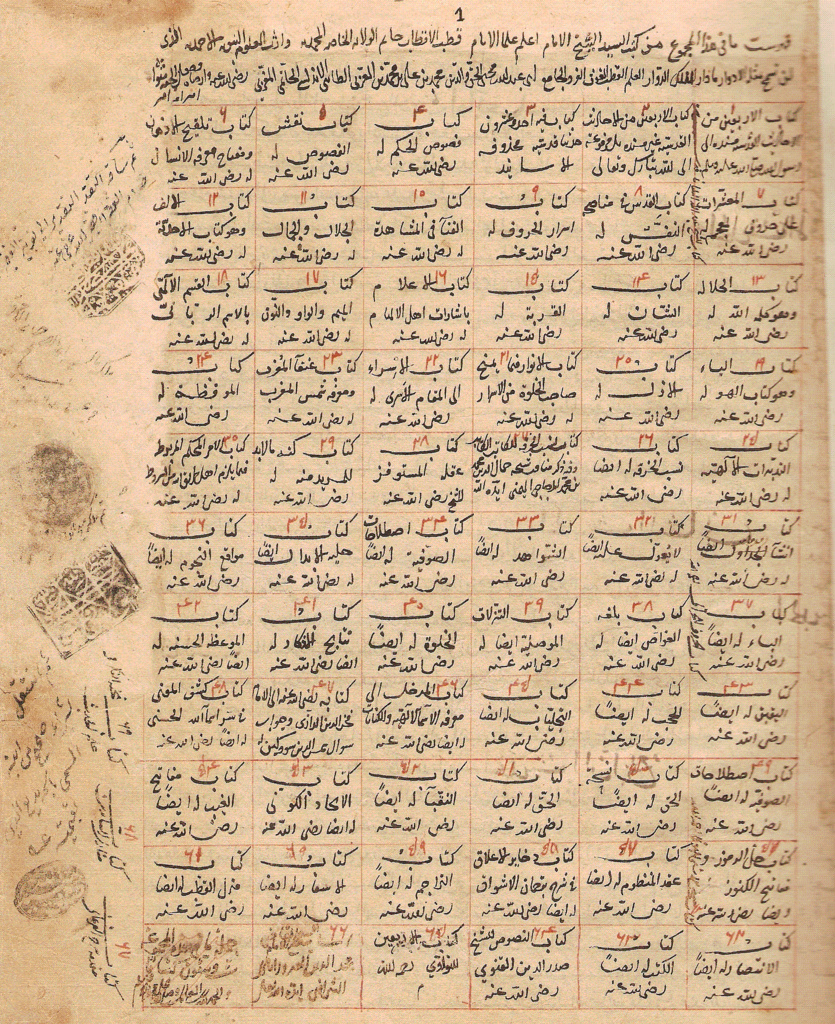
Medieval list of Ibn Arabi's books.

After spending time in Mecca, he traveled across Syria, Palestine, Iraq, and Anatolia. In 1204, ibn Arabi met Majduddīn Isḥāq ibn Yūsuf (شيخ مجد الدين إسحاق بن يوسف), a native of Malatya and a man of great standing at the Seljuk court. Ibn Arabi travelled north; first, they visited Medina, entering Baghdad in 1205. This visit allowed him to meet the direct disciples of Abdul Qadir Gilani. Ibn Arabi stayed there for only 12 days because he wanted to visit Mosul to see his friend, 'Alī ibn 'Abdallāh ibn Jāmi', a disciple of the mystic Qaḍīb al-Bān (471-573 AH/1079-1177;). (Note: Testament to Qaḍīb al-Bān's life exists in a manuscript at the University of Baghdad (no. 541).) He spent the month of Ramaḍan in Mosul, and composed Tanazzulāt al-Mawṣiliyya (تنزلات الموصلية), Kitāb al-Jalāl wa'l-Jamāl (كتاب الجلال والجمال, "The Book of Majesty and Beauty") and Kunh mā lā Budda lil-MurīdMinhu.

=== Return south ===
In 1206, Ibn Arabi visited Jerusalem, Mecca, and Egypt. It was the first time that he had passed through Syria, visiting Aleppo and Damascus.

In 1207, he returned to Mecca, where he continued to study and write, spending his time with his friend Abū Shujā bin Rustam and family, including Niẓām.

The next four to five years of Ibn Arabi's life were spent in these lands. He also kept traveling and holding reading sessions of his works in his presence.

=== Final years ===
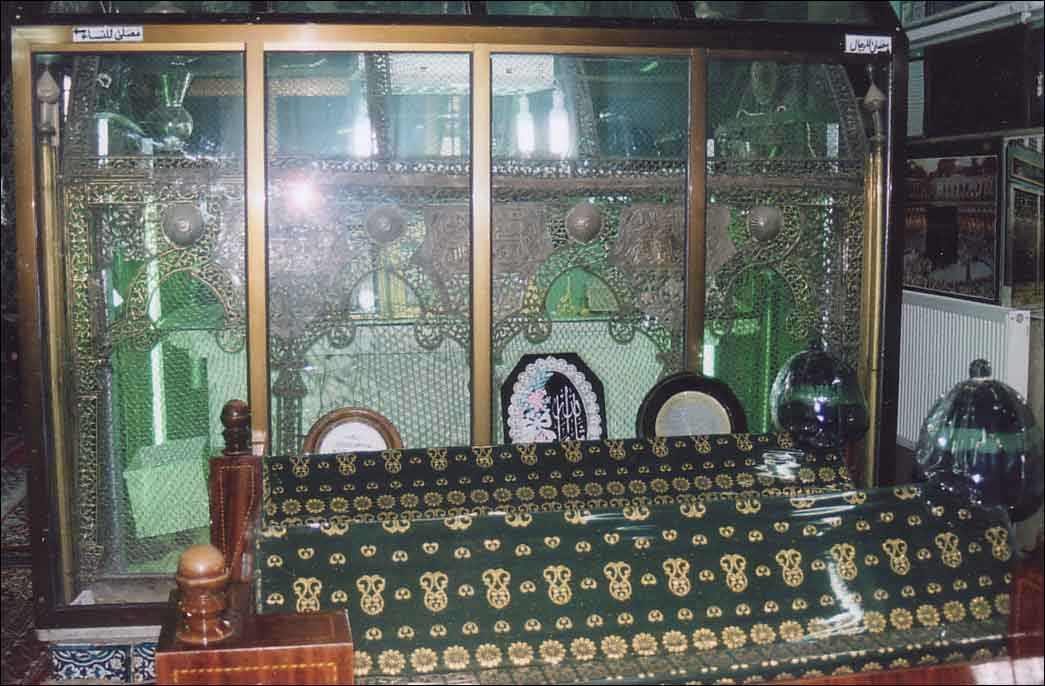
Ibn Arabi's tomb in Damascus

After leaving al-Andalus for the last time in 1198 at the age of 33 and wandering in the Islamic world for 25 years, in 1223, at the age of 58, ibn Arabi chose Damascus as his final home and dedicated his life to teaching and writing. In this city, he composed the Fuṣūṣ al-Ḥikam in 1229 and finalized two manuscripts of Futūḥāt al-Makkiyya in 1231 and 1238.

== Death ==
Ibn Arabi died on 22 Rabī' al-Thānī, 638 AH (16 November 1240), at the age of 75. He was buried in the Banu Zaki cemetery, the family cemetery of the nobles of Damascus, on Qasiyun Hill, Salihiyya, Damascus.

== Legacy ==
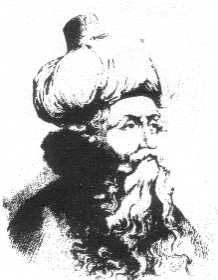
Ibn Arabi as imagined by a later artist

After his death, Ibn Arabi's teachings quickly spread throughout the Islamic world. His writings were not limited to Muslim elites; they spread to other segments of society through the widespread influence of the Sufi orders. Arabi's work also spread widely through works in Persian, Turkish, and Urdu. Many popular poets were trained in the Sufi orders and were inspired by Arabi's concepts.

Contemporary scholars like al-Munawi, Ibn 'Imad al-Hanbali, and al-Fayruzabadi all praised Ibn Arabi as "a righteous friend of Allah and faithful scholar of knowledge", "the absolute mujtahid (independent thinker) without doubt", and "the imam of the people of shari'a both in knowledge and in legacy, the educator of the people of the way in practice and in knowledge, and the shaykh of the shaykhs of the people of truth through spiritual experience ("dhawq") and understanding".

== Islamic law ==
Although Ibn Arabi stated on more than one occasion that he did not blindly follow any one of the madhhab (schools of fiqh, Islamic jurisprudence), he was responsible for copying and preserving books of the literalist Zahiri school, to which there is fierce debate over his adherence. Many prominent ibn Arabi scholars, including Claude Addas, Michel Chodkiewicz, Gril, Eric Winkel, and Mahmoud al-Gorab contend that he did not follow any madhhab. Some scholars, such as Hamza Dudgeon and Ignaz Goldziher, reject this notion. Goldziher held that ibn Arabi belonged either to the Zahiri or Hanbali school.

In an extant manuscript of ibn Hazm, ibn Arabi gives an introduction to the work where he describes a vision he had:

I saw myself in the village of Sharaf near Siville; there I saw a plain on which rose an elevation. On this elevation the Prophet stood, and a man whom I did not know, approached him; they embraced each other so violently that they seemed to interpenetrate and become one person. Great brightness concealed them from the eyes of the people. 'I would like to know,' I thought, 'who is this strange man.' Then I heard some one say: 'This is the traditionalist ʿAlī Ibn Ḥazm.' I had never heard Ibn Ḥazm's name before. One of my shaykhs, whom I questioned, informed me that this man is an authority in the field of science of Hadeeth.

Goldziher says, "The period between the sixth (hijri) and the seventh century seems to have been the prime of the Ẓāhirite school in Andalusia."

Ibn Arabi did delve into specific details at times and was known for his view that religiously-binding ijma (consensus) could only serve as a source of sacred law if it was the consensus of the Companions of Muhammad (Sahabah).

Ibn Arabi also expounded on Sufi allegories of the Sharia, building on the work of al-Ghazali and al-Hakim al-Tirmidhi.

=== Policy on Christians ===
Ibn Arabi, in letters of advice sent to the Sultan of Rum Kaykaus I in 1212, urged him to remove the bells of churches, remove irreligiosity, glorify Islam and humble the unfaithful as to uphold the laws of the Caliph Umar.

[...] that they should not build in the city nor its surroundings a new church, convent, cell, or hermitage, that they should not restore any of these buildings when they were ruined, that they should not prevent any Muslim from living in their churches for three nights and that during those nights they should feed him, that they should not hide any spy or conspire secretly against the Muslims, [...] that they should not resemble Muslims in any way: neither in wearing the cap or turban that they use, nor in wearing shoes, nor in parting their hair, nor in using Muslim given names, nor in using their surnames, nor in using saddles, nor in carrying a sword, nor in carrying weapons of any kind, nor in engraving on their seals with Arabic inscriptions, that they should not sell wine [...], that they not bury their dead near the Muslims, that they not ring their bells except lightly, that they not raise their voices in their churches for liturgical chants in the presence of Muslims, that they not hold the procession of palms in the street, nor raise their voices when burying their dead, nor carry lights in public.

Ibn Arabi continued to exchange letters with Kaykaus I and continued to influence his policies. His advice was also followed by the Mongol viceroy of Anatolia Timurtash, who implemented the policies in part, announcing that non-Muslims should wear conical hats with yellow turbans so that they could be distinguished from the faithful, for "it would exalt Islam and abase the infidel".

== Theoretical mysticism ==
Ibn Arabi is considered to be a foundational figure in the development of Islamic mysticism. During his adolescence and early adulthood, he was exposed to numerous mystical currents that informed his writings. In one of his works, he refers to nearly seventy teachers who influenced his spiritual development. Access to such a broad array of thought was enabled by the vibrant philosophical culture of Al-Andalus in the twelfth and thirteenth centuries, with a variety of mystical movements reflecting the influences of figures like Ibn Barrajan, Ibn Arif, Ibn Rushd, and Ibn Qasi. The social and spiritual atmosphere of the Islamic East also influenced this milieu, owing to philosophers and mystics such as Ibn Sina and Suhrawardi.

=== Knowledge ===
Ibn Arabi distinguished between three types of knowledge. The first is rational knowledge, derived from theoretical reasoning, which he considered fallible and subject to error. The second is dhawq (translated as "taste" or "delight"), a form of experiential knowledge that cannot be attained through rational reflection or expressed through logical argument. Examples include the knowledge of love, pleasure, or sexual experience. The third is mystical or divine knowledge, which transcends the limits of reason. Ibn Arabi believed this form of knowledge was granted to prophets and their spiritual heirs. He held that true knowledge—understood as knowledge of a thing in itself—belongs exclusively to God, rendering human definitions of knowledge ultimately inadequate. For Ibn Arabi, knowledge possessed a divine nature. He maintained that the ultimate reality, or the "Real Being," has eternal self-awareness and manifests as both singular and manifold: one essence known by many names.

=== Imagination ===
In Islamic philosophy before Ibn Arabi, imagination was counted as one faculty among the senses, but Ibn Arabi tried to develop it conceptually. He interpreted imagination as follows: all beings are images of real Being and non-being. In other words, all things have two dimensions, being and non-being. The universe and all other things are counted as imagination, which has a middle nature between sheer reality and utter nothingness. All things are considered as qualities and reflections of one thing. This was known as the theory of unity of existence.

=== Al-Insān al-kāmil ===
The doctrine of perfect man (Al-Insān al-Kāmil) is popularly considered an honorific title attributed to Muhammad, having its origins in Islamic mysticism, although the concept's origin is controversial and disputed. Arabi may have first coined this term in referring to Adam as found in his work Fusus al-hikam, explained as an individual who binds himself with the Divine and creation.

Taking an idea already common within Sufi culture, Ibn Arabi applied deep analysis and reflection on the concept of a perfect human and the pursuit of fulfilling this ideal. In developing his explanation of the perfect being, Ibn Arabi discusses the issue of oneness through the metaphor of the mirror.

In this philosophical metaphor, Ibn Arabi compares an object being reflected in countless mirrors to the relationship between God and his creatures. God's essence is seen in the existent human being, as God is the object and human beings the mirrors. This means two things: that, since humans are mere reflections of God, there can be no distinction or separation between the two, and that, without God, the creatures would be non-existent. When an individual understands that there is no separation between human and God, they begin on the path of ultimate oneness. The one who decides to walk in this oneness pursues the true reality and responds to God's longing to be known. The search within for this reality of oneness causes one to be reunited with God, and improves self-consciousness.

The perfect human, through this developed self-consciousness and self-realization, prompts divine self-manifestation. This causes the perfect human to be of both divine and earthly origin. Ibn Arabi metaphorically calls him an Isthmus. Being an Isthmus between heaven and Earth, the perfect human fulfills God's desire to be known. God's presence can be realized through him by others. Ibn Arabi expressed that through self-manifestation one acquires divine knowledge, which he called 'the primordial spirit of Muhammad and all its perfection'. Ibn Arabi detailed that the perfect human is of the cosmos to the divine and conveys the divine spirit to the cosmos.

Ibn Arabi further explained the perfect man concept using at least twenty-two different descriptions and various aspects when considering the Logos. He contemplated the Logos, or "Universal Man", as a mediation between the individual human and the divine essence.

Ibn Arabi regarded Muhammad as the primary example of the perfect man, embodying the moral attributes of God. He believed that the first entity brought into existence was the reality or essence of Muhammad (al-ḥaqīqa al-Muhammadiyya), considered the master of all creatures and a central model for human emulation. According to Ibn Arabi, God's attributes and names are manifested in the world, with their most complete and perfect expression found in Muhammad. He asserted that one could perceive God through the reflection of Muhammad, maintaining that Muhammad served as the clearest proof of God and that by knowing Muhammad, one could come to know God.

Ibn Arabi also described Adam, Noah, Abraham, Moses, Jesus, and all other prophets and various Anbiya' Allah (Muslim messengers) as perfect men, but primarily attributed lordship, inspirational source, and the highest rank to Muhammad. Ibn Arabi compared his own status as a perfect man as being but a single dimension to the comprehensive nature of Muhammad.

== Reaction ==
The reaction of Ibn 'Abd as-Salam, a Muslim scholar respected by both Ibn Arabi's supporters and detractors, has been of note due to disputes over whether he himself was either a supporter or detractor. He was known by the title of Sultan al-'Ulama, the Sultan of scholars, was a famous mujtahid, Ash'ari theologian, jurist and the leading Shafi'i authority of his generation. As such, the figure of Ibn 'Abd al-Salam was claimed by each faction of the Ibn-'Arabi controversy due to his impeccable record as a staunch champion of the Shari'a.

Ibn Taymiyyah's report was based on the authority of two reliable transmitters, Abu Bakr b. Salar and Ibn Daqiq al-'Id. According to it, Ibn 'Abd al-Salam declared Ibn 'Arabi "a master of evil" and "a disgusting man", who "professed the eternity of the world and did not proscribe fornication." This severe verdict, whose authenticity Ibn Taymiyyah considered to be beyond doubt, was pronounced by Ibn 'Abd al-Salam upon his arrival in Egypt in 639/1241- that is, one year after his death. The versions of the story furnished by al-Safadi, a cautious supporter of Ibn 'Arabi, and al-Dhahabi, his bitter critic, and teacher of al-Safadi, are especially helpful in placing Ibn 'Abd al-Salam's censure into a meaningful historical framework. Both al-Safadi and al-Dhahabi insisted that they read the story recorded in Ibn Sayyid al-Nas's own hand. And yet, their versions vary.

Both variants describe Ibn Daqiq al-'Id's astonishment at his teacher's sharp critique of the acclaimed wali, which caused him to ask for proof of Ibn 'Arabi's lies. Ibn 'Abd al-Salam obliged by the following reply (in al-Safadi's recension): "He used to deny [the possibility] of marriage between human beings and the jinn, since, according to him, the jinn are subtle spirits, whereas human beings are solid bodies, hence the two cannot unite. Later on, however, he claimed that he had married a woman from the jinnfolk, who stayed with him for a while, then hit him with a camel's bone and injured him. He used to show us the scar on his face which, by that time, had closed." In al-Dhahabi's rendition: "He [Ibn 'Arabi] said: I married a she-jinni, and she blessed me with three children. Then it so happened that I made her angry and she hit me with a bone that caused this scar, whereupon she departed and I have never seen her again since." The authenticity of Ibn 'Abd al-Salam's disparagement of Ibn 'Arabi seems to find support in his "Epistle on the [Saintly] Substitutes and the [Supreme] Succor" (Risala fil-'abdal wal-ghawth).

On the other hand, another narration in praise of Ibn 'Arabi by al-Izz is reported by 'Abd al-Ghaffar al-Qusi, al-Fayruzabadi, al-Qari al-Baghdadi, al-Suyuti, al-Sha'rani, al-Maqqari, Ibn al-'Imad, and some other supporters. Despite minor variations in their accounts, all of them cite the same source: lbn 'Abd al-Salam's unnamed servant or student. In al-Qusi's redaction, Ibn 'Abd al Salam and his servant were passing by Ibn 'Arabi, who instructed his disciples in the Great Umayyad Mosque of Damuscus. Suddenly, the servant recalled that Ibn 'Abd al-Salam had promised to reveal to him the identity of the supreme saint of the epoch, the "Pole of the Age". The question caught Ibn 'Abd al-Salam off guard. He paused hesitantly for a moment, then pointed in the direction of Ibn 'Arabi, saying: "He is the Pole!" "And in spite of what you have said against him?" asked the servant. Ibn 'Abd al-Salam ignored this remark and simply repeated his reply. In al-Fayruzabadi's version of the story, Ibn 'Abd al-Salam is presented as a secret admirer of his who was fully aware of the latter's exalted status in the Sufi hierarchy. However, as a public figure, Ibn 'Abd al-Salam was careful to conceal his genuine opinion of the controversial Sufi to "preserve the outward aspect of the religious law". In so doing, he, according to al-Fayruzabadi, shrewdly avoided an inevitable confrontation with the "jurists," who viewed Ibn 'Arabi as a heretic.

The importance of Ibn 'Abd al-Salam's ambiguous evaluation of Ibn Arabi for the subsequent polemic is further attested by the detailed treatment of this story in al-Fasi's massive biographical dictionary, "The Precious Necklace" (al-'lqd al-thamin). A bitter critic of Ibn 'Arabi's monistic views, al-Fasi rejected the Sufi version of the story as sheer fabrication. Yet, as a scrupulous muhaddith, he tried to justify his position through the methods current in hadith criticism: "I have a strong suspicion that this story was invented by the extremist Sufis who were infatuated with Ibn 'Arabi. Thereupon the story gained wide diffusion until it reached some trustworthy people, who accepted it in good faith .... My suspicion regarding the authenticity of this story has grown stronger because of the unfounded supposition that Ibn 'Abd al-Salam's praise of Ibn 'Arabi had occurred simultaneously with his censure of him. Ibn 'Abd al-Salam's statement that he censured Ibn 'Arabi out of concern for the shari'a inescapably implies that Ibn 'Arabi enjoyed a high rank in the same moment as Ibn 'Abd al-Salam was censuring him. Such a blunder could not have happened to any reliable religious scholar, let alone to someone as knowledgeable and righteous as Ibn 'Abd al-Salam. Anyone who suspects him of this makes a mistake and sins [by holding him responsible for] mutually contradictory statements .... One may try to explain Ibn 'Abd al-Salam's praise of Ibn 'Arabi, if it indeed took place, by the fact that [Ibn 'Abd al-Salam] was hesitating between praise and censure, because at the time he spoke Ibn 'Arabi's state had changed for the better. If so, there is no contradiction in Ibn 'Abd al-Salam's words. Were we to admit that the praise occurred, it was nevertheless abrogated by Ibn Daqiq al-'Id's report concerning lbn 'Abd al-Salam's [later] condemnation of lbn 'Arabi. For Ibn Daqiq al-'Id could only hear Ibn 'Abd al-Salam in Egypt, that is, a few years after Ibn 'Arabi's death. This cannot be otherwise because he ... was educated at Qus, where he had studied the Maliki madhhab, until he mastered it completely. Only then he come to Cairo to study the Shafi'i madhhab and other sciences under Ibn 'Abd al-Salam's guidance. ... His departure could only take place after 640, by which time Ibn 'Arabi had already been dead. ... Now, Ibn 'Abd al-Salam's praise, as the story itself testifies, occurred when Ibn 'Arabi was still alive. For did he not point to [Ibn 'Arabi], when that individual [the servant] asked him about the Pole or the [greatest] saint of the age?"

=== Creed ===
His best-known book, entitled 'al-Futuhat al-Makkiyya' (The Meccan Victories or Illuminations) begins with a statement of doctrine (belief) about which al-Safadi (d. 764/1363) said: "I saw (read) that (al-Futuhat al-Makkiyya) from beginning to end. It consists of the doctrine of Abu al-Hasan al-Ash'ari without any difference (deviation) whatsoever."

== Works ==
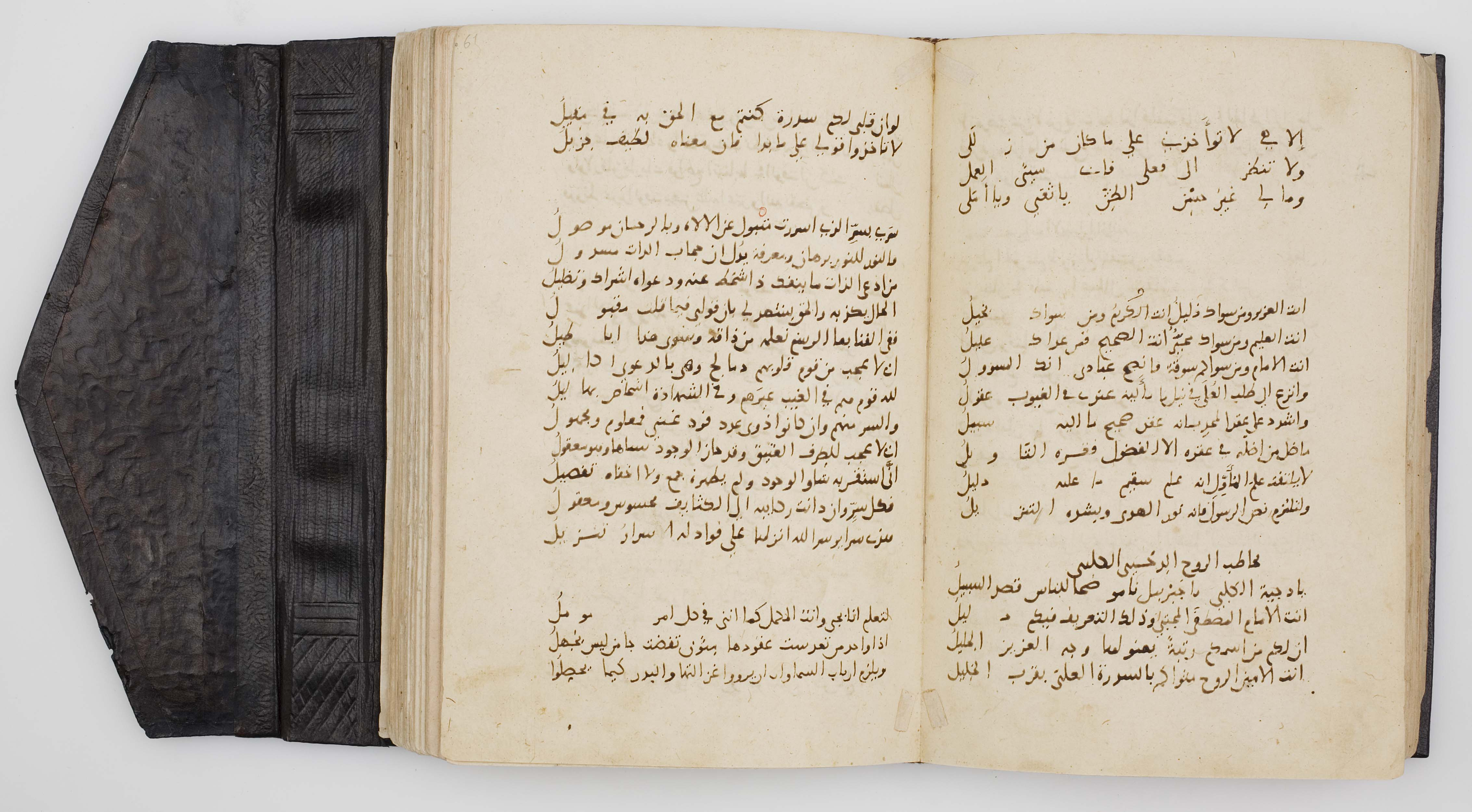
Page from a Syrian manuscript of Ibn Arabi's six-volume Dīwān.

Approximately 800 works are attributed to Ibn Arabi, although only some have been authenticated. Recent research suggests that over 100 of his works have survived in manuscripts, though most printed versions remain unedited and contain many errors. William Chittick, a specialist on Ibn 'Arabi, citing Osman Yahya's definitive bibliography, states that of the 850 works attributed to him, around 700 are authentic, and over 400 remain extant.

- The Meccan Illuminations (Al-Futūḥāt al-Makkiyya), his largest work in 37 volumes originally and published in 4 or 8 volumes in modern times, discussing a wide range of topics from mystical philosophy to Sufi practices and records of his dreams/visions. It totals 560 chapters. In modern editions, it amounts to some 15,000 pages.
- The Ringstones of Wisdom (also translated as The Bezels of Wisdom), or Fusus al-Hikam. Composed during the later period of Ibn 'Arabi's life, the work is sometimes considered his most important and can be characterized as a summary of his teachings and mystical beliefs. It deals with the role played by various prophets in divine revelation. The attribution of this work (Fusus al-Hikam) to Ibn Arabi is debated and in at least one source is described as a forgery and false attribution to him reasoning that there are 74 books in total attributed to Sheikh Ibn Arabi of which 56 have been mentioned in "Al Futuhat al-Makkiyya" and the rest mentioned in the other books cited therein. However, many other scholars accept the work as genuine.
- The Dīwān, his collection of poetry spanning five volumes, mostly unedited. The printed versions available are based on only one volume of the original work.
- The Holy Spirit in the Counselling of the Soul (Rūḥ al-quds), a treatise on the soul which includes a summary of his experience from different spiritual masters in the Maghrib. Part of this has been translated as Sufis of Andalusia, reminiscences and spiritual anecdotes about many interesting people whom he met in al-Andalus.
- Contemplation of the Holy Mysteries (Mashāhid al-Asrār), probably his first major work, consisting of fourteen visions and dialogues with God.
- Divine Sayings (Mishkāt al-Anwār), an important collection made by Ibn 'Arabī of 101 hadīth qudsī
- The Book of Annihilation in Contemplation (K. al-Fanā' fi'l-Mushāhada), a short treatise on the meaning of mystical annihilation (fana).
- Devotional Prayers (Awrād), a widely read collection of fourteen prayers for each day and night of the week.
- Journey to the Lord of Power (Risālat al-Anwār), a detailed technical manual and roadmap for the "journey without distance".
- The Book of God's Days (Ayyām al-Sha'n), a work on the nature of time and the different kinds of days experienced by gnostics
- The Astounding Phoenix regarding the Seal of Saints and the Sun of the West (Arabic: عنقاء مغرب في معرفة ختم الأولياء وشمس المغرب, ALA-LC: ʻAnqāʼ al-Mughrib fī Maʻrifat Khatm al-Awliyāʼ wa-Shams al-Maghrib), a book on the meaning of sainthood and its culmination in Jesus and the Mahdī
- The Universal Tree and the Four Birds (al-Ittihād al-Kawnī), a poetic book on the Complete Human and the four principles of existence
- Prayer for Spiritual Elevation and Protection ('al-Dawr al-A'lā), a short prayer which is still widely used in the Muslim world
- The Interpreter of Desires (Tarjumān al-Ashwāq), a collection of nasībs which, in response to critics, Ibn Arabi republished with a commentary explaining the meaning of the poetic symbols. (1215)
- Divine Governance of the Human Kingdom (At-Tadbidrat al-ilahiyyah fi islah al-mamlakat al-insaniyyah).
- The Four Pillars of Spiritual Transformation (Hilyat al-abdāl) a short work on the essentials of the spiritual Path

=== The Meccan Illuminations (Futūḥāt al-Makkiyya) ===
According to Claude Addas, Ibn Arabi began writing Futūḥāt al-Makkiyya after he arrived in Mecca in 1202. After almost thirty years, the first draft of Futūḥāt was completed in December 1231 (629 AH), and Ibn Arabi bequeathed it to his son. Two years before his death, Ibn 'Arabī finished a second draft of the Futūḥāt in 1238 (636 AH), of which included several additions and deletions as compared with the previous draft, that contains 560 chapters. The second draft, the more widely circulated version, was bequeathed to his disciple, Sadr al-Din al-Qunawi. Many scholars have attempted to translate this book from Arabic into other languages, but there is no complete translation of Futūḥāt al-Makkiyya to this day.

Diagram of "Plain of Assembly" (Ard al-Hashr) on the Day of Judgment, from autograph manuscript of Futuhat al-Makkiyya, ca. 1238 (photo: after Futuhat al-Makkiyya, Cairo edition, 1911).

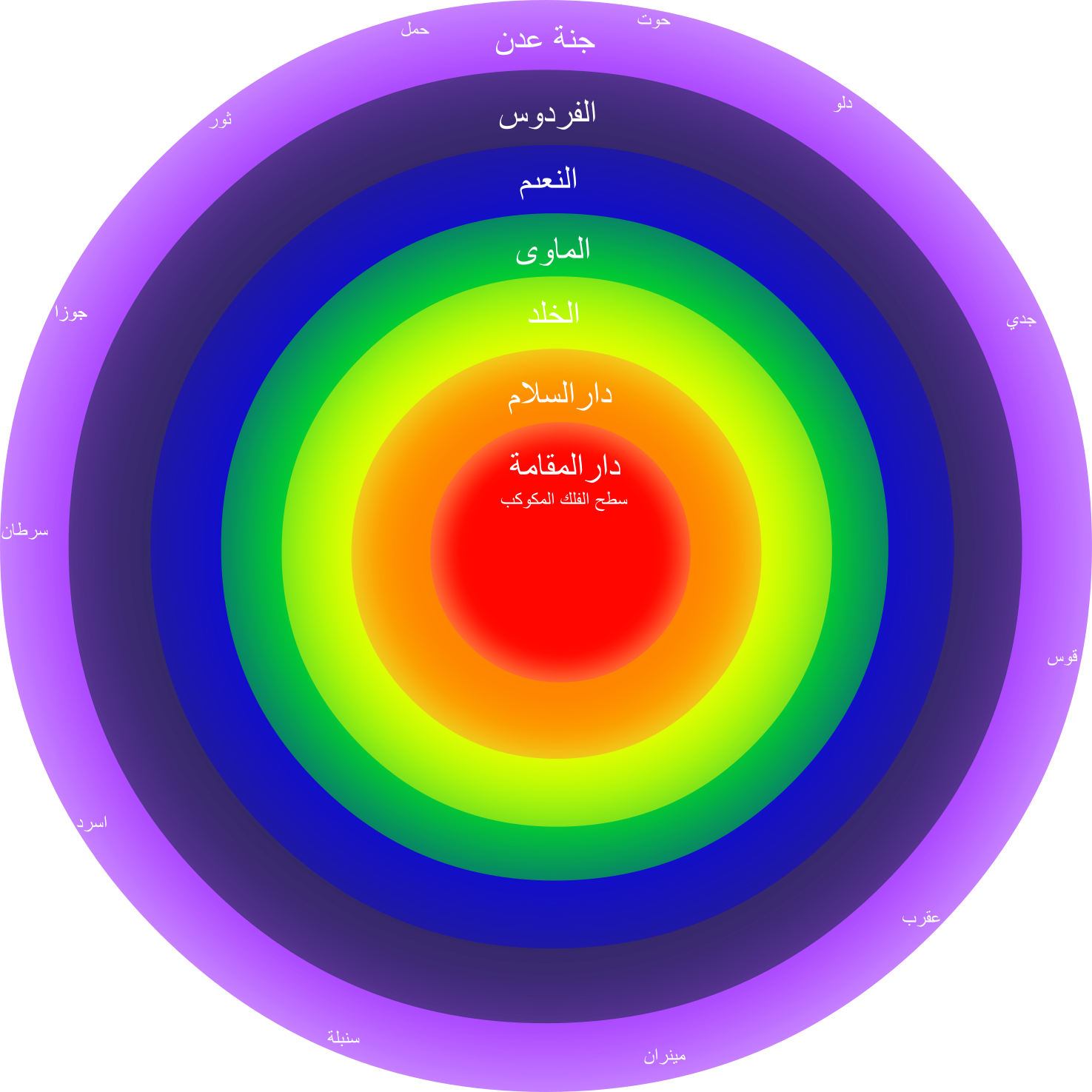
Diagram of Jannat Futuhat al-Makkiyya, c. 1238 (photo: after Futuhat al-Makkiyya, Cairo edition, 1911).

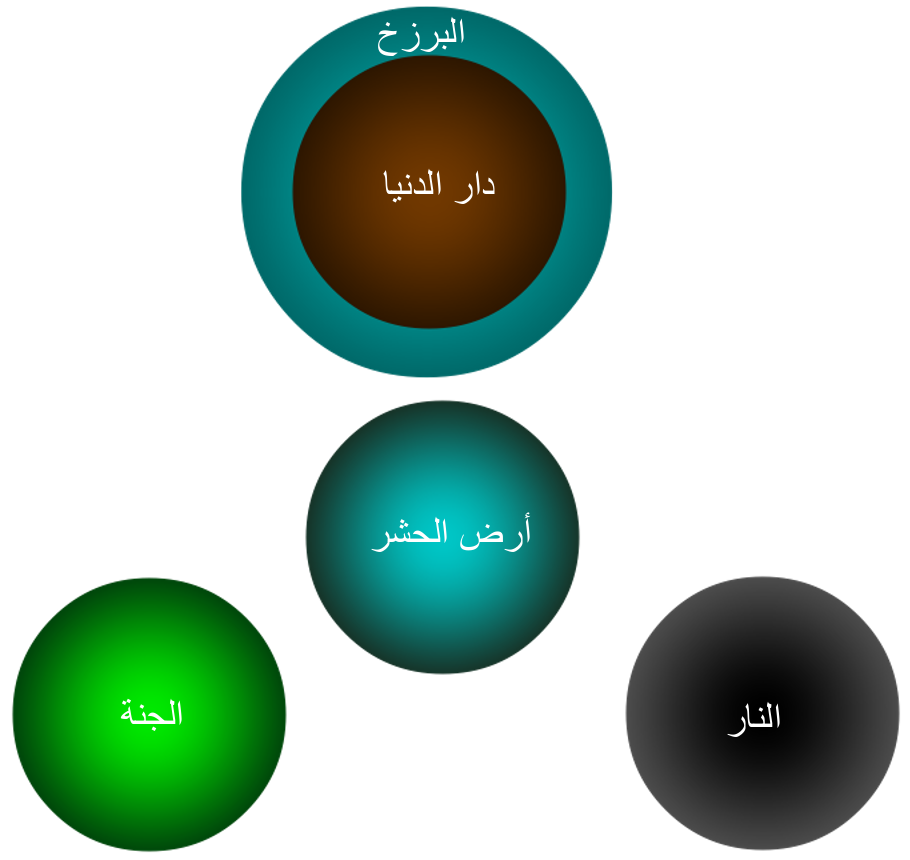
Diagram showing world, heaven, hell and barzakh Futuhat al-Makkiyya, c. 1238 (photo: after Futuhat al-Makkiyya, Cairo edition, 1911).

=== The Bezels of Wisdom (Fuṣūṣ al-Ḥikam) ===
There have been many commentaries on Ibn 'Arabī's Fuṣūṣ al-Ḥikam: Osman Yahya named more than 100 while Michel Chodkiewicz precises that "this list is far from exhaustive." The first one was Kitab al-Fukūk written by Ṣadr al-Dīn al-Qunawī who had studied the book with Ibn 'Arabī; the second by Qunawī's student, Mu'ayyad al-Dīn al-Jandi, which was the first line-by-line commentary; the third by Jandī's student, Dawūd al-Qaysarī, which became very influential in the Persian-speaking world. A recent English translation of Ibn 'Arabī's own summary of the Fuṣūṣ, Naqsh al-Fuṣūṣ (The Imprint or Pattern of the Fusus) as well a commentary on this work by 'Abd al-Raḥmān Jāmī, Naqd al-Nuṣūṣ fī Sharḥ Naqsh al-Fuṣūṣ (1459), by William Chittick was published in Volume 1 of the Journal of the Muhyiddin Ibn 'Arabi Society (1982).

==== Critical editions and translations of Fuṣūṣ al-Ḥikam ====
The Fuṣūṣ was first critically edited in Arabic by 'Afīfī (1946) that become the standard in scholarly works. Later in 2015, Ibn al-Arabi Foundation in Pakistan published the Urdu translation, including the new critical of Arabic edition.

The first English translation was done in partial form by Angela Culme-Seymour from the French translation of Titus Burckhardt as Wisdom of the Prophets (1975), and the first full translation was by Ralph Austin as Bezels of Wisdom (1980). There is also a complete French translation by Charles-Andre Gilis, entitled Le livre des chatons des sagesses (1997). The only major commentary to have been translated into English so far is entitled Ismail Hakki Bursevi's translation and commentary on Fusus al-hikam by Muhyiddin Ibn 'Arabi, translated from Ottoman Turkish by Bulent Rauf in 4 volumes (1985–1991).

In Urdu, the most widespread and authentic translation was made by Shams Ul Mufasireen Bahr-ul-uloom Hazrat (Muhammad Abdul Qadeer Siddiqi Qadri -Hasrat), the former Dean and Professor of Theology of the Osmania University, Hyderabad. It is due to this reason that his translation is in the curriculum of Punjab University. Maulvi Abdul Qadeer Siddiqui has made an interpretive translation and explained the terms and grammar while clarifying the Shaikh's opinions. A new edition of the translation was published in 2014 with brief annotations throughout the book for the benefit of contemporary Urdu reader.

== In fiction ==
In the Turkish television series Diriliş: Ertuğrul, Ibn Arabi was portrayed by Ozman Sirgood. In 2017, Saudi Arabian novelist Mohammed Hasan Alwan won the International Prize for Arabic Fiction for his novel A Small Death, a fictionalized account of Ibn Arabi's life.

== See also ==
- Ibn Sufi
- Ain al-Kheil Mosque
- Hossein Nasr
- Ibn Masarra
- Ivan Aguéli
- List of Sufis
- Mahmud Shabistari
- Miguel Asín Palacios
- Mohyeddin
- Muhyiddin Ibn Arabi Society
- Mujaddid
- Transcendent theosophy
