= Ocaña, an Intermittent Portrait =

1978 film

- Directed by: Ventura Pons
- Screenplay by: Ventura Pons
- Produced by: José María Forn
- Starring: José Pérez Ocaña; Camilo; María de la Rambla; Nazario; Paco de Alcoy
- Cinematography: Lucho Poirot
- Music by: Aurelio Villa
- Production companies: Prozesa; Teide P.C.
- Distributed by: Producciones Zeta
- Release date: 1 June 1978
- Running time: 85 minutes
- Country: Spain
- Language: Spanish

Ocaña, an Intermittent Portrait (Ocaña, retrato intermitente) is a 1978 Spanish documentary film directed by Ventura Pons. It shows post-Franco Barcelona through the eyes of the artist José Pérez Ocaña.

== Plot ==
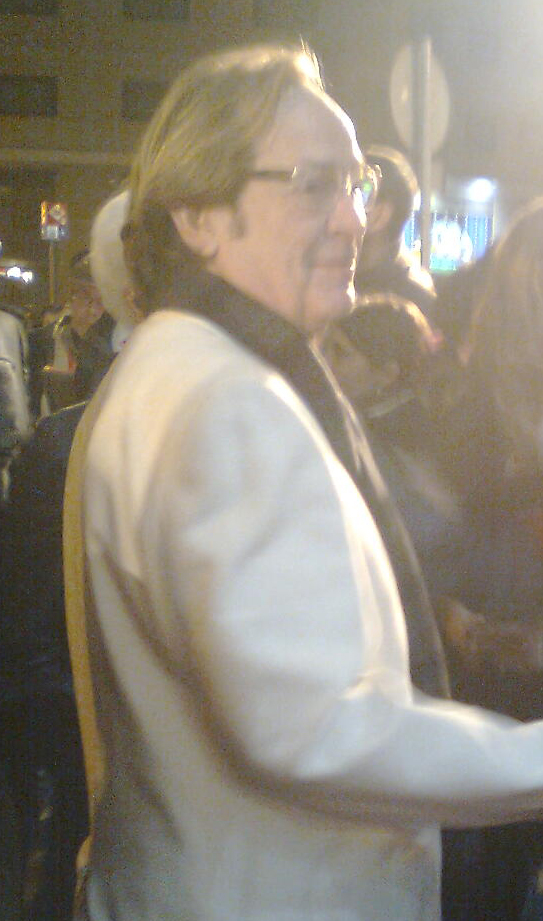
Ventura Pons made his cinematic debut with this documentary about José Pérez Ocaña.

The painter José Pérez Ocaña explains his alternative lifestyle and opinions about religion, fetishism, art, and more. He also paints a revealing portrait of Barcelona at the beginning of the Transition, when he lived there. He also shows its gay scene during a time in which la Ley de peligrosidad social, which was used to outlaw homosexuality, was still in effect.

Ocaña strains against social conventions and sexual repression, an attitude that's a symptom of his own life and experiences in Cantillana, the Sevillan town in which he grew up. He adds later adds that people are the only thing he believes in, that he rejects any type of labels that would classify him or anyone else. Throughout the documentary, he reclaims himself through his body, through his performance, and through his work as painter and sculptor. The film includes some of his performances in a cemetery and in la Rambla of Barcelona. He says that he is not a travesti but rather a performance artist, referencing the power that he believes the individual has to act freely.

His view of politics, like that of religion, goes beyond political parties or the Catholic Church. His approach to religion is closer to popular folklore and the devotion seen in typical Andalusian festivals and romerías than Catholic doctrine.

== Cast ==
- José Pérez Ocaña as himself
- Camilo as himself
- Guillermo as himself
- Nazario as himself
- Paco De Alcoy as himself
- María De la Rambla as herself
- Ventura Pons as Entrevistador (voice) (uncredited)

== Production ==
Shot in 1977, Ocaña, an Intermittent Portrait was the first film made by director Ventura Pons. It was filmed entirely in Barcelona. No part of the film was scripted or planned ahead. There are interviews not only from Ocaña, but also from several other figures from the Catalonian counterculture of the 1970s like Nazario, Camilo, Paco de Alcoy, and María de la Rambla.

It was produced by Josep Maria Forn and José Antonio Pérez Giner for the companies Prozesa and Teide P.C. It was shot in color and 35mm form, and runs for 85 minutes.

== Festival appearances ==
Presented in the section "Un certain regard" of the Cannes Film Festival of 1978 and in the Chicago Festival of 1979, the film debuted on Spanish screens on 1 June 1978. It was also screened at the Festival Divers València Mostra de Cinema LGBT in February 2018 at Cines Albatexas in Valencia, Spain.

== Themes ==
One of the most distinct characteristics of the film, as Fernando Trueba points out in his review for el Diario El País, is how it shows a subversive and transgressive personality without criticism. Trueba states that the documentary is a film as arrogant as the character that it portrays and who cannot be considered a brat but rather a complex, contradictory, and engaging person.

The film has been well-received among websites dedicated to film criticism. On FilmAffinity España, it has a 6.7 out of 10 based on 431 reviews.
