= Mohammed ibn Qasim al-Tamimi =

Moroccan Arab hadith scholar and biographer

Personal life
- Born: Abu Abd Allah Mohammed ibn Qasim ibn Abd ar-Rahman ibn al-Karim al-Tamimi al-Fasi; 1140/5 Fez, Morocco
- Died: 1207/8 Fez, Morocco
- Notable work: Al-Mustafād fī manāqib al-ʿubbād bi-madīnat Fās wa-mā yalīhā min al-bilād
- Occupation: Hadith Scholar, Biographer

Religious life
- Religion: Islam

Muslim leader
- Influenced by: Abu Madyan
- Influenced: Ibn Arabi

Al-Tamimi, in full Abū ʿAbd Allāh Muḥammad ibn Qāsim ibn ʿAbd al-Raḥmān ibn al-Karīm al-Tamīmī al-Fāsī (Arabic: أبو عبد الله محمد بن قاسم بن عبد الرحمن بن الكريم التميمي الفاسي) (born 1140/5, died 1207/8) was a Moroccan Arab hadith scholar and biographer, author of Al-Mustafād fī manāqib al-ʿubbād bi-madīnat Fās wa-mā yalīhā min al-bilād. Al-Tamimi hailed from the Banu Tamim tribe which settled in al-Maghreb and al-Andalus.

This book comprises 81 biographies of Moroccan saints. He wrote a fahrasa in which he recorded the names of his teachers and the works he studied under them, called An-Najm al-mushiqa (The resplendent Star). He studied under Abu Madyan. There are also many references to At-Tamimi in the work of Ibn al-Arabi.
