= Ali ibn Harzihim =

12th-century Moroccan Sufi teacher

Sidi Ali ibn Harzihim (Arabic: علي بن حرزهم) or Abul Hasan Ali ibn Ismail ibn Mohammed ibn Abdallah ibn Harzihim/Hirzihim (also: Sidi Hrazem or Sidi Harazim) was born in Fes, Morocco and died in that same city in 559/1163. He was a Berber Sufi teacher, leader of a Ghazalian zawiya in Fes and was the spiritual master of Abu Madyan. The water source "Sidi Harazim" was called after him.

== Bibliography ==
- Abu Yaqub Yusuf ibn al-Zayyat al-Tadili (d. 1230/1), Kitab al-tashawuf ila rijal al-tasawwuf (Rabat, 1997)
- The way of Abu Madyan, Appendix I: text and translation of "al-Qasida al-Nuniyya", a work attributed to ‘Ali ibn Hirzihim, 1996, ISBN 0-946621-35-7
