= Ibn al-Zayyat =

Ibn al-Zayyat or Ibn az-Zayyat is an Arabic patronymic meaning "son of the oil merchant". It can refer to:

- Muhammad ibn al-Zayyat (died 847), Abbasid vizier
- Ibn az-Zayyat (governor of Tarsus) (fl. 956–962), Hamdanid governor of Tarsus
- Ibn al-Zayyat al-Tadili (died 1229/30), Sufi mystic from Morocco
