= José Pérez Ocaña =

Spanish artist and LGBT rights activist

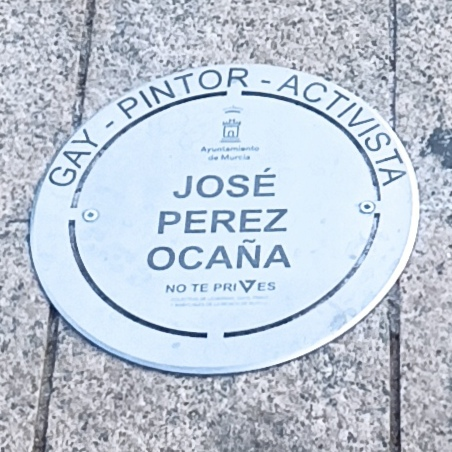
- Commemorative plaque in Murcia's Plaza de la Diversidad
- Born: 24 March 1947; Cantillana, Seville, Spain
- Died: 18 September 1983 (36 years old); Cantillana, Seville, Spain
- Other name: Ocaña
- Citizenship: Spain
- Occupations: Painter and LGBT rights activist
- Movement: Anarchism

José Pérez Ocaña (Cantillana, Seville, 24 March 1947 - 18 September 1983), also known as Ocaña, was a performer artist, painter, and Spanish LGBT rights activist.

Ocaña was a central figure in Barcelona's counter-culture movement during the Spanish transition to democracy, at a time of particular vitality. His performances and artistic endeavours, much like his own life, have been considered pioneers of sexual and gender disobedience practices in Spain, in the fields of both queer activism and art history. He also stood out as an icon of opposition to Francoism and its social conventions in the final years of the regime, from an anarchist perspective.

== Biography ==
Born in Cantillana, a town in the province of Seville. As a visible homosexual, he abandoned his home town in 1971 and moved to Barcelona, where he would develop his artistic life and work as a decorative painter in order to make a living.

His work encompassed painting, handicrafts, installations and public actions. The latter, combined with his life as a visible figure in Barcelona's contemporary counter-cultural scene, were especially popular. He was known to frequent las Ramblas, where he walked around cross-dressing with friends and collaborators such as Camilo or Nazario. His performances were disruptive to the social conventions and gender stereotypes of late Francoism, which has led him to be considered a precedent for queer activism.

Identifying as an anarchist, Ocaña, alongside Camilo and Nazario, performed an unscheduled ballet during the 1977 Jornadas Libertarias Internacionales, held in Parc Güell and organised by the CNT. The performance, which contained several sexual, satirical and Andalusian folklore elements, was condemned by the state leadership of the CNT, to which the organisers responded by threatening to resign if they were not allowed to repeat it for the remaining days. After that, Ocaña began to define himself as "libertarian" in order to distance himself from the anarcho-syndicalist orthodoxy.

In 1977 he further participated in the first Pride demonstration in Barcelona, where his non-normative appearance was also controversial. The following year he was detained on the Ramblas alongside Nazario and subsequently beaten, triggering a protest for his release and that of his fellow companions.

In his work and aesthetic he embedded numerous elements of Andalusian folk religion, redefining them as counter-cultural elements and incorporating them into his art. In addition to his performances, the centrality of these elements in the exhibitions Un poco de Andalucía (Galería Mec-Mec, 1977) and La Primavera (Antiguo Hospital de la Santa Creu, 1982).

In the field of cinema, he was the protagonist of the documentaries Ocaña: an Intermittent Portrait (Ocaña, retrato intermitente, 1978), directed by Ventura Pons and Ocaña, der engel in er qual singt (1979), directed by Gérard Courant. In the following years he starred in the film Manderley (1981) and the short film Silencis (1982). The posthumous documentary Ocaña: la memoria del sol (2009) analysed his persona based on archive material, images and unpublished testimonies.

In September 1983 he returned to Cantillana to celebrate the youth festivities of the Semana de la Juventud and to be reunited with his family. There he made and wore a costume made of paper and cloth, which included a papier-mâché sun with sparklers attached. It caught fire and he was badly burned. Although his burns were progressively healing, the general weakening of his body led to a resurgence of his longstanding hepatitis, which led to his death on 18 September 1983.

== Homages ==
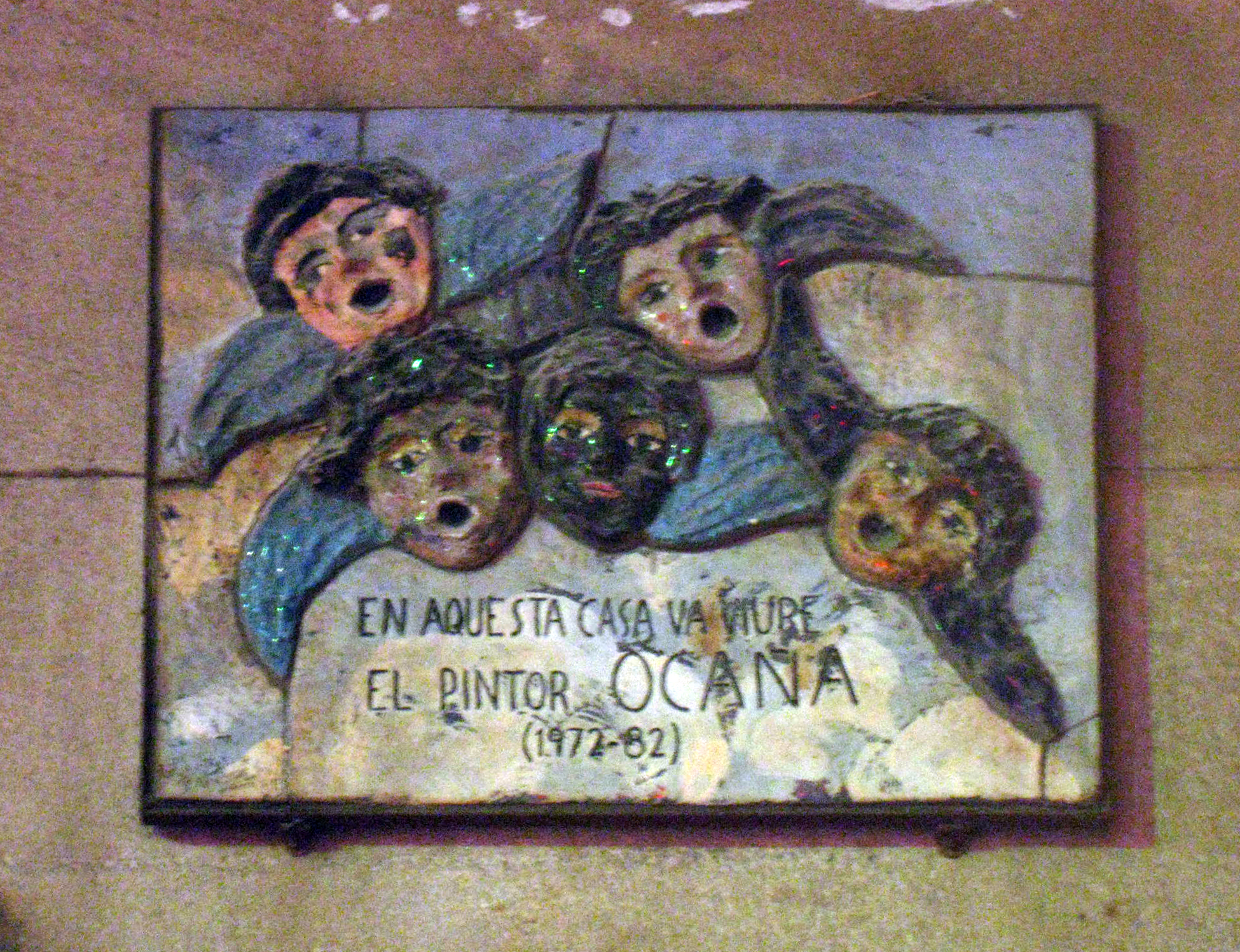
Plaque on the house of the Royal Square (in Spanish: Plaza Real; in Catalan: Plaça Reial) in Barcelona, where Ocaña lived.

In the artistic world, Ocaña has been the object of various tributes on behalf of contemporary artists and later generations. The cartoonist Nazario paid tribute to him in the comic Alí Babá y los 40 maricones. Carlos Cano dedicated the song "Romance a Ocaña" (1985) to the artist, later covered by María Dolores Pradera.

In the field of theatre, Marc Rosich dedicated the work Copi i Ocaña al Purgatori (2015), and Unai Izquierdo, Ocaña (2017). In 2019, the musical piece Ocaña Königin der Ramblas, conducted by Rosich, premiered at the Neukölln Opera. Since 2010 the Reina Sofía Museum has housed the José Pérez Ocaña Archive.

At an institutional level, he was awarded the Adriano Antinoo Honorary Prize in 2014 in recognition of his activism.

In 2018 the Ocaña Exhibition Centre was inaugurated in his native town, which hosts 54 of the artists paintings, photos, sculptures and posters, personal objects and videos of the works and installations. A good part of his photos are from the photographer Colita, who donated them to the museum in 2020. In 2019 the town council created the Ocaña National Painting Prize.

On 15 October 2020 the City Council of Seville agreed to grant him a street in the Andalusian capital, where a monolith was installed in tribute to his life.

In 2024, "Yo, Ocaña", a documentary on his life and work, directed by Gemma Soriano and Pilar Granero, was released on TVE, featuring information previously unknown until now. Among those taking part are the artist's brothers, Jesús and Rafael Pérez Ocaña, Nazario Luque, the photographer Marta Sentís and French gallery owner and friend Annick Jaccard-Beugnet, who contributed unpublished sound recordings of Ocaña to the film for a book of his memories that never saw the light of day.

== Works ==
=== Film ===
- Show de otoño (Carles Comas, 1976).
- Ocaña, retrato intermitente (Ventura Pons, 1978).
- Ocaña, der engel in er qual singt (Gérard Courant, 1979).
- Manderley (Jesús Garay, 1981).
- Silencis (Xavier-Daniel, 1982).

=== Expositions ===
- Un poco de Andalucía. Galería Mec-Mec (1977).
- La Primavera. Antiguo Hospital de la Santa Creu (1982).
- Incienso. Museo Municipal de Santander (1983).
- Ocaña 1973-1983: Acciones, actuaciones, activismo. La Virreina, Centro Cultural Montehermoso Kulturunea (2011).
- Entorn Ocaña. Fundació Setba (2009).
- Àngels i dimonis. Fundació Setba (2012).
- Viaje al fin de la Tierra. Ocaña, serie ''Galicia, 1976-1979''. Cavecanem (2014).
- La gran primavera andaluza de Ocaña. Antología de la obra pictórica de José Pérez Ocaña 1947-1983. Palacio de la Merced (2016).
- Ocaña, la pintura travestida. Espacio Turina (2017).
- La Ocaña. Galería Mayoral (2024).

== Bibliography ==
- Barea, Carlos (ed.). (2023). Ocaña. El eterno brillo del Sol de Cantillana. Dos Bigotes. ISBN 978-84-126535-7-1
- García Romero, Pedro (ed.). (2011). Ocaña, 1973-1983: Acciones, Actuaciones, Activismo. Polígrafa. ISBN 9788498503579
- Jaccard-Beugnet, Annick (ed.). (1984). Jose-Luis Perez Ocaña: 1947-1983. Artemis. ISBN 2950065007
- Mérida Jiménez, Rafael M. (ed.). (2018). Ocaña. Voces, ecos y distorsiones. Bellaterra. ISBN 9788472908826
- Naranjo-Ferrari, José. (2013). Ocaña, artista y mito contracultural, análisis de la figura y legado artístico de José Pérez Ocaña (1947-1983) como testimonio y producto sociocultural de la transición española (tesis doctoral). Universidad de Sevilla.
- V.V. A.A. (2017). La gran primavera andaluza de Ocaña. Antología de la obra pictórica de José Pérez Ocaña 1947-1983. Diputación de Córdoba. ISBN 8481545309
