= Moulay Bouazza =

Moulay Bouazza مولاي بوعزة
- Town
- Location within Morocco
- Coordinates: 33°13′27″N 6°11′53″W
- Country: Morocco
- Region: Béni Mellal-Khénifra
- Province: Khénifra Province

Population (2004)
  - Total: 5,241
- Time zone: UTC+0 (GMT)

Moulay Bouazza is a town in Khénifra Province, Béni Mellal-Khénifra, Morocco. According to the 2004 census it has a population of 5,241.

The town was named after a famous religious leader of the 12th-century called Abu Yaaza.
