= Ain al-Kheil Mosque =

Mosque in Fez, Morocco

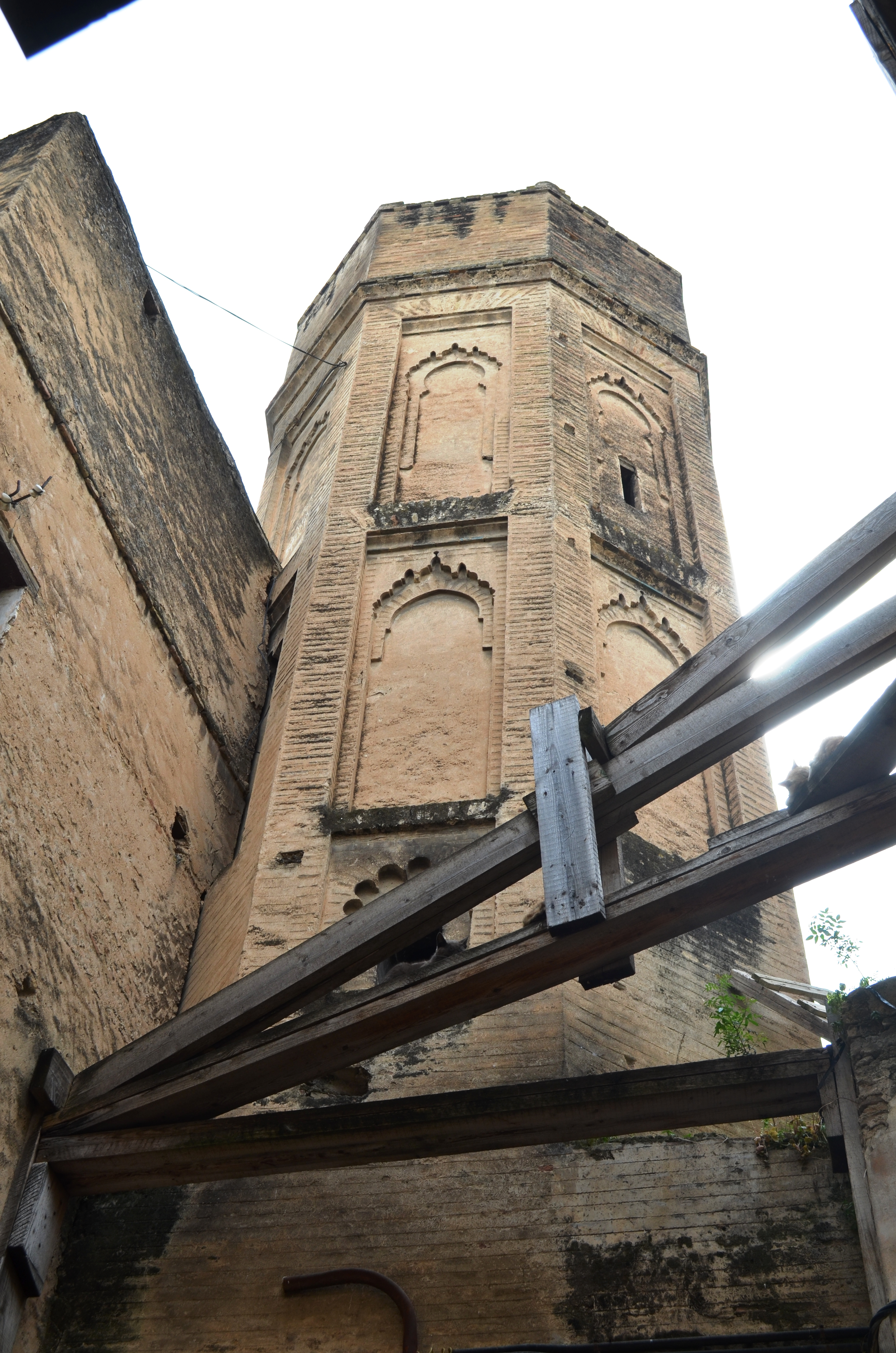

Religion
- Affiliation: Islam

Location
- Location: Fes el Bali, Fez, Morocco
- Interactive map of Ain al-Kheil Mosque
- Coordinates: 34°03′56.1″N 4°58′35″W

Architecture
- Type: Mosque

The Ain al-Kheil Mosque (Arabic: مسجد عين الخيل), also known as the al-Azhar Mosque (Arabic: جامع الأزهر), (Note: Not to be confused with al-Azhar Mosque in Cairo or the nearby Lalla az-Zhar Mosque in Fes el-Jdid.) is a historic mosque in Fes el-Bali, the old medina of Fes, Morocco.

== History ==
The mosque was first built in the late 12th century during the Almohad dynasty and is located in the Ain al-Kheil ("Spring of the Horse") neighbourhood. It is notable for its association with Ibn Arabi, the Sufi master from al-Andalus, who visited Fes multiple times and would frequently retreat to this mosque for prayer and meditation in the late 1190s.

The mosque became the subject of a recent restoration and rehabilitation effort after several adjacent houses collapsed in 2006, killing 10 people and damaging part of the mosque. The restoration effort was spearheaded by the Moroccan Ministry of Endowments and Islamic Affairs in cooperation with the World Monuments Fund, aiming to highlight Ibn Arabi's association with Fes.

== Architecture ==
The mosque is unusual in two respects. One is its octagonal minaret, which is rare in Fes and in much of Morocco where minarets with a square base are standard. Its other unusual characteristic is that it has two prayer halls on two different stories. The prayer halls are nonetheless in the usual hypostyle format with rows of columns supporting horseshoe arches. The mosque also has a courtyard with a fountain, like other sahns of Moroccan mosques.
