= Abu Yaaza =

Maghrebi Sufi saint (died 1177)

Abū Yaʿazzā [or Yaʿzā] Yalannūr ibn Maynūn ibn ʿAbdallāh Dukkālī Hazmīrī al-Gharbī (d. 1 Shawwal 572/2 April 1177) (also Bouazza) was a 12th-century Maghrebi Sufi Saint.

== Early life and career ==
Abū Yaʿazzā was from a sub-Atlantic Berber tribe. He was a student of Abu Shuayb and the teacher of Abu Madyan. Abu al-Abbas al-Azafi wrote his biography: Diʿāmat al-yaqīn fī zaʿāmat al-muttaqīn (The Pillar of certainty in the leadership of the God-conscious). His grave and mosque was renovated in 1691 by Sultan Moulay Ismael. A yearly moussem is celebrated in his honour.

He mausoleum is located in the eponymous town of Moulay Bouazza.
