= Abu Abdallah ibn Harzihim =

Abu Abd Allah ibn Muhammad ibn Harazim (Arabic: عبدالله بن محمد بن حرزهم; d. 1236) from Fez was a Moroccan Sufi leader, pupil of Abu Madyan. Ibn Harazim was the sheikh of Abu-l-Hassan ash-Shadhili, the eponymous founder of the Shadhili tariqat.
