= Eric Winkel =

Islamic scholar focusing on Ibn 'Arabi teaching

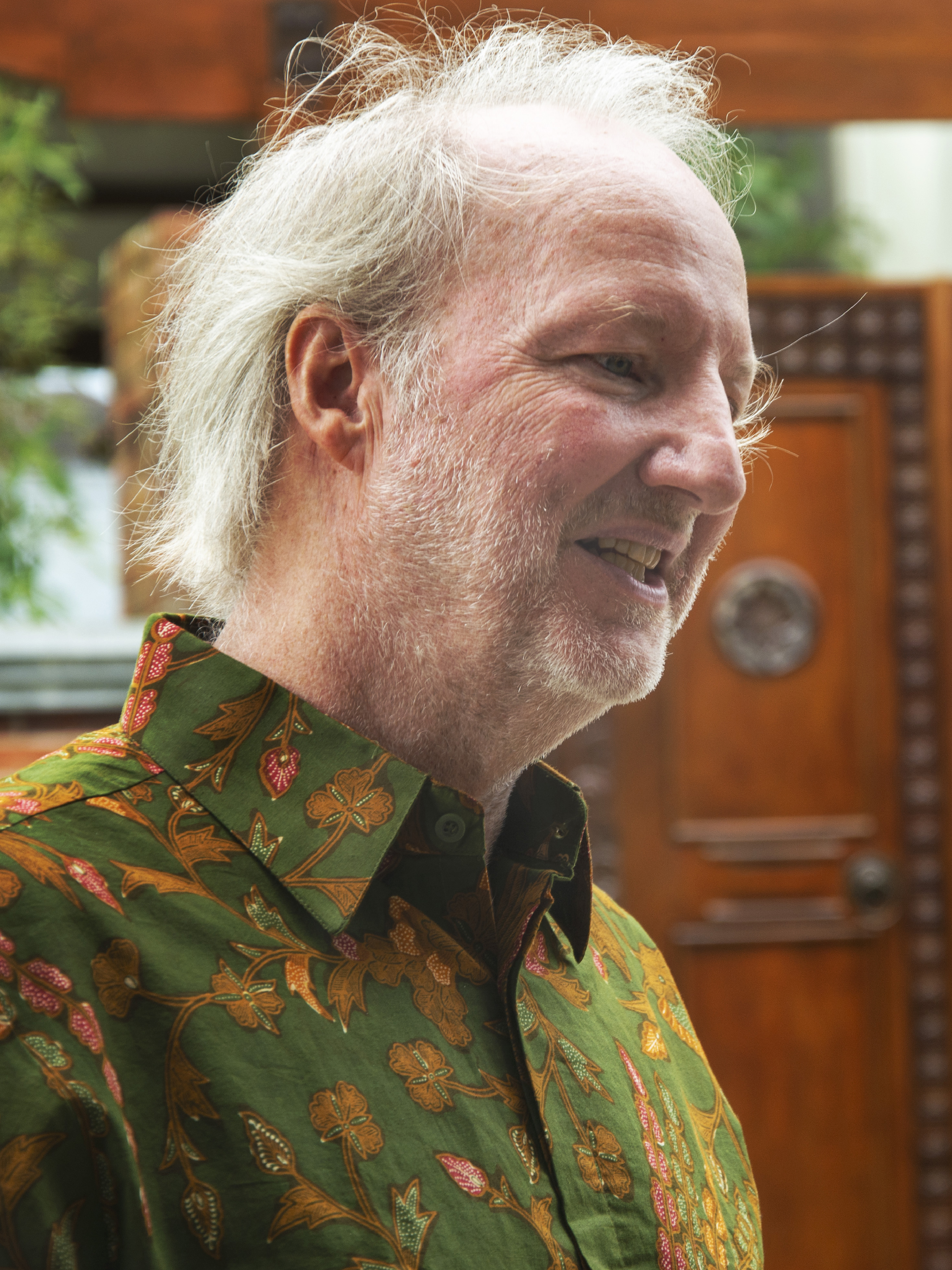
- Eric Winkel in Bandung, Indonesia (2022)
- Born: Manhattan, Kansas, United States
- Other names: Shuayb
- Occupation(s): writer, translator
- Notable work: The Openings Revealed in Makkah (translation of Futuhat al-Makiyah)

Eric Alexander Winkel is an Islamic scholar focusing on Ibn 'Arabi's teaching. He studied the Futuhat al-Makiyya for over 33 years. During his tenure as senior research fellow at the International Institute of Advanced Islamic Studies (IAIS) in Malaysia, he started to explore correlations between Islam and modern sciences and laid the groundwork for the connections between Ibn 'Arabi's vision and new directions in physics and mathematics. Since then, he has dedicated his life to the translation of the monumental Futūḥāt al-Makkīyah (The Openings Revealed in Makkah) into English.

== Biography ==
Born in Manhattan, Kansas, United States., Winkel's family moved to Switzerland around the age of twelve. For grades 7-11, Winkel attended the International School of Geneva, Switzerland. After moving back to America in 1979, he then attended the Freshman Honors Program at the University of Delaware for a year, before gaining a B.A. in Religion from Haverford College, Pennsylvania in 1982. In 1985, he received his Master's degree in South Asian Studies from University of Pennsylvania, Philadelphia. In 1988, he subsequently earned his PhD in Government and International Studies from the University of South Carolina.

The encounter with Ibn ʿArabī occurred from young age when Winkel read Ralph Austen's Sufis of Andalusia, and at the age of 17 years old he proceeded to delve into Ibn al-ʿArabī’s works as much as he could. His doctoral thesis, titled "The Ontological Status of Politics in Islam and The Epistemology of Islamic Revival", later became his monograph, Islam and the Living Law: The Ibn al-'Arabi Approach.

Since 2012 he started the Futuhat Project, the first-ever complete translation and commentary of the Futūḥāt al-Makkīyah into English, titled "The Openings Revealed in Makkah". Futūḥāt al-Makkīyah is a magnum opus of over 10,000 pages written by 12th century Sufi master Ibn al-ʿArabī; and currently (end of 2022) there are 4 volumes of the English translation out of the planned 19 volumes, published by Pir Press in New York. During Covid (2020–2022), Dr. Winkel held weekly sessions on Ibn al-ʿArabī and the Futūḥāt which were recorded and released on YouTube. The series of lectures can be found on YouTube as "Insights from (Muhyiddin) Ibn Arabi". More than 100 hours of public engagement inspired the publication of "An Illustrated Guide to Ibn Arabi" in 2022.

== Work and career ==
- 2012–present: Community scholar, working full-time on the "Futuhat Project".
- 2012–2012: Senior Fulbright Scholar at Institut Agama Islam Negeri Sumatera Utara, Medan, Indonesia
- 2010–2012: Senior Research Fellow at the Institute of Advanced Islamic Studies (IAIS), Kuala Lumpur, Malaysia
- 2008–2009: Foreign Faculty Member at National College of Arts Lahore, Pakistan

== Publications ==
- The Openings Revealed in Makkah (4 volumes, translator and commentator), Pir Press, New York, 2020–2022.
- An Illustrated Guide to Ibn Arabi, Pir Press, New York, 2022.
- Envisioning the Future: An Islamic Perspective of Visions of the Future, Kuala Lumpur, 2011.
- Educational Philosophy in Malaysia. Monograph, University of Malaya, 2006.
- Damascus Steel (a novel). CAR&D, 2001.
- Islam and the Living Law: The Ibn al-'Arabi Approach. Karachi: Oxford University Press, 1997.
- Mysteries of Purity: Ibn al-'Arabi's Asrar al-Taharah (a translation of a section of the Futūḥāt al-Makkīyah), Notre Dame: Cross-Cultural Publications, 1995.
