= Abu al-Abbas al-Azafi =

Maghrebi religious and legal scholar and judge (1162–1236)

Personal life
- Born: Abu al-Abbas Ahmad abu Abdallah Muhammad ibn Ahmad al-Lakhmi al-Sabti; 1162 Ceuta, modern-day Spain
- Died: 1236 (aged 73–74) Ceuta, modern-day Spain
- Notable work(s): Kitab ad-durr al-munazzam fi i ‘l-mawlid al-mu’azzam
- Occupation: Religious and Legal Scholar

Religious life
- Religion: Islam

Abū 'l-ʿAbbās al-ʿAzafī (Arabic: أبو العباس أحمد العَزَفي السبتي) or in full Abū al-ʿAbbās Aḥmad Abū ʿAbdallāh Muḥammad ibn Aḥmad al-Lakhmī al-Sabtī (1162–1236), known also simply as Ibn ʿAzafa, was a religious and legal scholar and member of the Banu al-Azafi who ruled Ceuta in the 13th century. Al-Azafi was an expert in the analysis of oral tradition (riwāya wa-dirāya). He wrote a biography of the Berber saint Abu Yaaza (d. 1177): Diʿāmat al-yaqīn fī zaʿāmat al-muttaqīn (The Pillar of certainty in the leadership of the God-conscious).

His most important work is Pearls of Verses on the Birth of the Exalted Prophet (Kitāb al-durr al-munaẓẓam fī’l-mawlid al-nabī al-muʿaẓẓam). It was completed, after his death, by his son Abu l’Qasim. Al-Azafi established the custom of celebrating Mawlid in Ceuta. His son Abu'l-Qasim propagated it throughout the Maghreb.
