= Ibn al-Zayyat al-Tadili =

13th-century Moroccan Sufi writer

Abu Yaqub Yusuf Ibn Yahya ibn al-Zayyat al-Tadili (Arabic: ابن الزيات التادلي) (born in Beni Mellal, died 1229/30) was a Sufi mystic, influential jurist and hagiographer from Morocco. He is the biographer of many Sufi saints. His best known publication is the at-Tashawwuf ila rijal at-tasawwuf (Looking upon the men of Sufism), ed. Ahmed Tawfiq (Rabat: Faculte des Lettres et des Sciences Humaines 1984). It was written ca. 1220. At-Tadili also wrote the hagiography of Abu al-Abbas as-Sabti entitled Akhbar Abi'l-Abbas as-Sabti. Like his Al-tashawwuf (e.g. on Abu Madyan) it contains many autobiographical passages of Abu al-Abbas himself.
