= Dhawq =

Term in Sufism

Dhawq (Arabic: ذوق, "taste") is a concept in Sufi mysticism that refers to the direct, inner experience of spiritual reality. While the term appears in the Qur’an and Hadith with various meanings, including punishment and faith, it evolved within Sufism into a central epistemological concept denoting intuitive, experiential knowledge of the divine. In Sufism, dhawq is a direct, first-hand experience. It refers, principally, to the Gnosis of God which is achieved experientially, as a result of rigorous empiric spiritual wayfaring. It plays an important role in the epistemology of Al-Ghazzali, and is often expressed, to some extent, in teleological statements scattered throughout his works.

== Etymology and early usage ==
In Arabic, dhawq is the verbal noun (maṣdar) of dhāqa, meaning “to taste” in both literal and figurative senses. The related term ṭaʿm is often used alongside it, but more specifically refers to the flavor or taste of something itself. The classical writer al-Jāḥiẓ records examples of dhāqa being used figuratively, especially in early Arabic poetry. Ibn Manẓūr likewise notes occurrences in the Qur’an and Hadith where the verb expresses the act of “feeling” or “experiencing.”

== Qur’an and Sunna ==
Dhāqa is used once in the Qur’an to refer to Adam and Eve: “they tasted of the tree” (7:22). This, however, still holds a figurative meaning, as the tree itself is of the knowledge of good and evil according to the Bible. Dhāqa is used significantly in the Qur’an as a metaphor. It is used in a very negative connotation as the damned are said to “taste” their punishment, dire future, or unhappiness in many passages. Additionally, it is said that man tastes “minor punishment” in reference to worldly trials, to allow him to repent and avoid tasting the “major punishments” of the afterlife.

In the Sunna, taste has a positive connotation. It is used to refer to receiving the fruits and benefits of faith. Prophetic traditions speak of believers “tasting” the sweetness of faith.

== Dhawq in Sufi thought ==
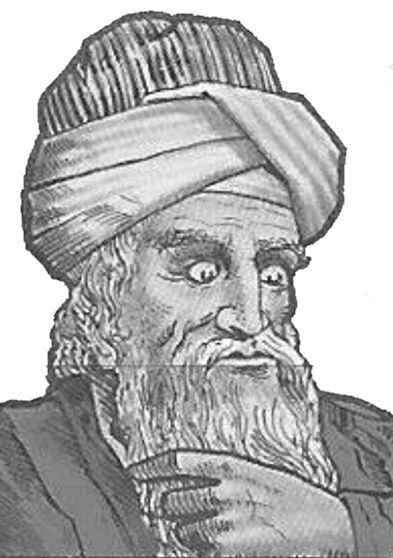
Portrait of al-Jahiz

Within Sufi mysticism, dhawq evolved to refer to the direct, inner experience of the divine—an intuitive knowledge that transcends intellectual understanding and expresses a deeply personal encounter with spiritual reality. Within Sufism, dhawq, or “taste”, is not something that can be merely understood intellectually; it must be experienced within the depth of one’s being. Reflecting how the Qur’an uses the term to describe lived experiences such as punishment or reward, Sufis adopted it to express spiritual states like awe, divine love, or the annihilation of the self.

== Foundational interpretations ==
Dhū l-Nūn al-Miṣrī believed that one who truly longs for God will "taste a drink" that only intensifies that longing. This idea is echoed in the work of the Sufi scholar al-Ḥākim al-Tirmidhī, who describes spiritual desire as both painful and sweet, offering a foretaste of union with the Divine.

Dhawq is closely associated with wajd, the ecstatic experience of encountering the divine, and is often considered the first stage in that process. The Sufi mystic Aḥmad b. ʿAṭāʾ al-Rūdhabārī defined dhawq as the initial experience of being (mawājid). According to him, some mystics lose consciousness under the intensity of this experience (referred to as the people of absence), while others remain aware and present (people of presence).

The Sufi theorist al-Sarrāj also identified dhawq as a preliminary phase that precedes shurb (drinking) and rayy (being spiritually filled).

== Dhawq and samāʿ ==
Beyond this technical usage, dhawq also appears in the context of samāʿ (spiritual audition), where it describes the ineffable emotional states provoked by music and ritual. In the anonymous 10th-century treatise Adab al-mulūk fī bayān ḥaqāʾiq al-taṣawwuf, dhawq is presented as a means of accessing the inner truths of samāʿ, encompassing both the experience of being and the realities revealed through divine contemplation.

Listening to spiritual music (samāʿ) can evoke such states, often leading to profound and indescribable experiences of the soul.

== Stages of Spiritual Experience ==
Several Sufi scholars, including al-Qushayrī and al-Sarrāj, described dhawq (taste), shurb (drinking), and rayy (satiation) as progressive stages of spiritual experience. These terms are often linked to the states of spiritual intoxication (sukr) and sobriety (ṣaḥw), with each phase representing a deeper level of divine understanding. Dhawq marks the initial glimpse of spiritual truth, shurb indicates deeper immersion, and rayy reflects complete absorption in the experience.

== Dhawq as epistemology ==
In later Sufi thought, dhawq was developed into a formal term within Sufi epistemology. Ibn Ṭāhir associated it with spiritual knowledge that transcends traditional jurisprudence, distinguishing between inner, experiential knowledge (dhawqī) and externally transmitted knowledge (naqlī). Similarly, al-Qāshānī defined dhawq as the initial stage of divine contemplation, linking it to brief instances of theophanic presence.

According to al-Qushayrī and Ibn ʿArabī, dhawq is closely linked to tajallī, or divine self-disclosure. It is considered the “fruit” of moments of revelation and spiritual inspiration (wāridāt), and as such, represents a form of immersive knowledge that arises from a direct relationship with the divine. In this context, taste is not only emotional but also cognitive, serving as a way to receive divine knowledge beyond conventional forms of learning.

Sufi thinkers such as Najm al-Dīn Kubrā and ʿAbd al-Razzāq al-Qāshānī emphasized that dhawq provides a form of insight that cannot be attained through intellect alone. Rather than acquiring knowledge through books or rational thought, the mystic “tastes” it directly through spiritual experience. This mode of knowing is especially significant in the context of the “science of spiritual states”, which involves levels of understanding that surpass the capacity of reason.

== Dhawq and emotional states ==
Within Sufism, dhawq can also refer to a range of emotional states, including joy, longing, and affliction. Al-Hujwīrī distinguishes between dhawq and shurb, noting that while shurb offers spiritual contentment, dhawq may involve both bliss and pain.

Scholars such as Aḥmad Zarrūq and al-Jāmī acknowledged that while dhawq can affirm spiritual truth, it may also be influenced by factors such as passion or self-deception. As a result, they emphasized the importance of distinguishing authentic taste from fleeting or misleading emotional states. For dhawq to be considered valid, it must be grounded in spiritual integrity and verified through the stability of one’s inner condition.

== In Sufi poetry ==
In Sufi poetry, dhawq often serves as a metaphor for divine love. Prominent figures such as al-Muhājī and al-Ḥallāj describe it as a deeply personal experience in which the lover is united with the Beloved. The “taste” of love is portrayed as a powerful force that transcends reason, drawing the seeker into an intimate relationship with God.

== Definitions in Sufi literature ==
Sufi encyclopedias and Islamic dictionaries define dhawq in both spiritual and philosophical terms. Al-Jurjānī described it as a divine light projected into the hearts of the saints, enabling them to recognize truth without the need for intermediaries. Al-Tahānawī interpreted dhawq as a spiritual drink offered to those who love God, echoing earlier definitions provided by al-Qāshānī.
