= Abu Madyan =

Andalusian Sufi teacher (1126–1198)

Sidi Abu Madyan أبو مدين
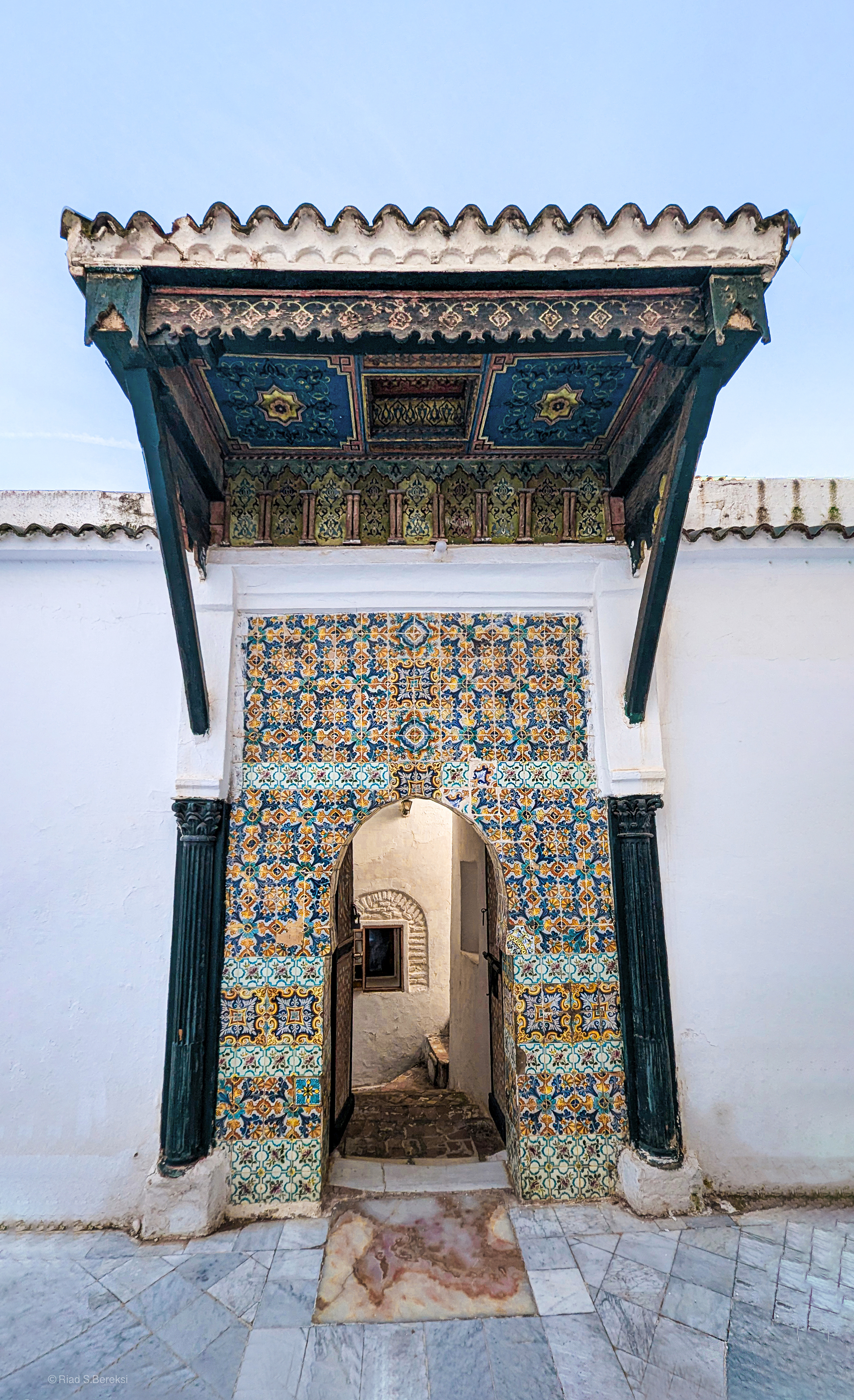
- Entrance to the Abu Madyan Tomb in Tlemcen
- Title: al-Ghawth (The succour) الغوث

Personal life
- Born: Shu'ayb ibn al-Hussein شعيب أبو مدين; 1126 Cantillana, Seville, al-Andalus, Almoravid empire
- Died: 1198 (aged 71–72) near the river of Ysser, outskirts of Tlemcen, Almohad empire
- Resting place: Sidi Boumediene Mausoleum
- Notable work(s): Bidayt al-Muridin (بداية المريدين); Uns al-Wahid (أنس الوحيد); Tuhfat al-Arib (تحفة الأريب) poetry collection
- Education: Córdoba al-Qarawiyyin; Béjaïa

Religious life
- Religion: Islam
- Denomination: Sunni
- Jurisprudence: Maliki
- Tariqa: Qadiriyya
- Creed: Ash'ari

Muslim leader
- Disciple of: Sidi Harazem
- Influenced by: Sidi Harazem Abdul-Qadir Gilani Al-Ghazali Abu Yaaza
- Influenced: Ibn Arabi Abu Mohamed Salih Abu Said al-Baji Abdasalam Ibn Mashish Abu Abdallah ibn Harzihim

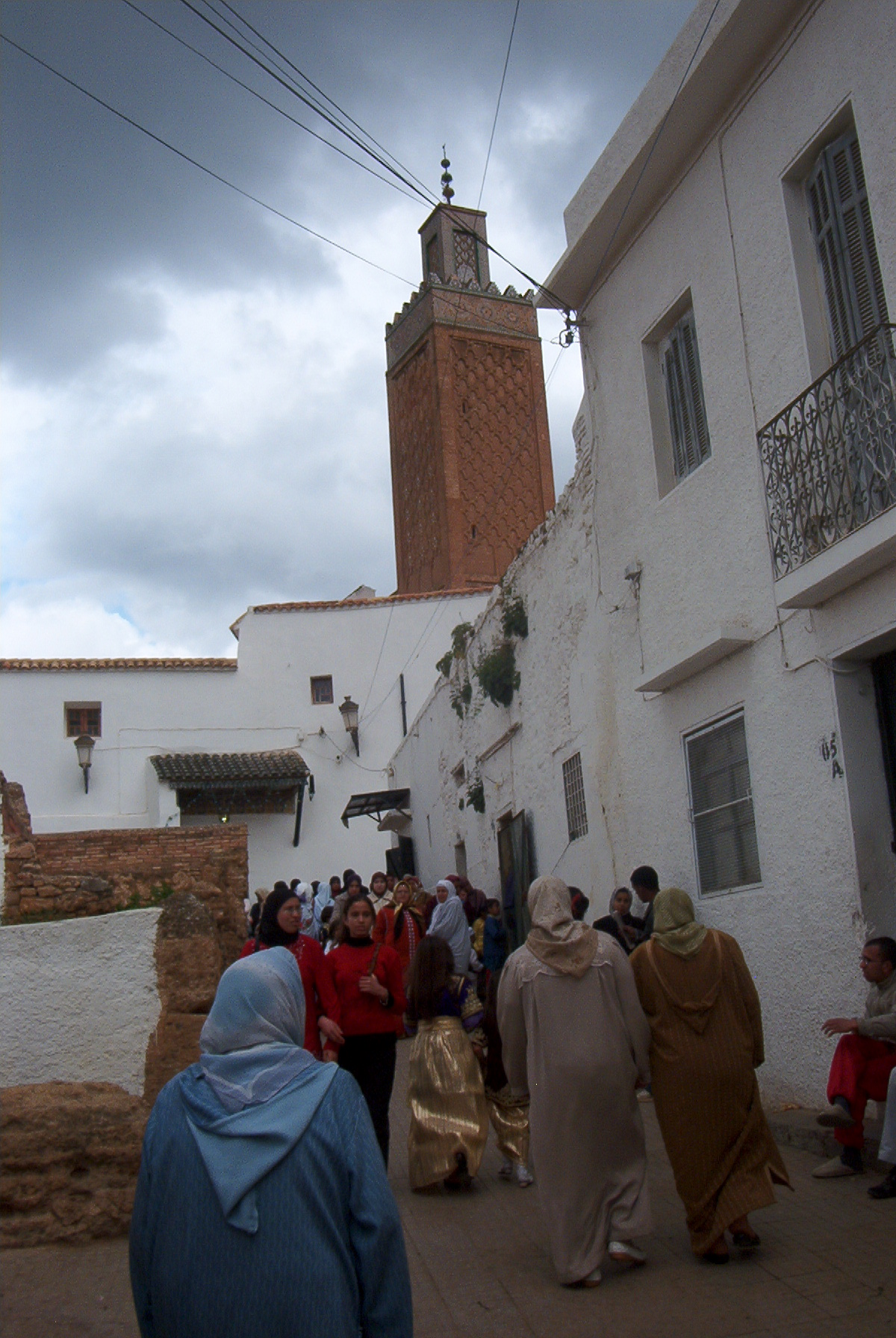
Visiting the tomb of Sidi Boumediène in El Eubbad district, in Tlemcen, Algeria, on day of Mawlid.

Abu Madyan Shuʿayb ibn al-Husayn al-Ansari al-Andalusi (Arabic: ابو مدين شعيب بن الحسين الأنصاري الأندلسي; c. 1126–1198 CE; AH 520–594), commonly known as Abū Madyan, was an influential Andalusian Sufi mystic, poet, teacher, and spiritual adept, and one of the major early masters of Sufism in the Maghreb. He has even been described as a national figure of Maghrebi mysticism because of his formative role in the development of Sufism in the region. His religious teaching emphasized fervent devotion to God, introspection, and the harmonization of inner spiritual states with external religious observances through asceticism.

Born in Spain into a poor family, Abu Madyan travelled to Morocco to learn weaving as a trade. He subsequently travelled in search of spiritual teachers, among them ʿAbd al-Qādir al-Jīlānī, before settling in Bijayah (Bougie) in Algeria, where a circle of disciples gathered around him. Among his most famous students were Ibn 'Arabi (d. 637/1240) and the historian Ibn Hammad (d. 628/1230).

Abu Madyan came to be recognized as the qutb al-Ghawth, "the axis on whom the mystical support of the world turns", and has continued to be regarded as the spiritual guardian of Algeria.

== Life ==
Abu Madyan was born in Cantillana, a small town about 35 km away from Seville, in 1126. He came from an obscure family and his parents were poor. As he grew up, he learned the trade of a weaver as it was a popular practice at the time. His insatiable hunger for knowledge, however, piqued his interest in the Qur'an and the study of religion and mysticism. After crossing the Strait of Gibraltar, he worked for a while in Sabta (Ceuta) with fishermen. Afterwards, he went to Marrakesh, where he served in the Almoravid army defending the city.

Soon after, Abu Madyan traveled to Fez to complete his education. He left for Fez at about the end of the Almoravid era or at the beginning of the founding of the Almohad state. There, he studied under Abu Ya’azza al-Hazmiri, ‘Ali Hirzihim, and al-Dakkak. It was al-Dakkak that provided him with the khirka, the cloak passed from Master to student in the study of Sufism. Abu Madyan was particularly fascinated with mysticism by Sidi Ali Ibn Harazem. After finishing his studies with his master Abu Ya'za, he traveled to the Orient. During his time in the Orient, he became familiar with the works of Al-Ghazali, one of the most prominent theologians, philosophers, and mystics of Sunni Islam regarded as one of the renewers of the religion.

Abu Madyan went to Mecca where he met the great Muslim saint, Jilani, and completed his spiritual training under him. On his return, he went to the town of Béjaïa where he practiced very strict asceticism and acquired an honorable reputation for his knowledge. People would come far to both listen to his public lectures and consult him on certain manners. People believed he could even perform miracles.

His beliefs were in opposition to the Almohade doctors of that town. The Almohads were disturbed at his increasing reputation and wanted to get rid of him.

Eventually, Madyan settled in the town of Béjaïa where he established a mosque-school (zawiya). The sheer amount of fame and influence that Abu Madyan evoked raised serious concern from the political powers of the time. The Almohad Caliph Ya’qub al-Mansur summoned Abu Madyan to Marrakesh for this reason so he could talk to Abu Madyan himself. Upon his summoning to Marrakesh, Abu Madyan was taken ill and died before he reached his destination in 594/1198, near the river of Ysser (يسر). His last sigh was supposedly "Allah al-Haqq." He was buried in al-‘Ubbad near Tlemcen, Algeria. His funeral was widely commemorated by the people of Tlemcen and he has been considered the patron saint and protector of Tlemcen ever since. A mausoleum was built by the order of the Almohade sovereign, Muhammad al-Nasir, too shortly after his death. Many princes and kings of Tlemcen have contributed to this mausoleum since his demise. Many monuments, a good number of them still well preserved, were built in his honor next to his tomb by the Marinid kings, who controlled Tlemcen in the 14th century. One such monument is the Mosque of Madrasa. His tomb became the center of fine architecture and is still a place of pilgrimage for many Sufis today.

== Teachings ==
The basic principles and virtues taught at Madyan’s school in Bejaia were repentance (tawba), asceticism (zuhd), paying visits to other masters, and service to experienced masters. He emphasized futuwa (youth/chivalry) but only when accompanied by the obedience of devotees to their master, the avoidance of disagreements between devotees, justice, constancy, nobility of mind, the denunciation of the unjust, and a feeling of satisfaction with the gifts of God. Because of his focus on the acceptance of one’s emotions, Madyan and his followers refused to confine themselves to only asceticism and meditation alone, but instead lived day to day by maintaining close relationships with the people around them. Along with sharing his knowledge and ideas with his disciples, Abu Madyan wrote many poems and spoke in proverbs in order to connect with the masses and not just the intellectuals.

According to Yahya ibn Khaldun, Abu Madyan's teachings may all be summed up in this verse which he often repeated, "Say Allah! and abandon all that is matter, or is connected with it, if though desirest to attain the truth goal."

== Legacy ==
Aside from attaining Ghawth status and teaching hundreds and hundreds of disciples, Abu Madyan left his mark in more ways than one. He gained immense popularity because he was relatable, despite his high scholarly status. He had a personality and way of speaking that united people from all walks of life, from the common people to the academics. Even to this day, scholars say that no one of the time surpassed him in religious and intellectual influence. His school produced hundreds of saints and out of the 46 Sufi saints in the Rif region, 15 were his disciples. People still visit his tomb today for asking God through him, which is called tawassul, they visit him from all around the world.

== Sayings ==
There are very few surviving writings from Abu Madyan, and of those that do still exist, there are mystical poems, a testament (wasiyya) and a creed (aqida). He encouraged the free expression of emotions rather than rigidity, but also made known his support of asceticism complete devotion to God and a minimalist lifestyle.

== Works ==
- Bidayat al Mouridin, Ms 938, Bibliot. Nat. Alger.
- Diwan, (collection of his poems) édit. Chaouar of Tlemcen, Damascus, 1938.
- Ouns al Wahid, Ms 2-105 (8) fol. 337–343, Bibliot. Nat. Paris, ed. in Cairo 1301–1884, with a commentary by Ahmed Bâ'chan.
- Tahfat al Arib, pub. et trad. in Latin par F. de Dombay, Vindobonae, Ebn Médirai Mauri Fessani Sentenciae quaedam arabicae, 1805
- The Way of Abu Madyan, bilingual collection, Islamic Texts Society, Cambridge, 1996. Transl by Vincent Cornell.
- Adab al-Murid, A poem on the etiquette of the murid for beginners on the spiritual path of suluk.

== Sources ==
- Arnaldez, R. "Falsafa". Encyclopaedia of Islam, Second Edition. Edited by: P. Bearman;, Th. Bianquis; C.E. Bosworth;, E. van Donzel; and W.P. Heinrichs. Brill, 2011. Brill Online Augustana. 5 April 2011
- Zarcone, Th.; Hunwick, J.O.; Ernst, C.; Jong, F. de;, L. Massignon-[B. Radtke]; Aubin, Françoise. "Taṣawwuf (a."). Encyclopaedia of Islam, Second Edition. Edited by: P. Bearman;, Th. Bianquis;, C.E. Bosworth;, E. van Donzel; and W.P. Heinrichs. Brill, 2011. Brill Online. Augustana. 5 April 2011
- Griffel, Frank, "Al-Ghazali", The Stanford Encyclopedia of Philosophy (Fall 2008), Edward N. Zalta (ed.),
- Marçais, G. "Abū Madyan, S̲h̲uʿayb b. al-Ḥusayn al-Andalusī". Encyclopaedia of Islam, Second Edition. Edited by: P. Bearman;, Th. Bianquis;, C.E. Bosworth;, E. van Donzel; and W.P. Heinrichs. Brill, 2011. Brill Online. Augustana. 3 April 2011
