= Cantillana =

- town
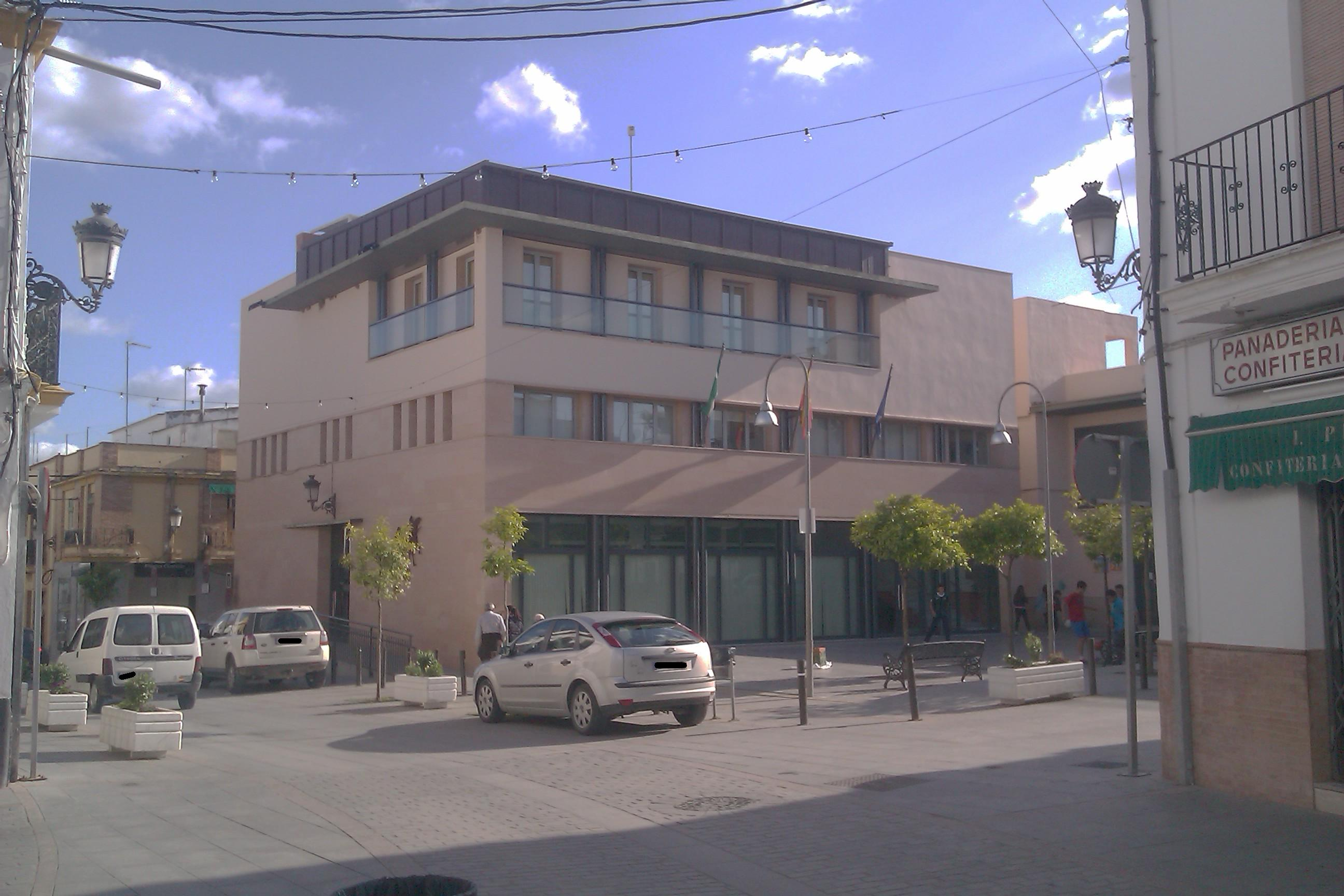
- Town hall

- Flag Coat of arms

- Location in Spain. Cantillana (Andalusia) Cantillana (Spain)
- Coordinates: 37°36′N 5°49′W
- Country: Spain
- Autonomous community: Andalusia
- Province: Seville
- Comarca: Vega del Guadalquivir

Government
  - Mayor: José Eduardo Reina Hidalgo

Area
  - Total: 107.70 km^{2} (41.58 sq mi)
- Elevation: 34 m (112 ft)

Population (2025-01-01)
  - Total: 10,780
  - Density: 100.1/km^{2} (259.2/sq mi)
- Demonym: Cantillaneros
- Time zone: UTC+1 (CET)
  - Summer (DST): UTC+2 (CEST)
- Website: Official website

Cantillana (Arabic: قطنيانة) is a town located in the province of Seville, Andalusia, southern Spain. It was the birthplace of Sufi mystic Abu Madyan.

Energy

Solar: 3.78 MW h solar farm (bannered by Prodiel.com) on the train station side of the Guadalquivir river, facing an electric substation served by delegates of Elecnor, Endesa, Imesa, Ingersol and Cabelte.

Petrochemical: Repsol fuel stations mark Cantillana (24/7) and neighbouring Cantillana la Montana.

Roman Mosaic

Excavated approximately 1.8 metres below the current residential surface, near the Church of Asuncion. The mosaic features a full image of sea creatures surrounding a mosaiced water well.

== See also ==
- List of municipalities in Seville

== Notable people from Cantillana ==
- Abu Madyan
- José Pérez Ocaña
