= Maryamiyya Order =

Sufi order

The Maryamiyya Order is a tariqa or Sufi order founded by Sheikh Isa Nur ad-Din–Frithjof Schuon (1907–1998). It is a branch of the Shadhiliyya–Darqawiyya–Alawiyya order, with communities in Europe, the Americas and the Islamic world. Its doctrine is based on what it understands to be the universal truths of pure esoterism, and its method conforms to the essential elements of the Sufi path.

== Founding ==
Frithjof Schuon was born in Basel, Switzerland, in 1907. Raised as a Protestant before becoming a Catholic at the age of 14, he was sensitive from an early age to diverse expressions of the sacred. His father passed on to him not only an admiration for Eastern wisdoms, Islam and the North American Indians, but also a love of the Virgin Mary.

He was 16 when he discovered the writings of René Guénon. These confirmed and helped to structure his own convictions. In 1931, he began to correspond with Guénon, who advised him to turn to Islam and Sufism. At the end of 1932, Schuon traveled to Mostaganem, Algeria, where he entered Islam, receiving the name Isa. He spent nearly four months in the zawiya of Sheikh Ahmad al-Alawi, who initiated him into Sufism and gave to him the additional name of Nur ad-Din.

Three years later, he returned to Mostaganem where, he reports, Sheikh Adda Ben Tounes, successor to Sheikh al-Alawi, conferred upon him the function of muqaddam, authorizing him to initiate aspirants into the Alawi order. Returning to Europe, he established zawiyas in Switzerland and France, composed mostly of fellow readers of Guénon. At the end of 1936, Schuon awoke one morning with the certainty of having been invested with the function of spiritual master or Sufi sheikh. Several of those close to him reported dreams they had experienced the same night, confirming this new function. As each Sufi sheikh is independent, Schuon's group became an autonomous branch of the Tariqa Alawiyya.

== Doctrine and method ==
Every spiritual path comprises a doctrine and a method. Those of the Maryamiyya Order may be summed up in two words: religio perennis (perennial religion). This religio is neither a religion among others, nor a religion superior to others, rather it constitutes the timeless, primordial and universal essence of all religions; it is quintessential esoterism, both doctrinal and methodical. The Maryamiyya's doctrine is thus based on pure metaphysics–above all, discernment between the absolute Principle and its manifestation. Its method for spiritual realization is based essentially upon prayer, especially invocatory prayer accompanied by meditation, and the practice of virtue. (Note: "The essential function of human intelligence is discernment between the Real and the illusory or between the Permanent and the impermanent, and the essential function of the will is attachment to the Permanent or the Real. This discernment and this attachment are the quintessence of all spirituality; carried to their highest level or reduced to their purest substance, they constitute the underlying universality in every great spiritual patrimony of humanity, or what may be called the religio perennis; this is the religion to which the sages adhere, one which is always and necessarily founded upon formal elements of divine institution.") However, according to Schuon, this realization cannot be actualized independently of a revealed religion. While all religions provide this possibility, Schuon considers that "Islam possesses an essentiality, simplicity, and universality that renders it particularly apt to convey a direct manifestation of the Religio perennis."

More specifically, the Maryami spiritual method is based on the central practices of Sufism, starting with the ritual prayer (salah), the invocation of the Divine Name (dhikr Allah) and the individual retreat (khalwa). Originally for the benefit of his Western disciples, Schuon focused on the essential and obligatory elements of Islamic law (sharia). He did so in part because he considered the full observance of the sharia by Westerners in the West to be unrealistic and also because, in line with other Sufi masters, he wanted the emphasis placed on the invocation of the Divine Name rather than on the accumulation of meritorious practices. (Note: "A man asked the Prophet Muhammad, 'O Messenger of God, the prescriptions of the sharia are too many for me, so teach me one thing to which I can firmly cling!' The Prophet replied, 'Let your tongue always be moist with the invocation (dhikr) of God (Allah)'." - Al-Hakim al-Nishapuri, authenticated hadith N° 1822 in Les enseignements spirituels du Prophète, T. Chouiref, Wattrelos (France): Tasnîm, 2021, p. 197.) Some of the modalities of this relaxation aroused opposition within and outside of the order.

Schuon expounds his perennialist philosophy in some twenty books, in which he highlights such essential necessities as prayer, virtue and beauty, along with the awareness of the maladies of modernism, which he contrasts with the traditional, God-centered mentality. "What distinguishes us above all–he says–from Muslims by birth or conversion–'psychologically' one might say–is that our mind is centered a priori on universal metaphysics (Advaita Vedanta, Shahadah, Risalat El-Ahadiyah (Note: "The Epistle of the Unity", a treatise traditionally attributed to Muḥyi-d-Dīn ibn ‘Arabī.)) and the universal way of the Divine Name (japa yoga, nembutsu, dhikr, prayer of the heart)."

== Growth ==
Schuon lived in relative anonymity. He was opposed to any proselytizing of his order, whose existence was known during his life only by word of mouth. As his writings attracted more and more seekers, communities of disciples formed in Europe, North and South America, and the Islamic world. He directed them from Lausanne, Switzerland, from 1941 to 1980, and from Bloomington, Indiana, U.S., from 1980 until his death in 1998. (Note: According to Mark Sedgwick, "Schuon’s following soon developed into the premier Traditionalist group. The majority of those Westerners whose reading of Traditionalist works inspired them to embark on a personal spiritual voyage, and who were in search of an orthodox master in a valid initiatic spiritual tradition, turned to Schuon for guidance.")

Although not directly affiliated with his Sufi order, Schuon had a number of followers from other religions, who shared the same perennialist perspective and followed the rites and invocatory practices of their own religion. Most of them adhered to Christianity, and a few to Hinduism, Judaism and Buddhism.

== Maryam ==
Schuon reported that in spring of 1965 he experienced the first of a series of visions of Mary (Maryam in Arabic), the mother of Jesus. The influence of this experience can be seen in his Arabic poetry, his paintings and his subsequent written work. He considered her to be his, as well as his order's, "spiritual protectress". In 1969, he added the name "Maryamiyya" to the denomination of his order, whose full name became Tariqa Shadhiliyya–Darqawiyya–Alawiyya–Maryamiyya. For him:

"the Virgin Mother, who–according to a symbolism common to Christianity and Islam–has suckled her children, the Prophets and sages, from the beginning and outside of time. [...] Mother of all the Prophets and matrix of all the sacred forms, she has her place of honor within Islam even while belonging a priori to Christianity; for this reason, she constitutes a kind of link between these two religions, whose common purpose is universalizing the monotheism of Israel. The Virgin Mary is not merely the embodiment of a particular mode of sanctity; she embodies sanctity as such. She is not one particular color or one particular perfume; she is colorless light and pure air. In her essence she is identified with merciful Infinitude, which–preceding all forms–overflows upon them all, embraces them all, and reintegrates them all."

== North American Indians ==
Already present in his childhood, Schuon's admiration for the Native American world continued throughout his life. He spent the summers of 1959 and 1963 with his wife in the American West, where he forged ties with several tribal chiefs. The couple was adopted into the Sioux (Lakota) tribe in 1959 and into the Crow tribe in 1987.

After emigrating to Bloomington, Indiana (U.S.) in 1980, Schuon was visited annually by Thomas Yellowtail, Crow medicine man and leader of the Crow Sun Dance. During several of these visits, Yellowtail taught Schuon and some of his followers several of his tribal dances and songs, which later led the Bloomington community to hold occasional "Indian Days".

Participating in Native American Indian dances has caused some controversy among Maryamis. Schuon clarified that these are only secular pow-wows, without any rite and thus without interference with the Sufi path. He further said that these meetings are optional and that they "are situated outside the practices of the Tariqah–they pertain, in sum, to our private life". More broadly, Schuon explained that "given that our perspective is essentialist, and therefore universalist and primordialist, it is entirely plausible that we have fraternal relationship with the world of the American Indians, which integrates Virgin Nature into religion; furthermore, it can give us–we who live in an unwholesome universe made of artificiality, ugliness, and pettiness–a refreshing breath of primordiality and grandeur."

In 1991, a former disciple accused Schuon of misconduct during an Indian Day. An investigation was launched, but the chief prosecutor concluded that "there is not a shred of evidence" and dismissed the case. The prosecutor issued an apology to Schuon, and the local press published an editorial entitled "Schuon case a travesty".

== Succession ==
In 1992, at the age of 85, Schuon retired as sheikh of the order. He did not name a single successor and announced that the muqaddam of each zawiya would become an independent khalifa (caliph); among these was Martin Lings, Sheikh Abu Bakr Siraj ad-Din. This in effect established multiple autonomous zawiyas. Schuon himself continued to lead the Bloomington community until the end of his life, and to provide advice to disciples from around the world who visited or wrote to him.

== Bibliography ==
- Aymard, Jean-Baptiste; Laude, Patrick (2004), Frithjof Schuon: Life and Teachings, Albany/NY, U.S.: State University of New York Press, p. 210, ISBN 978-079146205-8
- Burckhardt, Titus (2008), Introduction to Sufi Doctrine, Bloomington/IN, U.S.: World Wisdom Books, p. 152, ISBN 978-1-933316-50-5
- Cutsinger, James (2000), "Colorless Light and Pure Air: The Virgin in the Thought of Frithjof Schuon", Sophia, the Journal of Traditional Studies, 6 (2), Washington, D.C.: 115–194
- Dickson, William R. (2021), "René Guénon and Traditionalism", in Upal, Muhammad A.; Cusack, Carole M. (eds.), Handbook of Islamic Sects and Movements, Volume 21, Leiden, The Netherlands & Boston, U.S.: Brill, p. 12, ISBN 978-90-04-42525-5
- Fitzgerald, Michael O. (2010), Frithjof Schuon: Messenger of the Perennial Philosophy, Bloomington/IN, U.S.: World Wisdom Books, p. 256, ISBN 978-1-935493-08-2
- Laude, Patrick (1999), "Remarks on Esoterism in the works of Frithjof Schuon", Sacred Web, 4, Edmonton, Canada: 57–65
- Laude, Patrick (2020), Keys to the Beyond: Frithjof Schuon's Cross-Traditional Language of Transcendence, Albany/NY, U.S.: State University of New York Press, p. 394, ISBN 978-1438478999
- Lings, Martin (2005). A Return to the Spirit: Questions and Answers. Louisville, KY: Fons Vitae. pp. 78–79. ISBN 978-1887752749.
- Oldmeadow, Harry (2010), Frithjof Schuon and the Perennial Philosophy, Bloomington/IN, U.S.: World Wisdom Books, p. 348, ISBN 978-1-935493-09-9
- Schuon, Frithjof (2006), Light on the Ancient Worlds, Bloomington/IN, U.S.: World Wisdom Books, p. 168, ISBN 0-941532-72-0
- Schuon, Frithjof (2008), Christianity/Islam: Perspectives on Esoteric Ecumenism, Bloomington/IN, U.S.: World Wisdom Books, p. 256, ISBN 978-193331649-9
- Sedgwick, Mark (2009), Against the Modern World: Traditionalism and the Secret Intellectual History of the Twentieth Century, Oxford, U.K.: Oxford University Press, p. 369, ISBN 978-019539601-0
- Stoddart, William (2007), Remembering in a World of Forgetting, Bloomington/IN, U.S.: World Wisdom Books, p. 180, ISBN 978-1933316-46-8
