= Jean-Louis Michon =

French traditionalist scholar (1924–2013)

- Born: 13 April 1924; Nancy, France
- Died: 22 February 2013; Geneva, Switzerland
- Other name: Ali Abd al-Khaliq

Academic background
- Influences: René Guénon, Frithjof Schuon, Titus Burkhardt, Martin Lings, Seyyed Hossein Nasr

Academic work
- School or tradition: Traditionalism, Perennial Philosophy, Sufism
- Main interests: Esoterism, Sufism, Quran, Islamic culture and arts, Traditionalism, Perennial Philosophy
- Notable works: Ibn Ajiba: Two Treatises on the Oneness of Existence (Archetype, 2010); The Moroccan Sufi Ibn 'Ajiba and His Mi'raj, (Fons Vitae, 1998)

Jean-Louis Michon (13 April 1924 – 22 February 2013) was a French traditionalist and translator who specialized in Islamic art and Sufism. He worked extensively with the United Nations to preserve the cultural heritage of Morocco.

== Biography ==
Born in Nancy, France, in 1924, Michon was in college at the advent of WWII. There he began studying religion with a group of fellow students.

I understood that if I wanted to go to God and practice very serious ways, the only way [in Catholicism] was to become a monk. And I had no vocation to be a monk… So I just waited until something appeared.

Already having two diplomas, (one in law, one in English literature), he moved to Paris and enrolled in a program for political science.

This something appeared in the guise of the works of French Traditionalist René Guénon. Greatly moved by Guénon's writings, Michon felt the need to enter an initiatic tradition. Michon had a great personal affinity with Hinduism and Buddhism; particularly Zen Buddhism after reading the essays of D.T. Suzuki. He longed to travel to Japan to find a Zen master, but Japan was currently at war with his country.

One day in April 1945, I heard on the radio that a corps of French paratroopers was being trained, under US military assistance, to be sent to Japan. At once my decision was made! I signed up as a GI for the duration of the war. My intention was, as soon as I touched Japanese ground, using the few words I had collected from my readings; to set out in search of Satori. I entered the army just as one enters a convent; certain that God would not abandon me and would direct me to a Master.

After four months of training, and a few days before the date set for departure to Japan, the atomic bomb was dropped and Japan capitulated. He returned to school to take his final exams and it was there in the school library that he read in La Revue Africaine an article on the late Sufi master Sheikh Ahmad al-Alawi (who had died over a decade before). The article, entitled Mystic Modernist, mentioned that the late Sheikh had initiated several European disciples into the Sufi tradition. The next day Michon began attending prayers at the mosques, and, with the help of Michel Valsan, he converted to Islam (with the name Ali Abd al-Khaliq).

In 1946 he was offered a position in Damascus as an English teacher, which he took with an idea of furthering his studies in Islam. In 1949 he apprenticed to an architect draftsman and moved to Lausanne. There he lived for many years next door to Frithjof Schuon and his wife. In 1953 he married the ex-wife of Leo Schaya. The Crow medicine man Thomas Yellowtail later adopted both Michon and his wife into the Crow tribe. After marriage and the birth of a daughter, Solange, he began a career with a variety of United Nations agencies, first as a freelance editor and translator and finally, over a period of fifteen years (1957–1972), as a permanent senior translator for the World Health Organization in Geneva. It was also during this period that Michon obtained a PhD in Islamic studies at Paris University (Sorbonne). His thesis was on the life and works of a scholar and spiritual guide of great renown from the north of Morocco, Shaykh Ahmad Ibn 'Ajībah al-Hasanī (1747–1809), whose Autobiography (Fahrasa) and Glossary of Technical Terms of Sufism (Mi‘raj al-tashawwuf ilā haqā’iq al-tasawwuf) Michon translated from Arabic into French (1982; 1974 and 1990). Michon's French translation of the Fahrasa of Ibn 'Ajībah has been translated into English by David Streight (1999). Between 1970 and 1973 he participated to the Istituto Ticinese di Alti Studi in Lugano (Switzerland). In 2010 his edition of two treatises of Ibn Ajiba was published by Archetype, Cambridge, in a bi-lingual volume in English (translated by David Streight) and Arabic.

== Traditionalism ==
In July 1946 Michon traveled to Lausanne to be initiated by the disciple of Sheikh al-Alawi, Frithjof Schuon. In attendance was Martin Lings (with whom he became particularly close).

During Michon's first trip to Switzerland he traveled to Basel where he met two of Schuon's closest disciples (and prominent members of the Traditionalist School); Titus Burckhardt and Leo Schaya.

Over Easter in 1947 he visited Guénon at his home, meeting his wife Fatima and children.

When asked what message he would give the next generation, he replied:

"To my contemporaries, those of all the generations, I will say – prepare yourself to the encounter with God. It is He who has granted us an invaluable gift – intelligence – which man alone possesses among all created beings. Intelligence is the link with Him; it runs all our physic and bodily faculties. And if turned towards the Supreme Lord, lit by its light, it gives to any one of us the possibility to know himself better and to direct himself towards what is good for him."

== Work with the United Nations ==
From 1972 to 1980 Michon was the Chief Technical Advisor to the Moroccan government on UNESCO projects for the preservation of the cultural heritage. He was part of an effort to coordinate the rehabilitation of traditional handicrafts that were endangered by industrialization. He was also greatly involved in the preservation and restoration of the casbahs of Morocco as part of a project designed to protect the city of Fez.

== Works ==
- Ibn Ajiba: Two Treatises on the Oneness of Existence (Archetype, 2010)
- Introduction to Traditional Islam (World Wisdom, 2008)
- Sufism: Love and Wisdom (World Wisdom, 2006)
- Every Branch in Me: Essays on the Meaning of Man. (World Wisdom, 2002)
- Lights of Islam: Institutions, cultures, arts and spirituality in the Islamic city, (Lok Virsa, 2000)
- The Moroccan Sufi Ibn 'Ajiba and His Mi'raj (Fons Vitae, 1998)

He was also a contributor to the quarterly journal, Studies in Comparative Religion, which dealt with religious symbolism and the Traditionalist perspective.

== See also ==
- Frithjof Schuon
- René Guénon
- Leo Schaya
- Titus Burckhardt
- Martin Lings
- Traditionalist School
