= Titus Burckhardt =

Swiss traditionalist author (1908–1984)

- Born: 24 October 1908; Florence, Tuscany, Italy
- Died: 15 January 1984 (aged 75); Lausanne, Vaud, Switzerland

Philosophical work
- School: Perennialism; Traditionalist School
- Main interests: Alchemy; Anthropology; Esotericism; Cosmology; Islamology; Metaphysics; Sacred art
- Notable works: Sacred Art in East and West: Its Principles and Methods; Introduction to Sufi Doctrine; Chartres and the Birth of the Cathedral; Art of Islam, Language and Meaning; Siena, City of the Virgin

Titus Burckhardt (/ˈbɜːrkhɑːrt/; Swiss Standard German: [ˈbʊrkhart]; 24 October 1908 – 15 January 1984) was a Swiss writer and a leading member of the Perennialist or Traditionalist School. He was the author of numerous works on metaphysics, cosmology, anthropology, esoterism, alchemy, Sufism, symbolism and sacred art.

== Biography ==
Scion of a patrician family of Basel, Switzerland, Titus Burckhardt was the son of the sculptor Carl Burckhardt (1878–1923) and the grand-nephew of Jacob Burckhardt (1818–1897), an art historian and Renaissance specialist. His genealogical tree also includes John Lewis Burckhardt (1784–1817), the explorer who discovered the Nabatean city of Petra and the Egyptian temples of Abu Simbel. He was born in Florence, Italy, on October 24, 1908. The following year his family settled in Basel. He attended the same primary school as Frithjof Schuon, who became a lifelong friend. In 1920, his family left Basel for Ligornetto in the Swiss canton of Ticino, where his father died three years later.

Around 1927, Burckhardt began studying painting, sculpture and art history in Munich and Paris. Drawn to a traditional lifestyle that the West could not offer him, he took advantage of a break in his studies to visit Morocco (1928 or 1929), where he dedicated himself to drawing and painting. He was captivated by this sojourn, which marked the beginning of his spiritual quest. On his return, he discovered the works of the French metaphysician René Guénon, in whom "he found the key to the world that had entranced him".

In early 1933, Burckhardt returned to Morocco in search of a spiritual master. He converted to Islam and learned Arabic, enabling him to assimilate the Sufi classics in their original language. After some disappointments, his search led him to Fez, where he met Sheikh Ali al-Darqawi, the grandson and spiritual successor of Muhammad al-Arabi al-Darqawi (†1823), the reformer of the Shadhili order. He was initiated by the Sheikh and received into the Tariqa Darqawiya. In a bid to meet his material needs, he acquired a flock of sheep and pastured them in the countryside of the Middle Atlas, but this did little to improve his precarious finances. Parallel with this, he took up an apprenticeship in zellij tile-making with a master craftsman from Fez, who urged him to memorize the Alfiyya of Ibn Malik, a didactic poem of a thousand verses which sets out all the rules of Arabic grammar; Burckhardt remained ever grateful to him for this.

In early 1935, he was visited in Fez by Frithjof Schuon, who was on his way back to Europe from the zawiya of the late Sheikh al-Alawi of Mostaganem. Schuon had received initiation from this Shadhili Sheikh in 1932. Burckhardt soon realized that his predestined guide was none other than his childhood friend. Burckhardt's integration into local life made him suspect in the eyes of the French authorities, who ordered him to leave the country. Thus in the spring of 1935, he returned to Basel. This marked the beginning of his correspondence with René Guénon, as well as his affiliation with Schuon's tariqa. Schuon, who was living in France at that time, charged Burckhardt with the spiritual direction of his disciples in Basel.

From 1936 to 1938 Burckhardt studied art history and Oriental languages at the University of Basel. 1937 marked the beginning of his collaboration with the Guénonian-inspired journal Études Traditionnelles, in which he published articles on traditional art (in particular Hindu, Christian and Muslim art), alchemy, traditional cosmology and astrology, folklore and various symbolisms. Many of these articles were later collected into two volumes. (Note: • Symboles (1980), comprising "Le masque sacré", "Le symbolisme du jeu des échecs", "La Jérusalem céleste et le paradis de Vaikuntha", "Le retour d'Ulysse", "Considérations sur l'alchimie", "Les sciences traditionnelles à Fès", "Commentaire des Noms divins par l'imâm Ghazzâlî", "Du Barzakh" and "La prière d'Ibn Mashish". • Aperçus sur la connaissance sacrée (1987), comprising "Le folklore dans l'art ornemental", "Principes et méthodes de l'art traditionnel", "Généralités sur l'art musulman", "Nature de la perspective cosmologique", "Le temple, corps de l'homme divin", "La symbolique du miroir dans la mystique islamique", "De la Thora, de l'Évangile et du Coran", "Le Prototype unique" and "La danse du Soleil".) The journal also published his translations of Sufi treatises by Al-Ghazali, Ibn Arabi, Abd al-Karim al-Jili and al-Arabi al-Darqawî. In the view of the Pakistani professor Muhammed Suheyl Omar, Burckhardt is one of the few authors who has not only expounded, but also assimilated, Ibn Arabi's metaphysics, a view confirmed by the Iranian Islamologist Seyyed Hossein Nasr, who has also said that Burckhardt's opus has contributed to the West's interest in Ibn Arabi since the second half of the 20th century.

Burckhardt married in 1939. Shortly thereafter, he was appointed artistic director and director of publications by the Swiss German publishing house Urs Graf, headquartered in Olten and Basel and specializing in the reproduction of medieval illuminated manuscripts. He remained there until his retirement in 1968. His working languages were German, French, Arabic, Latin, English and Italian. He and his wife settled in Bern, halfway between Olten and Lausanne, where Schuon resided. The quality of Urs Graf's publications brought it a worldwide reputation in its domain, and in October 1950, in a private audience, Burckhardt presented Pope Pius XII (Note: Extract from a letter from Burckhardt to Schuon, October 24th, 1950: "... the Holy Father Pius XII gave the impression of a martyr, almost a cadaver resuscitated from the grave, very poor, delicate, completely noble, emanating a painfully touching goodness... His state of sanctity is evident and no longer has anything to do with the clerical and diplomatic entourage in which he moves, solitary and prudent.") with a quadrichromic facsimile in three volumes of the celebrated Book of Kells (Evangeliorum quatuor codex Cenannensis), a gospel in the Celtic tradition dating from 800 A.D., published by his company.

In 1952, Burckhardt and his wife moved to Lausanne, where he founded the French-Swiss branch of Urs Graf and created the collection Stätten des Geistes ("Cities of the Spirit") for which he wrote and illustrated three volumes: Siena, City of the Virgin, Fez, City of Islam, and Chartres and the Birth of the Cathedral. These completed the collection, which already included volumes on Mount Athos, Mount Sinai, Celtic Ireland, Constantinople and Kyoto. In 1951, 1958 and 1960 other publishing houses brought out the original editions of Burckhardt's Introduction to Sufi Doctrine, Sacred Art in East and West and Alchemy, Science of the Cosmos, Science of the Soul. Following Guénon, Coomaraswamy and Schuon, Burckhardt became identified as one of the great 20th century spokesmen of the philosophia perennis, "that 'uncreated wisdom' expressed in Platonism, the Vedanta, Sufism, Taoism and other authentic esoteric and sapiential teachings". According to the philosopher William Stoddart, Burckhardt — historian and philosopher of art, esoterist initiated in a Sufi path, metaphysician and artist — devoted his work as a writer to expounding "the different aspects of Wisdom and Tradition."

Morocco having recovered its independence in 1956, Burckhardt returned there regularly from 1960. In 1972, UNESCO, together with the Moroccan government, delegated him to Fez to take charge of the plan for restoration and rehabilitation of the medina and its religious patrimony, as well as its handcrafts. He remained there for five years, aware that the old city was probably the best preserved model of Islamic urbanism, and that once rehabilitated, Fez "could become a reference for the continuity of a traditional urban model, capable of evolution yet still conserving its intrinsic qualities." For the first two years Burkhardt, with drawing board and camera, singlehandedly made an inventory of the outstanding buildings, religious and secular, from the exterior and the interior, to evaluate their state of conservation. Over the three following years he led an interdisciplinary team tasked with establishing a master plan for the rehabilitation of the monuments and the urban fabric, including handcrafts "whose role is to create an ambiance that allows spiritual values to shine through." The "Master Plan of Urbanism for the City of Fez" was adopted and published by UNESCO in 1980.

During his mission to Fez, Burckhardt edited a general work on Islamic art, Art of Islam: Language and Meaning, at the request of the organisers of the Festival of the Islamic World (London, 1976), of which he became one of the guiding forces. He was regularly invited as a specialist on traditional art and urbanism to give lectures, in both the Orient and the West, and to host or participate in seminars. The islamologist Jean-Louis Michon, who knew him well, described his qualities as a speaker thus:

As a lecturer, he had a rare pedagogical gift. Thanks to his natural humility, he knew how to make himself accessible to the average man. Without ever erring into simplification or vulgarization, he managed to present key ideas clearly: fundamental notions that he developed from several angles with a benevolent deliberateness.... In one hour of conversation in a calm tone, punctuated by silences that had nothing hesitant about them but on the contrary facilitated reflection and assimilation, he would set forth several major topics, each illustrated by particularly striking examples.

Seyyed Hossein Nasr describes Burckhardt as the first Westerner "to seriously expound the inner meaning of Islamic art" and, according to Nasr, it is in large part due to his influence that European and American universities began offering courses on Islamic art and architecture. His capacities in this domain prompted Saudi Arabia to mandate him as adviser in the development of plans for a university campus in Mecca. In 1978 and 1979, together with the Egyptian Right Livelihood Award laureate Hassan Fathy and Jean-Louis Michon, he oversaw the office of the American architects tasked with these plans to ensure that the principles and spirit of traditional Muslim architecture were respected.

Burckhardt's empathy for Native American spirituality led him to the American West in 1979 to visit the medicine man Thomas Yellowtail; they had met in Paris in 1953 and again in Lausanne in 1954, and had maintained a deep friendship. His interest in the Native Americans was manifested in two published works: the German version of Black Elk Speaks (1955) and, eleven years later, Der wilde Westen ("The Wild West"), an illustrated compilation of quotes from famous Indian chiefs and 19th century settlers and cowboys.

In 1981, despite a debilitating neuropathy, Burckhardt went for the last time to Fez as guest of honour at the inauguration by the Director-General of UNESCO of the international campaign for the conservation of the medina.

He died in Lausanne on January 15, 1984.

== Works ==
=== Books translated into English ===
- An Introduction to Sufi Doctrine. Translated from the French by D. M. Matheson. Lahore, Pakistan: Ashraf, 1959; Wellingborough, England: Thorsons, 1976.
- Art of Islam: Language and Meaning. Translated from the French by Peter Hobson. London: Islamic Festival Trust, 1976.
- Siena, City of the Virgin. Translated from the German by Margaret Brown. Oxford, England: Oxford University Press, 1960.
- Famous Illuminated Manuscripts. Partial translation of Von wunderbaren Büchern. Olten & Lausanne, Switzerland: Urs Graf Verlag, 1964.
- Mirror of the Intellect: Essays on Traditional Science and Sacred Art. Translated by William Stoddart. Cambridge, England: Quinta Essentia, 1987; Albany/NY, USA: State University of New York Press, 1987.
- Fez, City of Islam. Translated from the German by William Stoddart. Cambridge, England: Islamic Texts Society, 1992.
- Chartres and the Birth of the Cathedral. Translated by William Stoddart. Ipswich, England: Golgonooza Press, 1995; Bloomington/IN, USA: World Wisdom Books, 1995.
- The Universality of Sacred Art. Colombo, Sri Lanka: The Sri Lanka Institute of Traditional Studies, 1999.
- Moorish Culture in Spain. Translated from the German by Alisa Jaffa and William Stoddart. Louisville/KY, USA: Fons Vitae, 1999.
- Sacred Art in East and West. Translated from the French by Lord Northbourne. Bedfont, Middlesex, England: Perennial Books, 1967; Louisville/KY, USA: Fons Vitae, 2001; Bloomington/IN, USA: World Wisdom Books, 2001.
- Alchemy, Science of the Cosmos, Science of the Soul. Translated from the German by William Stoddart. London: Stuart and Watkins, 1967; Baltimore/MD, USA: Penguin Books, 1972; Shaftesbury, Dorset, England: Element Books, 1986; Louisville/KY, USA: Fons Vitae, 2001.
- Mystical Astrology according to Ibn Arabī. Translated from the French by Bulent Rauf. Sherbourne, England: Beshara, 1977; Louisville/KY, USA: Fons Vitae, 2002.

=== Books in German not translated into English ===
- Land am Rande der Zeit. Basel, Switzerland: Urs Graf Verlag, 1941.
- Schweizer Volkskunst/Art Populaire Suisse. Basel, Switzerland: Urs Graf Verlag, 1941.
- Tessin (Das Volkserbe der Schweiz, Band I). Basel, Switzerland: Urs Graf Verlag, 1943, 1959 (enlarged edition).
- Von wunderbaren Büchern. Olten, Switzerland & Freiburg im Breisgau, Germany: Urs Graf Verlag, 1963.
- Marokko, Westlicher Orient: ein Reiseführer. Olten, Switzerland & Freiburg im Breisgau, Germany: Walter-Verlag, 1972.

==== As editor ====
- Wallis by Charles Ferdinand Ramuz. Basel, Switzerland: Urs Graf Verlag, 1956.
- Lachen und Weinen. Olten, Switzerland & Freiburg im Breisgau, Germany: Urs Graf Verlag, 1964.
- Die Jagd. Olten, Switzerland & Freiburg im Breisgau, Germany: Urs Graf Verlag, 1964.
- Der wilde Westen. Olten, Switzerland & Freiburg im Breisgau, Germany: Urs Graf Verlag, 1966.
- Scipio und Hannibal: Kampf um das Mittelmeer by Friedrich Donauer. Cover design and six illustrations by Titus Burckhardt. Olten, Switzerland & Freiburg im Breisgau, Germany: Walter-Verlag, 1939.
- Zeus und Eros: Briefe und Aufzeichnungen des Bildhauers Carl Burckhardt (1878–1923). Basel, Switzerland: Urs Graf Verlag, 1956.
- Athos, der Berg des Schweigens by Philip Sherrard. Translation by Titus Burckhardt of the English original Athos, the Mountain of Silence. Lausanne, Switzerland & Freiburg im Breisgau, Germany: Urs Graf Verlag, 1959.

=== Books in French not translated into English ===
- Symboles: recueil d'essais. Milan, Italy: Archè, 1980.
- Science moderne et sagesse traditionnelle. Milan, Italy: Archè, 1986.
- Aperçus sur la connaissance sacrée. Milan, Italy: Archè, 1987.

==== Translations from the Arabic ====
with introduction and commentaries

- Ibn Arabī, La sagesse des prophètes (Fusūs al-hikam). Paris: Albin Michel, 2008.
- Abd al-Karīm al-Jīlī, De l'homme universel (Al-insān al-kāmil). Paris: Dervy, 1975.
- Al-Arabî al-Darqāwī, Lettres d'un maître soufi. Milan, Italy: Archè, 1978.

=== Anthologies of Burckhardt’s writings ===
- Stoddart, William (ed.), The Essential Titus Burckhardt: Reflections on Sacred Art, Faiths, and Civilizations. Foreword by Seyyed Hossein Nasr. Bloomington/IN, USA: World Wisdom Books, 2003.
- Fitzgerald, Michael O. (ed.), The Foundations of Christian Art. Foreword by Keith Critchlow. Bloomington/IN, USA: World Wisdom Books, 2006; .
- Fitzgerald, Michael O. (ed.), Foundations of Oriental Art & Symbolism. Foreword by Brian Keeble. Bloomington/IN, USA: World Wisdom Books, 2009; .
- Chouiref, Tayeb (ed.), Titus Burckhardt: Le soufisme entre Orient et Occident, volume 2 (études et analyses). Wattrelos, France: Tasnîm, 2020.

== Bibliography ==
- Bianca, Stefano (2000), "Quelques souvenirs personnels de ma collaboration avec Titus Burckhardt", in Jaafar Kansoussi (ed.), Sagesse et splendeur des arts islamiques : Hommage à Titus Burckhardt (in French), Marrakesh: Al Quobba Zarqua, p. 13-20
- Borella, Jean (April–June 1984), "Rencontre d'un métaphysicien", Études Traditionnelles (in French) (484), Paris: Éditions Traditionnelles: 76–78
- Canteins, Jean (April–June 1984), "De l'auteur et de son œuvre", Études Traditionnelles (in French) (484), Paris: Éditions Traditionnelles: 63–68
- Chouiref, Tayeb (2020), Titus Burckhardt : Le soufisme entre Orient et Occident, volume 1 (biographie, souvenirs et témoignages) (in French), Wattrelos, France: Tasnîm, ISBN 979-109130027-8
- Du Pasquier, Roger (April–June 1984), "Un porte-parole de la Tradition universelle", Études Traditionnelles (in French) (484), Paris: Éditions Traditionnelles: 59–62
- Faure, Philippe (2000), "Un comparatisme au service de l'art sacré : arts islamiques et arts chrétiens médiévaux dans l'œuvre de Titus Burckhardt (1908-1984)", in Jaafar Kansoussi (ed.), Sagesse et splendeur des arts islamiques : Hommage à Titus Burckhardt (in French), Marrakesh: Al Quobba Zarqua, p. 75-92
- Fitzgerald, Michael (2000), "Titus Burckhardt : un grand ami des Indiens d'Amérique", in Jaafar Kansoussi (ed.), Sagesse et splendeur des arts islamiques : Hommage à Titus Burckhardt (in French), Marrakesh: Al Quobba Zarqua, p. 230-235 ♦ English version:"Titus Burckhardt: A Great Friend of the American Indians", Sacred Web (43), Vancouver, Summer 2019
- Kansoussi, Jaafar (2000), Sagesse et splendeur des arts islamiques : Hommage à Titus Burckhardt (in French), Marrakesh, Morocco: Al Quobba Zarqua
- Laurant, Jean-Pierre (2000), "Tradition et art sacré en Occident au début du XX^{ème} siècle : quelques compagnons de route de Titus Burckhardt", in Jaafar Kansoussi (ed.), Sagesse et splendeur des arts islamiques : Hommage à Titus Burckhardt (in French), Marrakesh: Al Quobba Zarqua, p. 31-36
- Loopuyt, Marc (2020), "Rencontres avec Sidi Ibrahîm Burckhardt", in Tayeb Chouiref (ed.), Titus Burckhardt : Le soufisme entre Orient et Occident, volume 1 (biographie, souvenirs et témoignages) (in French), Wattrelos, France: Tasnîm, p. 236-244, ISBN 979-109130027-8
- Michon, Jean-Louis (April–June 1984), "Titus Burckhardt à Fès, 1972-1977", Études Traditionnelles (in French) (484), Paris: Éditions Traditionnelles: 69–75 ♦ English translation: "Titus Burckhardt in Fes, 1972–1977", Studies in Comparative Religion, 16 (1–2), Bedfont, Middlesex, England: Perennial Books, Winter–Spring 1984
- Michon, Jean-Louis (2007), "Postscript: Titus Burckhardt à Fès", in Titus Burckhardt (ed.), Fès ville d'Islam (in French), Milan: Archè, p. 157-162, ISBN 978-88-7252-201-1
- Michon, Jean-Louis (2000), "Titus Burckhardt et le sens de la beauté : pourquoi, comment il a aimé le Maroc", in Jaafar Kansoussi (ed.), Sagesse et splendeur des arts islamiques : Hommage à Titus Burckhardt (in French), Marrakesh: Al Quobba Zarqua, p. 37-60
- Nasr, Seyyed Hossein (2020), "Avec Titus Burckhardt au tombeau d'Ibn Arabî", in Tayeb Chouiref (ed.), Titus Burckhardt : Le soufisme entre Orient et Occident, volume 1 (biographie, souvenirs et témoignages) (in French), Wattrelos, France: Tasnîm, p. 200-207, ISBN 979-109130027-8
- Nasr, Seyyed Hossein (2000), "La vision du sens spirituel de l'art islamique chez Titus Ibrahim Burckhardt", in Jaafar Kansoussi (ed.), Sagesse et splendeur des arts islamiques : Hommage à Titus Burckhardt (in French), Marrakesh: Al Quobba Zarqua, p. 61-73
- Nasr, Seyyed Hossein (2003), "Foreword", in William Stoddart (ed.), The Essential Titus Burckhardt: Reflections on Sacred Art, Faiths, and Civilizations, Bloomington/IN: World Wisdom, ISBN 0941532364
- Nasr, Seyyed Hossein (1999), "The Spiritual Significance of Islamic Art: The Vision of Titus Ibrahim Burckhardt", Sophia, 5 (2), Oakton/VA: Foundation for Traditional Studies
- Schaya, Leo (April–June 1984), "Souvenir d'une amitié", Études Traditionnelles (in French) (484), Paris: Éditions Traditionnelles: 79–80
- Stoddart, William (1992), "Introduction", in Titus Burckhardt (ed.), Miroir de l'intellect (in French), Lausanne, Switzerland: L’Âge d’Homme, ISBN 0-941532-36-4
- Stoddart, William (2003), "Introduction", in William Stoddart (ed.), The Essential Titus Burckhardt: Reflections on Sacred Art, Faiths, and Civilizations, Bloomington/IN: World Wisdom, ISBN 978-1-933-31638-3
- Stoddart, William (1999), "Titus Burckhardt and the Traditional School", Sophia, 5 (2), Oakton/VA: Foundation for Traditional Studies
- Suheyl Omar, Muhammed (2000), "Étude sur l'importance des œuvres de Ibrahim Azzedine (Titus Burckhardt)", in Jaafar Kansoussi (ed.), Sagesse et splendeur des arts islamiques : Hommage à Titus Burckhardt (in French), Marrakesh: Al Quobba Zarqua, p. 103-104, 125-140

== See also ==
- Kurt Almqvist
- Ananda Coomaraswamy
- Keith Critchlow
- James Cutsinger
- René Guénon
- Patrick Laude
- Martin Lings
- Jean-Louis Michon
- Seyyed Hossein Nasr
- Lord Northbourne
- Harry Oldmeadow
- Marco Pallis
- Whitall Perry
- Leo Schaya
- Frithjof Schuon
- Huston Smith
- William Stoddart
- Reza Shah-Kazemi
