= Michael O. Fitzgerald =

American author, editor and entrepreneur

- Born: 1949 (age 76–77)
- Occupations: author editor entrepreneur
- Notable work: Yellowtail: Crow Medicine Man and Sun Dance Chief
- Spouse: Judith Fitzgerald (m. 1972)
- Children: 1

Michael Oren Fitzgerald (born 1949) is an author, editor and entrepreneur. He and his wife, Judith Fitzgerald, have an adult son and live in Bloomington, Indiana.

== Author and editor ==
The first book Fitzgerald recorded and edited was Yellowtail: Crow Medicine Man and Sun Dance Chief. It is the story of the late Thomas Yellowtail, one of the most honored American Indian spiritual leaders of the last century. Choice Magazine wrote, “This book becomes the personal testament of a pivotal figure in recent Crow cultural history. The book describes in exquisite detail Yellowtail’s philosophy. Fitzgerald examines the place of the Sun Dance, and of the sacred, in the life and future of the Crow… It is a serious work of anthropology and history.” Fitzgerald first met Susie Yellowtail, who is now enshrined in the Montana Hall of Fame, when he was Joseph Epes Brown’s graduate teaching assistant at Indiana University, Bloomington, for “Religious Traditions of the North American Indians”. Fitzgerald spent the summer of 1971 living with Thomas and Susie Yellowtail on the Crow Indian Reservation in Wyola, Montana, where he participated in the tribal Sun Dance and was adopted into the Yellowtail family and the Crow tribe. Following Dr. Brown’s 1972 departure to Montana, Fitzgerald taught a course of the same name in the Indiana University (Bloomington) Continuing Studies Department for two years.

Fitzgerald married his wife, Judith, in 1972. The Yellowtails introduced the Fitzgeralds to many spiritual leaders of other American Indian tribes. Over the next forty years Judith and Michael Fitzgerald spent extended periods of time visiting reservations and attending sacred ceremonies throughout the American West, including the sacred rites of the Crow, Sioux, Cheyenne, Shoshone, Bannock, and Apache Tribes. Janine Pease, founding president of the Little Big Horn College, National Indian Educator of the Year and a McArthur Genius Award winner, had this to say about Fitzgerald's relationship with Indian people and cultures: “Michael Fitzgerald has heard the poignant narratives of the American Indian people, and has lived among the Crow people for extended periods of time since 1970. He has studied American Indian religious traditions on the earth, among the people, in ceremonies and family gatherings. We thank Fitzgerald for his deep-seated appreciation, honor, and respect for American Indian culture, its religion, language, and lifeways.” These contacts led to the creation of a number of books and two documentary films on the American Indians. Fitzgerald has also lectured widely on American Indian history and culture at various colleges and high schools.

All royalties from Fitzgerald’s books and films about American Indians are donated to different American Indian causes or used to perpetuate American Indian spiritual traditions. This includes the Smithsonian’s Museum of the American Indian, the American Indian College Fund, and the traditional ceremonies of the Crow, Lakota, Apache, and Shoshone. Fitzgerald is both a Director and the Secretary of the Trehero-Trosper Sun Dance Inc., a not-for-profit organization dedicated to the perpetuation of Shoshone traditional ceremonies and culture.

As a fierce advocate of preserving indigenous languages, Fitzgerald is a co-founder of the Crow Language Consortium, a subsidiary of the Language Conservancy, and is also a member of the Advisory Board of the Language Conservancy. The Fitzgerald family provides ongoing financial contributions that include underwriting Crow language textbooks and the establishment of a permanent endowment for the Language Conservancy with the Bloomington Community Foundation.

Fitzgerald is an author and editor of more than twenty books that have received more than forty-five awards, including the ForeWord Book of the Year Award, The Ben Franklin Award and three USA Best Book Awards. His books have been published in six different languages, and at least ten of his books and two documentary films produced by him are used in university classes. A selected bibliography is listed below.

== Selected bibliography ==
The following is a selected bibliography of recent and awarding winning titles authored, edited or co-edited by Michael Fitzgerald:

- Letters of Frithjof Schuon: Reflections on the Perennial Philosophy, by Frithjof Schuon, edited by Michael O. Fitzgerald, 2022
- Spirit of the Indian Warrior, co-edited with Joseph A. Fitzgerald, 2019
  - Silver Medal in the “Interior Design” category of the 2020 Midwest Book Awards
  - Silver Medal in the “History/General” category of the 2020 Midwest Book Awards
- Spirit of the Earth: Indian Voices on Nature, edited by Michael Fitzgerald and Joseph A. Fitzgerald, 2017
  - Winner in the “Multicultural Non-Fiction” category of the 2018 Best Book Awards
  - Finalist in the “Best Interior Design” category of the 2018 Best Book Awards
  - Finalist in the “Spirituality: Inspirational” category of the 2018 Best Book Awards
  - Silver Medal in the 2017 Foreword INDIES Book of the Year Awards in the category “Body, Mind & Spirit”
  - Finalist in the 2017 Foreword INDIES Book of the Year Awards in the category “Nature”
  - Gold Medal in the “Religion/Philosophy/Spirituality” category of the 2018 Midwest Book Awards
  - Silver Medal winner in the “Gift Book” category of the 2017 Benjamin Franklin Book of the Year Awards
- Indian Boyhood: The True Story of a Sioux Upbringing, by Charles Eastman (Ohiyesa), edited and adapted by Michael Fitzgerald, 2016
  - Winner in the “Children’s Picture Book: Hardcover Non-Fiction” category of the 2016 USA “Best Book” Awards
  - Silver Medal in the “Children’s Picture Books” category of the 2016 Midwest Book Awards
  - Finalist in the 2016 Reading the West Awards (by MPIBA) for the “Children’s” category
- Yellowtail, Crow Medicine Man and Sun Dance Chief: An Autobiography, by Thomas Yellowtail recorded by Michael Fitzgerald, 1994
- Children of the Tipi: Life in the Buffalo Days (author), 2013
- A King James Christmas: Biblical Selections with Illustrations from Around the World, edited by Catherine Schuon and Michael Fitzgerald, 2012
  - Gold Midwest Book Award for “Inspiration/Gift Book”
- Frithjof Schuon: Messenger of the Perennial Philosophy (author), 2010
  - Best Book 2011 Award Finalist for “Biography: General” by USA Book News
- Living in Two Worlds: The American Indian Experience, by Charles Eastman (Ohiyesa), edited by Michael Fitzgerald, 2009
  - Winner of the Foreword Magazine 2010 Book of Year for “Social Science”, Finalist for “History”
  - Winner of the Benjamin Franklin Award for "Multicultural" books
  - Best Book 2011 Award Winner for “Multicultural Non-Fiction” by USA Book News
  - Best Book 2011 Award Finalist for “Best Interior Design” & "History: United States" categories by USA Book News
  - Winner of three Gold Midwest Book Awards for “Culture”, “Interior Layout”, and “Color Cover”
  - Winner of two Silver Midwest Book Awards for “History” and “Total Book Design"
- Foundations of Oriental Art & Symbolism, by Titus Burckhardt, edited by Michael Fitzgerald, 2009
  - Silver Midwest Book Award for “Illustration”
- Christian Spirit, co-edited with Judith Fitzgerald, 2004.
  - Winner Midwest Book Award for “Religion/Philosophy”
- The Sermon of all Creation: Christians on Nature, co-edited with Judith Fitzgerald, 2005.
  - Silver Midwest Book Award for “Nature”
  - Silver Midwest Book Award for “Religion/Philosophy”
- The Spirit of Indian Women, co-edited with Judith Fitzgerald, 2005.
  - Winner Midwest Book Award for “Multicultural”
  - Winner Midwest Book Award for “Religion/Philosophy”
- The Universal Spirit of Islam: From the Koran and Hadith, co-edited with Judith Fitzgerald, 2006.
  - Silver Midwest Book Award for “Religion/Philosophy/Inspiration”
  - Silver Benjamin Franklin Award for “Religion”
  - Foreword Magazine Book of the Year Award Finalist for “Religion”
- Indian Spirit: Revised & Enlarged, co-edited with Judith Fitzgerald, 2006.
  - Winner Midwest Book Award for “Culture”
  - Winner Midwest Book Award for “Religion/Philosophy/Inspiration”
- The Foundations of Christian Art: Illustrated, by Titus Burckhardt, edited by Michael Fitzgerald 2006.
  - Winner Midwest Book Award for “Interior Layout”
  - Silver Benjamin Franklin Award for “Arts”
- Native Spirit: The Sun Dance Way, by Thomas Yellowtail, recorded and edited by Michael Fitzgerald, 2007.
  - Winner Midwest Book Award for “Culture”
  - Midwest Book Award for “Religion/Philosophy/Inspiration”
  - Silver Benjamin Franklin Award “New Age/Metaphysics/Spirituality”
- The Essential Charles Eastman (Ohiyesa): Light on the Indian World (revised & updated edition), by Charles Eastman (Ohiyesa), edited by Michael Fitzgerald, 2007.
  - Silver Midwest Book Award for “Religion/Philosophy/Inspiration”
- The Spiritual Legacy of the American Indian: Commemorative Edition With Letters While Living With Black Elk, by Joseph Epes Brown, co-edited with Elenita Brown and Marina Brown Weatherly, 2007.
- Introduction to Hindu Dharma: Illustrated, by Jagadguru His Holiness Sri Chandrasekharendra Saraswathi Swamigal, edited by Michael Fitzgerald 2008.

Fitzgerald also produced two documentary films:

- The Sun Dance Way, 2006.
  - Official Selection for the “Montreal First Peoples’ Festival”
  - Official Selection for the “American Indian Film Festival”
- Native Spirit, 2007.
  - Official Selection for the “American Indian Film Festival”
  - Official Selection for the “Talking Stick Film Festival”

== Entrepreneurial career ==
Michael Fitzgerald founded or co-founded more than a dozen successful businesses in Bloomington, Indiana. The largest is Sunrise Greetings/ InterArt Holding Corporation, which was a $72 million greeting card company when he sold it to Hallmark cards in 1998. The businesses Fitzgerald co-founded employed approximately 1,000 people from 1997 through 2000. Fitzgerald retired from day-to-day business activity in 2000 to focus on his writing.

Fitzgerald's other Bloomington, IN area businesses include The Bakehouse (now the Scholar’s Inn Bakehouse), Perennial Designs, Leather Ltd, Devonshire Equestrian Center (now Rocky River Farm), Russell Road Water Corporation and Deer Park Management.

Fitzgerald holds an Honor’s Degree in Religious Studies from Indiana University, with Phi Beta Kappa and Magna Cum Laude distinctions, and a Doctor of Jurisprudence from Indiana University Maurer School of Law - Bloomington with Cum Laude distinction.

== See also ==
- Perennial Philosophy
- Frithjof Schuon
- René Guénon
- Titus Burckhardt
- Ananda Coomaraswamy
- Martin Lings
- Tage Lindbom
- William Stoddart
- Whitall Perry
- Harry Oldmeadow
- Patrick Laude
