= Frithjof Schuon =

Swiss philosopher, poet and painter (1907–1998)

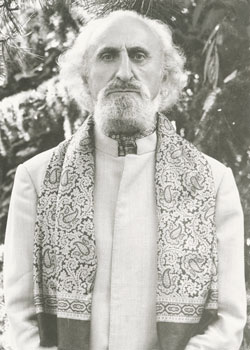
- Frithjof Schuon, c. 1980
- Born: 18 June 1907; Basel, Switzerland
- Died: 5 May 1998 (aged 90); Bloomington, Indiana, U.S.

Philosophical work
- School: Perennial philosophy Traditionalist School
- Main interests: Metaphysics, esoterism, philosophy, spirituality, religion, art
- Notable works: The Transcendent Unity of Religions; The Eye of the Heart; Logic and Transcendence; Esoterism as Principle and as Way; Form and Substance in the Religions

Frithjof Schuon (/ˈʃuːɒn/ SHOO-on; German: [ˈfʁɪtjɔf ˈʃuːɔn]; 18 June 1907 – 5 May 1998) was a Swiss philosopher and spiritual leader, belonging to the Traditionalist School of Perennialism. He was the author of more than twenty works in French on metaphysics, spirituality, religion, anthropology, and art. He was also a painter and a poet.

With René Guénon and Ananda Coomaraswamy, Schuon was one of the major 20th-century representatives of the philosophia perennis. Like them, he affirmed the reality of an absolute Principle – God – from which the universe emanates, and maintained that all divine revelations, despite their differences, possess a common essence: one and the same Truth. He also shared with them the certitude that man is potentially capable of supra-rational knowledge, and undertook a sustained critique of the modern mentality severed, according to him, from its traditional roots. Following Plato, Plotinus, Adi Shankara, Meister Eckhart, Ibn Arabī, and other metaphysicians, Schuon sought to affirm the metaphysical unity between the Principle and its manifestation.

Initiated by Sheikh Ahmad al-Alawī into the Sufi Shādhilī order, he founded the Tarīqa Maryamiyya. His writings emphasize the universality of metaphysical doctrine, along with the necessity of practicing a religion; he also insists on the importance of the virtues and of beauty.

Schuon cultivated close relationships with a large number of personages of diverse religious and spiritual horizons. He had a particular interest in the traditions of the North American Plains Indians, maintaining firm friendships with a number of their leaders and being adopted into both a Lakota Sioux tribe and the Crow tribe. Having spent a large part of his life in France and Switzerland, at the age of 73 he moved to Bloomington, Indiana, where he had a community of disciples.

== Life and work ==
=== Basel, Switzerland (1907–1920) ===
Frithjof Schuon was born in Basel, in the German-speaking part of Switzerland, on 18 June 1907. He was the younger of the two sons of Paul Schuon and Margarete Boehler, both of whom were of German origin (the former from Swabia and the latter from Alsace). His father was a concert violinist, and the household was one in which not only music but literary and spiritual culture were present. The Schuons, themselves raised as Catholics, brought their sons up as Protestants, though not in hostility to the Catholic Church.

At primary school, Schuon met the future author Titus Burckhardt, who remained a lifelong friend. From the age of ten, he began to read the Bible, the Upanishads, the Bhagavad-Gītā and the Quran, as well as Plato, Emerson, Goethe and Schiller. Schuon would later say that in his early youth four things had always moved him most profoundly: "the holy, the great, the beautiful, the childlike."

=== France (1920–1940) ===
In 1920, Schuon's father died and his mother decided to return with her young sons to her family in nearby Mulhouse, France, where Schuon became a French citizen, consequent upon the Treaty of Versailles. One year later, when he was 14, he was baptized as a Catholic. In 1923 his brother entered a Trappist monastery, and Schuon left school in order to provide for the family, finding work as a textile designer.

He then began an intense study of the Bhagavad-Gītā and the Vedānta. In 1924, while still living in Mulhouse, he discovered the works of the French philosopher René Guénon, which had a significant impact on his thought, confirming the intuitions of his youth. Schuon would later say of Guénon that he was "the profound and powerful theoretician of all that he loved".

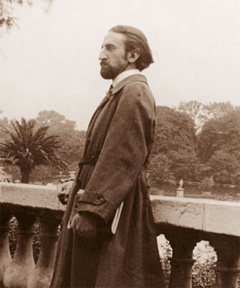
Paris, 1930

In 1930, after 18 months in Besançon on military service in the French army, Schuon settled in Paris. There he resumed his profession as a textile designer, and began to study Arabic in the local mosque school. Living in Paris also gave him the opportunity to be exposed to various forms of traditional art to a much greater degree than before, especially the arts of Asia with which he had had a deep affinity since his youth.

At the end of 1932 he completed his first book, Leitgedanken zur Urbesinnung, which would be published in 1935 and later translated into English under the title Primordial Meditation: Contemplating the Real. His desire to leave the West, whose modern values he rejected, combined with his growing interest in Islam, prompted him to go to Marseille, a port of departure for the East. There he made the acquaintance of two disciples of Sheikh Ahmad al-Alawī, a Sufi in Mostaganem, Algeria. Schuon saw the sign of his destiny in these encounters, and embarked for Algeria. In Mostaganem he entered Islam, and spent nearly four months in the Sheikh's zāwiya. The Sheikh gave him initiation and named him `Īsā Nūr ad-Dīn. However, Schuon was soon forced to return to Europe under pressure from the French colonial authorities.

Schuon did not consider his affiliation to Islam as a conversion, since he did not disavow Christianity; in each revelation he saw the expression of one and the same truth, in different forms. But for him, in the Guenonian perspective that he held at the time, Western Christianity no longer seemed to offer the possibility of following a "path of knowledge" under the guidance of a spiritual master, whereas such a path was still open within the framework of Sufism, Islamic esoterism.

Schuon reported that one night in July 1934, while reading the Bhagavad-Gītā, the divine Name Allāh took hold of him, and that for three days he could do nothing but invoke it ceaselessly. Shortly afterwards, he learned that his Sheikh had died on the same day.

In 1935 he returned to the zāwiya of Mostaganem, where Sheikh Adda ben Tounes, Sheikh al-Alawī's successor, conferred on him the function of muqaddam, thus authorizing him to initiate aspirants into the Alawī brotherhood. Returning to Europe, Schuon founded a zāwiya in Basel, another in Lausanne and a third in Amiens. He resumed his profession as a textile designer in Alsace for the next four years.

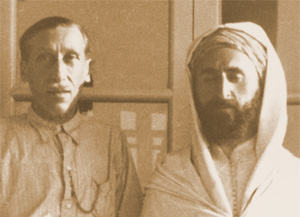
With René Guénon (left) in Cairo, 1938

One night towards the end of 1936, after a spiritual experience, Schuon sensed, without a shadow of a doubt, that he had been invested with the function of spiritual master, of sheikh. This was confirmed, he later related, by visionary dreams that several of his disciples reported having had the same night. (Note: This was also the case for the investiture of Sheikh al-Alawī – Schuon's master –, since Sheikh al-Būzīdī had not designated a successor. Jean-Baptiste Aymard, Frithjof Schuon: Life and Teachings, SUNY, 2002, pp. 22–23 + Martin Lings, A Sufi Saint of the Twentieth Century, George Allen and Unwin, 1971, p. 63.) The differences of perspective between Schuon and the Mostaganem zāwiya gradually led to Schuon's assuming independence, (Note: As did his own sheikh, Ahmad al-Alawī, with regard to the Darqāwīyyah tariqa. Martin Lings, A Sufi Saint of the Twentieth Century, George Allen and Unwin, 1971, p 84.) supported by Guénon.

In 1938, Schuon traveled to Egypt, where he met Guénon, with whom he had been in correspondence for 7 years. In 1939, he embarked for India with two disciples, making a long stopover in Cairo, where he saw Guénon again. Shortly after his arrival in Bombay, World War II broke out, forcing him to return to Europe. Serving in the French army, he was interned by the Nazis, who were planning to incorporate all soldiers of Alsatian origin into the German army to fight on the Russian front. Schuon escaped to Switzerland, which was to be his home for forty years.

=== Lausanne, Switzerland (1941–1980) ===
He settled in Lausanne, where he continued contributing to the Guénonian journal Études Traditionnelles, as he had done since 1933. In 1947, after reading Black Elk Speaks by John G. Neihardt, Schuon, who had always been interested in the North American Indians, was convinced that Black Elk knew much more about Sioux tradition than was contained in the book. He asked his American friends to seek out the old chief. Following this initiative, the ethnologist Joseph E. Brown collected from Black Elk the description of the seven Sioux rites which would form the content of The Sacred Pipe.

In 1948 Schuon published his first book in French, De l'Unité transcendante des religions. Of this book, T. S. Eliot wrote: "I have met with no more impressive work in the comparative study of Oriental and Occidental religion." All his subsequent works – more than twenty – would be written in French, apart from a major reworking in German of the text of The Transcendent Unity of Religions (Von der Inneren Einheit der Religionen), published in 1982.

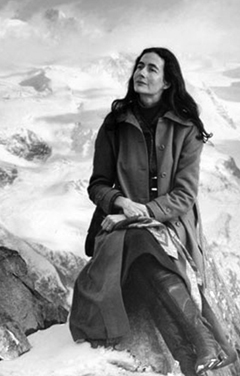
Catherine Schuon in the Swiss Alps

In 1949 Schuon married Catherine Feer, a German Swiss with a French education who, besides being interested in religion and metaphysics, was also a painter. He received Swiss citizenship shortly after his marriage. Schuon and his wife travelled widely. Between 1950 and 1975, the couple visited Morocco about ten times, as well as numerous European countries, including Greece and Turkey, where they visited the house near Ephesus presumed to be the last home of the Virgin Mary.

In the winter of 1953, Schuon and his wife travelled to Paris to attend performances organized by a group of Crow dancers. They formed a friendship with Thomas Yellowtail, the future medicine man and Sun Dance Chief. Five years later, the Schuons visited the Brussels World's Fair, where 60 Sioux were giving performances on the theme of the Wild West. New friendships were made on this occasion also.

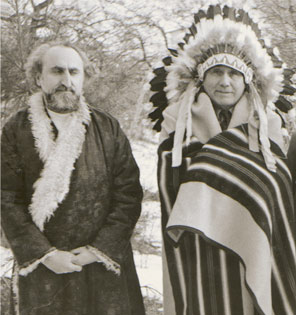
With Thomas Yellowtail in Lausanne, 1954

In 1959 and again in 1963, at the invitation of their Indian friends, the Schuons traveled to the American West, where they visited various Plains tribes and had the opportunity to witness many aspects of their traditions. During the first of these visits, Schuon and his wife were adopted into the Sioux family of Chief James Red Cloud, grandson of Chief Red Cloud, and a few weeks later, at an Indian festival in Sheridan, Wyoming, they were officially received into the Sioux tribe. Schuon's writings on Native American religion and his paintings of their way of life attest to his affinity with their spiritual universe.

According to Mark Sedgwick, in 1965 Schuon entered into a "vertical" or "spiritual" marriage with one of his married followers. The woman did not dissolve her existing marriage and continued to live with her husband (another follower). This arrangement was not widely known until the late 1980s, although Burckhardt and Lings were aware of it. Schuon took on two other "vertical" wives over the course of the next three decades.

The 1970s saw the publication of three works considered as particularly important by his biographers composed of articles previously published in the French journal Études Traditionnelles. These works have been translated under the titles Logic and Transcendence, Form and Substance in the Religions, and Esoterism as Principle and as Way.

Throughout his life, Schuon had great respect for and devotion to the Virgin Mary, and expressed this in his writings and paintings. The significance of the Virgin Mary in Schuon's life and teachings has been studied in detail by American professor James Cutsinger, who relates the two episodes in 1965 when Schuon experienced a Marian grace. Hence the name Maryamiyya ("Marian" in Arabic) of the Sufi tarīqa he founded as a branch of the Alawiyyah-Darqawiyyah-Shadhiliyyah order.

=== United States (1980–1998) ===
In 1980, Schuon and his wife emigrated to the United States, settling in Bloomington, Indiana, where there was already a large community of disciples. The first years in Bloomington saw the publication of a number of important works including From the Divine to the Human, To Have a Center, Survey of Metaphysics and Esoterism, and Roots of the Human Condition.

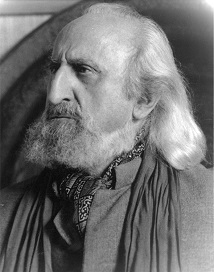
Bloomington, c. 1990

According to Patrick Laude, Schuon became known, through his many books, articles and letters, "as the principal spokesman of the intellectual current sometimes referred to in English speaking countries as perennialism", or the Traditionalist School. During his years in Lausanne and Bloomington he regularly received visits from "practitioners and representatives of diverse religions".

Thomas Yellowtail remained Schuon's intimate friend until his death in 1993, visiting him every year and adopting him into the Crow tribe in 1984. During these sojourns, Schuon and some of his followers organized what they called "Indian Days", in which Native American dances were performed, leading some to accuse him of practicing ritual nudity. These gatherings were understood by disciples as a sharing in Schuon's personal insights and realization, not as part of the initiatic method he transmitted, centered on Islamic prayer and the dhikr.

In 1991, following an allegation by a former follower, Schuon was indicted for "sexual battery and child molestation.” However, a few weeks later the case was dropped. The prosecutor stated that there was “not one shred of evidence” aside from the follower's testimony and that “Insofar as [Schuon] has been labeled, a miscarriage has occurred.” Despite the dismissal, the incident led some followers to leave the Maryamiyya Order and negatively affected Schuon’s reputation within Traditionalist and Sufi circles.

In 1992, at the age of 85, Schuon retired from directing the Maryamiyya order. He continued to receive visitors and maintain a correspondence with followers, scholars and readers. In the last years of his life, he wrote a major collection of over three thousand lyrical "teaching-poems" (Lehrgedichte), which combine metaphysics and spiritual counsel, as well as reminiscences of his life. Like the poems of his youth, these were written in his native German, following a series in Arabic and another in English. They are a poetic synthesis of his philosophical and spiritual message, which is articulated around four key elements: "truth, prayer, virtue and beauty". Less than two months before his death on 5 May 1998 at the age of 90, Frithjof Schuon wrote his last poem:

F. Schuon recites his last poem (1998)

Ich wollte dieses Buch schon lang beschließen –
Ich konnte nicht; ich musste weiter dichten.
Doch diesmal legt sich meine Feder nieder,
Denn es gibt andres Sinnen, andre Pflichten;
Wie dem auch sei, was wir auch mögen tun:
Lasst uns dem Ruf des Höchsten Folge leisten –
Lasst uns in Gottes tiefem Frieden ruhn.
Das Weltrad VII, CXXX

I have for long wished to end this book —
I could not do so; I had to write more poems.
But this time my pen lies down of itself,
For there are other preoccupations, other duties;
Be that as it may, whatever we may wish to do:
Let us follow the call of the Most High —
Let us repose in God's deep Peace.
World Wheel VII, CXXX

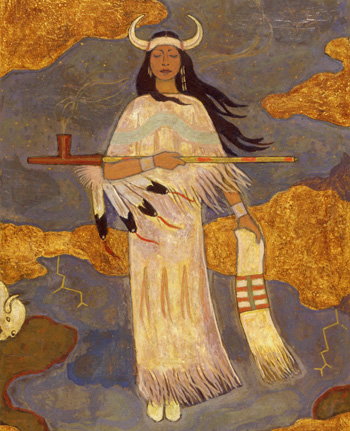
"Apparition of the White Buffalo Calf Woman" (detail), oil painting by F. Schuon, 1959

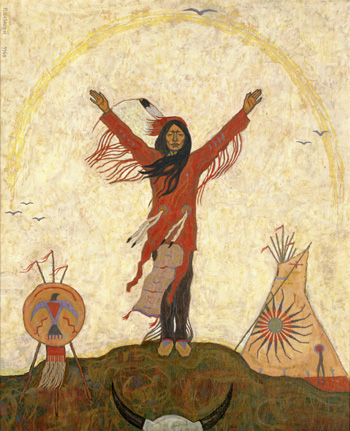
"Salutation to the Great Spirit", oil painting by F. Schuon, 1963

== Views based on his written works ==
For Seyyed Hossein Nasr, Schuon is at once "metaphysician, theologian, traditional philosopher and logician", versed in "comparative religion", in "traditional art and civilization", as well as in "the science of man and society"; he is also known as "a critic of the modern world in not only its practical but also its philosophical and scientific aspects". In his writings, Schuon's principal themes are "essential and hence universal metaphysics with its cosmological and anthropological ramifications, spirituality in the broadest sense, intrinsic morals and aesthetics, traditional principles and phenomena", religions and their esotericisms, sacred art.

=== Doctrinal foundation ===
==== Perennialism ====
The traditionalist or perennialist spiritual perspective was initially formulated in the 1920s by René Guénon and in the 1930s by Frithjof Schuon. The metaphysicians and art specialists Ananda Coomaraswamy and Titus Burckhardt also became advocates of this intellectual current. According to the perennialist writer William Stoddart, "the central idea of the perennial philosophy is that Divine Truth is one, timeless and universal, and that the different religions are but different languages expressing that one Truth" – hence the title given by Schuon to his first book in French, De l'unité transcendante des religions. For Patrick Laude, a perennialist author is "one who claims the universality and primordiality of fundamental metaphysical principles and the perennity of the wisdom that actualizes these principles in man, as expressed in all great revelations and major teachings of sages and saints throughout the ages". Schuon writes that primordial wisdom is expressed in the work of Adi Shankara, Pythagoras, Plato, Plotinus and several other representatives of quintessential esoterism.

In Survey of Metaphysics and Esoterism, Schuon comments on the three notions of perennial philosophy (philosophia), perennial wisdom (sophia) and perennial religion (religio) to show both their concordance and their particularities:

The term philosophia perennis, which appeared as early as the Renaissance and was used extensively by neo-scholasticism, designates the science of the fundamental and universal ontological principles; a science that is immutable like these principles themselves, and primordial by the very fact of its universality and infallibility. We would readily use the term sophia perennis to indicate that this is not a matter of "philosophy" in the standard and approximative meaning of the word – suggesting mere mental constructions springing from ignorance, doubt, and conjectures, indeed from the taste for novelty and originality – or we could also use the term religio perennis when referring to the operative side of this wisdom, thus its mystical or initiatic aspect.

For Laude, it is not the notion of the "transcendental unity of religions" that primarily characterizes Schuon's teaching, but rather "a reformulation of the sophia perennis, or religio perennis, conceived as the conjunction of a metaphysical doctrine and a means of spiritual realization".

==== Metaphysics ====
Schuon characterizes "pure" metaphysics as 1) "essential", i.e. "independent of all religious formulation"; 2) "primordial", namely "the truth that existed before all dogmatic formalism"; and 3) "universal", in that it "encompasses all intrinsically orthodox symbolism" and "can therefore be combined with any religious language". For him, pure metaphysics can be summarized by the following vedantic statement: Brahma satyam jagan mithyā jīvo brahmaiva nāparah (Brahman is real, the world is illusory, the individual soul is not different from Brahman).

The metaphysics expounded by Schuon is based on the doctrine of what the Hindu Advaita Vedānta (Note: advaita (Sanskrit): non-duality) refers to as Ātmā and Māyā. Ātmā (Ātman) is the Self, both transcendent and immanent; in correlation with Māyā, Ātmā designates the Real, the Absolute, the Principle, Beyond Being, Brahma (Brahman); and Māyā the illusory, the relative, manifestation. Schuon develops this metaphysical principle in his book Form and Substance in the Religions, basing himself on the Sufi doctrine of the degrees of reality, known as "The Five Divine Presences":

- Degrees 1 and 2, taken together, correspond to God, the Principle, the Absolute:

1. Ātmā: Beyond-Being, Impersonal Divinity, Supreme Principle, Absolute Reality, Essence, nirguna Brahman.

- Degrees 2 to 5 correspond to Māyā:

2. Māyā in divinis (the "relative Absolute", "Ātmā as Māyā"): Being, Personal God, creating Principle, uncreated Spirit, saguna Brahman, Īshvara. (Note: Schuon held that the distinction "Beyond-Being/Being" only applies in metaphysics, and never in the relationship between man, as a contingent subject, and God. William Stoddart, "Lossky's Palamitism in the Light of Schuon", Sacred Web Journal, Vol. 6, 2000, p. 23)

- Degrees 3 to 5 correspond to manifestation, the cosmos, creation:

3. Supra-formal manifestation: created Spirit (Intellect, Logos, Buddhi), paradise, angels.

- Degrees 4 and 5 correspond to formal manifestation:

4. Subtle or animic manifestation: the world of the soul and the "spirits" (jinns, sylphs, salamanders, gnomes, etc.).

5. Gross or material manifestation: the visible world.

In the human being (the microcosm) the five degrees, ordered inversely, correspond to the body and the sensorial, mortal soul (5); the supra-sensorial, immortal soul (4); the created spirit (or intellect) (3); the uncreated spirit (or intellect) (2); the absolute and infinite Self (1). The presence of the three superior degrees in man "made in the image of God" confers upon him the possibility of a knowledge that transcends the limitations of subjectivity, thus in principle allowing him to "see things as they are", that is, objectively: this is gnosis.

As did Plato in ancient Greece, Adi Shankara in Hinduism, Meister Eckhardt and St Gregory Palamas in Christianity and Ibn Arabī in Islam – to name some examples –, Schuon states that the essential discernment in metaphysics is that between the Real and the non-real (the illusory), Ātmā and Māyā. He emphasizes that the Real, or Beyond Being, which is absolute and infinite, is the essence of all good (the Sovereign Good). As St Augustine held, it is in the nature of the Good (Agathôn) to radiate, hence the projection of Māyā, which is simultaneously divine (Īshvara), celestial (Buddhi and Svarga) and "earthly", the latter including the domain of transmigration (samsâra). Every good offered by the world comes from the radiation of the Sovereign Good, every evil comes from Its remoteness. Mâyâ both veils and reveals God, the Absolute.

==== Quintessential esoterism ====
Most religions comprise an exoteric and an esoteric dimension. This religious esoterism is qualified as "relative" by Schuon, to differentiate it from "absolute" or "quintessential" esoterism, which is neither limited nor totally expressed by a particular religious form.

For Schuon, integral metaphysics – which starts from the distinction between Ātmā and Māyā (the Absolute and the relative) – is the very substance of pure esoterism. To the metaphysical doctrine must be joined a method of realization because, as Patrick Laude states :

The esoteric perspective is not reducible to a conceptual understanding, since it is essentially an intellective and "existential" conformity to Reality or a spiritual and moral assimilation of the nature of things. As Frithjof Schuon has often reminded us, to know is to be. Lived esoterism is, at its apex, the wisdom in which being and knowing coincide.

There is therefore continuity between exoterism and esoterism when the latter appears as the inner dimension of the former and consequently adopts its "language", and there is discontinuity when esoterism transcends all religion: this is the religio perennis, the timeless, essential, primordial and universal esoterism. It constitutes "the transcendent unity of religions" and is based, methodically, on one of the revelations while having as its object the one Truth common to all of them.

==== Sufism ====
For Schuon, Sufism (tasawwuf, in Arabic) – "the marrow of Islam" – is essentially "sincerity of faith". "On the doctrinal level" this sincerity arises from an "intellectual vision" which draws "from the idea of Unity its most rigorous consequences; its ultimate conclusion is not only the idea of the nothingness of the world but also that of supreme Identity." Patrick Laude underlines the distinction made by Schuon between a "quintessential", purely esoteric, Sufism and a "moderate" Sufism which, though tending towards esoterism, remains dependent on the exoteric mentality, whence a propensity to the "intensification of pious acts, emotional exteriorization, obediential zeal, and an inordinate emphasis on formal scruples and the perspective of fear." For Laude, "the most accurate and succinct definition" of quintessential Sufism – as of every other spirituality in its essential dimension – is "Schuon's fundamental doctrinal dyad, entailing discernment between the Absolute and the relative, along with the corresponding method of exclusive concentration on the Absolute."

Schuon considers that "the whole of Sufism [...] [can be] summed up in these four words: Haqq, Qalb, Dhikr, Faqr : "Truth," "Heart," "Remembrance," "Poverty."

- al-haqq (truth, reality) "coincides with the Shahādah, the twofold testimony ("lā ilāha illā Llāh, Muhammadun rasūlu Llāh: there is no god but God, Muhammad is the envoy of God"), which enounces "metaphysical, cosmological, mystical and eschatological Truth." Summarizing Schuon, Laude states that the first testimony means theologically or exoterically that there is only one God, and metaphysically, that He is the only reality. This latter meaning – that of the Sufis – signifies for Schuon not only "that God alone is real, in contrast to the world, which, being contingent, is illusory", but also "that no existence can be situated outside God, that everything that exists 'is not other than He', otherwise the world would not exist". Laude states that this second meaning also emerges from the second testimony, which esoterically enounces the unitive relationship between "the conditioned and the Unconditioned, the relative and the Absolute".
- al-qalb (the heart) "is the existential and intellectual centre" of the human being, "the seat of the divine Presence and thus also of metaphysical certitude", and also, more commonly, the seat of faith. "It represents the Intellect with respect to both knowledge and love" and "thanks to the miracle of immanence, it opens onto the divine Self and onto the infinitude, both extinctive and unitive, of the knowable, hence of the Real". Thus truth (al-haqq) "must not be accepted with the mind alone but with the Heart, thus with all that we are".
- al-dhikr (remembrance, mention, invocation) is for Schuon "the actualization of faith or gnosis by means of the sacramental word", whose seat is the heart. Although the word dhikr encompasses all practices directed towards God, Harry Oldmeadow emphasizes that Schuon, when he speaks of Sufism, always uses this term in its highest sense: the invocation of the name "Allāh". According to Laude, this rite – subject to authorization –, is considered by Schuon, in accordance with the Sufi tradition, to be "the central practice of tasawwuf". To the question "why invoke?", Schuon answers: "the most profound reason would no doubt be 'because I exist', for Existence is in a certain way the Word of God, by which He names Himself. God pronounces His Name in order to manifest Himself – to 'create' – in the direction of 'nothingness', and the relative being pronounces this Name in order to 'be', that is to say, to 'become once again what he is' in the direction of Reality". "The supreme Name", whatever the spiritual path practiced, "is both metaphysical Truth and saving Presence".
- al-faqr (spiritual poverty) is "simplicity and purity of soul, rendering possible" the actualization of faith or gnosis "by conferring upon it the sincerity without which no act is valid". For Laude, commenting on the Schuonian perspective, al-faqr is "humility as the absence of all egocentricity and an emptiness for God." Schuon sees "spiritual virtue par excellence" in this attitude of "holy poverty" or "effacement", an attitude that implies "detachment, sobriety, patience, contentment", "resignation to the Will of God and trust in His Mercy"; it is "like an anticipation of extinction in God".

=== Spiritual practice ===
==== Spiritual path ====
According to the writer Ali Lakhani, "Schuon emphasizes that the meaning of life is nothing less than the quest for [...] God, [...] for the Truth that resides within each of us; [...] it is the return to the heart-consciousness of the Divine Presence." For Schuon, man is "a bridge between Earth and Heaven"; on the other hand, "the notion of the Absolute and the love of God constitute the very essence of [his] subjectivity; this subjectivity [...] is a proof both of [his] immortality and of God; [it] is, properly speaking, a theophany." (Note: "Some will no doubt point out that Buddhism proves that the notion of God has nothing fundamental about it, and that one can very well dispense with it both in metaphysics and spirituality. They would be right if the Buddhists did not possess the idea of the Absolute or that of transcendence, or that of immanent Justice with its complement, Mercy; this is all that is needed to show that Buddhism, if it does not possess the word for God — or if it does not possess our word — in any case possesses the reality itself. [...] 'Extinction' or the 'Void' is 'God' subjectivized; 'God' is the objective 'Void'." Schuon, Logic and Transcendence, Perennial Books, 1984, p. 60 + Treasures of Buddhism, World Wisdom, 2018, p. 16)

Schuon held that religious or spiritual life offers three fundamental paths, which correspond to as many human temperaments: 1) the path of action, works, asceticism, fear (the karma-mārga or karma-yoga of Hinduism); 2) the path of love, of devotion (bhakti-mārga); and 3) the path of gnosis, of unitive contemplation (jñāna-mārga); in Sufism: makhāfah, mahabbah, ma`rifah. The first two are dualistic and exoteric, (Note: In fact, "the second extends from exoterism to esoterism". Schuon, In the Face of the Absolute, World Wisdom, 1989, p. 197) and are based on revelation, whereas the path of knowledge is monistic and esoteric, and based on intellection supported by revelation. Just as the path of love cannot do without good works and reverential fear, so the esoteric or metaphysical path cannot exclude the two other modes.

According to Schuon, the path of knowledge or of gnosis, which is present at the heart of every religion, is essentially: 1) discernment between the Real and the illusory, ātmā and māyā, nirvāna and samsāra, the Absolute and the relative, God and the world; 2) concentration on the Real, and 3) intrinsic morality, virtue. This discernment would remain purely mental in the absence of concentration on the Real through rites and prayer, i.e. without an effective link with God, the Sovereign Good, based on an authentic piety and sufficient detachment from the ego and from the world. The way towards God, as Schuon states, "always involves an inversion: from outwardness one must pass to inwardness, from multiplicity to unity, from dispersion to concentration, from egoism to detachment, from passion to serenity."

Schuon emphasizes that the exoteric and esoteric rites of the religion practiced – and of that one alone – are the basis for the spiritual method. (Note: "It is true that metaphysical truth transcends all forms, and thus all religions by definition; but man is a form, and he cannot attain to the non-formal except from within form; otherwise religions would not exist. The religious form must be transcended within religion itself, in its esoterism." Schuon, Towards the Essential: Letters of a Spiritual Master, The Matheson Trust, 2021, p. 240) Prayer is its central element, for without it – and without divine grace – the heart cannot assimilate or realize what the mind has been able to grasp. Schuon identifies three modes of prayer: personal prayer in which the worshipper opens himself spontaneously and informally to God; canonical, impersonal prayer, prescribed by his tradition; and invocatory prayer or "prayer of the heart" (japa, dhikr), which "is already a death and a meeting with God and places us already in Eternity; it is already something of Paradise and even, in its mysterious and 'uncreated' quintessence, something of God". This form of prayer is the invocation of a divine name, a sacred formula, a mantra; (Note: "The most diverse traditions agree in this, that the best support for concentration and the best means to obtain Deliverance at the end of the Kali-Yuga is the invocation of a revealed Divine Name. [...] The foundation of this mystery is, on the one hand, that 'God and his Name are one' (Rāmakrishna), and on the other, that God himself pronounces his Name in himself, hence in eternity and outside all creation, so that his unique and uncreate word is the prototype of jaculatory prayer and even, in a less direct sense, of all orison." Schuon, Towards the Essential: Letters of a Spiritual Master, The Matheson Trust, 2021, p. 170 + Stations of Wisdom, World Wisdom, 1995, p. 125) it reconciles the transcendence and the immanence of Truth, because if, on the one hand, Truth transcends us infinitely, the gnostic, states Schuon, knows that it is also "inscribed in an eternal script in the very substance of [his] spirit"; God is both the highest and the deepest, and the knowledge the realized being has of God is in reality the knowledge that God has of Himself through that being.

==== Virtue ====
In his writings, Schuon states that the two requirements of doctrine and method would remain inoperative without a third element, virtue, since the spiritual path must necessarily integrate the three fundamental human faculties, namely intelligence (doctrine, truth, discernment), will (method, prayer, concentration) and soul (character, virtue, moral conformity). For Schuon, virtue is "the initial form of spiritual union; without it, our knowing and our willing are of no use to us." According to him, to have a virtue

is above all to be without the fault that is contrary to it, for God created us virtuous. He created us in His image; faults are superimposed. Moreover, it is not we who possess virtue, it is virtue which possesses us. [...] Virtue is like a reverberation of the Sovereign Good, in which we participate through our nature or through our will, easily or with difficulty, but always by the grace of God.

For Schuon, humility, charity and veracity, that is to say effacement of the ego, gift of self and attachment to truth, are essential virtues, corresponding to the three stages of the spiritual path: purification, expansion and union. Moreover, the sense of our littleness, the sense of the sacred and piety are indispensable conditions for the blossoming of the virtues. Summarizing the author, James Cutsinger notes that perfect virtues coincide with metaphysical truths; they realize these truths existentially. In other words, as Schuon states: "truth is necessary for the perfection of virtue, just as virtue is necessary for the perfection of truth".

==== Beauty ====
Although Schuon considers that the foundations of any spiritual path are truth, prayer and virtue, (Note: "Esoterism, with its three dimensions of metaphysical discernment, mystical concentration and moral conformity, contains in the final analysis the only things that Heaven demands in an absolute fashion, all other demands being relative and therefore more or less conditional." Schuon, In the Face of the Absolute, World Wisdom, 1989, p. 36) he also insists upon the importance of a fourth element: beauty. For him, the interiorization of beauty presupposes nobility of character and at the same time produces it. Its function "is to actualize in the intelligent and sensitive creature the recollection of essences, and thus to open the way to the luminous Night of the one and infinite Essence".

To the awareness of divine beauty must correspond not only inner beauty, that is to say virtues, but also the sense of outer beauty, whether in the contemplation of nature or in artistic sensibility, without forgetting the interiorizing role of a traditional home ambiance made of beauty and serenity, foreign to the whims of modernity. "Beauty, whatever use man may make of it, belongs fundamentally to its Creator, Who thereby projects into the world of appearances something of His Being." For Schuon, these considerations find their source and justification in the theomorphic nature of man, a changeless, non-evolutive nature, contrary to what modern science may think.

=== Developments ===
==== Criticism of modernism ====
Summarizing Schuon's thought, Seyyed Hossein Nasr states that it was in Europe, during the Renaissance, that the "modernist" or reductionist vision of the human condition and the universe took shape, before it affected the other continents a few centuries later. By reducing man more and more to his rational and animal aspects, to the detriment of his spiritual dimension and the purpose of earthly life, modernism has influenced philosophy as much as religion, science or art. According to Schuon, its main characteristics are rationalism, which denies the possibility of a supra-rational knowledge, materialism, according to which only matter gives meaning to life, psychologism, which reduces the spiritual and the intellectual to the psychic, skepticism, relativism, existentialism, individualism, progressivism, evolutionism, scientism and empiricism, without forgetting agnosticism and atheism.

Regarding modern science, in spite of the scale of its discoveries on the physical plane, Schuon reproaches it for being "a totalitarian rationalism, which eliminates both Revelation and Intellect, and at the same time a totalitarian materialism, which ignores the metaphysical relativity of matter and the world; it does not know that the supra-sensible, which is beyond space and time, is the concrete principle of the world, and that it is consequently also at the origin of that contingent and changeable coagulation called 'matter'". Thus, still according to Schuon, the contradiction of scientism is to "want to give an account of reality without the help of this initial science that is metaphysics, thus ignoring that only the science of the Absolute gives meaning and discipline to the science of the relative". This conception of a universe which ignores as much the principle of "creative emanationism" as much as that of the "hierarchy of the invisible worlds", has engendered "that most typical offspring of the modern spirit", the theory of evolution, with its corollary: the illusion of "human progress". (Note: "The origin of a creature is not a material substance, it is a perfect and non-material archetype: perfect and consequently without any need of a transforming evolution; non-material and consequently having its origin in the Spirit, and not in matter. Assuredly, there is a trajectory; this starts not from an inert and unconscious substance, but proceeds from the Spirit — the matrix of all possibilities — to the earthly result, the creature; a result which sprang forth from the invisible at a cyclic moment when the physical world was still far less separate from the psychic world than in later and progressively 'hardened' periods." Schuon, From the Divine to the Human, World Wisdom, 1982, p. 16)

Schuon's criticism extends to philosophy – "the love of wisdom" – which was originally the fact of "thinking according to the immanent Intellect and not by reason alone". It "is the science of all fundamental principles". It operates with intellectual intuition – intellection – "which perceives, and not with reason alone, which concludes", hence the abyss that separates the certainty of the sage from the opinion of the modern philosopher. (Note: "We live in a scene-shifter's world in which it has become almost impossible to make contact with the primordial realities of things; prejudices and reflexes dictated by an irreversible slide intervene at every step; it is as if before the Renaissance or the Age of Enlightenment man had not been wholly man, or as if in order to be man it were necessary to have passed by way of Descartes, Voltaire, Rousseau, Kant, Marx, Darwin, and Freud, not forgetting – most recent of all – the lethal Teilhard de Chardin." Schuon, Light on the Ancient Worlds, World Wisdom, 2006, pp. 106–107)

For Schuon, there are ultimately only two possibilities: "integral, spiritual civilization, implying abuses and superstitions, and fragmentary, materialistic, progressivist civilization, implying – quite provisionally – certain earthly advantages, but excluding that which constitutes the sufficient reason and final end of all human existence".

==== Sacred art ====
Along with Ananda Coomaraswamy and Titus Burckhardt, Frithjof Schuon holds that "sacred art is first of all the visible and audible form of Revelation and then also its indispensable liturgical vesture". This art communicates "on the one hand, spiritual truths and, on the other hand, a celestial presence". James Cutsinger emphasizes that, for Schuon, an art is sacred "not through the personal aims of the artist, but through its content, its symbolism, and its style, that is, through objective elements", which must respect the canonical rules specific to the religion of its author. The latter, according to Martyn Amugen quoting Schuon, must be "sanctified or in a state of grace" because the language of the sacred "cannot spring simply from profane tastes, nor from genius, but must proceed essentially out of religion", which "cannot be replaced, far less can it be surpassed, by human resources". (Note: "A sacred work of art has a fragrance of infinity, an imprint of the absolute. In it individual talent is disciplined; it blends with the creative function of the tradition as a whole; this cannot be replaced, far less can it be surpassed, by human resources." Schuon, Spiritual Perspectives and Human Facts, World Wisdom, 2007, p. 36) Icon painters, for example, "were monks who, before setting to work, prepared themselves by fasting, prayer, confession, and communion", (Note: "... it even happened that the colours were mixed with holy water and the dust from relics, as would not have been possible had the icon not possessed a really sacramental character." Schuon, The Transcendent Unity of Religions, Quest Books, 1993, p. 77) in order to overcome the two pitfalls that threaten every artist: "a virtuosity tending towards the outward and the superficial, and a conventionalism without intelligence and without soul".

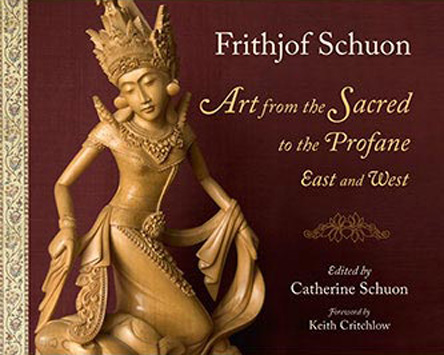
Cover of an illustrated anthology of Schuon's writings on art, edited by his wife: Art from the Sacred to the Profane, East and West

Evoking the transition from the Middle Ages – with its Byzantine, Romanesque and primitive Gothic arts – to the Renaissance, Schuon states that "Christian art, which formerly was sacred, symbolical, spiritual", gave way to the advent of neo-classical art, with its naturalistic and sentimental character, which only responded "to collective psychic aspirations". (Note: "...it is thus as far removed as can be from intellectual contemplation and takes into consideration sentimentality only; on the other hand, sentimentality itself becomes degraded in proportion as it fulfils the needs of the masses, until it finishes up in a sickly sweet and pathetic vulgarity. It is strange that no one has understood to what a degree this barbarism of forms, which reached a zenith of empty and miserable boastfulness in the period of Louis XV, contributed — and still contributes — to driving many souls (and by no means the least) away from the Church; they feel literally suffocated in surroundings which do not allow their intelligence room to breathe." Schuon, The Transcendent Unity of Religions, Quest Books, 1993, p. 63) Amugen, referring to Schuon, reports that art, having broken with tradition, became "human, individualistic, and therefore arbitrary", infallible signs of decline, and any desire to restore its sacred character must necessarily involve abandoning individualistic relativism in order to go back to its sources, which lie in the timeless and the immutable.

==== Sacred nudity ====
Author of a study on human theomorphism in Schuon's oeuvre, Timothy Scott notes this initial comment by Schuon: "The distinction between the Absolute and the Infinite expresses the two fundamental aspects of the Real, that of essentiality and that of potentiality; this is the highest principial prefiguration of the masculine and feminine poles". Schuon sees in the human body a "message of ascending and unitive verticality [...]; in rigorous, transcendent, objective, abstract, rational and mathematical mode" in man, "and in gentle, immanent, concrete, emotional and musical mode" in woman. As Patrick Laude states, feminine beauty "plays a preponderant role in the spiritual alchemy that issues from the oeuvre and spiritual personality of Schuon". This role answers to "the highest expressions of gnostic Sufism", as evidenced by "Ibn Arabī and Rūzbehān among many others".

Summarizing Schuon, Scott states that nudity represents the norm – primordial man was naked, primitive peoples are also naked – and that it "symbolizes quintessential esoterism [...], the Truth unveiled", the ordinary garment then representing exoterism. In his biography of Schuon, after noting the convergences of views that unite Schuon, Rūzbehān, Omar Khayyam, and Henri Corbin regarding the spiritual significance of nudity, Jean-Baptiste Aymard quotes this excerpt from a letter by Schuon: "Given the spiritual degeneration of humanity, the highest possible degree of beauty, which belongs to the human body, could not play a part in ordinary piety; however this theophany may be a support in esoteric spirituality, and this is shown in the sacred art of the Hindus and the Buddhists. Nakedness signifies inwardness, essentiality, primordiality and consequently universality [...]; the body is the form of the Essence and thus the essence of form".

In an interview published in 1996 by the American magazine The Quest: Philosophy, Science, Religion, The Arts, Schuon develops the sacredness of nudity:

In an altogether general way, nudity expresses – and virtually actualizes – a return to the essence, the origin, the archetype, thus to the celestial state: "And it is for this that, naked, I dance", as Lallā Yogishvarī, the Kashmiri mystic, said after having found the Divine Self in her heart. To be sure, in nudity there is a de facto ambiguity because of the passional nature of man; but there is not only the passional nature, there is also the gift of contemplativity, which can neutralize this, as is precisely the case with "sacred nudity". Thus there is not only the seduction of appearances, there is also the metaphysical transparency of phenomena which permits us to perceive the archetypal essence through the sensory experience. When the saintly bishop Nonnos beheld St. Pelagia entering the baptismal pool naked, he praised God that He had not put into human beauty just a cause of downfall, but also an opportunity for elevation towards God.

In a published passage from his largely unpublished Memoirs, Schuon remarks "how contemptible is the neo-pagan and atheistic cult of the body and of nudity. What is in itself noble in nature is good for us only in its function as a support for the supernatural; cultivated apart from God, it readily loses its nobility and becomes a humiliating fatuity, as the stupidity and ugliness of worldly nudism precisely prove".

== Legacy ==
Schuon's works have had a significant impact on the Western academic study of Sufism, through their influence on Huston Smith, Seyyed Hossein Nasr and other scholars.

== Works ==
=== Philosophy (translated from French) ===
- The Transcendent Unity of Religions, Faber & Faber, 1953; revised edition, Harper & Row, 1975; introduction by Huston Smith, Quest Books, 1984, 1993
- Spiritual Perspectives and Human Facts, Faber & Faber, 1954; Perennial Books, 1969; new translation, Perennial Books, 1987; new translation with selected letters, World Wisdom, 2007
- Gnosis: Divine Wisdom, Perennial Books, 1959, 1978; revised, Perennial Books 1990; new translation with selected letters, World Wisdom, 2006
- Language of the Self: Essays on the Perennial Philosophy, introduction by Venkataraman Raghavan, Ganesh Madras, 1959; Select Books Bangalore, 1998; revised and augmented, World Wisdom, 1999
- Stations of Wisdom, John Murray, 1961; Perennial Books, 1980; new translation, World Wisdom, 1995, 2003
- Understanding Islam, Allen & Unwin, Penguin, Unwin Hyman, Routledge, 1963, 1964, 1965, 1972, 1976, 1979, 1981, 1986, 1989, 1993; World Wisdom, 1994, 1998, 2003; new translation with selected letters, foreword by Annemarie Schimmel, World Wisdom, 2011
- Light on the Ancient Worlds, Perennial Books, 1965; World Wisdom, 1984; new translation with selected letters, World Wisdom, 2006
- Logic and Transcendence, Harper & Row, 1975; Perennial Books, 1984; new translation with selected letters, World Wisdom, 2009
- Esoterism as Principle and as Way, Perennial Books, 1981, 1990; new translation with selected letters, World Wisdom, 2019
- Sufism, Veil and Quintessence, World Wisdom, 1981; new translation with selected letters, foreword by Seyyed Hossein Nasr, World Wisdom, 2006
- From the Divine to the Human, World Wisdom, 1982; new translation with selected letters, World Wisdom, 2013
- Castes and Races (this book's 3 chapters are also included in Language of the Self), Perennial Books, 1982; World Wisdom, 1999
- Christianity/Islam: Perspectives on Esoteric Ecumenism, World Wisdom, 1985; new translation with selected letters, World Wisdom, 2008
- Survey of Metaphysics and Esoterism, World Wisdom, 1986, 2000
- In the Face of the Absolute, World Wisdom, 1989, 1994; new translation with selected letters, World Wisdom, 2014
- The Feathered Sun: Plains Indians in Art & Philosophy, introduction by Thomas Yellowtail, World Wisdom, 1990
- To Have a Center, World Wisdom, 1990; new translation with selected letters, World Wisdom, 2015
- Roots of the Human Condition, introduction by Patrick Laude, World Wisdom, 1991, 2002
- The Play of Masks, World Wisdom, 1992
- The Transfiguration of Man, World Wisdom, 1995
- The Eye of the Heart, foreword by Huston Smith, World Wisdom, 1997; new translation with selected letters, World Wisdom, 2021
- Form and Substance in the Religions, World Wisdom, 2002
- Primordial Meditation: Contemplating the Real, The Matheson Trust, 2015 (translated from the German)

=== Poetry ===
==== Written in English ====
- The Garland, Abodes, 1994
- Road to the Heart, World Wisdom, 1995

==== Translated from German ====
- Adastra & Stella Maris, foreword by William Stoddart, bilingual, World Wisdom, 2003
- Songs Without Names, Vol. I-VI, introduction by William Stoddart, foreword by Annemarie Schimmel, World Wisdom, 2006
- Songs Without Names, Vol. VII-XII, introduction by William Stoddart, foreword by Annemarie Schimmel, World Wisdom, 2006
- World Wheel, Vol. I-III, introduction by William Stoddart, foreword by Annemarie Schimmel, World Wisdom, 2006
- World Wheel, Vol. IV-VII, introduction by William Stoddart, foreword by Annemarie Schimmel, World Wisdom, 2006
- Autumn Leaves & The Ring, introduction by Patrick Laude, bilingual, World Wisdom, 2010

==== Written in German (no translation) ====
- Sulamith, Urs Graf, 1947
- Tage- und Nächtebuch, Urs Graf, 1947
- Liebe / Leben / Glück / Sinn, 4 vol., Herder, 1997

=== Paintings ===
- The Feathered Sun: Plains Indians in Art & Philosophy, introduction by Thomas Yellowtail, World Wisdom, 1990
- Images of Primordial & Mystic Beauty: Paintings by Frithjof Schuon, Abodes/World Wisdom, 1992

=== Anthologies of Schuon's writings ===
- Treasures of Buddhism (formerly In the Tracks of Buddhism, Allen & Unwin, 1968; Unwin Hyman, 1989); World Wisdom, 1993; new translation with selected letters, World Wisdom, 2018
- The Essential Frithjof Schuon, edited by Seyyed Hossein Nasr (formerly The Essential Writings of Frithjof Schuon, Amity House, 1986; Element Books, 1991), World Wisdom, 2005
- Echoes of Perennial Wisdom, World Wisdom, 1992; new translation with selected letters, edited by Patrick Casey, World Wisdom, 2012
- Songs for a Spiritual Traveler, selected poems, bilingual, World Wisdom, 2002
- The Fullness of God: Frithjof Schuon on Christianity, edited by James Cutsinger, foreword by Antoine Faivre, World Wisdom, 2004
- Prayer Fashions Man: Frithjof Schuon on the Spiritual Life, edited by James Cutsinger, World Wisdom, 2004
- Art from the Sacred to the Profane: East and West, edited by Catherine Schuon, foreword by Keith Critchlow, World Wisdom, 2007
- Splendor of the True: a Frithjof Schuon Reader, edited by James Cutsinger, foreword by Huston Smith, State University of New York Press, 2013
- Towards the Essential: Letters of a Spiritual Master, edited by Thierry Béguelin, The Matheson Trust, 2021
- Letters of Frithjof Schuon: Reflections on the Perennial Philosophy, edited by Michael Oren Fitzgerald, introduction by Catherine Schuon, World Wisdom, 2022

Schuon was a frequent contributor to the quarterly journal Studies in Comparative Religion (along with Guénon, Coomaraswamy, Burckhardt, Nasr, Lings, and many others) which dealt with religious symbolism and the Traditionalist perspective.

== See also ==
- Kurt Almqvist
- Jean Borella
- William Chittick
- James Cutsinger
- Michael Oren Fitzgerald
- Jean Hani
- Walter James, 4th Baron Northbourne
- Tage Lindbom
- Jean-Louis Michon
- Jacob Needleman
- Marco Pallis
- Whitall Perry
- Kathleen Raine
- Leo Schaya
- E. F. Schumacher
- Philip Sherrard
- Wolfgang Smith
- William Stoddart
- Algis Uždavinys
- Michel Valsan
