= Yellowtail =

Yellowtail, yellow-tail, or Yellow Tail may refer to:

- Yellowtail (fish), any of several species of fish
- Yellow-tail, a Eurasian moth species
- Yellowtail moth, a South American moth species
- Yellow Tail (wine), an Australian wine producer
- Yellow Tail Records, a record label
- Yellowtail cribo, a snake species

== People with the surname ==
- Robert Yellowtail (1889–1988), Crow Nation leader
- Susie Walking Bear Yellowtail (1903–1981), Crow nurse
- Thomas Yellowtail (1903–1993), Crow sun dance chief and medicine man
