= Michel Valsan =

Romanian Muslim scholar (1907–1974)

Michel Valsan (Romanian: Mihai Vâlsan; 1 February 1907, Brăila, Kingdom of Romania – 26 November 1974, Antony, Hauts-de-Seine) was a Muslim scholar and master of a Shadhiliyya tariqa in Paris under the name Shaykh Mustafa 'Abd al-'Aziz. Intellectually a Traditionalist, Valsan "modified Schuonian Traditionalism in the direction of extreme orthodoxy". He was also a Romanian diplomat and a prolific translator who specialized in translating and interpreting the works of the Sufi theoretician Ibn Arabi.

== Life and work ==
Valsan studied under the Romanian fascist Mircea Eliade in the early 1930s, and would go on to meet with Eliade in 1948. A follower of René Guénon, Valsan considered Hinduism, Taoism and Islam as "the three main forms of the present traditional world, representing the Middle-East, the Far-East, and the Near-East, as reflections of the three aspects of the Lord of the World." Voicing a Perennialist conception of religiosity, he stated:

The Islamic doctrine is formal on the point that all the Divine Messengers have brought essentially the same message and that all the traditions are in essence one... As regards the Islamic form of the tradition this is in any case originally and essentially based on the doctrine of Supreme Identity...

Valsan learned Arabic to a high degree of proficiency. He introduced the study of Islamic esoteric doctrine, in particular that of Ibn Arabi and his school, into the context of the "traditional studies" based around Guénon's work, of which he was a firm defender. Building on Guénon's writings, he believed that traditional doctrines had to be restored and that this could only be done by "incarnating" them in the context of a full-fledged religious movement. This led him to found the Alawiyya Sufi order in Bucharest and later Paris, initially inspired by Frithjof Schuon's Maryamiyya Order. Although a disciple of Schuon at first, Valsan gradually distanced himself from the latter's idiosyncratic approach to rituals. He explicitly broke with Schuon in 1950, receiving the backing of Guénon.

Valsan served as the director and editor of, and regular contributor to, the journal Études traditionnelles from 1960 until his death in 1974. According to Mark Sedgwick, under Valsan's editorship, the journal "developed a marked Islamic emphasis, but it continued to publish on other religions". Valsan died in Paris, France at the age of 63. A collection of his articles was republished in a posthumous compendium entitled L'Islam et la Fonction de René Guénon (Editions de l'Oeuvre, Paris).

Valsan fathered two sons, Ahmad and Muhammad, the latter of whom became the leader of a Sufi order that succeeded his father's.
