= James Cutsinger =

American author (1953–2020)

- Born: May 4, 1953
- Died: February 19, 2020 (aged 66)
- Title: Professor of Theology and Religious Thought

Academic work
- Discipline: Religious studies
- Institutions: University of South Carolina

James Sherman Cutsinger (May 4, 1953 – February 19, 2020) was an author, editor, and professor of religious studies (emeritus) at the University of South Carolina, whose works focused primarily on comparative religion, the modern Traditionalist School of perennial philosophy, Eastern Christian spirituality, and the mystical tradition of the Eastern Orthodox Church.

== Early and personal life ==
Cutsinger earned his bachelor's degree in Political Theory, Russian Language and Literature at Cornell College in 1975 and his doctorate in Theology and Religious Thought at Harvard University in 1980.

Cutsinger died on February 19, 2020.

== Career ==
=== Traditionalism ===
Cutsinger served as secretary to the Foundation for Traditional Studies and was a widely recognized authority on the Sophia Perennis, the traditionalist school, and comparative religion – subjects on which he wrote extensively. His works also focused on the theology and spirituality of the Christian East. He is perhaps best known however, for his work on Swiss philosopher and traditionalist, Frithjof Schuon.

=== Teaching ===
Cutsinger was a professor of Theology and Religious Thought at the University of South Carolina and an advocate of Socratic Teaching. The recipient of three University of South Carolina Mortar Board Excellence in Teaching awards, he was also named a Distinguished Honors Professor and was selected as one of his university's Michael J. Mungo Teachers of the Year (2011). He also served as director of three National Endowment for the Humanities Summer Seminars.

== Bibliography ==
=== Books ===
- The Form of Transformed Vision: Coleridge and the Knowledge of God. Mercer University Press. 1987. ISBN 978-0-86554-280-8.; Foreword by Owen Barfield
- Advice to the Serious Seeker: Meditations on the Teaching of Frithjof Schuon. SUNY Press. 1997-04-25. ISBN 978-0-7914-3250-1.
- Reclaiming the Great Tradition: Evangelicals, Catholics, and Orthodox in Dialogue, ed. (InterVarsity Press, 1997)
- Paths to the Heart: Sufism and the Christian East. World Wisdom. 2002. ISBN 978-0-941532-43-3.
- Not of This World: A Treasury of Christian Mysticism (World Wisdom, 2003)
- The Fullness of God: Frithjof Schuon on Christianity (World Wisdom, 2004)
- Prayer Fashions Man: Frithjof Schuon on the Spiritual Life (World Wisdom, 2005)

=== Translations of works by Frithjof Schuon ===
- Gnosis: Divine Wisdom. World Wisdom. 2006.
- Sufism: Veil and Quintessence. World Wisdom. 2006.
- Spiritual Perspectives and Human Facts (World Wisdom, 2007)
- Christianity/Islam: Perspectives on Esoteric Ecumenism (World Wisdom, 2008)
- Logic and Transcendence (World Wisdom, 2009)
- Splendor of the True: A Frithjof Schuon Reader. SUNY Press. 2013-05-01. ISBN 978-1-4384-4611-0.

=== Chapters ===
- Cutsinger, James S. (1986). "Inside without Outside: Coleridge, the Form of the One, and God". In Jasper, David (ed.). The Interpretation of Belief: Coleridge, Schleiermacher and Romanticism. London: Palgrave Macmillan UK. pp. 66–80. doi:10.1007/978-1-349-18333-3_4. ISBN 978-1-349-18333-3.
- Cutsinger, James S. (2010). "Disagreeing to Agree: A Christian Response to "A Common Word"". In El-Ansary, Waleed; Linnan, David K. (eds.). Muslim and Christian Understanding: Theory and Application of "A Common Word". New York: Palgrave Macmillan US. pp. 111–130. doi:10.1057/9780230114401_10. ISBN 978-0-230-11440-1.

=== Selected articles ===
- Cutsinger, James S. (January 1983). "Coleridgean Polarity and Theological Vision". Harvard Theological Review. 76 (1): 91–108. doi:10.1017/S0017816000018484. ISSN 1475-4517.
- "Toward a Method of Knowing Spirit". Studies in Religion/Sciences Religieuses. 14 (2). 1985.
- "Femininity, Hierarchy, and God", Religion of the Heart: Essays Presented to Frithjof Schuon, ed. Nasr and Stoddart (Foundation for Traditional Studies, 1991)
- "Listening More Closely to Schuon", ARIES: Association pour la Recherche de l'Information sur l'Esoterisme, 14 (1992)
- Cutsinger, James S. (1992). "A Knowledge That Wounds Our Nature: The Message of Frithjof Schuon". Journal of the American Academy of Religion. 60 (3): 465–491. doi:10.1093/jaarel/LX.3.465. ISSN 0002-7189. JSTOR 1465286.
- "The Mystery of the Two Natures", Sophia: Journal of Traditional Studies, 4:2 (1998) - also published as "Le Mystère des Deux Natures", Connaissance des Religions (Numero Hors Serie, 1999)
- "On Earth as It Is in Heaven: A Metaphysical Cosmogony", Sacred Web: A Journal of Tradition and Modernity, 1:1 (1998)
- "The Virgin". Sophia: Journal of Traditional Studies. 6 (2). 2000.

== See also ==
- Christianity and other religions
- Christian mysticism
- Christian philosophy
- Ecumenism and interfaith dialogue
- Esoteric Christianity
- Orthodox Christian theology
- Philosophy of religion
- Samuel Taylor Coleridge
