= Martin Lings =

English Islamic scholar and philosopher (1909–2005)

Shaykh Martin Lings
- Abū Bakr Sirāj al-Dīn
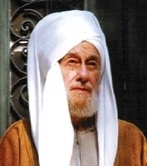
- Lings in 2001

Personal life
- Born: 24 January 1909 Burnage, Manchester, England
- Died: 12 May 2005 (aged 96) Westerham, Kent, England
- Era: Modern era
- Notable work: Muhammad: His Life Based on the Earliest Sources
- Education: Clifton College; Magdalen College, Oxford; School of Oriental and African Studies
- Occupation: Islamic scholar, author, Shakespearean scholar

Religious life
- Religion: Islam
- Tariqa: Shadhili
- Creed: Sunni
- Movement: Traditionalist School
- Spouse: Lesley Smalley (m. 1944)

Martin Lings (24 January 1909 – 12 May 2005), also known as Abū Bakr Sirāj ad-Dīn, was an English writer, Islamic scholar, and philosopher. A student of the Swiss metaphysician Frithjof Schuon and an authority on the work of William Shakespeare, he is best known as the author of Muhammad: His Life Based on the Earliest Sources.

== Early life and education ==
Lings was born in Burnage, Manchester, on 24 January 1909. He was raised in a Protestant family, but he later became an atheist. He began travelling at a young age, spending significant time in the United States because of his father's employment. He attended Clifton College and went on to Magdalen College, Oxford, where he gained a BA in English Language and Literature. At Magdalen, he was a student and then a close friend of C. S. Lewis. After graduating from Oxford Lings went to Vytautas Magnus University, in Lithuania, where he taught Anglo-Saxon and Middle English.

At Oxford he discovered the writings of René Guénon, a French metaphysician and Muslim convert, and Frithjof Schuon, a German spiritual authority, metaphysician and Perennialist. In 1938, Lings went to Basel to meet Schuon and embraced the branch of the Alawiyya tariqa led by Schuon. Lings remained Schuon's disciple and expositor for the rest of his life.

== Career ==
In 1939, Lings went to Cairo, Egypt, to visit a friend who was an assistant of René Guénon. Soon after arriving in Cairo, his friend died and Lings began studying Arabic. Cairo became his home for over a decade; he became an English language teacher at the University of Cairo and produced Shakespeare plays annually. Lings married Lesley Smalley in 1944 and lived with her in a village near the pyramids. Despite having settled comfortably in Egypt, Lings was forced to leave in 1952 after anti-British disturbances.

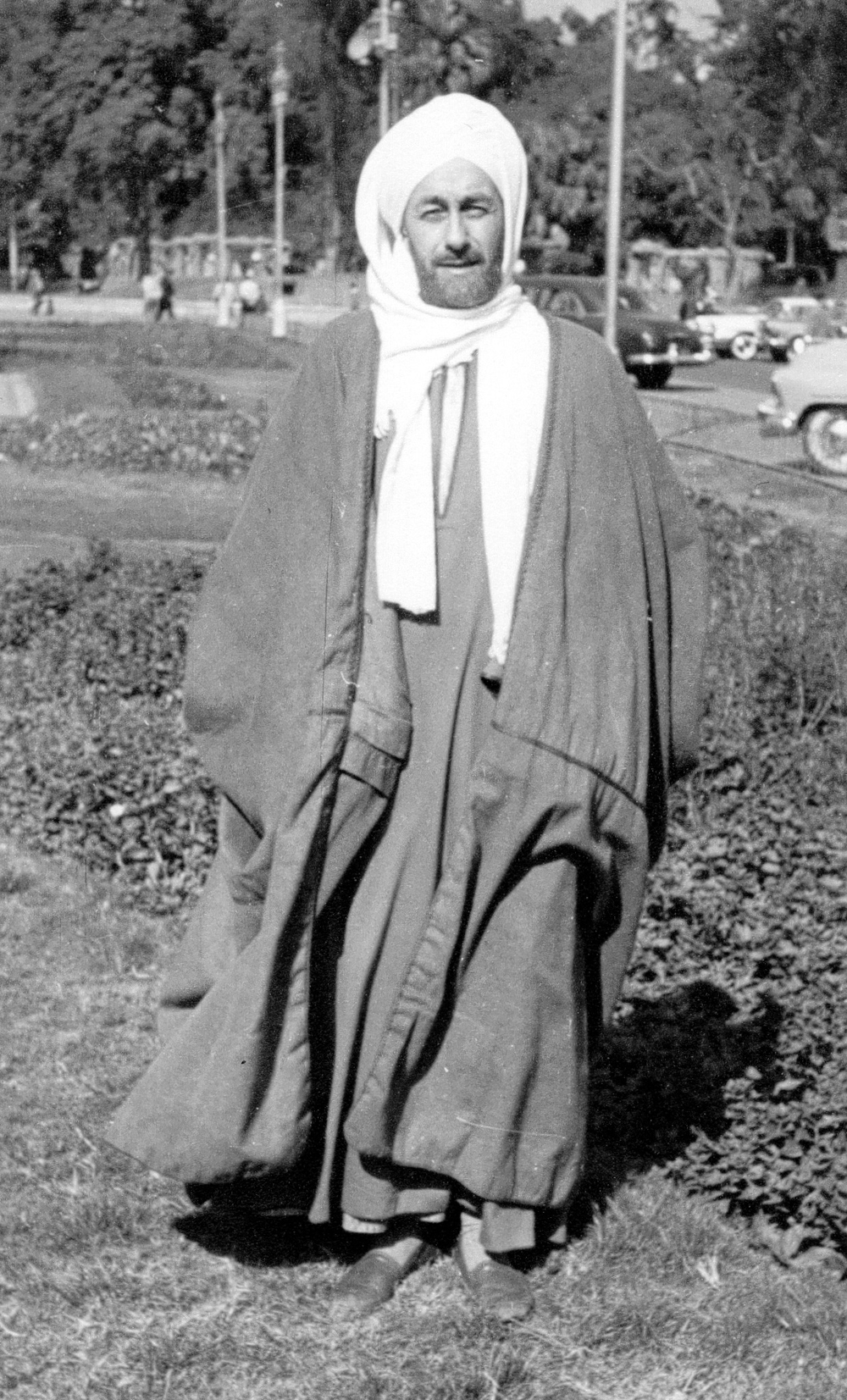
Lings in 1948.

On returning to the United Kingdom he continued his education, earning a BA in Arabic and a PhD from the School of Oriental and African Studies (University of London). His doctoral thesis became a book on Algerian Sufi Ahmad al-Alawi. After completing his doctorate in 1959, Lings worked at the British Museum and later the British Library, overseeing eastern manuscripts and other textual works, rising to the position of Keeper of Oriental Printed Books and Manuscripts 1970–73. He was also a frequent contributor to the journal Studies in Comparative Religion.

A writer throughout this period, Lings's output increased in the last quarter of his life. While his thesis work on Ahmad al-Alawi had been well regarded, his most famous work was a biography of Muhammad, written in 1983, which earned him acclaim in the Muslim world and prizes from the governments of Pakistan and Egypt. His work was hailed as the "best biography of the prophet in English" at the National Seerat Conference in Islamabad. He also continued travelling extensively, although he made his home in Kent. He died on 12 May 2005.

Lings and a Salafist scholar named Abu Bilal Mustafa al-Kanadi had a public debate about some accounts of Lings's biography of Islamic prophet Muhammad. The exchange was published by Saudi Gazette.

His contribution to Shakespeare scholarship was to point out the deeper esoteric meanings found in Shakespeare's plays, and the spirituality of Shakespeare himself. More recent editions of Lings's books on Shakespeare include a foreword by Charles III. Just before his death he gave an interview on this topic, which was posthumously made into the film Shakespeare's Spirituality: A Perspective. An Interview With Dr. Martin Lings.

== Books ==
- The Underlying Religion (World Wisdom, 2007) ISBN 978-1-933316-43-7
- Splendors of Qur'an Calligraphy And Illumination (2005), Thesaurus Islamicus Foundation, Thames & Hudson, ISBN 0-500-97648-1
- A Return to the Spirit : Questions and Answers (2005), Fons Vitae Publishing, ISBN 1-887752-74-9
- Sufi Poems : A Mediaeval Anthology (2005), Islamic Texts Society, ISBN 1-903682-18-5
- Mecca: From Before Genesis Until Now (2004), Archetype, ISBN 1-901383-07-5
- The Eleventh Hour: the Spiritual Crisis of the Modern World in the Light of Tradition and Prophecy (2002), Archetype, ISBN 1-901383-01-6
- Collected Poems, revised and expanded (2002), Archetype, ISBN 1-901383-03-2
- Ancient Beliefs and Modern Superstitions (2001), Archetype, ISBN 1-901383-02-4
- What is Sufism (Islamic Texts Society, 1999) ISBN 978-0-946621-41-5
- The Secret of Shakespeare : His Greatest Plays seen in the Light of Sacred Art (1998), Quinta Essentia, distributed by Archetype, (hb), ISBN 1-870196-15-5
- Sacred Art of Shakespeare : To Take Upon Us the Mystery of Things (Inner Traditions, 1998) 0892817178
- A Sufi saint of the twentieth century: Shaikh Ahmad al-°Alawi, his spiritual heritage and legacy (Islamic Texts Society, 1993) ISBN 0-946621-50-0
- Symbol & Archetype : A Study of the Meaning of Existence (1991, 2006), Fons Vitae, Quinta Essentia series, ISBN 1-870196-05-8
- Muhammad: His Life Based on the Earliest Sources (Islamic Texts Society, 1983) ISBN 978-0-946621-33-0 (World-UK edn) / ISBN 978-1-59477-153-8 (US edn)
- The Quranic Art of Calligraphy and Illumination (World of Islam Festival Trust, 1976) ISBN 0-905035-01-1
- The Heralds, and other Poems 1970
- The Elements, and Other Poems (1967), Perennial Books
- The Book of Certainty: The Sufi Doctrine of Faith, Wisdom and Gnosis signed as Abu Bakr Siraj ad-Din. Cambridge, Islamic Texts Society, 1992 (1st ed. 1952).

== See also ==
- Jean-Louis Michon
- Leo Schaya
- Sufism
- Tage Lindbom
- Kurt Almqvist
- Ivan Aguéli
- Seyyed Hossein Nasr
- The Matheson Trust
- Titus Burckhardt
- William Stoddart

== Sources ==
- Sedgwick, Mark (2004). Against the Modern World: Traditionalism and the Secret Intellectual History of the Twentieth Century. Oxford University Press. ISBN 9780199744930.
