= Susie Walking Bear Yellowtail =

American nurse (1903–1981)

- Born: Susie Walking Bear; January 27, 1903 near Pryor, Montana
- Died: December 25, 1981 (aged 78); Wyola, Montana
- Burial place: Lodge Grass Cemetery, Big Horn County, Montana
- Citizenship: American
- Occupation: nurse
- Years active: 1927-1979
- Known for: First Crow registered nurse in the U.S.
- Spouse: Thomas Yellowtail

Susie Walking Bear Yellowtail (1903–1981) (Crow-Sioux) was the first Crow and one of the first Native Americans to graduate as a registered nurse in the United States. Working for the Indian Health Service, she brought modern health care to her people and traveled throughout the U.S. to assess care given to indigenous people for the Public Health Service. Yellowtail served on many national health organizations and received many honors for her work, including the President's Award for Outstanding Nursing Health Care in 1962 and being honored in 1978 as the "Grandmother of American Indian Nurses" by the American Indian Nurses Association. She was inducted into the Montana Hall of Fame in 1987 and in 2002 became the first Native American inductee of the American Nurses Association Hall of Fame.

== Early life ==
Susie Walking Bear was born on January 27, 1903, on the Crow Indian Reservation near Pryor, Montana, to native parents. Her mother, Kills the Enemy or Jane White Horse was Oglala Sioux and her father, Walking Bear, was Apsáalooke Crow. Walking Bear's father died prior to her birth and her mother remarried Stone Breast. Raised by her mother and stepfather, she began school at the Catholic Mission in Pryor at age eight, but was orphaned when she was twelve and sent to the Indian Boarding School in Lodge Grass, Montana. In 1919, she accompanied a missionary, Francis Shaw, to Denver, for a Baptist convention, and though she had been promised she could return to the Crow school, she was sightseeing when her group returned to Montana. Shaw suggested that Walking Bear accompany her to Muskogee, Oklahoma, and continue her schooling at Bacone Indian School. When Walking Bear completed her eighth grade studies, Shaw, then Mrs. Clifford Field, brought her to Northfield, Massachusetts and paid the tuition for Walking Bear to attend Northfield Seminary. Walking Bear worked as a nanny and maid while attending school to be able to pay her own room and board.

The arduous schedule, cultural intolerance by the school administration which insisted she use the surname of "Bear", and suspicion of her employers was difficult for Walking Bear. In 1923, she applied to work at the Tall Pines Girl's Camp in Bennington, New Hampshire, planning on leaving Northfield permanently. She was accepted at the Franklin County Public Hospital in Greenfield, Massachusetts, in 1924 to study nursing with Dr. Halbert G. Stetson and completed her internship at Boston General Hospital. Graduating in 1927, Walking Bear became the first registered nurse of Crow descent and one of the first Native American nurses graduated in the United States, though Elizabeth Sadoques Mason a full-blooded Abenaki and her sister Maude, obtained registration in New York State before Yellowtail. Elizabeth obtained her RN certificate in 1919, while Maude became a nurse probably in 1914. and Nancy Cornelius (later Skenandore) of the Oneida Nation of Wisconsin graduated from the Hartford Training School for Nurses in 1890. Lula Owl Gloyne of the Eastern Band Cherokee Indian tribe graduated from Chestnut Hill Hospital School of Nursing in Philadelphia in 1916 and passed the registration exam in Pennsylvania the same year. She was a 1st Lieutenant in the US Army in WWI.

== Career ==
Graduating in September 1927, she returned briefly to the Public Hospital in Greenfield before taking a position in a private nursing facility in Oklahoma. Later she did home health nursing among the Chippewa of Minnesota, before returning to the Crow reservation. In 1929, Walking Bear married Thomas Yellowtail, who would become a spiritual leader in their tribe. Her first assignment in Montana was at the Indian Health Service's Hospital at the Crow Agency. For two years, she worked on the reservation to modernize the health services offered to her tribe and fight the forced sterilization of Native American women.

Between 1930 and 1960, Yellowtail served as a consultant, traveling throughout the country and documenting problems in the Indian Health Service (IHS), like inadequate numbers of facilities, inability of non-native nurses to speak with their patients from a culturally sensitive perspective or in their native language, unsanitary living conditions, barriers to help from traditional healers, health care only being available from IHS to Indians living on reservations and many other concerns. Bureaucrats in Washington were aware of the failures of the IHS and from the early 1940s relied on Yellowtail's assessments of both the needs and challenges of the system. She served on an advisory committee for the Division of Indian Health (DIH) to assist sanitation engineers in relaying to tribal members the importance of hygiene and sanitation in combating disease. DIH projects provided water supply, sewage disposal and garbage disposal for homes and it was the committee member's job to interface with homeowners and explain the importance of maintaining the systems as well as the benefits of them.

During this time, Yellowtail was also active with several cultural events. She was a dancer in a troupe, the Crow Indian Ceremonial Dancers, led by Donald Deernose. Other members, besides Yellowtail and her husband and Deernose and his wife Agnes, were Lloyd Littlehawk, Henry and Stella Old Coyote, Henry Rides the Horse, and Fred Two Warriors. The group began a European tour in 1953, performing in Algeria, Denmark, England, Holland, Israel, Luxembourg, Morocco, and Turkey. Yellowtail and the other dancers toured in Belgium, Finland, France, Italy, Norway, Spain and Sweden and spent an entire month in Paris performing to sold-out houses in 1954. Returning from the tour in 1955, the troupe performed at a benefit of the Montana Institute of the Arts for the Montana Historical Society. Yellowtail also served as the official chaperone for Miss Indian America from its inception into the 1970s.

Yellowtail was awarded the President’s Award for Outstanding Nursing by President John F. Kennedy in 1962. In 1965, she was named Mrs. American Indian at the American Indian Youth Conference held in Cambridge, Massachusetts. In 1968, she was appointed to serve a four-year term on the Public Health Service's Advisory Committee on Indian Health. In 1970, she was one of five featured speakers in a Health, Education and Welfare documentary concerning the services provided to indigenous communities by the Indian Health Service. That same year, at the All-American Indian Days festival in Sheridan, Wyoming, Yellowtail and her husband were honored as the "Outstanding Indian of the Year" for their leadership and public services to the Native American Community.

In 1972, Yellowtail was reappointed by Governor Forrest H. Anderson to serve on the State Advisory Council for Vocational Education. She stressed the need for native education so that Indians could compete for jobs. She also voiced concern that native people needed to train for service sector jobs, like lawyers, doctors, nurses, and teachers so that children and adults had access to help from people who understood their culture. Yellowtail also served on the National Alcohol and Drug Abuse Committee and was appointed by President Richard Nixon to serve on the Council on Indian Health, Education and Welfare and the federal Indian Health Advisory Committee. She founded the first professional association of Native American nurses and in 1978, was honored by the American Indian Nurses Association as the "Grandmother of American Indian Nurses".

Yellowtail died on Christmas Day, 1981 at her home in Wyola, Montana. Posthumously, in 1987 she was inducted into the Montana Hall of Fame and in 2002 to the American Nurses Association Hall of Fame as the first Native American inductee.
