= Joseph Epes Brown =

American scholar (1920 – 2000)

Personal life
- Born: September 9, 1920 Ridgefield, Connecticut
- Died: September 19, 2000 (aged 80) Stevensville, Montana

Religious life
- Religion: Christianity

Joseph Epes Brown (September 9, 1920 – September 19, 2000) was an American scholar whose lifelong dedication to Native American traditions helped to bring the study of American Indian religious traditions into higher education. His seminal work was a book entitled, The Sacred Pipe, an account of his discussions with the Lakota holy man, Black Elk, regarding the religious rites of his people.

== Biography ==
Born in Ridgefield, Connecticut on September 9, 1920, Brown studied at Haverford College where he received his undergraduate degree. He went on to study at Stanford University and the Stockholm University, earning an M.A. in anthropology and a Ph.D. in history of religions.

Brown’s keen interest in the traditions of Native Americans led him to seek out Black Elk, who had already told his life story in the book, Black Elk Speaks. In 1947, three years before Black Elk's death, Brown lived with the Lakota Sioux holy man for a year while recording his account of the "seven rites of the Oglala Sioux". Black Elk had requested that the book, The Sacred Pipe, be created so that the beliefs of his people could be preserved and become more fully understood by both Native Americans and the world at large.

Brown was one of the founders of the Native American Studies program at Indiana University and a founding member of the board of directors of the Foundation for Traditional Studies (est. 1984). He taught at the University of Montana, in the Department of Religious Studies, from 1972 until his retirement in 1989. He was also a frequent contributor of articles on Native American spirituality to the journal Studies in Comparative Religion.

After a long battle with Alzheimer's, he died at his home in Stevensville, Montana, on September 19, 2000, at the age of 80.

== Quotes ==
The late Joseph Brown was a legendary mentor, whose gentility and grace in person and on the page lent dignity and depth to the indigenous ways of knowledge and ceremony he passed on to others. —Peter Nabokov, Department of World Arts and Cultures, UCLA.

Joseph Brown was a person of gentle character blessed with a keen sense of the sacred wherever it might be found, first of all of course in orthodox religions themselves and secondly in the world of virgin nature and sacred art. —Seyyed Hossein Nasr.

== Bibliography ==
- The Sacred Pipe: Black Elk's Account of the Seven Rites of the Oglala Sioux, University of Oklahoma Press, 1989 (originally published in 1953)
  - The Gift of the Sacred Pipe, edited and illustrated by Vera Louise Drysdale, University of Oklahoma Press, 1995.
- Animals of the Soul, Sacred Animals of the Oglala Sioux, Element Books Ltd, 1993
- Teaching Spirits: Understanding Native American Traditions, (with Emily Cousins) Oxford University Press, 2001
- The Spiritual Legacy of the American Indian, World Wisdom; 1984; Commemorative edition, 2007

For brevity’s sake, a list of out-of-print books, as well as books in which Brown contributed chapters, are not listed here.

== See also ==
- John Neihardt
- Lame Deer
