= Leo Schaya =

Leo Schaya (1916–1985) was a Swiss author and scholar whose works focused on the Sufi tradition, the Kabbalah, and the Traditionalist School.

== Biography ==
Born in Switzerland, Schaya lived much of his adult life in Nancy, France. He grew up in a traditional Jewish household and from his early youth he was interested in the works of neo-Platonism, Sufism and Advaita Vedanta.

He published several articles on the Kabbalah. He also wrote a book on the Sufi doctrine of unity. He is the founder of the journal Connaissance des religions (Knowledge of Religions).

== Traditionalism ==
Schaya was a friend and frequent correspondent of prominent Traditionalist Frithjof Schuon.

"The essential principles of the various orthodox revelations are identical, a fact which can be discovered by metaphysical penetration of dogmas and symbols."

— Schaya on the Perennial Philosophy"

== Bibliography ==
In English

- Sufism: Love and Wisdom (World Wisdom. 2006) ISBN 978-0-941532-75-4
- The Universal Meaning of Kabbalah (Fons Vitae; Tra edition, 2004) ISBN 978-1-887752-60-2
- Seeing God Everywhere (contributed essay) (World Wisdom, 2004) ISBN 978-0-941532-42-6

In French

- L'Homme et l'Absolu selon la kabbale (Dervy, 1999) ISBN 978-2-85076-966-5
- Naissance a l'esprit (Collection "Mystiques et religions") (Dervy-Livres, 1987) ISBN 978-2-85076-044-0
- La doctrina sufí de la unidad (José J. de Olañeta, 1985) ISBN 978-84-7651-000-1
- La creation en Dieu: A la lumiere du judaisme, du christianisme et de l'islam (Dervy-Livres, 1983) ISBN 978-2-85076-162-1
- La doctrine Soufique de l'unite (Initiation a l'Islam) (A.-Maisonneuve, 1981) ISBN 978-2-7200-1003-3

== See also ==
- Traditionalist School
