= William Stoddart =

Scottish physician and perennialist writer (1925–2023)

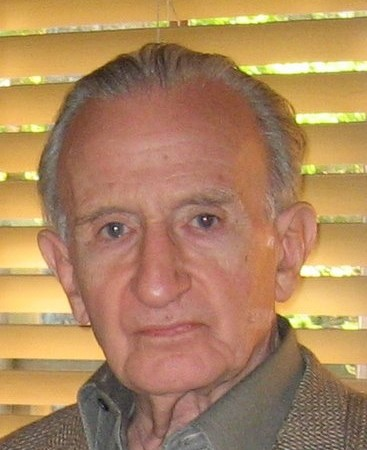
Stoddart in 2007

William Smith Stoddart (25 June 1925 – 9 November 2023) was a Scottish-Canadian physician, author and spiritual traveller, who wrote several books on the Perennial Philosophy and on comparative religion.

== Biography ==
William Smith Stoddart was born in Carstairs, Scotland on 25 June 1925. He graduated in medicine from Glasgow University.

Stoddart has been called a "master of synthesis" and was one of the important Perennialist writers. For many years he was assistant editor of the British journal Studies in Comparative Religion. He has translated into English, from the original French or German, several books of the perennialists Frithjof Schuon (1907–1998) and Titus Burckhardt (1908–1984).

Stoddart lived most of his life in London, England, before moving, in 1982, to Windsor, Ontario, Canada. He died in Windsor on 9 November 2023, at the age of 98.

== Bibliography ==
=== Books ===
==== As author ====
- Outline of Sufism: The Essentials of Islamic Spirituality (World Wisdom, 2013)
- What does Islam mean in today's world? (World Wisdom, 2012)
- Remembering in a World of Forgetting (World Wisdom, 2008)
- Invincible Wisdom (Sophia Perennis, 2007)
- Hinduism and Its Spiritual Masters (Fons Vitae, 2006)
- Outline of Buddhism (Foundation for Traditional Studies, 1998)
- Outline of Hinduism (Foundation for Traditional Studies, 1993)
- Sufism: The Mystical Doctrines and Methods of Islam (Paragon House Publishers, New York City; Revised edition, 1985, ISBN 0-913757-47-0)

==== As editor ====
- The Essential Titus Burckhardt: Reflections on Sacred Art, Faiths, and Civilizations (World Wisdom, 2003)
- Religion of the Heart: Essays Presented to Frithjof Schuon on His Eightieth Birthday (Foundation for Traditional Studies, 1991) – co-published with Seyyed Hossein Nasr

==== As translator ====
- Frithjof Schuon, Esoterism as Principle and as Way (Perennial Books, 1981)
- Frithjof Schuon, Sufism: Veil and Quintessence (World Wisdom, 1981)

=== Articles ===
- Frithjof Schuon and the Perennialist School
- Religious and Ethnic Conflict
- Rama Coomaraswamy: between Perennialism and Catholicism (in collaboration with Mateus Soares de Azevedo)
- Religion and Anti-Religion in Eastern Europe
- The Role of Culture in Education
- Right Hand of Truth: Life and Work of Titus Burckhardt
- Aspects of Islamic Esoterism

== See also ==
- Perennial Philosophy
- Traditionalist School
- Frithjof Schuon
- René Guénon
- Titus Burckhardt
- Ananda Coomaraswamy
- Martin Lings
- Seyyed Hossein Nasr
- Sufism
- Angus Macnab
- Bernard Philip Kelly
- Whitall Perry
