= Patrick Laude =

French scholar and author

Patrick Laude is a scholar, author and teacher. His works deals with the relationship between mysticism, symbolism and poetry, as well as focusing on contemporary spiritual figures such as Simone Weil, Louis Massignon and Frithjof Schuon.

== Biography ==
Born in France in 1958, he took a graduate degree in philosophy at the University of Paris IV Sorbonne while studying at the Ecole Normale Supérieure in Paris. He came to the US in the early eighties and obtained his Ph.D. in 1985 from Indiana University. He joined Georgetown University in 1991. Laude's scholarly work is primarily focused on comparative mysticism, the symbolic imagination in religion and literature, and Western interpretations of Asian contemplative traditions. He is the author of several books and numerous articles on these subjects.

== Bibliography ==
English

- The Esoteric in Religious and Spiritual Traditions: a Comparative Study, Singapore, Springer, 2025, 310 p. ISBN 978-981965824-4
- Surrendering to the Self: Ramana Maharshi's Message for the Present, London, Hurst, 2022, 244 p. ISBN 978-178738538-2. Indian Edition: New Delhi, Fingerprint! Publishing, 2024, 360 p. ISBN 978-936214047-0
- Keys to the Beyond: Frithjof Schuon's Cross-Traditional Language of Transcendence, Albany, State University of New York Press, 2020, 394 p. ISBN 978-143847899-9
- Shimmering Mirrors: Reality and Appearance in Contemplative Metaphysics East and West, Albany, State University of New York Press, 2017, 272 p. ISBN 978-143846681-1
- Louis Massignon: The Vow and the Oath, London, The Matheson Trust, 2011, 276 p. ISBN 978-190809206-9
- Pathways to an Inner Islam: Massignon, Corbin, Guénon and Schuon, Albany, State University of New York Press, 2010, 200 p. ISBN 978-143842955-7
- Pray Without Ceasing: The Way of the Invocation in World Religions, Bloomington/IN (USA), World Wisdom, 2006, 226 p. ISBN 978-193331614-7
- Divine Play, Sacred Laughter, and Spiritual Understanding, Basingstoke (UK), Palgrave Macmillan, 2005, 296 p. ISBN 978-140397015-2
- Singing the Way: Insights into Poetry & Spiritual Transformation, Bloomington/IN (USA), World Wisdom, 2005, 232 p. ISBN 978-094153274-7
- Frithjof Schuon: Life and Teachings, in collaboration with Jean-Baptiste Aymard, Albany, State University of New York Press, 2004, 150 p. ISBN 978-079146206-5

French (not translated into English)

- L’œuvre de Frithjof Schuon : orientations et éclairages, Paris, L'Harmattan, 2026, 176 p. ISBN 978-233660129-8
- Apocalypse des religions : pathologies et dévoilements de la conscience religieuse contemporaine, Paris, L'Harmattan, 2016, 300 p. ISBN 978-234309129-7
- Prier sans cesse : la voie spirituelle de l'invocation dans les religions, in collaboration with Ghislain Chetan, Wattrelos (France), Tasnîm, 2012, 367 p. ISBN 978-295322008-7
- L’Éden entredit : lecture de La Chanson d'Ève de Charles Van Lerberghe, New York, Peter Lang, 1994, 150 p. ISBN 978-082042374-6
- Rodenbach, les décors de silence : essai sur la poésie de Georges Rodenbach, Bruxelles, Labor, 1990, 129 p. ISBN 978-280400533-7
