= Thomas Yellowtail =

- Born: March 7, 1903; Crow Indian reservation near Lodge Grass, Montana
- Died: November 24, 1993 (aged 90)
- Citizenship: American
- Known for: Sun Dance preservationist, Native American activist, Medicine Man
- Spouse: Susie Walking Bear Yellowtail
- Father: Hawk with the Yellow Tail Feathers
- Relatives: Robert Yellowtail (brother)

Thomas Yellowtail (March 7, 1903 – November 24, 1993) was the Sun Dance Chief of the Crow Tribe. Before his death, Yellowtail was a medicine man for over thirty years and dedicated his life to the preservation of the Crow Tribe Sun Dance ceremonial traditions.

== Early reservation life ==
Yellowtail was born in the south of Lodge Grass, Montana, on the Crow Indian reservation. His father's name was Hawk with the Yellow Tail Feathers. It was a common practice at the time for the U.S. government to assign surnames to the Native Americans as a means of assimilating them into white culture and to ease record-keeping. Therefore, the child of Hawk with the Yellow Tail Feathers and his wife was given the last name Yellowtail.

In Yellowtail’s youth, warriors who had participated in the Plains Wars and had lived the traditional nomadic life of their people were still living, although they had been forced into the reservations. Yellowtail often recalled seeing old warriors sitting around campfires performing sacred ceremonies.

== Spiritual influences ==
The Lodge Grass valley is an important cultural and historical area for the Crow Nation, associated with prominent leaders and traditional ways of life. When he was six years old, one of the Crow Nation’s chiefs, Medicine Crow, gave Yellowtail his Native American name, Medicine Rock Chief. The name is derived from Chief Medicine Crow's personal spiritual medicine, reflecting cultural naming traditions. During this period, the United States Government's policies restricted many ancestral traditions. Various laws (such as the United States Secretary of the Interior's order of 1884) prohibited many traditional ceremonies, such as the Sun Dance, for almost 50 years. In his youth, the reservation children, including Yellowtail, were forced into government boarding schools. At those boarding schools, the children were forbidden to speak their own language and had to wear Western clothing and cut their hair.

During the reservation era, various Christian denominations established churches on or near Native American reservations and actively engaged in missionary efforts. On the Crow Reservation, missionary activity led to significant religious influence among families, although the extent of formal assignment to specific churches is not well documented.

== Return of the Sun Dance to the Crow Tribe ==
The Crow tribe did not perform their ancestral Sun Dance during the fifty-year prohibition by the U.S. Government. When the Sun Dance became legal again in 1934, the original Crow Sun Dance was a forgotten memory and could not be revived. The Shoshone tribe had periodically performed their ancestral Sun Dance during the prohibition without the knowledge of the bureaucracy in Washington. When the prohibition ended, John Trehero, a Shoshone medicine man, emerged as the preeminent Shoshone Sun Dance chief. The Crow tribe asked John Trehero to help them lead a Sun Dance on the Crow Reservation in the early 1940s. This was the beginning of the revival of the Sun Dance on the Crow Reservation.

Starting in 1943, Yellowtail participated in the annual Sun Dance and monthly prayer meetings. Over the next twenty years, he practiced daily prayer, used the sweat lodge, and went on periodic vision quests.

== Medicine Man and Sun Dance Chief ==
In 1963, John Trehero informed Yellowtail that his Medicine Fathers had instructed him to transfer the authority to run the Crow Sun Dance over to Yellowtail. For the next thirty years, until his death on November 24, 1993, Yellowtail served as Crow Sun Dance chief and helped perpetuate the Crow Sun Dance Religion.

== Preserving the old ways ==
Yellowtail advocated for the study of ancestral spiritual traditions. He referred to these practices as the Sun Dance Religion and considered them a viable spiritual path. Yellowtail advised those seeking his guidance to participate in the vision quest, sweat lodge, and daily prayer with the pipe under the direction of a Sun Dance chief. He encouraged Native American youth to learn the language of their tribe and to seek out the spiritual leaders who followed the traditional ceremonies of their people. Thomas Yellowtail wrote his autobiography as a means of preserving the ancient spiritual traditions he held sacred for future generations.

Yellowtail was part of a generation that transitioned into a different cultural environment while maintaining traditional practices. He and other leaders worked to preserve the spiritual traditions of the Plains tribes.

== Bibliography ==
- Yellowtail Crow Medicine Man and Sun Dance Chief, an autobiography as told to Michael Oren Fitzgerald, University of Oklahoma Press, 1991. ISBN 0-8061-2602-7
- Native Spirit and the Sun Dance Way, by Thomas Yellowtail, World Wisdom 2007.

== Film ==
- Native Spirit and the Sun Dance Way, DVD documentary based on the memoirs of Thomas Yellowtail, 2007, World Wisdom.

== Resource materials ==
- Companion Book to Native Spirit and the Sun Dance DVD
