= World Wisdom =

Independent American publishing company

- Founded: 1980
- Country of origin: United States
- Headquarters location: Bloomington, Indiana
- Distribution: Simon & Schuster
- Publication types: Books
- Imprints: Wisdom Tales Press
- Official website: worldwisdom.com, wisdomtalespress.com

World Wisdom is an independent American publishing company established in 1980 in Bloomington, Indiana. World Wisdom publishes religious and philosophical texts, including the work of authors such as Frithjof Schuon, Seyyed Hossein Nasr, Titus Burckhardt, Ananda K. Coomaraswamy, Joseph Epes Brown, Charles Eastman, Paul Goble, Swami Ramdas, Samdhong Rinpoche, William Stoddart, and Martin Lings.

The company publishes The Library of Perennial Philosophy, which focuses on the beliefs underlying the diverse religions, also referred to as Sophia Perennis or "Perennial Philosophy". World Wisdom's Library of Perennial Philosophy encompasses seven series.

== Series ==
Perennial Philosophy

- A school of thought begun in the twentieth century, it focuses on spiritual practices and beliefs found in all religions.

Sacred Worlds

- This series combines images from throughout the world with comparative selections of texts from the world religions. The books may focus on particular religions or upon common themes within several religions.

Sacred Art in Tradition

- This series focuses on the principle of the role of beauty in the Perennial Philosophy. The books contain reproductions of traditional art (such as paintings, sculptures, architectures, and vestimentary art), and contrasting writings by religious authorities on the particular subject.

Spiritual Classics

- This series focuses on reproducing “classic” religious works from around the world that have been lost or forgotten. The books include modern introductions which place the works within the framework of the Perennial Philosophy.

Spiritual Masters—East & West

- This series presents the writings of spiritual authorities from throughout the world. These writings are combined with modern tools as well, including biographical information and a glossary of terms, as well as historical maps, and pictorial and photographic art.

Treasures of the World's Religions

- This series is an anthology of scriptures and writings of spiritual authorities of the past on fundamental themes of religion. Some books focus on a single spiritual tradition, while others have a unifying topic that touches upon traditions from around the world.

Writings of Frithjof Schuon

- The writings of Frithjof Schuon form the foundation of the World Wisdom library because he is the pre-eminent exponent of the Perennial Philosophy.

== Awards ==
- MIPA 2005 - Nature (Honorable Mention - 3rd) - "All Our Relatives: Traditional Native American Thoughts about Nature"
- James Madison Award 2006- (Nominated)- "All Our Relatives: Traditional Native American Thoughts about Nature"
- MIPA 2004- Religion & Philosophy (1st place) - "Christian Spirit"
- MIPA 2005- Multicultural (Honorable Mention - 3rd) - "The Gospel of the Redman": Commemorative Edition
- MIPA 2005- Nature (Merit - 2nd) - "The Sermon of all Creation: Christians on Nature"
- MIPA 2005- Religion/Philosophy (Merit - 2nd place) - "The Sermon of all Creation: Christians on Nature"
- MIPA 2005- Multicultural (1st place) - "The Spirit of Indian Women"
- MIPA 2005- Religion/Philosophy (1st place) - "The Spirit of Indian Women"
- MIPA 2005- Religion/Philosophy (Honorable Mention - 3rd place) - "The Sufi Doctrine of Rumi"
- Foreword 2005- Religion (Bronze) - "The Sufi Doctrine of Rumi"
- Foreword 2006- Religion (Finalist) - "The Universal Spirit of Islam: From the Koran and Hadith"
- Foreword 2006- Religion (Finalist)- "Samdhong Rinpoche Uncompromising Truth for a Compromised World: Tibetan Buddhism and Today's World"
- MIPA 2006- Culture (1st place)- "Indian Spirit: Revised & Enlarged"
- MIPA 2006- Religion/Philosophy/Inspiration (1st place)- "Indian Spirit": Revised & Enlarged
- MIPA 2006- Religion/Philosophy/Inspiration (Honorable Mention - tie for 3rd) - "Samdhong Rinpoche Uncompromising Truth for a Compromised World: Tibetan Buddhism and Today's World"
- MIPA 2006- Religion/Philosophy/Inspiration (Merit Award - 2nd place) - "The Universal Spirit of Islam: From the Koran and Hadith"
- MIPA 2006- Interior Layout (1st place) - "The Foundations of Christian Art"
- MIPA 2007 - Religion/Philosophy/Inspiration (Finalist) - "Native Spirit: The Sun Dance Way"
- MIPA 2007 - Culture (Finalist) - "Native Spirit: The Sun Dance Way"
- MIPA 2007 - Religion/Philosophy/Inspiration (Finalist) - "The Essential Charles Eastman"
- MIPA 2007 - Child/Young-Adult Non-Fiction (Finalist) - "Tipi: Home of the Nomadic Buffalo Hunter"
- MIPA 2007 - Nature (Finalist) - "Tipi: Home of the Nomadic Buffalo Hunter"
- Foreword Book of the Year 2007- Religion (Silver)- "The Essential Shinran"
- Foreword Book of the Year 2007- Juvenile Nonfiction (Finalist)- "Tipi: Home of the Nomadic Buffalo Hunter"
- PMA 2007- Arts (Finalist) - "The Foundations of Christian Art"
- PMA 2007- Religion (Finalist) - "The Universal Spirit of Islam"
- PMA 2007- Religion (Finalist) - "The Universal Spirit of Islam: From the Koran and Hadith"
- PMA 2007- Interior Design, Children's/Young Adult (Finalist) - "Tipi: Home of the Nomadic Buffalo Hunter"
- PMA 2007- New Age/Metaphysics/Spirituality (Finalist) - "Native Spirit: The Sun Dance Way"

== Wisdom Tales Press ==
In 2012, World Wisdom launched a children and teen book imprint, Wisdom Tales Press, with its stated goal as "Sharing the wisdom and beauty of cultures from around the world with young readers and their families."

Wisdom Tales publishes titles by well-known children book authors Paul Goble and Demi, as well as teen author Michael O. Fitzgerald.
