= Ahmad al-Alawi =

Algerian Sufi and Alawiyya order founder (1869–1934)

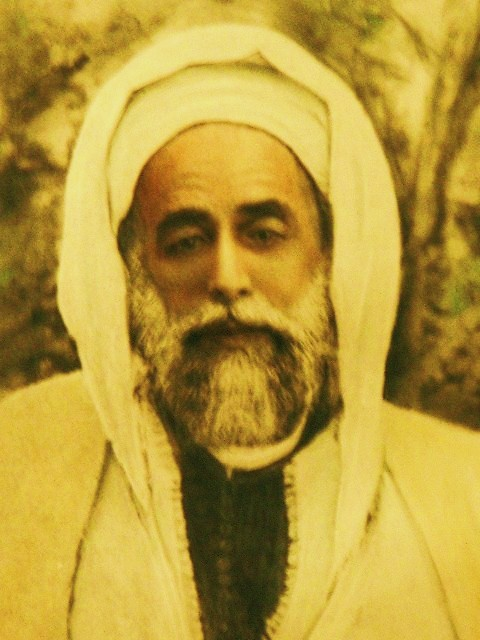
- Ahmad al-Alawi (c. 1920)

Spiritual master
- Born: 1869; Mostaganem, French Algeria
- Died: 1934; Mostaganem
- Venerated in: Islam
- Major shrine: Tomb of Sheikh Ahmad al-Alawi, Mostaganem, Algeria
- Influences: Ali, Muhammad al-Buzidi
- Tradition or genre: Darqawa
- Major works: Diwan, Mahbadi at-Ta'yid, Dauhat al-Asrar, Munajat

Ahmad al-Alawi (1869 – 14 July 1934), in full Abū al-ʿAbbās Aḥmad ibn Muṣṭafā ibn ʿAlīwa, known as al-ʿAlāwī al-Mustaghānimī (Arabic: أبو العباس أحمد بن مصطفى بن عليوة المعروف بالعلاوي المستغانمي), was an Algerian Sufi Sheikh who founded his own Sufi order, called the Alawiyya.

== Biography ==
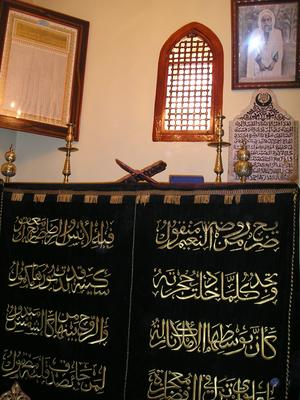
The tomb of Sheikh Ahmad al-Alawi in Mostaganem, Algeria

Sheikh Ahmad al-Alawi was born in Mostaganem, in 1869. He was educated at home by his father. From the time of his father's death in 1886 until 1894, he worked in Mostaganem.

For fifteen years he followed the Darqawi sheikh Muhammad al-Buzidi in Mostaganem. After al-Buzidi's death in 1909, Sheikh Al-Alawi returned to Mostaganem after a journey to the east (Istanbul), where he first spread the Darqawiyya, and then (in 1914) established his own order, called the Alawiyya in honor of Ali, the son-in-law of Muhammad, who is said to have appeared to him in a vision and gave him that name for his new order.

== Teachings ==
Al-Alawi was a Sufi sheikh in the classic Darqawi Shadhili tradition, though his order differed somewhat from the norm in its use of the systematic practice of khalwa and in laying especial emphasis on the invocation of the Supreme Name [of God]..

In addition to being a classic Sufi sheikh, al-Alawi addressed the problems of modern Algerians using modern methods. He wrote poetry and books on established Sufi topics, and founded and directed two weekly newspapers, the short-lived Lisan al-Din (Language of Faith) in 1912, and the longer-lived Al-balagh al-jazairi (Algerian Messenger) in 1926.

Al-Alawi attempted to reconcile Islam and modernity. On the one hand, he criticized Westernization, both at a symbolic level (by discouraging the adoption of Western costumes that lead to ego attachment) and at a practical level (by attacking the growing consumption of alcohol among Algerian Muslims). On the other hand, he encouraged his followers to send their children to school to learn French, and even favored the translation of the Quran into French and Berber for the sake of making it more accessible, a position that was at that time most controversial.

Al-Alawi was critical of both fundamentalist extremism in Islam as well as secularist modernism, typified in Turkey by Mustafa Kemal Atatürk. For him, the answers to the challenges of modernity were the doctrines and practices of traditional and spiritual Islam and the rites of religion had no other purpose than to cause the "Remembrance of God".

Although al-Alawi showed unusual respect for Christians, and was in some ways an early practitioner of inter-religious dialogue, the centerpiece of his message to Christians was that if only they would abandon the doctrines of the trinity and of incarnation "nothing would then separate us."

The great size of his following may be explained by the combination of classic Sufism with engagement in contemporary issues, combined with his charisma, to which many sources, both Algerian and French, speak. Al-Alawi's French physician, Marcel Carret, wrote of his first meeting with Sheikh al-Alawi: "What immediately struck me was his resemblance to the face which is generally used to represent Christ."

== The Alawiyya ==
The Alawiyya spread throughout Algeria, as well as in other parts of the Maghreb, as a result of Sheikh al-Alawi's travels, preaching, and writing and through the activities of his muqaddams (representatives). By the time of al-Alawi's death in 1934, he had become one of the best-known and most celebrated sheikhs of the century and was visited by many.

The Alawiyya was one of the first Sufi orders to establish a presence in Europe, notably among Algerians in France and Yemenis in Wales. Sheikh al-Alawi himself travelled to France in 1926, and led the first communal prayer to inaugurate the newly-built Grand Mosque of Paris in the presence of the French president. Sheikh al-Alawi understood French well, though he was reluctant to speak it.

The Alawiyya branch also spread as far as Damascus, Syria, where authorization was given to Muhammad al-Hashimi, who spread the Alawi branch throughout the Levant. In 1930, Sheikh Al-Alawi met with Sheikh Sidi Abu Madyan of the Qadiri Boutchichi tariqah in Mostaganem. They currently have the shortest chain back to Sheikh al-Alawi. The current Sheikh of the Boutchichi is Jamal al-Qadiri al-Boutchichi.

The Alawi-Ahmadi tariqah is one of two prominent Sufi tariqat in the Sinai Peninsula in Egypt. It is prevalent around Jurah and its surrounding areas, such as the areas of Shabbanah, Dhahir, Malafiyyah, and Sheikh Zuweid.

== Books ==
- On the Unique Name and on 'The Treasury of Truths' of Shaykh Muhammad Ibn al-Habib, ISBN 978-979-96688-0-6, IB Madinah Press (January 31, 2001)
- Knowledge of God, A sufic commentary on the Murshid al-Mu’in of ibn al-‘Ashir ISBN 0-906512-16-6, Diwan Press (1981)
- Two Who Attained : Twentieth-Century Sufi Saints: Shaykh Ahmad al-'Alawi & Fatima al-Yashrutiyya, Selections translated from Shaykh Ahmad al-'Alawi's The Divine Graces and a Treatise on the Invocation, ISBN 1-887752-69-2 by Leslie Cadavid (translator) and Seyyed Hossein Nasr (introduction), ed. Fons Vitae (2006)
- Lings, Martin, A Sufi saint of the twentieth century: Shaikh Ahmad al-Alawi, his spiritual heritage and legacy, includes a short anthology of al-'Alawi's poetry as the final chapter (12). ISBN 0-946621-50-0
- Munajat of Shaykh Ahmad al-'Alawi: Translated by Abdul-Majid Bhurgri. eBook edition, containing the original Arabic text and the English rendering, can be viewed at
