= The Matheson Trust =

Comparative religion educational charity

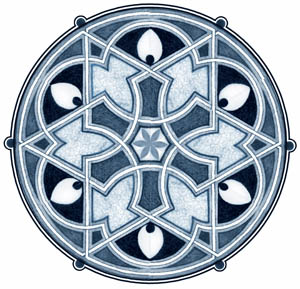
- Founded: 1974
- Founder: D M Matheson CBE
- Type: Educational Charity
- Registration no.: 284155
- Purpose: Comparative religion, Religious symbolism, Perennial philosophy, Theology and Metaphysics
- Location: London, UK
- Region served: World
- Key people: Martin Lings; Gai Eaton; William Stoddart
- Affiliations: Charity Commission for England and Wales
- Website: themathesontrust.org

The Matheson Trust is an educational charity based in London dedicated to further and disseminate the study of comparative religion, especially from the point of view of the underlying harmony of the major religious and philosophical traditions of the world.

== History ==
The Matheson Trust was established in London in 1974 by Donald Macleod Matheson CBE (1896-1979), who in addition to his work as a civil servant was active as a translator of Perennialist works, most notably Understanding Islam by Frithjof Schuon and An Introduction to Sufi Doctrine by Titus Burckhardt.

Registered as a UK charity in 1982, the trust was for years active in sponsoring academic research, lectures, film production and publications. In January 2011 a new series of paperback publications was launched, the Matheson Monographs, and a public website went online hosting the Matheson Library.

Matheson Trust associates have included, among others, Martin Lings, Charles Le Gai Eaton, William Stoddart and Reza Shah-Kazemi.

== Matheson Monographs ==
Since 2008, The Matheson Trust had been co-producing publications with a number of kindred organisations and established publishers: The Prometheus Trust, Fons Vitae (KY), Archetype UK, but December 2010 saw the launch of an independent series, the "Matheson Monographs", covering "scriptural exegesis, the modalities of spiritual and contemplative life, studies of particular religious traditions, comparative analyses, studies of traditional arts, crafts and cosmological sciences, contemporary scholarly expositions of religious philosophy and metaphysics, translations of both classical and contemporary texts and transcriptions of lectures by, and interviews with, spiritual and scholarly authorities from different religious and philosophical traditions".

== Matheson Library ==
In March 2011 the Matheson Trust website was launched, hosting an online library of free selected books and articles, almost exclusively in English, including authors and sources as varied as Shaykh Abdallah Bin Bayyah, the Archbishop of Canterbury Rowan Williams, the Berzin archives, Charles, Prince of Wales, Chief Rabbi Jonathan Sacks, James Cutsinger, Gavin D'Costa, Seyyed Hossein Nasr, Harry Oldmeadow, the journal Sacred Web, Huston Smith, Timothy Winter (Shaykh Abdal Hakim Murad), The Woolf Institute of Abrahamic Faiths and others. Documents are free to browse and download, most in PDF format, with a few articles in HTML.

As of December 2021, there are approximately 750 holdings in the library, a quarter of which are audio recordings.

=== Audio Library ===
One of the purported aims of the Matheson Library is to use existing contemporary media technologies to make available resources from ancient traditions, either in the form of recitation of traditional scriptures or in the scholarly transmission of the doctrines and insights pertaining to the different religions. An ongoing hear! project is converting scholarly texts and other texts of interest into MP3 format, and making them available through the Audio section of the library. In April 2012 the Matheson Trust Sacred Audio Collection was launched, a repository of selected liturgical audio recordings from the major religious traditions. This collection includes live recordings from temples and ritual gatherings around the world.

=== Publications ===
- Christianity & Islam: Essays on Ontology and Archetype, by Samuel Zinner, 2010. ISBN 978-1-908092-01-4
- The Living Palm Tree: Parables, Stories, and Teachings from the Kabbalah, by Mario Satz, translated by Juan Acevedo, 2010. ISBN 978-1-908092-00-7
- Louis Massignon: The Vow and the Oath, by Patrick Laude, translated by Edin Q. Lohja, 2011. ISBN 978-1-908092-06-9
- The Gospel of Thomas: In the Light of Early Jewish, Christian and Islamic Esoteric Trajectories, by Samuel Zinner, 2011. ISBN 978-1-908092-04-5
- Sacred Royalty: From The Pharaoh to The Most Christian King, by Jean Hani, translated by Gustavo Polit, 2011. ISBN 978-1-908092-05-2
- Ascent to Heaven in Islamic and Jewish Mysticism, by Algis Uždavinys, 2011. ISBN 978-1-908092-02-1
- Orpheus and the Roots of Platonism, by Algis Uždavinys, 2011. ISBN 978-1-908092-07-6
- Enduring Utterance: Collected Talks, by Martin Lings, 2015. ISBN 978-1-908092-09-0
- Primordial Meditation, by Frithjof Schuon, translated by Angela Schwartz and Gillian Harris, 2015. ISBN 978-1-908092-12-0
- Weighing the Word, by Peter Samsel, 2016. ISBN 978-1-908092-14-4
- Breaking the Spell of the New Atheism in the Light of Perennial Wisdom, by Gustavo Polit, 2017. ISBN 978-1-908092-15-1
- The Queen and the Avatar, by Dominique Wohlschlag, 2017. ISBN 978-1-908092-16-8
- The Great War of the Dark Age: Keys to the Mahabharata, by Dominique Wohlschlag, 2019. ISBN 978-1-908092-17-5
- Imam ‘Ali From Concise History to Timeless Mystery, by Reza Shah-Kazemi, 2019. ISBN 978-1-908092-18-2

== See also ==
=== Institutions and initiatives ===
- A Common Word Between Us and You
- Studies in Comparative Religion
- Temenos Academy
- Woolf Institute of Abrahamic Faiths

=== Scholars and authors ===
- Jean Borella
- Titus Burckhardt
- Ananda Coomaraswamy
- James Cutsinger
- Professor David F. Ford
- Ronald S. Green
- René Guénon
- Jean Hani
- Ali Lakhani
- Charles le Gai Eaton
- Martin Lings
- Marc Loopuyt
- Rusmir Mahmutćehajić
- Jean-Louis Michon
- Seyyed Hossein Nasr
- Harry Oldmeadow
- Reza Shah-Kazemi
- Leo Schaya
- Frithjof Schuon
- Huston Smith
- William Stoddart
- Algis Uždavinys
- Walter James, 4th Baron Northbourne
