= Francis Clive-Ross =

British publisher and editor (1921–1981)

Francis Fabian Clive-Ross (1921–1981) was a British publisher and author whose works focused on occultism, comparative religion, and the Traditionalist School. Clive-Ross was also a Trustee of the World of Islam Festival (held in London in 1976), as well as a justice of the peace.

== Publishing ==
Clive-Ross was the proprietor for many years of the Aquarian Book Service, established at Pates Manor. He relinquished his interest in Aquarian Press around 1966. Soon after the London Spiritualist Alliance was reorganized as the College of Psychic Science in 1955, Clive-Ross became editor of the long-established Spiritualist journal Light. Under his editorship, the journal expanded its scope to include articles on occultism, comparative religion, and parapsychology, some of them highly critical and skeptical. Readers demanded that the journal revert to its former role as a Spiritualist publication. Clive-Ross pointed out that he had accepted editorship on the condition that Light be an independent journal. Subsequently, he resigned and Dr. V. F. Underwood took over.

Clive-Ross formed Perennial Books to specialize in metaphysics, philosophy, and religion. He retained a critical faculty in dealing with occult subjects, believing that there is a good deal of fraud or self-deception in Spiritualism and psychical research. Clive-Ross was the founder, editor-in-chief and publisher of Studies in Comparative Religion; the earliest English-language journal of traditional studies, founded in Britain in 1963 and continuing until its publication was interrupted in 1987. The journal focused on the spiritual practices and religious symbolism of the world's religions. The journal was notable for the number of prominent Perennialists who contributed to it.

“It was because he himself believed that such ideas are the most real things in the world that Clive-Ross found the strength to struggle against difficulties (not least those of funding) which might have seemed insuperable to a lesser man. It was his deep conviction that the beliefs, the spiritual “point of view”, expressed in the pages of Studies represented a truth for which the world is hungry that enabled him to fulfill his task up to the end of his life. In this he was single-minded and showed a toughness which contrasted with his amiable and easygoing nature.”

— Charles le Gai Eaton on Clive-Ross’s dedication to Studies in Comparative Religion

== Books ==
- Studies in Comparative Religion: 1967 Commemorative Annual Edition (World Wisdom, 2007) ISBN 978-1-933316-54-3
- Studies in Comparative Religion: 1968 Commemorative Annual Edition (World Wisdom, 2007) ISBN 978-1-933316-55-0
- The Church of St. Mary the Virgin, East Bedfont (British Publishing, 1970)

== See also ==
- Studies in Comparative Religion
- The Matheson Trust
- Traditionalist School
