= Jean Hani =

French philosopher and Traditionalist author

- Born: 1917
- Died: 30 September 2012 (aged 94–95)
- Occupations: Philosopher, scholar

Academic work
- Main interests: Metaphysics, Esotericism, Symbolism, Mythology, Greek Philosophy, Christianity, Religious texts, Comparative religion
- Notable ideas: Christian mysticism and symbolism; critique of modernity

Jean Hani (1917-30 September 2012) was a French philosopher and Traditionalist author, and a professor of Greek civilization and literature at the University of Amiens.

== Life and Works ==
Very little is known about Jean Hani's personal life other than his year of birth. Jean Borella's mention of the author's modesty and his older age "studious retirement" seem to agree with this scarcity of information.

Born in 1917, Hani proved a bright secondary student, pursuing his university studies in Classical Literature, and finally obtaining a doctorate with a dissertation about the influence of Egyptian religion on the thought of Plutarch. Appointed a lecturer at the University of Amiens, he founded the Centre de Recherches sur l'Antiquité Classique, and he led for many years a Seminar of History of Greek religion. After his retirement, in addition to his prolific activity as an author of Traditional works, he became a frequent collaborator of journals like Connaissance des Religions and Vers la tradition. Hani has been praised for his studies on Christian symbolism, particularly on the mass and the esotericism of Christian architecture.

Three kinds of works may be discerned within Hani's production: works of Classical philology, works dealing with history of religions and works dealing with traditional and sacred symbolism. The first group is represented by his annotated translations of Plutarch, published partly within the well-known Collection Budé. The second group is represented by his doctoral dissertation mentioned above. And the third group includes works like Le Symbolisme du temple chrétien (1962), Les Métiers de Dieu (1975), La Divine liturgie (1981) and La Royauté sacrée (1984) where his mastery of traditional hermeneutics and exegesis is firmly established. These books have been translated into English and several other European languages.

According to Jean Borella, the principles expounded in Le Symbolisme du temple chrétien have already been put into practice in the establishment of some contemporary monastic foundations. Borella also considers Hani to be the first author in academia to successfully marry Guénon's insights to the contemporary study of Hellenistic religions and Christianity.

== Publications ==
=== French Originals ===
- Le Symbolisme du temple chrétien, Paris, la Colombe: Éditions du Vieux Colombier (Ligugé, impr. Aubin), 1962.
- Consolation à Apollonios, texte et traduction avec introduction et commentaire par Jean Hani. Paris: Klincksieck, 1972.
- La Religion égyptienne dans la pensée de Plutarque. Paris: les Belles lettres, 1976.
- Plutarque, Oeuvres morales Tome VIII : Traités 42-45. Paris: Editions "Les Belles Lettres", 1980 (ISBN 978-2-251-00268-2).
- La Divine liturgie: aperçus sur la messe. Paris: Éditions de la Maisnie, 1981 (ISBN 2-85707-065-9).
- La Royauté sacrée: du pharaon au roi très chrétien. Paris: Guy Trédaniel, 1984 (ISBN 2-85707-133-7). Reprinted 2010: Paris, l'Harmattan, ISBN 978-2-296-11676-4.
- Mythes, rites et symboles. Les chemins de l'invisible. Paris, Guy Trédaniel Editeur, 1992 (ISBN 978-2-857074-91-5).
- La Vierge noire et le mystère marial. Paris: Guy Trédaniel, 1995 (ISBN 2-85707-723-8).
- Le monde à l'envers: essais critiques sur la civilisation moderne. Lausanne: l'Âge d'homme, 2001 (ISBN 2-8251-1441-3).
- Plutarque, Oeuvres morales Tome II : Traités 10-14. Paris: Editions "Les Belles Lettres", 2003 (ISBN 978-2-251-00372-6).
- Les métiers de Dieu: préliminaires à une spiritualité du travail. Paris: J.-C. Godefroy, impr. 2010 (ISBN 978-2-86553-219-3).

=== English Translations ===
- The Black Virgin: A Marian Mystery. San Rafael, CA: Sophia Perennis, 2007 (ISBN 978-1-597310-65-9).
- Divine Craftsmanship: Preliminaries to a Spirituality of Work. New York: Sophia Perennis, 2007 (ISBN 978-1-597310-68-0).
- The Divine Liturgy: Insights Into Its Mystery. San Rafael, CA: Sophia Perennis, 2008 (ISBN 978-1-597310-75-8)
- The Symbolism of the Christian Temple. San Rafael, CA: Sophia Perennis, 2007 (ISBN 978-1-597310-75-8)
- Sacred Royalty. London: The Matheson Trust, 2011 (ISBN 978-1-908092-05-2). Book excerpt

== See also ==
- Perennial Philosophy
- Titus Burckhardt
