= Donald Macleod Matheson =

British religious scholar (1896–1979)

Donald Macleod Matheson CBE
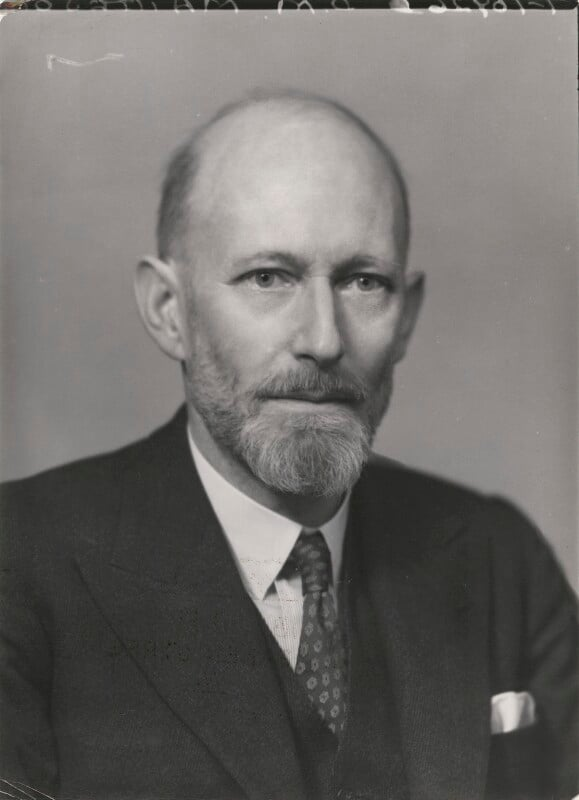
- Matheson in 1954
- Born: 20 June 1896
- Died: 14 January 1979 (aged 82)
- Occupation(s): Translator, scholar
- Title: Commander of the Order of the British Empire

Donald Macleod Matheson (occasionally only MacLeod Matheson) CBE (1896–1979) was a member of the War Works Commission, and Secretary to the National Trust from 1934 to 1945. Active within the Traditionalist School as a translator and author, he founded The Matheson Trust for the study of comparative religion. He was a sibling of Hilda Matheson. As the National Trust secretary, he was at the receiving end of some of the Ferguson's Gang’s exploits.

== Life ==
Born into an aristocratic Scottish family, Matheson was educated at Balliol College, Oxford. After serving in the artillery during World War I, he held the post of Secretary to the National Trust, which with the years earned him an appointment as CBE in 1945. Matheson was a close friend of G. E. H. Palmer (author and translator of the Eastern Orthodox text, the Philokalia). He worked as a Director for John Smedley until his retirement in 1967. Matheson maintained associations with Perennialist authors for many years, and his translations of French works by Schuon and Burckhardt were published in the UK, India and Pakistan. Some of his translations were made in collaboration with Buddhist scholar Marco Pallis.

== Works ==
=== Books ===
- The National Trust: A Record of Fifty Years' Achievement (contributor). London: B.T. Batsford, Ltd., 1946.
- Places of Natural Beauty (National Trust Guide). London: B.T. Batsford, Ltd., 1950.
- Science and the Myth of Progress (one chapter contributed), Bloomington, IN: World Wisdom, 2003 (ISBN 978-0 941532-47-1).

=== Articles ===
- "The Control of National Parks", The Observer, 23 June 1946, p. 4.
- Articles contributed to Tomorrow (later Studies in Comparative Religion):

- "Knowledge and KNOWLEDGE". Tomorrow 12, no. 2, (1964): 115-118.
- "Psycho-Analysis and Spirituality". Tomorrow 13, no. 2, (1965): 103-108.
- "Two Indian Saints". Tomorrow 13, no. 3, (1965): 38-41.

=== Translations ===
- Schuon, Frithjof, Spiritual Perspectives and Human Facts. London: Faber and Faber, 1954 (reprinted by Sophia Perennis under ISBN 978-0-900588-01-3).
- ———, Castes and Races, trans. Marco Pallis and Macleod Matheson. Pates Manor, Bedfont, Middlesex: Perennial Books, 1959.
- ———, Language of the Self, trans. Marco Pallis and Macleod Matheson. Madras: Ganesh, 1959.
- ———, Understanding Islam. London: Allen & Unwin, 1963, 1976, 1979; Baltimore, Maryland: Penguin Books, 1972.
- Burckhardt, Titus, An Introduction to Sufi Doctrine. Wellingborough, Northamptonshire: Thorsons Publishers Ltd, 1976 (new edition by World Wisdom, 2008, ISBN 978-1-933316-50-5).

== See also ==
- Perennial Philosophy
- The Matheson Trust
