= Oldmeadow =

Oldmeadow is a surname. Notable people with the surname include:

- Harry Oldmeadow (born 1947), Australian academic and writer
- Max Oldmeadow (1924–2013), Australian politician
