= Jean Biès =

French traditionalist philosopher

Jean Biès (1933 – 11 January 2014) was a French philosopher and author. He is the recipient of the High Prize of the Society of French Poets (1970), Chevalier of the French Legion of Honor (1997), and a prolific modern proponent of the Traditionalist School. His works deal with the union of Eastern and Western philosophy.

== Biography ==
Born in Bordeaux, France in 1933, much of his childhood and adolescence was spent in Algiers. Jean Biès studied Classics at the University of Algiers before continuing his studies at the Sorbonne. His doctoral dissertation, which studied the relationship between French literature and Hindu thought (Littérature française et la Pensée Hindoue), was awarded the Prix d’Asie by the Académie des sciences d'outre-mer.

Coming across the writings of René Guénon in 1951, Biès discovered the existence of initiatory teachings. This had a large influence on his beliefs and writings and he went on to meet several prominent members of the Traditionalist School including Frithjof Schuon.

He was awarded the Chevalier of the French Legion of Honor in 1997.

After the loss of his wife, the Jungian analyst Rolande Biès in January 2012, Jean Biès committed suicide in the 16th arrondissement of Paris, in January 2014.

== Writings ==
Biès has written extensively on the subject of traditional wisdom and his works take many forms including essays, poetry, travel accounts, personal testimonies, and scholarly articles. He retired in 1993 so he could focus his time entirely on his writing. In 2004 World Wisdom published the first English-language collection of his writings, entitled Returning to the Essential: The Selected Writings of Jean Bies.

The Catholic philosopher Jean Borella referred to Biès as "one of the great and most authentic poets of our time".

== See also ==
- Traditionalist School
- René Guénon

== Bibliography ==
English

- Sophia Volume 12 Number 1 (Foundation for Traditional Studies, 2007) ISBN 978-0-9629984-9-2
- Ye Shall Know the Truth (World Wisdom, 2005) ISBN 978-0-941532-69-3
- Returning to the Essential: The Selected Writings of Jean Bies (World Wisdom, 2004) ISBN 978-0-941532-63-1

French

- John Tavener, l'enchanteur : Une introduction à la musique du silence (Les Deux Océans, 2008) ISBN 978-2-86681-146-4
- Les alchimistes (OXUS, 2007) ISBN 978-2-84898-085-0
- Petit dictionnaire d'impertinences spirituelles (Entrelacs, 2006) ISBN 978-2-908606-33-1
- Voies de Sages : Douze maîtres spirituels témoignent de leur vérité (OXUS, 2006) ISBN 978-2-84898-065-2
- Les grands initiés du XXe siècle : Trente voies pratiques de réalisation (OXUS, 2005) ISBN 978-2-84898-055-3
- Retour à l'essentiel : Quelle spiritualité pour l'homme d'aujourd'hui? (L'Age d'Homme, 2004) ISBN 978-2-8251-1842-9
- Vivre et transmettre la tradition (Dervy, 2004) ISBN 978-2-84454-248-9
- Par les chemins de vie et d'oeuvre : Entretiens avec Mireya de Alson (Les Deux Océans, 2001) ISBN 978-2-86681-099-3
- Littérature française et pensée hindoue, des origines à 1950 (Klincksieck, 2000) ISBN 978-2-252-01619-0
- Les Alchimistes (Kiron: Philippe Lebaud, 2000) ISBN 978-2-86645-358-9
- Athos: La montagne transfigurée (Deux Océans, 2000) ISBN 978-2-86681-068-9
- La Porte de l'appartement des femmes (Dauphin (Le), 1998) ISBN 978-2-907963-15-2
- L'initiatrice (Editions du Dauphin, 1998) ISBN 978-2-907963-11-4
- Voies de sages (Editions du Felin, 1996) ISBN 978-2-86645-243-8
- Paroles d'urgence (Terre du Ciel, 1996) ISBN 978-2-908933-11-6
- Les chemins de la ferveur : Voyage en Inde (Terre du Ciel, 1995) ISBN 978-2-908933-08-6
- Arts, gnose et alchimie. Trois sources de régénérescence (Courrier du Livre, 1987) ISBN 978-2-7029-0177-9
