= Marco Pallis =

Buddhist scholar and mystic

- Born: 19 June 1895; Liverpool, England
- Died: 5 June 1989 (aged 93)
- Known for: Writings on Tibet

Marco Alexander Pallis (19 June 1895 – 5 June 1989) was a Greek-British author and mountaineer with close affiliations to the Traditionalist School. He wrote works on the religion and culture of Tibet.

== Early life: Education, Travels, and Wartime Experiences ==
Born in Liverpool on 19 June 1895, he was the youngest son of wealthy and cosmopolitan Greek parents. Pallis was educated at Harrow School and the University of Liverpool, where he studied entomology. In 1911 he traveled to British Guiana to study insects, and in 1912, he joined the Greek campaign against the Ottoman Empire during the first of the Balkan Wars. During the siege of Ioannina, the ancestral town of the Pallis family, he worked at a field hospital in Arta.

During the First World War, Pallis initially aided the Salvation Army in the region along the Sava River in Serbia. In 1916 he enlisted in the British Army and received a commission as an army interpreter in Macedonia. Malaria and a severe inflammation of his right eye cut short his Macedonian service. After a lengthy convalescence in Malta, Pallis applied to and was accepted by the Grenadier Guards. He received basic training, then advanced training as a machine-gunner. In 1918, as a second lieutenant, he was sent to fight in the trenches of the Western Front. During the battle of Cambrai, in a charge that killed his captain and first lieutenant, Pallis was shot through the knee and was forced to retire from combat.

== Mountaineering, the Himalayas, and Introduction to Buddhism ==
Following the war, Pallis climbed and explored against doctor's orders for his injured knee. He went on expeditions to the Arctic, Switzerland, and the Dolomites, and Snowdonia, the Peak District, and the Scottish Highlands when closer to home. In 1933 Pallis led a small mountaineering party to the area of Kinnaur, one of the Himalayan borderlands. Near the village of Nako, at the border with Tibet, Pallis and his team succeeded in making the first ascent of Leo Pargial (22,280 feet).

In 1936 Pallis returned to the Himalayas at the head of another expedition. His party traveled first to Sikkim, an "antechamber of Tibet", where their failure to scale the summit of Simvu (22,360 feet) was, at least for Pallis, more than made up for by their encounter with the saintly abbot of Lachhen, in whom, according to Pallis, "intelligence, compassion, and initiatic authority were reflected in equal degree".

From Sikkim Pallis had hoped to cross the border into Tibet proper, but due to political circumstances it was impossible to obtain the necessary permissions. Forced to alter his plans, he decided instead to make his way to Ladakh. He was accompanied by his close friend Richard Nicholson and one other member of their climbing party, Dr. Robert Roaf. Once in Ladakh, they discarded Western clothes in favor of the chuba, and assumed as much as possible a Tibetan manner of living. "It was our way of saying to our hosts: 'We wish to be as one of you. Please make no unusual arrangements on our behalf. We love your tradition, and hope it will not be rashly changed. We have found means of attuning ourselves to its ways.'”

Pallis by now saw himself as a "pilgrim" of Tibetan Buddhism and in both Sikkim and Ladakh he received his religious education directly from qualified instructors within the living tradition. He dedicates his Peaks and Lamas to four teachers in particular, "the great contemplator, abbot of Lachhen, the venerable Dawa, bursar of Spituk, the venerable Konchhog Gyaltsan of P’hiyang, and the venerable Geshe Wangyal of Drepung, Lhasa who for my benefit and for the good of all creatures set in motion the Wheel of the Doctrine".

The Second World War prevented further travels until 1947, when Pallis and Richard Nicholson were able to visit the Tibetan heartland before the coming Chinese invasion. They traveled widely throughout Tibet's Tsang province, seeking to fulfill their shared desire to "absorb the spirit of the Tradition by direct experience". Over the course of their stay they were able to make contact with each of the four major schools of Tibetan Buddhism (Gelugpa, Nyingmapa, Kagyudpa, and Sakyapa), visiting such holy sites as the ancient Pel Sakya monastery, seat of the Sakyapa and "a treasure-house of all the arts at their very best", as well as the Tashilhunpo monastery, seat of the Panchen Lama and one of the four great monasteries of the Gelugpa.

After his departure from the Tibetan plateau, Pallis lived in Kalimpong, India, for nearly four years before returning to England in 1951. Kalimpong was then a center of literary and cultural activity, as well as a refuge for many of those who were being forced to leave Tibet. Pallis formed many lasting relationships during this time, including an acquaintance with the then queen of Bhutan and her family, whom he later visited in England, and with the Dalai Lama's former tutor Heinrich Harrer, with whom Pallis later collaborated in exposing the fraudulent writer Cyril Hoskin, alias “Lobsang Rampa”. While in Kalimpong, Pallis also met with the Dalai Lama's Great Royal Mother, and he developed a close relationship with the abbot of the nearby Tharpa Choling monastery.

After the political upheavals in Tibet in the 1950s, Pallis became active in the affairs of the Tibetan Society, the first Western support group created for the Tibetan people. Pallis also was able to house members of the Tibetan diaspora in his London flat. Pallis also formed a relationship with the young Chögyam Trungpa, who had just arrived in England. Trungpa asked Pallis to write the foreword to Trungpa's first, autobiographical book, Born in Tibet. In his acknowledgment, Trungpa offers Pallis his "grateful thanks" for the "great help" that Pallis provided in bringing the book to completion. He goes on to say that "Mr. Pallis when consenting to write the foreword, devoted many weeks to the work of finally putting the book in order".

== Musical career ==
Pallis studied music under Arnold Dolmetsch, the distinguished reviver of early English music, composer, and performer, and was considered "one of Dolmetsch's most devoted protégés". Pallis soon discovered a love of early music—in particular chamber music of the sixteenth and seventeenth centuries—and for the viola da gamba. Even while climbing in the region of the Satlej-Ganges watershed, he and his musically-minded friends did not fail to bring their instruments.

Pallis taught viol at the Royal Academy of Music, and reconstituted The English Consort of Viols, an ensemble he had first formed in the 1930s. It was one of the first professional performing groups dedicated to the preservation of early English music. They released three records and made several concert tours in England and two tours to the United States.

According to The New York Times review, their Town Hall concert of April 1962 "was a solid musical delight", the players having possessed "a rhythmic fluidity that endowed the music with elegance and dignity". Pallis also published several compositions, primarily for the viol, and wrote on the viol's history and its place in early English music.

The Royal Academy of Music, in recognition of a lifetime of contribution to the field of early music, awarded Pallis an Honorary Fellowship. At age eighty-nine his Nocturne de l’Ephemere was performed at the Queen Elizabeth Hall in London; his niece writes that "he was able to go on stage to accept the applause which he did with his customary modesty". When he died he left unfinished an opera based on the life of Milarepa.

== Writings on Buddhism and Tradition ==
Pallis described "tradition" as being the leitmotif of his writing. He wrote from the perspective of what has come to be called the traditionalist or perennialist school of comparative religion founded by René Guénon, Ananda K. Coomaraswamy, and Frithjof Schuon, each of whom he knew personally. As a traditionalist, Pallis assumed the "transcendent unity of religions" (the title of Schuon's landmark 1948 book) and it was in part this understanding that gave Pallis insight into the innermost nature of the spiritual tradition of Tibet, his chosen love. He was a frequent contributor to the journal Studies in Comparative Religion (along with Schuon, Guénon, and Coomaraswamy), writing on both the topics of Tibetan culture and religious practice as well as the Perennialist philosophy.

Pallis published three books over a span of almost forty years. His first, Peaks and Lamas (1939), mentioned previously, tells the story "of how access was gained, across the varying episodes of Himalayan travel, to a traditional world, still complete and vigorous, that of Buddhism in its Tibetan branch". This book was based on his travels in Kinnaur, Ladakh, and Sikkim in the Indian Himalayas. This was followed by The Way and the Mountain (1960) and by A Buddhist Spectrum (1980), both collections of essays that attempt to deal "with a number of Buddhist themes of prime importance in such a fashion as to make up . . . a coherent view of the world and of a human destiny realizable in this world as seen through Buddhist eyes" Several of Pallis' essays were also included in Jacob Needleman's The Sword of Gnosis. After his final journey to Tibet, while living in Kalimpong, Pallis wrote a short book in the Tibetan language addressing the dangers posed to Tibet by the encroachment of modern culture. In addition to penning his own writings, Pallis translated Buddhist texts into Greek, and translated works of fellow traditionalist writers René Guénon and Frithjof Schuon from French into English. Some of Pallis' own works have also been translated into Italian, French, Spanish, and Turkish.

Since the publication of his first book, sixty-six years ago, generations of scholars and students have turned to Pallis for insight into Buddhism and Tibet. His work is cited by such writers as Heinrich Harrer, Heinrich Zimmer, Joseph Campbell, Thomas Merton, Robert Aitken, and Huston Smith. Despite such scholarly acclaim, it is also true, as Harry Oldmeadow states, that "Pallis had no interest in research for its own sake, nor in any purely theoretical understanding of doctrine: his work was always attuned to the demands of the spiritual life itself. [His essays] should be of interest not only to those on the Buddhist path but to all spiritual wayfarers". Huston Smith expresses a similar judgment when he declares: "Though Pallis respects scholarship, he doesn’t consider himself a Buddhist scholar. . . . What he does is focus on key Buddhist teachings and mine their essential and existential meaning. In the course of this project he regularly refers to other traditions, especially Christianity. . . . The result is completely satisfying. For insight, and the beauty insight requires if it is to be effective, I find no writer on Buddhism surpassing him". Wendell Berry, Gary Snyder, and Robert Aitken gave encouragement to the reprinting of Pallis' classic Peaks and Lamas, which Wendell Berry has called, "The best book, in my limited reading, in connecting a form of Buddhism with its sustaining culture. . . . [It is] useful to anybody interested in what a traditional culture is or might be, and how such a culture might preserve itself".

== Death ==
Marco Pallis "retired to the Heavenly Fields" on 5 June 1989. Writing for the Independent, Peter Talbot Wilcox concludes the obituary of his friend with these words:

It remains to risk a brief comment: that he was and remains a great teacher . . . who made sense of life and of the life to come; in whose presence insuperable difficulties became less daunting; who took endless troubles to help those who brought their problems to him; someone to whom the spiritual quest in prayer was the one thing needful, who by his own life demonstrated the validity and truth of traditional teachings; and that, however emasculated by modernism, these remain the only valid criteria for those who, as he would put it, have ears to hear. His life was a celebration of "The Marriage of Wisdom and Method": which is the title of one of his essays.

== Bibliography ==
- The Way and the Mountain: Tibet, Buddhism, and Tradition (World Wisdom, 2008), ISBN 978-1-933316-53-6
- The Spiritual Ascent: A Compendium of the World's Wisdom (Fons Vitae, 2008), ISBN 978-1-887752-04-6
- A Buddhist Spectrum: Contributions to the Christian-Buddhist Dialogue (World Wisdom, 2004), ISBN 978-0-941532-40-2
- Peaks and Lamas: A Classic Book on Mountaineering, Buddhism and Tibet (Shoemaker & Hoard, 2004), ISBN 978-1-59376-058-8
- Sikkim (Cosmo, 2003), ISBN 978-81-7020-759-7
- Ladakh (Cosmo, 2002), ISBN 978-81-7020-756-6

== See also ==
- Perennial philosophy
- Titus Burckhardt
- Hossein Nasr
- Martin Lings
- Huston Smith
- Jean-Louis Michon
- Jean Borella
- Elémire Zolla
