= Algis Uždavinys =

Lithuanian philosopher

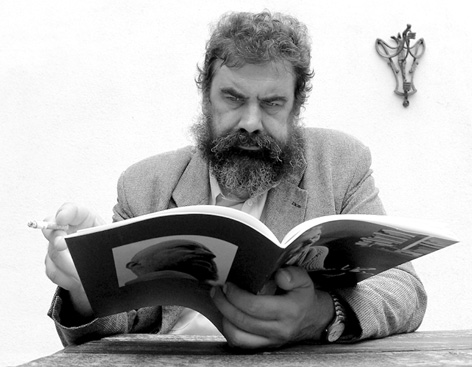
- Born: 26 April 1962; Vilnius, Lithuania
- Died: 25 July 2010 (aged 48); Kabeliai, Lithuania
- Occupation(s): Philosopher, scholar

Academic work
- Main interests: Metaphysics, Western esotericism, Eastern esotericism, symbolism, mythology, Sufism, Greek philosophy, Neoplatonism, religious texts, comparative religion
- Notable ideas: Critique of modern classical scholarship; essential unity of Egyptian, Greek and Islamic mysticisms

Algis Uždavinys (1962–2010) was a Lithuanian philosopher and scholar. His work pioneered the hermeneutical comparative study of Egyptian and Greek religions, especially their esoteric relations to Semitic religions, and in particular the inner aspect of Islam (Sufism). His books have been published in Lithuanian, Russian, English, French and Spanish, including translations of Plotinus, Frithjof Schuon and Ananda Coomaraswamy into Russian and Lithuanian.

== Early life ==
Born in Vilnius then brought up in Druskininkai by the Neman in southern Lithuania, Uždavinys moved again to Vilnius to pursue studies at the former State Art Institute of Lithuania, now Vilnius Academy of Arts.

== Career ==
Upon graduation he came in contact with the writings and authors of the Traditionalist or Perennialist school, and this influenced his comparative exegesis, notably his studies on Sufism, the Ancient Egyptian religion, and his assertion of the substantial continuity of Greek philosophical tradition from Pythagoras down to the latest Neoplatonic authors. In this last claim he was expressly indebted to Pierre Hadot.

Uždavinys was an active member of the editorial board of the journal Acta Orientalia Vilnensia and head of the department of humanities at the Vilnius Academy of Arts, Kaunas faculty; as an art critic, philosopher and intellectual he was a prominent figure in Lithuanian cultural life. In 2008 he spent time as a research fellow at La Trobe University in Bendigo, Australia.

He was a member of the International Society for Neoplatonic Studies and The Lithuanian Artists' Association, and a regular contributor to journals such as Sacred Web, Vancouver, and Sophia, Washington, D.C.

== Death ==
Uždavinys died in his sleep of an apparent heart attack on 25 July 2010 in his native village of Kabeliai.

== Personal life ==
He is survived by his wife Virginija (or Virginia), and their two daughters.

== Works ==
=== Books in English ===
- The Golden Chain: An Anthology of Platonic and Pythagorean Philosophy (World Wisdom, 2004) ISBN 978-0-941532-61-7. Introduction.
- Philosophy as a Rite of Rebirth: From Ancient Egypt to Neoplatonism (The Matheson Trust and Prometheus Trust, 2008) ISBN 978-1-898910-35-0. A free sizeable excerpt.
- The Heart of Plotinus: The Essential Enneads (World Wisdom, 2009) ISBN 978-1-935493-03-7.
- Philosophy and Theurgy in Late Antiquity (Sophia Perennis, 2010) ISBN 978-1-59731-086-4.
- Ascent to Heaven in Islamic and Jewish Mysticism (The Matheson Trust, 2011) ISBN 978-1-908092-02-1. excerpt
- Orpheus and the Roots of Platonism (The Matheson Trust, 2011) ISBN 978-1-908092-07-6. excerpt
- Sufism and Ancient Wisdom (Archetype and The Matheson Trust, 2020) ISBN 978-1-901383-37-9.
- Hermes Trismegistus: The Way of Wisdom, London, The Matheson Trust, 2025.

==== Academic Monographs in Lithuanian ====
- Labyrinth of Sources. Hermeneutical Philosophy and Mystagogy of Proclus (Versmių labirintai: Proklo hermeneutinė filosofija ir mistagogija), Vilnius: Lithuanian State Institute of Philosophy and Sociology, Eurigmas, 2002, ISBN 9986-523-88-5.
- Hellenic Philosophy from Numenius to Syrianus, Vilnius: Lithuanian State Institute of Culture, Philosophy, and Arts, 2003. ISBN 9986-638-40-2
- Hermes Trismegistus: The Way of Wisdom (Hermio Trismegisto išminties kelias), Vilnius: Sophia, 2005. ISBN 9986-9351-3X
- The Problem of the Interpretation of Symbols and Images in Ancient Civilisations (Simbolių ir atvaizdų interpretacijos problema senovės civilizacijose), Vilnus, Sophia, 2006. ISBN 9986-9351-5-6
- Sufism in Islamic Civilisation (Sufizmas islamo civilizacijoje), Kaunas: Atvirosios visuomenės studijų asociacija, 2007. ISBN 9789-9559-91106
- The Egyptian Book of the Dead, Kaunas: Ramduva, 2008. ISBN 978-9955-524-06-9

=== Chapters ===
- "From Homer to the Glorious Qur’an: Hermeneutical Strategies in the Hellenistic and Islamic Traditions," Sacred Web, vol. 11, 2003.
- "The Egyptian Book of the Dead and Neoplatonic Philosophy," History of Platonism, Plato Redivivus, eds. Robert Berchman and John Finamore. New Orleans: University Press of the South, 2005.
- "Chaldean Divination and the Ascent to Heaven," in Seeing with Different Eyes: Essays in Astrology and Divination, eds. Patrick Curry and Angela Voss, Cambridge: Cambridge Scholars Publishing, 2007.

=== Articles ===
- "Putting on the Form of the Gods: Sacramental Theurgy in Neoplatonism", Sacred Web vol. 5, 2000, pp. 107–120.
- "Sufism in the Light of Orientalism", Research Institute of Culture, Philosophy, and Arts, 2007.
- "Voices of Fire: Understanding Theurgy", Eye of the Heart, Vol 1, 2008.
- "Metaphysical symbols and their function in theurgy", Eye of the Heart, Vol 2, 2008.

== See also ==
- Perennial philosophy
- Frithjof Schuon
- Titus Burckhardt
- Martin Lings
- Seyyed Hossein Nasr
- Peter Kingsley
