= DP Mukerji =

Indian sociologist

Dhurjati Prasad Mukerji
- Born: 5 October 1894; Chatra, Sreerampur, Bengal Presidency, British India
- Died: 5 December 1961; Calcutta, West Bengal, India
- Citizenship: Indian
- Occupation: Indian professor
- Known for: Sociologist
- Spouse: Chhaya Mukerji
- Children: Pt.Kumar Prasad Mukerji
- Parent(s): Bhupatinath Mukerji (Father); Elokeshi Devi (Mother)

Dhurjati Prasad Mukerji (5 October 1894 – 5 December 1961), known as DP Mukerji, was an Indian professor and sociologist. He was known for works and lectures focused on sociology and Marxism.

== Early life ==
DP Mukerji was born to Bhupatinath Mukherjee and Elokeshi Devi at his maternal uncle's house at Chatra near Sreerampur in the district of Hoogli in Bengal Presidency during British rule in India. Their ancestral house was at village Narayanpur near Bhatpara in the North Twenty four Parganas District of West Bengal.His father, Bhupatinath Mukhopadhyay, was a lawyer of Barasat and therefore his schooling till 1909 was at Barasat Govt. High School from where he passed Entrance examination.

== Education and career ==
In 1912 Mukerji passed Intermediate from Ripon College now Surendranath College at Calcutta and obtained a Master's in history in 1918 and Master's in Economics in 1920 from the University of Calcutta.He married Chhaya Devi, a daughter of Prabodhchandra Bandyopadhyay, a resident of Allahabad. He started his teaching career at Bangabasi College, Calcutta but soon he got an offer from the newly founded University of Lucknow where he joined as a lecturer in Economics and Sociology in 1922. He served the University of Lucknow for over three decades (1922–1954), Dr Zakir Husain, Vice Chancellor Aligarh Muslim University invited him to join Department of Economics Aligarh Muslim University as Professor in 1954.

Mukerji was arguably one of the leading intellectuals of his times who impacted life and thoughts of his many students such as P. C. Joshi, T. N. Madan, Ashok Mitra, A. K. Saran, and V. B. Singh. He was invited to write the very first editorial in the very first number of Economic Weekly (Economic and Political Weekly) in 1949, titled "Light without Heat."

He worked for the UP government under Govind Ballabh Pant (1937–40) as Director of Information and created Bureau of Economics and Statistics. He served as a member of the UP Government Labour Enquiry Committee (1944). He went to the USSR in 1952 and to the Netherlands in 1953 as a visiting professor at the Institute of Social Sciences.

Mukerji made a pioneering contribution in the field of sociology and economics. He had a deep interest in literature, music, and art as well. He was a novelist, essayist, and critic in his mother tongue, Bengali.

Along with R.K. Mukerjee, Mukerji established the All India Sociological Conference (AISC) and organized its first gathering in 1955.

== Death ==
In 1956 DP underwent major surgery for throat cancer in Switzerland. He survived cancer, but his voice was badly impacted. He continued serving Aligarh Muslim University until 1959 after which he retired to live in Dehradun. DP died in Kolkata on 5 December 1961.

== Publications ==
A collection of his essays, Redefining Humanism was published by Srobona Munshi which was well received in academic circle and help establish Prof. Mukerji's image as one of the top intellectuals of modern India.

Writings :

Mukerji wrote nineteen books: ten in Bengali and nine in English. His early publications include:

- Basic Concepts in Sociology (1932)
- Sur o Sungati (1935). Co-written with Rabindranath Tagore.
- Personality and the Social Sciences (1924)
- Indian Music: An Introduction (1945)
- Modern Indian Culture: A Sociological Study (1942, revised enlarged edition in 1948)
- Problems of Indian Youth (1942)
- Views and Counterviews (1946).
- On Indian History (1944)
- Diversities
- Realist
- Anthashila (1935)
- Abarta (1937)
- Mohana (1934)
- Amra O Tahara (1931)
- Mone Elo
- Jhilimili
- Chinatasi (1934)
- Katha O Sur (1938)
