= Christophe Royon =

French–American physicist

- Awards: Humboldt Prize

Academic background
- Education: BSc, 1990, Ecole Normale Supérieure; PhD, University of Orsay

Christophe Royon is a French–American physicist who specializes in dark matter. He is a Foundation Distinguished Professor in the Department of Physics and Astronomy at the University of Kansas.

== Early life and education ==
Royon earned the level of Aggregation of Physics and Master in Quantum Physics at Ecole Normale Superieure in 1990 and 1991 before enrolling at the University in Orsay for a PhD in physics.

== Career ==
In 2016, Royon joined the Department of Physics and Astronomy at the University of Kansas as a Foundation Distinguished Professor. As a result of his rank, he received startup money to put together a team of researchers to work on discovering odderon. The researchers discovered the quasiparticle as a result of analyzing proton collisions at high speeds. In the same year, Royon was the recipient of the Humboldt Prize for his "pioneering work." In 2019, Royon earned a grant from NASA to design and build a particle telescope to launch into orbit aboard a satellite. He also received another grant to investigate interactions between quarks and gluons to better understand gluon saturation.

== Recognition and awards ==
In September 2022 Dr. Royon was awarded the gold medal of the Mexican Physical Society, Division of Particle and Fields, highest recognition in Mexico for research and contributions in high energy physics. The award was granted due to his leadership in the odderon state discovery and also to the search for beyond standard model physics using intact protons at the LHC. Such result involved a delicate process that required international collaboration between D0 and TOTEM experiments at the Tevratron laboratory in USA and CERN laboratory in Switzerland. Dr. Royon was also recognized due to his support and collaborations with Mexican groups in the context of the CMS experiment and Medical Physics, projects in where he has supervised students from Mexico and South America.
