= Common Ground Project =

The Common Ground between Islam and Buddhism project is an interfaith initiative originated by the Dalai Lama and Prince Ghazi bin Muhammad of Jordan. These two were joined by a panel of select scholars, and the project was officially launched on May 12, 2010, in Bloomington, Indiana, US. The project is based on the book Common Ground between Islam and Buddhism, by Reza Shah-Kazemi, who together with Ingrid Mattson and Eboo Patel was part of the scholars’ panel convened for the Bloomington event.

== History ==
In May 2010, the Dalai Lama was in Bloomington giving a teaching on the Buddhist Heart Sutra. As previously arranged, partly through the mediation of Fons Vitae (publishers in Louisville, Kentucky), he took time out to meet with a small group of Muslim and interfaith leaders to launch the new book, and the new initiative.

== Content ==
In his foreword to the book, the Dalai Lama writes, “This is an important and pioneering book, which seeks to find common ground between the teachings of Islam and of Buddhism. It is my hope that on the basis of this common ground, followers of each tradition may come to appreciate the spiritual truths their different paths entail and from this develop a basis for respect for each other's practice and beliefs. This may not have occurred very often before, because there has been so little opportunity for real understanding between these two great traditions. This book attempts to set that right.”

Sections of the book include, among others, the following: “The Buddha as Messenger”, “Oneness: The Highest Common Denominator”, “Shūnya and Shahāda”, “Detachment: Anicca and Zuhd”, “The ‘god’ of Desire" and “The Common Ground of Sanctity”.

== Reception ==
Apart from notes in The Washington Post, local press and some Buddhist journals, and in spite of the involvement of international leaders like the Dalai Lama and Prince Ghazi bin Muhammad, this project was and has remained practically ignored by the media.

== See also ==
- Berkley Center for Religion, Peace, and World Affairs
- Comparative religion
- Elijah Interfaith Institute
- Jordanian Interfaith Coexistence Research Center
- The Matheson Trust
- United Religions Initiative
