= Odderon =

Particle physics family of odd-gluon states

- Composition: Odd number of gluons
- Family: Hadrons
- Interactions: Strong
- Symbol: O
- Antiparticle: Self
- Theorized: Basarab Nicolescu and Leszek Łukaszuk (October 1973)
- Discovered: Tamás Csörgő, Tamás Novák, Roman Pasechnik, András Ster and István Szanyi; DØ and TOTEM Collaborations

In particle physics, the odderon corresponds to an elusive family of odd-gluon states, dominated by a three-gluon state. When protons collide elastically with other protons or with anti-protons at high energies, gluons are exchanged. Exchanging an even number of gluons is a crossing-even part of elastic proton–proton and proton–antiproton scattering, while odderon exchange (i.e. exchange of odd number of gluons) corresponds to a crossing-odd term in the elastic scattering amplitude. In turn, the odderon's crossing-odd counterpart is the pomeron.

It took about 48 years to find a definite signal of odderon exchange.

== Description ==
In elastic collisions, the total kinetic energy of the system is conserved. Thus the identity of the scattered particles is not modified, no excited states and/or new particles are produced. The kinematics of these collisions is governed by the conservation of both energy and momentum.

Data on high-energy elastic proton–proton collisions provided by the TOTEM Collaboration in a teraelectronvolt energy range, together with data from the DØ experiment on elastic proton–antiproton collisions at the Tevatron collider were key ingredients in the discovery of the odderon-exchange. The observed characteristics of the proton–proton collisions did not match the characteristics of the proton–antiproton collisions. As a result, there is an interaction-mediating family of particles (Regge trajectory) that can result in such a deviation in the range of strong interactions.

== Discovery ==
The first paper on the theoretical prediction of possible odderon exchange was published in 1973 by Basarab Nicolescu and Leszek Łukaszuk. The odderon name was coined in 1975 in a paper from the same group (Joynson, D.; Leader, E.; Nicolescu, B. and Lopez, C.)

In December 2020, the DØ and TOTEM Collaborations made public their CERN and Fermilab approved preprint later published in Physical Review Letters in August 2021. The DØ and TOTEM extrapolated TOTEM proton–proton data in the region of the diffractive minimum and maximum from 13, 8, 7 and 2.76 TeV to 1.96 TeV and compared this to DØ proton–antiproton measurement at 1.96 TeV in the same t-range finding an odderon significance of 3.4 σ. TOTEM observed an independent odderon signal at low four-momentum transfers at 13 TeV. When a partial combination of the TOTEM ρ and total cross section measurements is done at 13 TeV, the combined significance ranges between 3.4 and 4.6 σ for the different models. Combining this with the 3.4 σ effect on the extrapolated proton–proton differential cross-sections resulted in an at least 5.2 σ statistical significance. This is the first statistically significant observation of odderon exchange effects by experimental collaborations.

A Hungarian-Swedish scaling analysis introduced a new scaling function and observed, model dependently, that in a limited energy range, that includes the DØ energy of 1.96 TeV and the TOTEM energies of 2.76 and 7 TeV, the elastic proton–proton collisions are within the experimental uncertainties independent of the energy of the collision.

In this model dependently determined domain of validity, the Hungarian-Swedish team utilized a direct data-to-data comparison and showed that energy independent scaling function of elastic proton–proton collisions is significantly different from the scaling function of elastic proton–antiproton collisions, hence providing a statistically significant signal for the exchange of the elusive odderon. The preprint of this analysis was made public in December 2019 and its final form it was published in February 2021.

This paper has been seconded in July 2021 by a theoretical paper of Tamás Csörgő, and István Szanyi, increasing the statistical significance of odderon observation to at least 7.08 σ signal. This paper utilized a previously published theoretical model, the so-called real-extended Bialas-Bzdak model, to extrapolate not only the elastic proton–proton scattering data from the LHC energies to the DØ energy of 1.96 TeV but also to extrapolate the elastic proton–antiproton scattering data from 0.546 and 1.96 TeV to the LHC energies of 2.76 TeV and 7 TeV. Evaluating the proton–proton data with a model increased the uncertainty and decreased the odderon signal from proton–proton scattering data alone, but this decrease was well over-compensated with the ability of the model to evaluate theoretically the proton–antiproton scattering at the LHC energies, leading to an overall increase of the statistical significance from 6.26 to 7.08 σ signal.

== Chronology of articles discovering odderon exchange ==
Authors	Submitted for publication	Accepted for publication	Published	Article reference
Tamás Csörgő, Tamás Novák, Roman Pasechnik, András Ster, István Szanyi	15 Apr 2020	11 May 2020	16 Jun 2020	EPJ Web of Conferences 235, 06002 (2020)
Tamás Csörgő, Tamás Novák, Roman Pasechnik, András Ster, István Szanyi	29 Dec 2019	12 Jan 2021	23 Feb 2021	Eur. Phys. J. C 81, 180 (2021)
Tamás Csörgő and István Szanyi	6 Aug 2020	25 Jun 2021	13 Jul 2021	Eur. Phys. J. C 81, 611 (2021)
D0 and TOTEM experimental collaborations	7 Dec 2020	10 Jun 2021	4 Aug 2021	Phys. Rev. Lett. 127, 062003(2021)

== See also ==
- Glueball

== Bibliography ==
- 1972: first proposal: Efremov, A. V.; Peschanski, R. (1972). "Evidence for new singularities in Regge phenomenology". OSTI 4691439.
- 1973: first publication: Łukaszuk, L.; Nicolescu, B. (1973). "A possible interpretation of pp rising total cross-sections". Lettere al Nuovo Cimento. 8 (7): 405–413. doi:10.1007/BF02824484.
- 1975: odderon named: Joynson, D.; Leader, E.; Nicolescu, B.; Lopez, C. (1975). "Non-regge and hyper-regge effects in pion-nucleon charge exchange scattering at high energies". Il Nuovo Cimento A. 30 (3): 345–384. Bibcode:1975NCimA..30..345J. doi:10.1007/BF02730293.
- 1980: odderon evolution equation from QCD: Kwieciǹski, J.; Praszałowicz, M. (1980). "Three gluon integral equation and odd C singlet Regge singularities in QCD". Physics Letters B. 94 (3): 413–416. Bibcode:1980PhLB...94..413K. doi:10.1016/0370-2693(80)90909-0.
- 1990: Pomeron and odderon in QCD: Lipatov, L.N. (1990). "Pomeron and odderon in QCD and a two dimensional conformal field theory". Physics Letters B. 251 (2): 284–287. Bibcode:1990PhLB..251..284L. doi:10.1016/0370-2693(90)90937-2.
- 1999: a new odderon intercept from QCD: Janik, R. A.; Wosiek, J. (1999). "A Solution of the Odderon Problem". Physical Review Letters. 82 (6): 1092–1095. arXiv:hep-th/9802100. Bibcode:1999PhRvL..82.1092J. doi:10.1103/PhysRevLett.82.1092.
- 2000: odderon from QCD with fixed coupling constant: Bartels, J.; Lipatov, L.N.; Vacca, G.P. (2000). "A new odderon solution in perturbative QCD". Physics Letters B. 477 (1–3): 178–186. arXiv:hep-ph/9912423. Bibcode:2000PhLB..477..178B. doi:10.1016/S0370-2693(00)00221-5.
- 2003: Odderon in Quantum Chromo Dynamics: Ewerz, Carlo (2003). "The Odderon in Quantum Chromodynamics". arXiv:hep-ph/0306137.
- 2007: Proposal to find the odderon at RHIC and at LHC: Avila, R.F.; Gauron, P.; Nicolescu, B. (2007). "How can the odderon be detected at RHIC and LHC?". The European Physical Journal C. 49 (2): 581–592. arXiv:hep-ph/0607089. Bibcode:2007EPJC...49..581A. doi:10.1140/epjc/s10052-006-0074-9.
- 2015: proposal to use LHC data to hunt down the odderon: Ster, András; Jenkovszky, László; Csörgő, Tamás (2015). "Extracting the Odderon from pp and pp̅ scattering data". Physical Review D. 91 (7) 074018. arXiv:1501.03860. Bibcode:2015PhRvD..91g4018S. doi:10.1103/PhysRevD.91.074018.
- 2015: Hatta, Y.; Iancu, E.; Itakura, K.; McLerran, L. (2005). "Odderon in the color glass condensate". Nuclear Physics A. 760 (1–2): 172–207. arXiv:hep-ph/0501171. Bibcode:2005NuPhA.760..172H. doi:10.1016/j.nuclphysa.2005.05.163.
- 2016: TOTEM Collaboration; et al. (2016). "Measurement of Elastic pp Scattering at √s = 8 TeV in the Coulomb-Nuclear Interference Region: Determination of the ρ-Parameter and the Total Cross-Section". The European Physical Journal C. 76 (12) 661. arXiv:1610.00603. Bibcode:2016EPJC...76..661A. doi:10.1140/epjc/s10052-016-4399-8.
- 2017: The TOTEM Collaboration; et al. (2017). "First measurement of elastic, inelastic and total cross-section at √s=13 TeV by TOTEM and overview of cross-section data at LHC energies". arXiv:1712.06153 [hep-ex].
- 2017: TOTEM Collaboration; et al. (2018). "First determination of the ρ parameter at √s = 13 TeV – probing the existence of a colourless three-gluon bound state". arXiv:1812.04732 [hep-ex].
- 2018: Antchev, G.; et al. (2020). "Elastic differential cross-section dσ/Dt at √s=2.76TeV and implications on the existence of a colourless C-odd three-gluon compound state". European Physical Journal C. 80 (2): 91. arXiv:1812.08610. Bibcode:2020EPJC...80...91A. doi:10.1140/epjc/s10052-020-7654-y.
- 2018: Antchev, G.; et al. (2019). "Elastic differential cross-section measurement at √s=13 TeV by TOTEM". European Physical Journal C. 79 (10): 861. arXiv:1812.08283. Bibcode:2019EPJC...79..861A. doi:10.1140/epjc/s10052-019-7346-7.
- 2019: Odderon from real-to-imaginary ratio at zero four-momentum transfer: Martynov, E.; Tersimonov, G. (2019). "Ratio ρp̅ppp(s) in Froissaron and maximal odderon approach". Physical Review D. 100 (11) 114039. arXiv:1911.06873. doi:10.1103/PhysRevD.100.114039.
- 2019: Szanyi, István; Bence, Norbert; Jenkovszky, László (2019). "New physics from TOTEM's recent measurements of elastic and total cross sections". Journal of Physics G: Nuclear and Particle Physics. 46 (5). arXiv:1808.03588. Bibcode:2019JPhG...46e5002S. doi:10.1088/1361-6471/ab1205.
- 2019: Csörgő, T.; Pasechnik, R.; Ster, A. (2019). "Odderon and proton substructure from a model-independent Lévy imaging of elastic pp and pp̅pp̅ collisions". The European Physical Journal C. 79 (1) 62. doi:10.1140/epjc/s10052-019-6588-8. PMC 6349816. PMID 30774536.
- 2019: Martynov, Evgenij; Nicolescu, Basarab (2019). "Odderon effects in the differential cross-sections at Tevatron and LHC energies". The European Physical Journal C. 79 (6) 461. arXiv:1808.08580. Bibcode:2019EPJC...79..461M. doi:10.1140/epjc/s10052-019-6954-6.
- 2020: Proposal to search for odderon in central exclusive production at LHC: Lebiedowicz, Piotr; Nachtmann, Otto; Szczurek, Antoni (2020). "Searching for the odderon in pp→ppK^{+}K^{−} and pp→ppμ^{+}μ^{−} reactions in the ϕ(1020) resonance region at the LHC". Physical Review D. 101 (9) 094012. arXiv:1911.01909. doi:10.1103/PhysRevD.101.094012.
- 2020: Bartels, Jochen; Contreras, Carlos; Vacca, Gian Paolo (2020). "The Odderon in QCD with running coupling". Journal of High Energy Physics (4) 183. arXiv:1910.04588. Bibcode:2020JHEP...04..183B. doi:10.1007/JHEP04(2020)183.
- 2021: Abazov, V. M.; et al. (2021). "Odderon Exchange from Elastic Scattering Differences between pp and pp̅ Data at 1.96 TeV and from pp Forward Scattering Measurements". Physical Review Letters. 127 (6) 062003. arXiv:2012.03981. Bibcode:2021PhRvL.127f2003A. doi:10.1103/PhysRevLett.127.062003. PMID 34420329.
- 2021: Csörgő, T.; Novák, T.; Pasechnik, R.; Ster, A.; Szanyi, I. (2021). "Evidence of Odderon-exchange from scaling properties of elastic scattering at TeV energies". The European Physical Journal C. 81 (2) 180. arXiv:1912.11968. Bibcode:2021EPJC...81..180C. doi:10.1140/epjc/s10052-021-08867-6.
