= Gai Eaton =

British Islamic scholar, historian and diplomat

Charles le Gai Eaton
- Born: 1 January 1921; Lausanne, Vaud, Switzerland
- Died: 26 February 2010 (aged 89)
- Resting place: Brookwood Cemetery
- Education: King's College, Cambridge
- Occupations: Academic; diplomat; historian; writer
- Spouses: Kay Clayton (m. 1944; div. 1950) Corah Hamilton (m. 1956; died 1984)
- Children: Leo Eaton (b. 1945); 3 from second marriage
- Relatives: J. E. Preston Muddock (grandfather)
- Writing career
- Period: 1949–2009
- Subject: Islam
- Notable works: King of the Castle: Choice and Responsibility in the Modern World (1977); Islam and the Destiny of Man (1985); Remembering God: Reflections on Islam (2000)
- Movement: Sufism
- Arabic name
- Personal (Ism): Ḥasan ʿAbd al-Ḥakīm حسن عبد الحكيم
- Patronymic (Nasab): Ibn Faransīs Ayrinṭun ٱبْن فَرَنْسِيس أَيْرِنْطُن
- Epithet (Laqab): Ghāy Ītūn غاي إيتون
- Toponymic (Nisba): Al-Inglīzī الإِنْجْلِيزِيّ

Charles le Gai Eaton (also known as Hasan le Gai Eaton or Hassan Abdul Hakeem; 1 January 1921 – 26 February 2010) was a British diplomat, writer, historian, and an Islamic scholar. He is perhaps best known for his 1985 book, Islam and the Destiny of Man.

== Life and career ==
=== Early life ===
Born in Lausanne, Switzerland, and raised in London under the name Gai, Eaton was the son of the married Englishman Francis Errington and his mistress, Ruth Frances Muddock; to hide her son's illegitimacy, Ruth claimed that she had been married to a Canadian, Charles Eaton (an invention of Errington's, by then supposedly deceased), and that Charles had fathered the child. Eaton knew Errington only as a friend of the family until the age of 16, when his mother revealed the truth of his parentage. Brought up agnostic, Eaton was educated at Charterhouse School and King's College, Cambridge, where he studied history and entered into a correspondence with the novelist Leo Myers.

=== Diplomatic career ===
Having been passed over for military service during World War II, in the late 1940s and early 1950s he worked as a lecturer, teacher and newspaper editor in Egypt (at Cairo University) and Jamaica, before joining the British Diplomatic Service in 1959. As a diplomat, Eaton's postings included the Colonial Office outpost in Jamaica and the Deputy High Commission office in Madras, India, as well as others in Trinidad and Ghana. Eaton returned to the UK permanently in 1974 and retired from his diplomatic career three years later.After retiring from diplomatic service in 1977, he spent the next 22 years as a consultant to the Islamic Cultural Centre in London, where he also edited the Islamic Quarterly Journal.

=== Academic career ===
In 1951, with the encouragement of the Sufi academic Martin Lings, Eaton converted to Islam. He was inducted into Lings' Darqawiyya Alwiyya tariqa in 1975. Eaton was a consultant to the Islamic Cultural Centre at Regent's Park Mosque in London for 22 years. In 1996, he served on the committee that drafted the constitution of the Muslim Council of Britain.

Eaton was frequently critical of mainstream British Muslim opinion, and believed that Muslims themselves should have overthrown Saddam Hussein in the 2000s. Regarding the 2003 invasion of Iraq, in an interview with Emel magazine, he stated, "I am very torn either way and I cannot quite make up my mind what I think ... [Saddam] was our monster, it should have been for us to deal with him. But we are so hopeless and helpless we leave it to other people who have their own motives and their own objectives. In the same article, Eaton called for the creation of a British Islamic identity: "It is time for the Muslims in Britain to settle down, to find their own way, to form a real community and to discover a specifically British way of living Islam. The constant arrival of uneducated, non English-speaking immigrants from the subcontinent makes that more difficult."

His works include The Richest Vein (1949), King of the Castle: Choice and Responsibility in the Modern World (1977), Islam and the Destiny of Man (1985; listed on Q News' list of "Ten Books to Take to University"), and Remembering God: Reflections on Islam (2000). He frequently contributed articles to the quarterly journal on comparative religion and traditional studies, Studies in Comparative Religion. Eaton's last book and autobiography, A Bad Beginning and the Path to Islam (2009), was published by Archetype in January 2010. Many British converts to Islam have been inspired by his books, which are also expositions of Islam for Western readers, both religious and secular.

Gai Eaton was an adherent of the Traditionalist School, along with Frithjof Schuon, Martin Lings and others.

=== Personal life ===
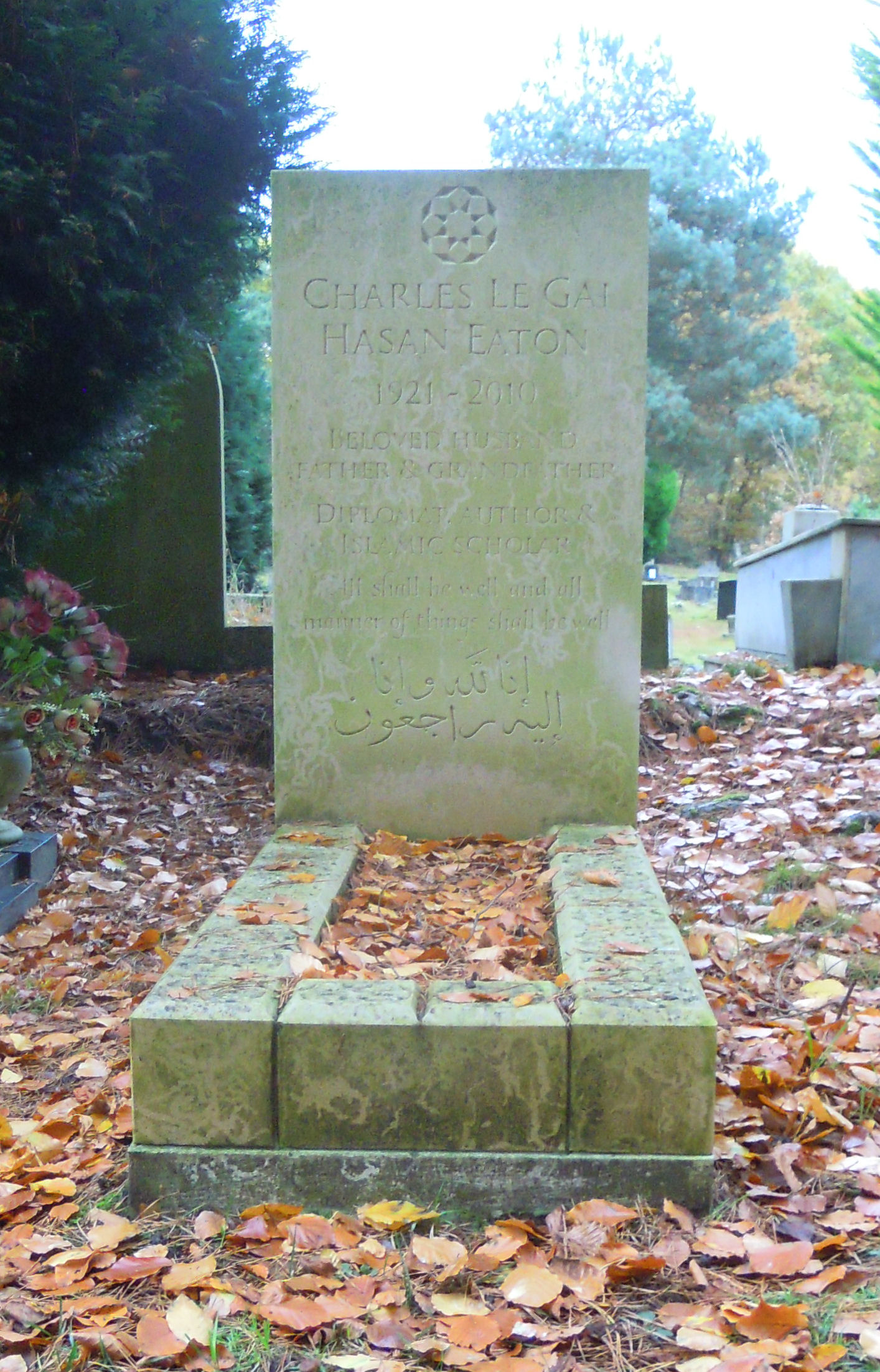
Gai Eaton's grave in Brookwood Cemetery

From his first marriage (1944–50) to the actress Kay Clayton, he was the father of Leo Eaton (b. 1945), an Emmy-winning director and producer of documentary films. In 1956, Eaton married Corah Hamilton, an expatriate Jamaican artist, with whom he had one son and two daughters; Hamilton died in 1984. Eaton was the grandson of the author and journalist J. E. Preston Muddock.

He is buried in the Muslim Section of Brookwood Cemetery.

== Bibliography ==
- Eaton, Gai (1977). King of the Castle: Choice and Responsibility in the Modern World. Cambridge: Islamic Texts Society. ISBN 9780946621217.
- Eaton, Gai (1985). Islam and the Destiny of Man. New York: State University of New York Press. ISBN 9780887061639.
- Eaton, Gai (1994). Remembering God: Reflections on Islam. Cambridge: Islamic Texts Society. ISBN 9780946621842.
- Eaton, Gai (2009). A Bad Beginning: The Path to Islam. London: Archetype Publications. ISBN 9781901383331.
- Le Gai Eaton, Charles (2013). Reflections. Cambridge: Islamic Texts Society. ISBN 9781903682821.
