= Basarab Nicolescu =

Romanian theoretical physicist (born 1942)

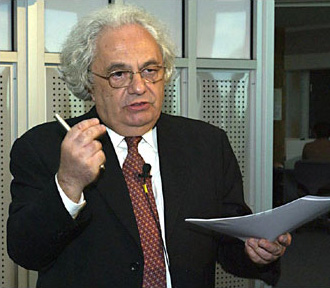
Basarab Nicolescu in 2009

Basarab Nicolescu (born March 25, 1942, Ploieşti, Romania) is an honorary theoretical physicist at the Centre National de la Recherche Scientifique (CNRS), Laboratoire de Physique Nucléaire et de Hautes Énergies, Université Pierre et Marie Curie, Paris. He is also a professor at the Babeş-Bolyai University, Cluj-Napoca, Romania and Docteur ès-Sciences Physiques (PhD), 1972, Université Pierre et Marie Curie, Paris. He was appointed Professor Extraordinary at Stellenbosch University, South Africa for the period 1 January 2011 to 31 December 2016 and was elected as Stellenbosch Institute for Advanced Study (STIAS) Fellow in 2011.

He is the president and founder of the International Center for Transdisciplinary Research and Studies (CIRET), a non-profit organization (167 members from 30 countries).

In addition, he is the co-founder, with René Berger, of the Study Group on Transdisciplinarity at UNESCO (1992) and the founder and Director of the "Transdisciplinarity" Series, Rocher Editions, Monaco and of the "Romanians of Paris", Piktos/Oxus Editions, Paris.

He is also a specialist in the theory of elementary particles. Basarab Nicolescu is the author of more than one hundred thirty articles in leading international scientific journals, has made numerous contributions to science anthologies and participated in several dozens French radio and multimedia documentaries on science.

Basarab Nicolescu is a major advocate of the transdisciplinary reconciliation between science and the humanities. He has published many articles on the role of science in contemporary culture in journals in France, Romania, Italy, United Kingdom, Brazil, Mexico, Argentina, Japan and in the USA.

The Academy of Transdisciplinary Learning and Advanced Studies (ATLAS), Texas, USA decided to institute the "Basarab Nicolescu Transdisciplinary Science & Engineering Award". The first prizes were attributed in 2014.

== See also ==
- Odderon

== Biographical profile ==
- Cristina Nunez, Irmgard Rehaag, Alejandro Sanchez y Enrique Vargas (Ed.), Transdisciplinariedad y sostenibilidad - Encuentro con Basarab Nicolescu, Universidad Veracruzana - Editores de la Nada, Xalapa, Mexico, 2011
- Romanians in Western European science and culture, American-Romanian Academy of Arts and Sciences, Vol. 13, Davis, CA, USA, 1992
- Anthology of Romanian associations and Romanian cultural personalities in exile 1940–1990, 2nd edition, Romanian Institute of Historical Research, San Diego, CA, USA, 1991
- Universalia 1986, Section « Culture et œuvres – Les faits culturels », Encyclopedia Universalis, Paris, 1986

== Awards and prizes ==
- Member of the Romanian Academy, 2001
- Doctor Honoris Causa of University of Veracruz, Mexico, "Alexandru Ioan Cuza" University, Iaşi, Romania, Technical University of Cluj-Napoca, Romania, "Vasile Goldiş" University, Arad, Romania and "George Bacovia" University, Bacau, Romania, Petroleum - Gas University, Ploieşti, Romania, University of Craiova, Craiova, Romania.
- The Academy of Transdisciplinary Learning and Advanced Studies (ATLAS) Gold Medal of Honor, 2014
- Great Officer, Faithful Service Order, Romania, 2002
- Honorary citizenship of the cities of Cluj-Napoca, Iaşi and Ploieşti, Romania
- Prize of the Union of Writers of Romania, 1993
- The ATLAS Ramamoorthy§Yeh Transdisciplinary Distinguished Award, USA, 2010
- "Inter-Balkan Cultural Association - Rigas' Charta" Award, Athens, Greece, 2007
- Benjamin Franklin Award for Best History Book, USA, 1992, for the book Science, Meaning and Evolution - The Cosmology of Jacob Boehme
- Silver Medal of the French Academy, 1986, for the book Nous, la particule et le monde. The same book has been selected by "Universalia 1986", Encyclopedia Universalis Editions
- Gold Medal at the First International Olympiad of Mathematics, Braşov, Romania, 1959
- Opera Omnia Prize, Nichita Stănescu International Festival, Romania, 2006

== Books and texts in English ==
- From Modernity to Cosmodernity - Science, Culture, and Spirituality, State University of New York (SUNY) Press, New York, USA, 2014. Review: https://dx.doi.org/10.17646/KOME.2016.19
- Transdisciplinarity - Theory and Practice (Ed.), Hampton Press, Cresskill, NJ, USA, 2008.
- Manifesto of Transdisciplinarity, State University of New York (SUNY) Press, New York, 2002, translated from the French by Karen-Claire Voss. Review
- Science, Meaning and Evolution - The Cosmology of Jacob Boehme, with selected texts by Jacob Boehme, translated from the French by Rob Baker, foreword by Joscelyn Godwin, afterword by Antoine Faivre, Parabola Books, New York, 1991.
- "A New Vision of the World - Transdisciplinarity", in The Design and Delivery of Inter- and Pluridisciplinary Research, Proceedings of the Muscipoli Workshop Two, The Danish Institute for Studies in Research and Research Policy, Denmark, 2002, pp. 108–111.
- "In vitro and in vivo knowledge", in Unità del sapere e del fare: una soluzione transdisciplinare?, Istituto per Ricerche ed Attività Educative, Napoli, Italie, 2001, pp. 81–100, sous la direction de Ezio Mariani.
- "Transdisciplinarity and Complexity: Levels of Reality as Source of Indeterminacy", in Determinismo e Complessità, Armando Editore, Roma, 2000, pp. 127–142, edited by F. Tito Arecchi.
- "Hylemorphism, Quantum Physics and Levels of Reality", in Aristotle and Contemporary Science, Vol. I, Peter Lang, New York, 2000, pp. 173–184, edited by Demetra Sfendoni-Mentzou, introduction by Hilary Putnam.
- "Gödelian Aspects of Nature and Knowledge", in Systems - New Paradigms for the Human Sciences, De Gruyter, Berlin, 1998, translation from French by Karen-Claire Voss, pp. 385–403, edited by Gabriel Altmann and Walter A. Koch.
- "Levels of Representation and Levels of Reality: Towards an Ontology of Science", in The Concept of Nature in Science and Theology (part II), in collaboration with Michel Camus, Thierry Magnin et Karen-Claire Voss, Éditions Labor et Fides, Genève, 1998, pp. 94–103, edited by Niels H. Gregersen, Michael W.S. Parsons and Christoph Wassermann.
- "Peter Brook and Traditional Thought", in Contemporary Theater Review, Vol.7, Part 1, 1997, Harwood Academic Publishers, Amsterdam, translated from the French by David Williams (translated also into Japanese).
- "In the Valley of Astonishment, an interview with Basarab Nicolescu" by Jean Biès, in Parabola, Vol.XXII, No.4, Winter 1997, New York.
- "Levels of Complexity and Levels of Reality", in The Emergence of Complexity in Mathematics, Physics, Chemistry, and Biology, Proceedings of the Plenary Session of the Pontifical Academy of Sciences, 27–31 October 1992, Casina Pio IV, Vatican, Pontificia Academia Scientiarum Editions, Vatican City, 1996 (distributed by Princeton University Press).
- "Science as Testimony", in Science and the Boundaries of Knowledge, Proceedings of the Venice Symposium, UNESCO Editions, Paris, 1986 (translated into Spanish and many other languages)

== Books and texts in other languages ==
=== Spanish ===
- Article La necesidad de la transdisciplinariedad en la educación superior, in Trans-pasando Fronteras, No. 3, 2013, ISSN 2248-7212. Cali, Colombia: Universidad Icesi (URL visited on 9 January 2014).
- Article La evolución transdisciplinaria del aprendizaje en Trans-pasando Fronteras, No. 4, 2013, ISSN 2248-7212. Cali, Colombia: Universidad Icesi (URL visited on 25 July 2014).

== Editor of collective works ==
- Transdisciplinarity - Theory and Practice, Hampton Press, USA? 2008
- Trans- and Interdisciplinary Education and Research, (2017) Dieleman Hans, Basarab Nicolescu and Atila Ertas (ed.), ISBN 978-0-9998733-0-4, TheAtlas 2017
