= Tamás Csörgő =

Hungarian theoretical physicist

Tamás Csörgő (born 1963) is a Hungarian theoretical physicist known for his contributions to high-energy particle physics and quantum chromodynamics (QCD). He is associated with research on elastic proton–proton scattering and was part of a research group (with Tamás Novák, Roman Pasechnik, András Ster, and István Szanyi) that provided evidence supporting the experimental discovery of the odderon, a theoretical prediction in strong interaction physics.

== Early life and education ==
Csörgő was born in 1963 in Gyöngyös, Hungary. In 1983, he won first prize in the Loránd Eötvös National Physics Competition in Hungary, a prestigious academic competition for secondary school students.

== Research and career ==
Csörgő's research focuses on theoretical particle physics, including quantum chromodynamics, relativistic hydrodynamics, and high-energy collision phenomena. His work has contributed to the theoretical interpretation of experimental results from large-scale particle physics collaborations, including those conducted at CERN.

In 2021, results from the TOTEM experiment at CERN provided evidence for the odderon, a charge-conjugation-odd compound state predicted by QCD. Csörgő and collaborators published theoretical analyses supporting the interpretation of the experimental data as evidence of odderon exchange.

== Honors and awards ==
Csörgő has received several academic recognitions, including:

- First Prize, Loránd Eötvös National Physics Competition (1983)
- Charles Simonyi Fellowship, Charles Simonyi Foundation (2012)
- Co-recipient of the 2025 Breakthrough Prize as part of CERN experiment collaborations
