= A. K. Saran =

Indian scholar, writer and sociologist

Awadh Kishore Saran (1922–2003), popularly known as A. K. Saran, was an Indian scholar, editor, and writer who was one of the most influential voices on traditionalist thoughts in the Hindu world.

== Career ==
Saran's works frequently featured traditionalists and perennialist philosophers such as Frithjof Schuon and, in particular, Ananda K. Coomaraswamy, whom Saran first encountered when he was ten years old. He served as a professor of sociology at the University of Lucknow in Lucknow, India and held the Gamaliel chair in peace and justice at the Cardinal Stritch University in Milwaukee, Wisconsin.

== Works ==
- Traditional thought: Toward an axiomatic approach : a book on reminders (Samyag-vak special series) (1996)
- Illuminations: A School for the Regeneration of Man's Experience, Imagination, and Intellectual Integrity : a Proposal (in Two Parts) (1996)
- On the Intellectual Vocation: A Rosary of Edifying Texts with an Analytical-elucidatory Essay (1996)
- Sociology of knowledge and traditional thought (Samyag-vāk special series) (1998)
- Traditional Vision of Man (1998)
- Takamori Lecture: The Crisis of Mankind : an Inquiry Into Originally/novelty, Power/violence (1999)
- The Marxian theory of social change : a logico-philosophical critique (2000)
- Meaning and Truth; Lectures on the Theory of Language : A Prolegomena to the General Theory of Society and Culture (2003)
- Environmental Psychology (2005)
- On the Theories of Secularism and Modernization (Samyak-Vak Special Series, 9) (2007)

== See also ==
- Seyyed Hossein Nasr
- Reza Shah-Kazemi
- Leo Schaya
- Philip Sherrard
- Wolfgang Smith
- William Stoddart
- Michel Valsan
- Elémire Zolla
