= Islamic Cultural Centre =

The Islamic Cultural Centre is a centre for Muslims located in London, England, opened in 1944. It is part of the London Central Mosque, having been annexed. It campaigns on behalf of British Muslims to government, local authorities and official bodies on issues such as health, welfare and education, among others.

The Islamic Cultural Centre is the place where Charles le Gai Eaton converted to Islam.

== See also ==
- Islam in the United Kingdom
