= Harry Oldmeadow =

Australian academic

Kenneth "Harry" Oldmeadow (born 1947) is an Australian academic, author, editor and educator whose works focus on religion, tradition, traditionalist writers and philosophy.

== Life and career ==
Oldmeadow was born in Melbourne in 1947. His parents were Christian missionaries in India and he spent the first nine years of his childhood there and developed an early interest in the civilisations of the East.

Oldmeadow studied history, politics and literature at the Australian National University, graduating in 1968 with First Class Honours in History, and the University of Sydney, as well as working as a history tutor at La Trobe University in Melbourne. In 1971 a Commonwealth Overseas Research Scholarship allowed him to study at the University of Oxford, followed by extensive travel in Europe and North Africa.

In 1980 he achieved a master's degree in religious studies at the University of Sydney where he completed a dissertation on the work of Frithjof Schuon and the other principal traditionalist writers. This study was awarded the University of Sydney Medal for excellence in research and was eventually published by the Sri Lanka Institute of Traditional Studies under the title Traditionalism: Religion in the Light of the Perennial Philosophy (Colombo, 2000). Under the auspices of this institute, Oldmeadow delivered the Inaugural Ananda Coomaraswamy Memorial Lecture in Colombo on "The Religious Tradition of the Australian Aborigines".

Oldmeadow was the Co-ordinator of Philosophy and Religious Studies at La Trobe University, Bendigo, where he also taught Literature and Cinema Studies. He has published extensively in such journals as Sacred Web (Vancouver), Sophia (Washington DC) and Asian Philosophy (Nottingham, UK). In late 2001, he was a key speaker at a large interfaith gathering in Sydney organised by the Australian Centre for Sufism; the theme of the meeting was the need for interreligious understanding in the wake of the 11 September 2001 attacks.

== Bibliography ==
Books

- The Betrayal of Tradition (Bloomington: World Wisdom, 2003)
- Journeys East: 20th Century Western Encounters with Eastern Religious Traditions. World Wisdom, Inc. 2004. ISBN 9780941532570.
- (Editor), The Betrayal of Tradition: Essays on the Spiritual Crisis of Modernity. Bloomington: World Wisdom, Inc. 2005. ISBN 9780941532556.
- Light from the East: Eastern Wisdom for the Modern West. World Wisdom, Inc. 2007. ISBN 9781933316222.
- A Christian Pilgrim in India: The Spiritual Journey of Swami Abhishiktananda (Henri Le Saux). World Wisdom. 2007. ISBN 9781933316451.
- Frithjof Schuon and the Perennial Philosophy. World Wisdom. 2010. ISBN 9781935493099.
- Traditionalism: Religion in the Light of Perennial Philosophy. Sri Lanka Institute of Traditional Studies: Sophia Perennis. 2011. ISBN 9781597311311.
- Occultism & Religion: in Freud, Jung and Mircea Eliade (in Portuguese. Co-authored with Mateus Soares de Azevedo). São Paulo: Ibrasa, 2011. ISBN 978-85-348-0336-6
- Black Elk : The Oglala Holy Man and Sioux Tradition. World Wisdom. 2018. ISBN 9781936597604.
- Leaves in the Wind (a memoir), Bendigo: Carbarita Press, 2022.
- Timeless Truths and Modern Delusions: The Perennial Philosophy as a Guide for contemporary Buddhists, Melbourne: Platform, 2021.
- Gleanings: A Miscellany (essays and reviews, Bendigo: Carbarita Press, 2021.
- Against the Tide: Modern Christian Thinkers, Bendigo: Carbarita Press, 2022.
- Persons of Interest: People, Books, Ideas, Encounters, Bendigo: Carbarita Press, 2023.
- The Frenzy on the Wall: 701 Must-See Films (2 volumes), Bendigo: Carbarita Press, 2023.
- The Realm of Splendour: Sketches, Commentaries and Reflections on the Natural Order, Bendigo: Carbarita Press, 2022 (co-authored with Brian Coman).
- Sacred Heart Cathedral Bendigo, Bendigo: Carbarita Press, 2023 (co-authored with Brian Coman and Frank Marriott).

Articles (a selection only)

- Luther's Affirmation, St Mark's Review, No. 52, May 1968
- Petrarch and Dr. Leavis: A Perspective on Literature and Society, ANU Historical Journal, No 6, Nov 1969
- Traditional and Modern Attitudes to Religious Biography, Religious Traditions, VII-IX 1986
- The Religious Tradition of the Australian Aborigines, Sri Lanka Institute of Traditional Studies, 1990
- The Religious Tradition of the Australian Aborigines in A. Sharma (ed) Fragments of Infinity: Essays in Philosophy and Religion, Prism Press, 1991
- Disowning the Past: the Political and Postmodernist Assault on the Humanities, Quadrant, March 1992
- Sankara's Doctrine of Maya, Asian Philosophy 2:2, 1992
- The Life and Work of René Guénon introduction to R. Guénon's Reign of Quantity, Sophia Perennis et Universalis, 1995
- Modern Science and the Destruction of Traditional Understandings, Australian Orthodontic Journal 14:3, October 1996
- Tracking The Searchers: A survey of its critical reception, Continuum, 11:2 1997
- Delivering the last blade of grass': Aspects of the Bodhisattva Ideal in the Mahayana, Asian Philosophy, 1997 *"Metaphysics, Theology and Philosophy", Sacred Web I, 1998
- A Sage for the Times: the Role and Oeuvre of Frithjof Schuon, Sophia, 1998
- The Translucence of the Eternal': Religious Understandings of the Natural Order, Sacred Web 2, 1998
- To a Buddhist Beat: Allen Ginsberg on Poetics, Politics and Spirituality, Beyond the Divide 3, 1999
- The Role of Mystical Traditions in the Contemporary World, The Treasure: Australia's Sufi Magazine, Issue No. 8, 2000
- Formal Diversity, Inner Unity, Sacred Web, 2000
- The Not-so-Close Encounters of Western Psychology & Eastern Spirituality (The Animist, 2000)
- Melodies from the Beyond: Aboriginal Religion in Schuonian Perspective (Connaissance des religions, 2001)
- 'Signs of the Supra-Sensible': Frithjof Schuon on the Natural Order (Sacred Web, 2001)
- Seeing God Everywhere: Essays on Nature and the Sacred (Bloomington: World Wisdom, 2003)
