= Ali Lakhani =

Canadian traditionalist writer, lawyer and editor (born 1955)

M. Ali Lakhani
- Born: 1955 (age 70–71); England
- Education: Law, Cambridge University
- Occupations: Writer, lawyer
- Website: www.sacredweb.com

M. Ali Lakhani, KC (born 1955) is a traditionalist writer, lawyer, and editor whose works focus on metaphysics and the perennial principles found in the wisdom traditions of the world.

He is married to Nazlin A. Lakhani and lives in Vancouver, Canada.

== Biography ==
Born in England in 1955, Lakhani was educated at The King's School, Canterbury before receiving his undergraduate and graduate degrees in law from Cambridge University. He immigrated to Vancouver in 1973, and was called to the Bar in British Columbia in 1979. He practises law in Vancouver as a trial lawyer. In 2015, he was conferred the designation of "Queen's Counsel" by the Lieutenant-Governor of British Columbia to recognize his work as a lawyer.

In 1998, he founded the Traditionalist journal, Sacred Web: A Journal of Tradition and Modernity. The bi-annual journal has included contributions by many leading traditionalists including Titus Burckhardt, Ananda K. Coomaraswamy, Jean-Louis Michon, Seyyed Hossein Nasr, Frithjof Schuon, Huston Smith, and the Prince of Wales.

In 2001, Lakhani was invited to address the International Congress on Imam 'Ali in Iran where he presented his essay on The Metaphysics of Human Governance. This essay garnered the First Prize in English at the conference. The prize was awarded at a special ceremony in Tehran in March 2002. A revised version of Lakhani's essay is included in The Sacred Foundations of Justice in Islam. The anthology was described by Professor Seyyed Hossein Nasr, as "among the best writings on this extraordinary figure in Western languages and are obligatory reading for anyone interested in ‘Ali but not familiar with Islamic languages.

In May 2016, at the invitation of the Temenos Academy, Lakhani presented a talk at the Royal Asiatic Society in London, England, titled ‘The Integral Vision of the Aga Khan’. The talk focused on a question asked by the Aga Khan in 2006: "How, in an increasingly cynical time, can we inspire people to a new set of aspirations - reaching beyond rampant materialism, the new relativism, self-serving individualism, and resurgent tribalism?"

Lakhani's book, Faith and Ethics: The Vision of the Ismaili Imamat was published by I.B. Tauris in association with The Institute of Ismaili Studies in 2018. The book examines how the ideas and actions of the current Ismaili Imam, and fourth Aga Khan, Prince Karim al-Husseini, provide an Islamic response to the challenges that face Muslims in the modern era. The book provides an extensive survey of the Aga Khan's aspirations, showing how the values of integrity and dignity are at the forefront of his work, with the traditional Muslim concepts of cosmopolitanism and social justice guiding his response to the stark challenges of the modern age.

In 2021, The Matheson Trust published an anthology of spiritual aphorisms by Lakhani, titled When the Rose Blooms.

== Bibliography ==
- The Sacred Foundations of Justice (World Wisdom, 2006), edited anthology, where he contributed with a prize-winning essay ISBN 978-1-933316-26-0
- The Betrayal of Tradition: Essays on the Spiritual Crisis of Modernity (World Wisdom, 2005) ISBN 978-0-941532-55-6
- The Timeless Relevance of Traditional Wisdom (World Wisdom, 2010) ISBN 978-1935493198
- Faith and Ethics: The Vision of the Ismaili Imamat (I.B. Tauris, 2018) ISBN 978-1788312486
- When the Rose Blooms (The Matheson Trust, 2021)
- Compassion in Traditional and Secular Morality (Religions: A Scholarly Journal, Issue 1, 2011, published by the Doha International Center for Interfaith Dialogue)
- Aesthetic Foundations of Ecological Responsibility (Religions: A Scholarly Journal, Issue 4, 2012)
- Integral Pluralism as the Basis for Harmony: The Approach of His Highness the Aga Khan (Religions: A Scholarly Journal, Issue 9, 2016)
- ‘The Clash of Fundamentalisms’ in Clashing Fundamentalisms: When Rival Truth Claims Meet Head-On (Centre for Studies in Religion and Society, Community Seminar Volume 14, University of Victoria, Canada)
