= Rusmir Mahmutćehajić =

Bosnian academic and politician (1948–2026)

- Born: 29 June 1948; Stolac, PR Bosnia and Herzegovina, FPR Yugoslavia
- Died: 5 April 2026 (aged 77); Sarajevo, Bosnia and Herzegovina
- Education: University of Sarajevo; University of Zagreb
- Known for: Deputy Prime Minister of the Republic of Bosnia, author

Rusmir Mahmutćehajić (29 June 1948 – 5 April 2026) was a Bosnian author, intellectual and politician.

== Life and career ==
Mahmutćehajić was born in Stolac, PR Bosnia and Herzegovina on 29 June 1948. He studied electrical engineering at the University of Sarajevo and graduated in 1973. He continued his studies at the University of Zagreb with a focus on the propagation of electromagnetic waves in multiconductor systems. In 1988, he was a visiting professor at the Catholic University of Leuven for a year and became internationally known as an expert in electrical engineering.

From 1985 to 1991, he served as Professor and Dean of Electrical Engineering at the University of Osijek in Croatia.

He served as the Deputy Prime Minister of the Republic of Bosnia and Herzegovina in 1992 and Energy Minister from 1992 to 1994, during the Bosnian war. He was a close associate of Alija Izetbegović. He later parted with Izetbegović and the SDA over the Dayton Agreement.

Mahmutćehajić served as a professor of electrical engineering, mechanical engineering and Islamic theology at the University of Sarajevo since 1995. He lived in Sarajevo, where he worked as the president of International Forum Bosnia. He is the author of more than 20 works in Bosnian, several of which have been translated to English, French, Italian, and Turkish.

Mahmutćehajić died in Sarajevo on 6 April 2026, at the age of 77.

== Thought ==
Mahmutćehajić argued for a vision of Bosnia that is pluralistic and inclusive of racial, ethnic, and religious diversity.

== Works ==
Mahmutćehajić was the author of more than 20 books and hundreds of essays and articles. His publications include:

- 1977 – Krhkost
- 1996 – Suđeni Stolac
- 2000 – Bosnia the Good: Tolerance and Tradition
- 2000 – The Denial of Bosnia
- 2003 – Sarajevo Essays: Politics, Ideology, and Tradition
- 2005 – Learning from Bosnia: Approaching Tradition
- 2006 – The Mosque: the Heart of Submission
- 2007 – On Love: In the Muslim Tradition
- 2011 – On the Other: A Muslim View
- 2011 – Across the River: On the Poetry of Mak Dizdar
- 2011 – Maintaining the Sacred Center: the Bosnian City of Stolac
- 2015 – The Praised and the Virgin
