= Reza Shah-Kazemi =

Islamic author

- Born: 1 June 1960; London, United Kingdom
- Citizenship: British
- Occupations: Senior Research Associate at the Institute of Ismaili Studies, London

Education
- Education: Sussex University; Exeter University; University of Kent

Philosophical work
- Main interests: Comparative Mysticism, Sufism, Quranic studies, Early Shi'ism
- Notable works: • Paths to Transcendence: According to Shankara, Ibn Arabi and Meister Eckhart; • The Other in the Light of the One: The Universality of the Qur'an and Interfaith Dialogue; • Justice and Remembrance: Introducing the Spirituality of Imam Ali; • Common Ground between Islam and Buddhism

Reza Shah-Kazemi (born 1 June 1960) is a British author who specializes in comparative mysticism, Islamic Studies, Sufism and Shi'ism. He is the founding editor of the Islamic World Report and currently a research associate at the Institute of Ismaili Studies in London.

== Biography ==
Reza Shah-Kazemi was born in London on 1 June 1960 to a Pakistani father and an Iranian mother. He obtained a First Class Honours in International Relations for his BA degree from Sussex University (1979-1984). Subsequently, he earned an MA in Politics with Distinction at Exeter University (1984-1985), which was followed by a PhD in Comparative Religion at University of Kent (1989-1994).

In 1994, he co-launched the Islamic World Report, which has since evolved into a publishing company. Between 1997 and 1999, he served as a consultant to the Institute for Policy Research (IKD) in Kuala Lumpur, Malaysia. Presently, he holds the role of Senior Research Associate at the Institute of Ismaili Studies in London, where he serves as managing editor of the Encyclopaedia Islamica, the English translation and edition of the Persian Great Islamic Encyclopedia (دائرةالمعارف بزرگ اسلامی / Da'irat al-Ma'arif-i Buzurg-i Islami).

He was one of the 138 signatories of the Open Letter titled "A Common Word Between Us and You", addressed to "Leaders of Christian Churches everywhere" on October 13, 2007. In 2009, he was included in the list of The 500 Most Influential Muslims by Georgetown University and the Royal Islamic Strategic Studies Centre of Jordan. He has been a contributor to the BBC Radio 2 program "Pause for Thought."

== Awards/prizes ==
- Book of the Year on Walaya (Kitab-i Sal-i Vilayat), Iran, awarded for Justice and Remembrance: Introducing the Spirituality of Imam Ali, November 2007.
- International Book Award (Jayazeh-yi Jahani), Iran, awarded for Justice and Remembrance: Introducing the Spirituality of Imam Ali, February 2008.

== Works ==
As author

- Seeing God Everywhere: Qur’anic Perspectives on the Sanctity of Virgin Nature (Cambridge, U.K.: The Muslim Academic Trust, 2021) ISBN 9781902350141
- Imam 'Ali: From Concise History to Timeless Mystery (London, U.K.: The Matheson Trust, 2019) ISBN 9781908092182
- The Spirit Of Tolerance in Islam (London, U.K.: Bloomsbury Publishing, 2012) ISBN 9780857735270
- Spiritual Quest: Reflections on Qur’anic Prayer According to the Teachings of Imam Ali (London, U.K.: I.B. Tauris/Institute of Ismaili Studies, 2011) ISBN 9780857735287
- Common Ground Between Islam and Buddhism (Louisville, Kentucky, U.S.A.: Fons Vitae, 2010) ISBN 9781891785627. Foreword by the Fourteenth Dalai Lama. Translated into French, Arabic, Persian, Urdu, Malay.
- The Holy Qur’an and the Environment, co-authored with Ghazi bin Muhammad and Aftab Ahmad) (Amman, Jordan: Royal Aal al-Bayt Institute for Islamic Thought, 2010)
- My Mercy Encompasses All: The Koran's Teachings on Compassion, Peace and Love (Emeryville, California, U.S.A.: Shoemaker & Hoard, 2007) ISBN 978-1-59376-144-8. Translated into French.
- Justice and Remembrance: Introducing the Spirituality of Imam Ali (London, U.K.: I.B. Tauris/Institute of Ismaili Studies, 2007) ISBN 978-1-84511-526-5. Translated into Arabic, Persian and Portuguese.
- Paths to Transcendence - According to Shankara, Ibn Arabi and Meister Eckhart (Bloomington, Indiana, U.S.A.: World Wisdom, 2006) ISBN 978-0-941532-97-6. Translated into French.
- The Other in the Light of the One: The Universality of the Qur'an and Interfaith Dialogue (Cambridge, U.K.: Islamic Texts Society, 2006) ISBN 978-1-903682-47-0
- Avicenna, Prince of Physicians (London, U.K.: Hood Hood Books, 1997) ISBN 978-1-900251-23-5
- Crisis In Chechnia: Russian Imperialism, Chechen Nationalism and Militant Sufism (London, U.K.: Islamic World Report, 1995) ISBN 978-1-901230-00-0

As translator

- Doctrines of Shi’i Islam: A Compendium of Imami Beliefs and Practices by Ayatollah Ja`far Sobhani. Annotated translation from the Persian (London, U.K.: I. B. Tauris/Institute of Ismaili Studies, 2001) ISBN 978-1-86064-780-2

As editor

- Encyclopaedia Islamica, vols. 1−7 (2008−2017); vol. 8 (forthcoming); vol. 9 (2024); vols. 10−16 (forthcoming). Managing Editor: R. Shah-Kazemi; Editors-in-chief: W. Madelung, F. Daftary (Leiden, Netherlands: Brill, and London, U.K.: Institute of Ismaili Studies).
- Algeria: Revolution Revisited (London, U.K.: Islamic World Report, 1997) ISBN 978-1-86064-368-2
- Turkey: The Pendulum Swings Back (London, U.K.: Islamic World Report, 1996) ISBN 978-1-901230-02-4
- Bosnia: Destruction of a Nation, Inversion of a Principle (London, U.K.: Islamic World Report, 1996) ISBN 978-1-901230-01-7
