= Jean Borella =

French Christian philosopher and theologian (1930–2026)

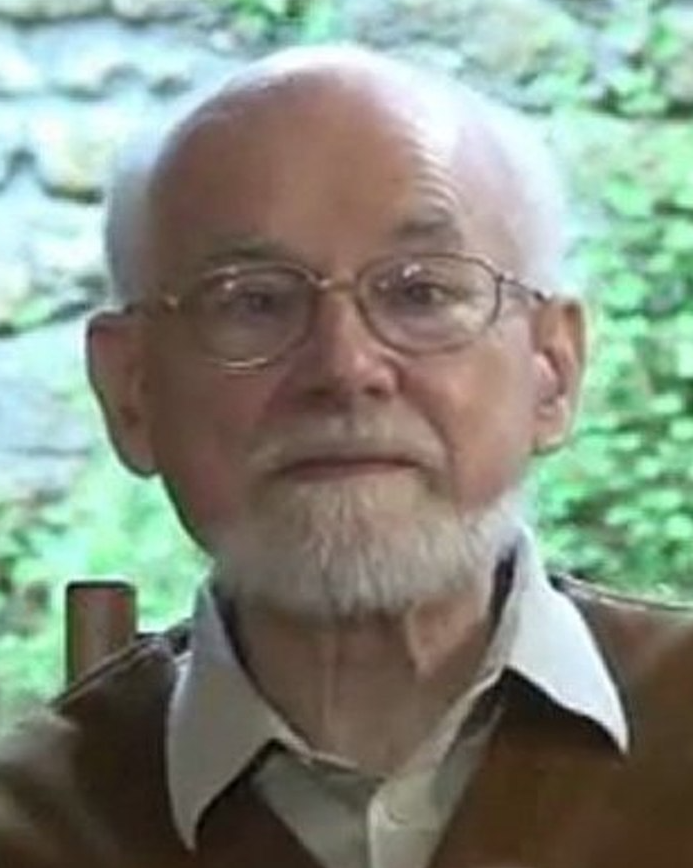
Jean Borella

Jean Borella (21 May 1930 – 11 October 2026) was a French Christian philosopher and theologian. His works were inspired by Ancient and Christian Neoplatonism, but also by the Traditionalist School of René Guénon and Frithjof Schuon.

== Life and career ==
Borella was born in Nancy, France on 21 May 1930. His father, who was Italian, made a career in military aviation before his death in 1937 in an air crash, when Jean was seven years old. Borella's mother was French from Lorraine. Borella had a Catholic education and traditional public school secondary studies which reinforced in him the idea that he would be a defender of the faith. By age 14, Borella understood Cartesian proof of the existence of God. In 1950, he stayed for a short while in a Benedictine monastery, but left, disappointed.

He attended university in Nancy, France. Two of Borella's philosophy professors had significant influence on him, Georges Vallin and Guy Bugault. Vallin, French orientalist and philosopher, primarily taught the principles of Vedanta, while Bugault taught Hindu and Buddhist philosophy. Borella graduated in 1953 with a degree in philosophy, and, in the same year, became familiar with the work of René Guénon, and later with the work of Frithjof Schuon.

In 1954, Borella married a Polish woman. By 1957, he was a professor of philosophy in Gérardmer. From 1962 to 1977, he taught philosophy and literature in preparatory classes in Nancy, and from 1977 until his retirement in 1995, metaphysics and medieval philosophy at the University of Nancy II. In 1982, he defended his doctoral thesis at the Paris Nanterre University, entitled Metaphysical Foundations of Sacred Symbolism: Philosophical Prolegomena, under the supervision of Paul Ricœur.

Borella died on 11 October 2026, at the age of 96.

== Bibliography ==
(in French)

- Bérard, Bruno, and Jean Borella. Jean Borella, la révolution métaphysique: après Galilée, Kant, Marx, Freud, Derrida. Religions et spiritualité. Paris: Harmattan, 2006. ISBN 2-296-00727-9
- Esotérisme guénonien et mystère chrétien, L’Age d’Homme, Lausanne, 1997.
- Histoire et théorie du symbole, L’Age d’Homme, Lausanne, 2004 (édition revue et corrigée du "Mystère du signe", Maisonneuve et Larose, 1989).
- La charité profanée, Editions Dominique Martin Morin.
- La crise du symbolisme religieux, L’Age d’Homme, Lausanne, 1990.
- Le poème de la Création. Traduction de la Genèse 1-3, Ad Solem, 2002.
- Le sens du surnaturel, Ad Solem, Genève 1996.
- Lumières de la théologie mystique, L'Age d'Homme, Lausanne, 2002.
- Penser l’analogie, Ad Solem, Genève 2000.
- Symbolisme et réalité, Ad Solem, 1997.

(in English)

- The sense of the supernatural
- Guénonian Esoterism and Christian Mystery
- The Secret of the Christian Way: A Contemplative Ascent Through the Writings of Jean Borella, Borella, Jean, and G. John Champoux.. SUNY series in Western esoteric traditions. Albany: State University of New York Press, 2001. ISBN 0-7914-4843-6
- The Torn Veil
- Love and Truth: The Christian Path of Charity (trans: La charité profanée)
- The Crisis of Religious Symbolism & Symbolism and Reality (trans: La crise du symbolisme religieux & Symbolisme et réalité)
