= Traditionalism (perennialism) =

Perennial philosophy

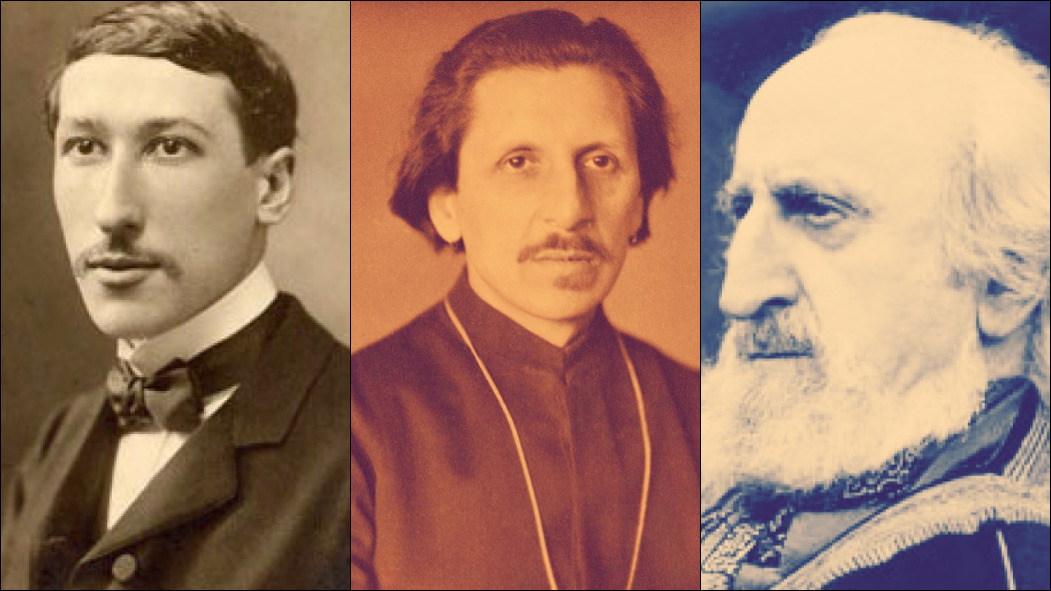
René Guénon, Ananda Coomaraswamy and Frithjof Schuon

Traditionalism, also known as the Traditionalist School, is a school of thought within perennial philosophy. Originating in the thought of René Guénon in the 20th century, it proposes that a single primordial, metaphysical truth forms the source for, and is shared by, all the major world religions. Unlike universalist forms of perennialism based on commonalities in religious experiences across cultures, Traditionalism posits a metaphysical unitary source known as Tradition which forms the basis for the major religions in their "orthodox" forms.

Tradition has exoteric and esoteric dimensions. The exoteric aspects of a tradition are primarily represented by its ceremonies, rituals, and rules, whereas the esoteric aspects are concerned with its spiritual and intellectual qualities. Traditionalists often contrast "tradition" to "modernity". While "tradition" has a transcendent origin, "modernity" takes little or no account of this dimension. Traditionalists defend the transcendent dimension of reality that they see as inherent in traditional religious expressions and worldviews. In contrast, they view liberal and modernist expressions of these traditions with suspicion, seeing their foundations as rationalistic, materialistic and individualistic.

The boundary between the terms "Traditionalism" and "Perennialism" is imprecise and disputed, though they broadly represent distinct, but related, streams of thought. While some Traditionalists equate their philosophy with perennialism writ large and use the terms synonymously or interchangeably, not all perennialists consider themselves Traditionalists. Despite being seen as the founder of Traditionalism, Guénon rejected the label and referred to himself only as a perennialist. Aldous Huxley, who popularized the term "perennial philosophy" in his 1945 book, had a mystical universalist perspective distinct from that of the Traditionalist School.

Historian Mark Sedgwick identifies René Guénon, Ananda Coomaraswamy, Frithjof Schuon, Seyyed Hossein Nasr, Julius Evola, Mircea Eliade, and Alexandr Dugin to be the seven most prominent Traditionalists. While Sedgwick identifies a politically quietist strand of Traditionalism rooted in the perspective of Guénon, Traditionalism has been applied in various socio-political contexts. These range from the environmentalism of Nasr, to the interfaith dialogue projects of Prince Ghazi bin Muhammad and Royal Aal al-Bayt Institute for Islamic Thought, to the patronage of traditional arts, crafts, architecture and philosophy by King Charles III, to the far-right politics of Evola, Eliade and Dugin. While some far-right movements and thinkers cite Traditionalism (especially Evola) as an influence and draw on its language in their discourse, scholars dispute whether, or to what extent, these views can actually be reconciled to Traditionalist thought.

== Background ==
=== Etymology ===
The word "tradition" is derived from the Latin term traditio, which means "to hand over." Etymologically, the term tradition refers to the transmission of knowledge, practice, skills, laws, forms, and a variety of other oral and written aspects. For Seyyed Hossein Nasr, tradition is analogous to a "living presence" that leaves its imprint but is irreducible to that imprint. There are at least two levels of meaning here. First, tradition is defined as the passing down of knowledge from one generation to the next, which is reflected in the word's Latin etymology. Nasr considers the Arabic din and Sanskrit dharma to be roughly similar in meaning 'tradition,' while he recognizes that they do not correspond with the Latin root, which indicates the concept of transmission. Second, tradition entails some kind of "living force", and the mark it leaves behind, with the force "ontologically transcending the mark". This resembles a Platonic form whose appearance in the universe is only a shadow of its "true reality", but Nasr has spoken of something "living" and "present", which is a recurring theme in his works.

=== Perennialism ===
According to representatives of the Traditionalist School, all major world religions are founded upon common primordial and universal metaphysical truths. The perspective of its authors is often referred to as philosophia perennis (perennial philosophy), which is both "absolute Truth and infinite Presence". Absolute Truth is "the perennial wisdom (sophia perennis) that stands as the transcendent source of all the intrinsically orthodox religions of humankind". Infinite Presence is "the perennial religion (religio perennis) that lives within the heart of all intrinsically orthodox religions." According to Frithjof Schuon,

The term philosophia perennis, which has been current since the time of the Renaissance and of which neo-scholasticism made much use, signifies the totality of the primordial and universal truths — and therefore of the metaphysical axioms — whose formulation does not belong to any particular system. One could speak in the same sense of a religio perennis, designating by this term the essence of every religion; this means the essence of every form of worship, every form of prayer, and every system of morality, just as the sophia perennis is the essence of all dogmas and all expressions of wisdom. We prefer the term sophia to that of philosophia, for the simple reason that the second term is less direct and because it evokes in addition associations of ideas with a completely profane and all too often aberrant system of thought.

The Traditionalist vision of a perennial wisdom is not based on mystical experiences, but on metaphysical intuitions. It is "intuited directly through divine intellect". This divine intellect is different from reason, and makes it possible to discern "the sacred unity of reality that is attested in all authentic esoteric expressions of tradition"; it is "the presence of divinity within each human waiting to be uncovered". According to Schuon:

The key to the eternal sophia is pure intellection or in other words metaphysical discernment. To "discern" is to "separate": to separate the Real and the illusory, the Absolute and the contingent, the Necessary and the possible, Atma and Maya. Accompanying discernment, by way of complement and operatively, is concentration, which unites: this means becoming fully aware — from the starting point of earthly and human Maya — of Atma, which is both absolute and infinite.

For the Traditionalists, perennial philosophy has a transcendent dimension – Truth or Wisdom – and an immanent dimension – infinite Presence or Union. Thus, on the one hand, "discernment between the Real and the unreal, or the Absolute and the relative", and on the other hand, "mystical concentration on the Real".

=== Concept of Tradition ===
According to Beverly J. Lanzetta, "tradition forms the backbone" of the perennial philosophy. The term "tradition" as used by Nasr and other "traditionists" such as René Guénon, Frithjof Schuon, Titus Burckhardt, and Martin Lings, does not refer to custom, habit, or inherited patterns of life and thought. For them, tradition "is of sacred and divine origin", and it encompasses the continuation and transmission of the sacred message through time. Used in this context, "tradition" refers to revelation and all forms of philosophy, art, and culture that are shaped by it, spreading the reverberations of revelation on earth and thereby reminding humans of the "Divine Center" and "Ultimate Origin".

For Nasr, "tradition":

… means truths or principles of a divine origin revealed or unveiled to mankind and, in fact, a whole cosmic sector through various figures envisaged as messengers, prophets, avataras, the Logos or other transmitting agencies, along with all the ramifications and applications of these principles in different realms including law and social structure, art, symbolism, the sciences, and embracing of course Supreme Knowledge along with the means for its attainment.

— Seyyed Hossein Nasr quoted in Sallie B. King, The Philosophia Perennis and the Religions of the World, 2000

Tradition, according to Nasr, is pure and divine, and it represents God's will. Similarly, tradition, as a sacred concept with its origin in God, is the only way to communicate with God, who fully encompasses the universe and is constantly present "in the very depth of all human beings". As a result, tradition is perfectly in harmony with the prophetic revelations, which represent the "highest order of reality", capable of elevating man to "higher altitudes of personality".

=== Tradition and modernity ===
Nasr and other "traditionists" refer to "tradition" as a reality that is as old as man himself. He believes that the contemporary usage of the term and references to the concept of tradition are, in some ways, an aberration necessitated by the anomaly that is the modern world as a whole. The purpose of using the term is therefore to raise consciousness of the underlying differences between reality represented by this specific sense of the term "tradition" and everything that lacks a divine origin but arises from the merely human and, at times, the subhuman.

If "traditional" refers to something that is still connected to its transcendent origin and can be traced back to it, "modern" refers to that which is detached from the Transcendent, from the immutable principles that govern everything in reality. Modernism and modernity are thus the polar opposites of tradition, implying everything that is essentially human and, progressively, subhuman, as well as everything that is detached and disconnected from the Divine Source. According to Schuon, their main characteristics are rationalism, which denies the possibility of a supra-rational knowledge, materialism, according to which only matter gives meaning to life, psychologism, which reduces the spiritual and the intellectual to the psychic, skepticism, relativism, existentialism, individualism, progressivism, evolutionism, scientism and empiricism, without forgetting agnosticism and atheism.

=== Exoteric and esoteric dimensions ===
For Traditionalists, Tradition has two fundamental aspects, namely, exoteric and esoteric. The exoteric aspect is predominantly manifested in its rites, rituals, and laws. It also comprises the theologies or doctrines that give a tradition its uniqueness and particularity. The esoteric or the inward dimension of tradition, on the other hand, encompasses "not only its spiritual substance, but also its intellectual qualities". Islam, for example, divides its exoteric and esoteric aspects into the Sharia and the Tariqa, respectively. The Kabbalah is considered esoteric in Judaism as opposed to the exoteric understanding of the Talmud. The esoteric aspect of tradition is considered its essence and its core. This aspect, it is claimed, is only accessible "to those who are able to appreciate the inward dimension of tradition." Traditionalists insist on the necessity for affiliation to one of the great religions of the world, without which no esoteric path is possible. (Note: See Titus Burckhardt, "A Letter on Spiritual Method" in Mirror of the Intellect, Cambridge (UK), Quinta Essentia, 1987 (ISBN 0-946621-08-X))

Together with various traditions and religions, Traditionalists also believe in the reality of a Primordial Tradition, which is said to encapsulate "all truths of all religions". For Guénon, the Primordial Tradition represents "the unity of thought and action which, transcending the arbitrary rule of culture and society, serves as the one common denominator between men and leads them to an awareness of Unity, supreme and indivisible". For Nasr, this Primordial Tradition "flows from an Absolute Truth that has been expressed in diverse ways through the ages". Nasr holds that the existence of different religions is not evidence against the Primordial Tradition. The assumption that all religions hold a fundamental truth, contrarily, is supported by such variation when one approaches religions from an esoteric viewpoint. According to Nasr:

All traditions… are earthly manifestations of celestial archetypes of the Primordial Tradition in the same way that all revelations are related to the Logos or the Word which was at the beginning and which is at once an aspect of the Universal Logos and the Universal Logos as such.

— Seyyed Hossein Nasr quoted in Adnan Aslan, Religious Pluralism in Christian and Islamic Philosophy: The Thought of John Hick and Seyyed Hossein Nasr, 1998

For Nasr, "each tradition is based on a direct message from Heaven and cannot be seen simply as the historical continuation of the Primordial Tradition". Its acceptance does not imply that any of the revealed religions are devoid of divine origin. Rather, it is to affirm the "presence" that is inextricably linked to the sacred. The Primordial Tradition is thus viewed as "a block of principles which were often revitalised through revelation". For him, all religions are united not just by a common source but also by a common substance, the Primordial Tradition.

== People ==
The ideas of Traditionalism are considered to begin with René Guénon. Other representatives of this school of thought include Ananda Coomaraswamy, Frithjof Schuon, Titus Burckhardt, Martin Lings, Hossein Nasr, William Stoddart, Jean-Louis Michon, Marco Pallis, Lord Northbourne, Huston Smith, Awadh Kishore Saran, Harry Oldmeadow, Reza Shah-Kazemi and Patrick Laude. Some academics include Julius Evola in this school, although Evola presents many differences in relation to those mentioned. Another author linked to perennialism is Mircea Eliade, although Eliade's link is nuanced and often contested.

=== René Guénon ===
A major theme in the works of René Guénon (1886–1951) is the contrast between traditional world views and modernism, "which he considered to be an anomaly in the history of mankind". For Guénon, the world is a manifestation of metaphysical principles, which are preserved in the perennial teachings of the world religions, but were lost to the modern mentality. For Guénon, "the malaise of the modern world lies in its relentless denial of the metaphysical realm". (Note: According to Wouter Hanegraaf, "modernity itself is in fact intertwined with the history of esotericism". Western esotericism had a profound influence on Hindu and Buddhist modernisers, whose modernisations in turn had a deep impact on modern western spirituality. See: Michelis, Elizabeth De (2005). A History of Modern Yoga: Patanjali and Western Esotericism. A&C Black. ISBN 978-0-8264-8772-8.)

Early on, Guénon was attracted to Sufism, and in 1912 he was initiated in the Shadhili order. He left academia in 1923, after his doctoral thesis was rejected. His works center on the return to traditional world views, trying to reconstruct the Perennial Philosophy. (Note: Oxford University Press, Description: "Against the Modern World. Traditionalism and the Secret Intellectual History of the Twentieth Century")

In his first books and essays, he envisaged a restoration of traditional "intellectualité" in the West on the basis of Roman Catholicism and Freemasonry. (Note: Cf. among others his Aperçus sur l'ésotérisme chrétien (Éditions Traditionnelles, Paris, 1954) and Études sur la Franc-maçonnerie et le Compagnonnage (2 vols, Éditions Traditionnelles, Paris, 1964–65) which include many of his articles for the Catholic journal Regnabit.) He gave up early the idea of a Traditionalist restoration of the West on a purely Christian basis. He denounced the lure of Theosophy and neo-occultism in the form of Spiritism, (Note: Cf. his Le Théosophisme, histoire d'une pseudo-religion, Paris, Nouvelle Librairie Nationale, 1921, and L'Erreur spirite, Paris, Marcel Rivière, 1923. Both books exist in English translation.) two influential movements that were flourishing in his lifetime. In 1930, he moved to Egypt, where he lived until his death in 1951.

=== Ananda Coomaraswamy ===
According to William W. Quinn, Coomaraswamy's idea of Tradition is similar to Guénon's Primordial Tradition. Coomaraswamy saw no difference between the concepts of Tradition and philosophia perennis. For Coomaraswamy, their application differed, with philosophia perennis being used to represent a collection of interconnected metaphysical principles that could be explained either without reference to any particular Traditional culture or with reference to all of them, while the term Tradition was almost always used in relation to a specific culture.

=== Frithjof Schuon ===
Frithjof Schuon understood tradition "as being the semidivine and semihuman reality that provides mankind with a general climate conducive to the consciousness of the Absolute". The word tradition appears in Schuon's writings frequently, usually in close proximity to the word religion. Following in Guenon's footsteps, Schuon theorized the causes of the historical origins of a wide spectrum of religious traditions. For him, religions differ because human societies and cultures differ, and God's revealed truth adapts to the specificity of each society. Nevertheless, these religions emanate from the same divine source. Schuon referred to this principle as the "transcendent unity of religions," and his aim was to provide a unifying explanation of religious variety while still acknowledging and appreciating the differences.

=== Seyyed Hossein Nasr ===
According to Howard, Tradition has been amply defined by Seyyed Hossein Nasr, whose writings provide a comprehensive framework. Nasr credits Guénon from whom he derives his idea of Tradition. For Nasr, Tradition comes from the divine source and, in a traditional society, it affects all aspects of life. This divine source "is both the content and the means of revelation", which is "effected" by various "transmitting agencies". The revelation's guiding principles gave rise to a number of subsidiary sciences and arts, which were creatively enlarged to incorporate different elements of social, political, and cultural life. For Nasr, tradition is a repository of "Supreme Knowledge", which is another name for the philosophia perennis, and it provides "the means" for attaining supreme knowledge.

== Influence ==
In explaining the varied applications of Traditionalism - in religion, philosophy, metaphysics, etc. -, Sedgwick writes that Traditionalism has "been used to encourage respect for the environment, compose great music, and reduce hostility between followers of different religions. It has also been used to support very different causes, from the [first] election of Donald Trump as President of the United States of America, to what many would call fascism and racism, not to mention terrorism."

Sedgwick writes that "some Traditionalists read both Evola and Guénon and focus on politics, while some read both Schuon and Guénon, or just Guénon, and focus on religion and self-realization."

=== In the Muslim world ===
Through its close affiliation with Sufism, the Guénonian Traditionalist perspective has had an influence in Asia and the Islamic world at large. (Note: Witness the works by Mahmoud Bina at the Isfahan University of Technology, the Malay scholar Osman Bakar, and the Ceylonese Ranjit Fernando. This is probably also related to the expansion of the Maryamiyya branch of the Shadhili Sufi order, as studied by Sedgwick, Against the Modern World, always within the pale of Sunni Islam. Cf. also a review by Carl W. Ernst: "Traditionalism, the Perennial Philosophy, and Islamic Studies", Middle East Studies Association Bulletin, vol. 28, no. 2)

==== Iran ====
In Iran, it was introduced by Hossein Nasr as well as, earlier, by Ali Shariati, the intellectual considered the ideologue of the Iranian Revolution who recommended Guénon to his students. While it never acquired a mass following, its influence on the elite can be measured by the fact that when Ayatollah Khomeini organized the Supreme Council of the Cultural Revolution, out of the seven members designed to serve it, three were acquainted with Traditionalist ideas, namely Abdolkarim Soroush, Reza Davari Ardakani, and Nasrullah Pourjavady.

==== Pakistan ====
Hasan Askari, an important Pakistani writer and literary critic, was directly influenced by Guénon, and, through him, Muhammad Shafi and his son Taqi Usmani, some of the country's most influential Islamic scholars, integrated Guénon's works in the curriculum of the Darul Uloom Karachi, one of the most important madrassa or religious seminaries in the country. Other important figures of Pakistan influenced by Traditionalism include A. K. Brohi, who was seen as close to General Zia-ul-Haq, and psychologist Muhammad Ajmal.

==== Morocco ====
The Budshishiyya order of Sufism, based in Morocco, is known to have strands influenced by Traditionalism.

=== Far-right and right-wing populist movements ===
Sedgwick notes that in the 21st century, some "post-Traditionalists" - notably Aleksandr Dugin - have drawn rhetorically on the "pair of traditional and modern" to advance the political agenda of the "radical right," while rejecting or downplaying perennialism. Dugin, an influential Russian far-right thinker, has been influenced by Guénon and Evola.

Julius Evola was an Italian Traditionalist influenced by Guénon but from whom he departed on many points, which did not allow him to be assimilated to Guénonian Traditionalism. (Note: Renaud Fabbri argues that Evola should not be considered a member of the Perennialist School. See the section Julius Evola and the Perennialist School in Fabbri's Introduction to the Perennialist School.) The ideas of Evola have been associated with some far-right movements, such as the European Nouvelle Droite ("New Right"), and Italian neo-fascists during the Years of Lead. (Note: Paul Furlong argues that 'Evola's initial writings in the inter-war period were from an ideological position close to the Fascist regime in Italy, though not identical to it.' Over his active years, Furlong writes, he 'synthesized' spiritual bearings of writers like Guénon with his political concerns of the 'European authoritarian Right'. Evola tried to develop a tradition different from that of Guénon and thus attempted to develop a 'strategy of active revolt as a counterpart to the spiritual withdrawal favoured by Guénon.' Evola, as Farlong puts it, wanted to have political influence both in the Fascist and Nazi regimes, something which he failed to achieve. See Furlong, Paul: Authoritarian Conservatism After The War Julius Evola and Europe, 2003.)

Similarly, the Romanian Traditionalist Mircea Eliade had been a supporter of the Romanian Orthodox fascist Iron Guard.

According to Benjamin Teitelbaum, Savitri Devi, the founder of Esoteric Hitlerism, was influenced by both Guénon and Evola, so was Donald Trump's former adviser Steve Bannon, Dugin, the Brazilian writer Olavo de Carvalho, and Tibor Baranyi, a one time adviser to the Hungarian Jobbik conservative political party. According to Teitelbaum, they have all interacted with each other based on those interests. Carvalho denies this association.

Mark Sedgwick's Against the Modern World, published in 2004, gives an analysis of political traditionalism:

A number of disenchanted intellectuals responded to Guénon's call [to form an intellectual elite] with attempts to put theory into practice. Some attempted without success to guide Fascism and Nazism along Traditionalist lines; others later participated in political terror in Italy. Traditionalism finally provided the ideological cement for the alliance of anti-democratic forces in post-Soviet Russia, and at the end of the 20th century began to enter the debate in the Islamic world about the desirable relationship between Islam and modernity.

=== Environmentalism ===
Starting in 1966, Seyyed Hossein Nasr began to apply Traditionalist ideas to environmentalism. He was one of the first philosophers to turn to this question and he is considered to be the founder of environmentalism in the Muslim world. In several works he deals with the causes of the destruction of the planet and the restorative remedies. Nasr summarizes his position thus:

That the harmony between man and nature has been destroyed is a fact which most people admit. But not everyone realizes that this disequilibrium is due to the destruction of the harmony between man and God.

Tarik Quadir argues that "the ecological crisis, for Nasr, is only an externalization of an inner malaise [...] due in large part to the various applications of modern [western] science. [...] Following the loss of the vision of the universe proper to medieval Christian worldview, [...] this science ignores or denies the existence of any reality other than that of the material aspect of nature". It is "to modernism and its false presumptions about the nature of man and the world", that Nasr attributes "the destruction of the natural environment", in addition to "the disintegration of the social fabric", and he deplores that all States, "from monarchies to communist governments, to revolutionary regimes, […] all want to copy avidly Western science and technology, without thought of their cultural, social and environmental consequences".

Nasr believes that scientism is a major cause of ecological problems. He defines scientism as the conviction that "modern science provides if not the only, at least the most reliable means to true knowledge" and that it leads thereby "to human progress", as imagined by those who evaluate a human society solely in terms of its economic growth. Nasr corroborates the observation that the development of the current economic system rests largely on human passions, which it feeds in its turn, thus generating a continuous blossoming of new needs which, in reality, are only desires. Finally, "if modern man destroys nature with such impunity, it is because he looks upon it as a mere economic resource".

Quadir maintains that for Nasr, it is not by technology that environmental problems can be solved in the long term, being themselves the consequence of this technology. According to Nasr, the critique of the extraordinary technological development is certainly necessary, but the real critique must start with the root of the problem, i.e. with oneself, because in a desacralized West, few are aware of what Nasr considers the raison d'être of human life and of nature. This consciousness, for Nasr, is present in the wisdom of the various religious traditions, "as well as in their cosmologies and sacred sciences". And it alone makes it possible to rediscover "the sense of the sacred", in particular with regard to nature, because deprived of this sense, the human being remains immersed in the ephemeral, abandoning himself to his own lower nature, with an illusory feeling of freedom.

=== Interfaith dialogue ===
Nasr was the first Traditionalist to apply the thoughts of the Traditionalist School to interfaith dialogue, based on Frithjof Schuon's idea of the "transcendent unity of religions." This perspective states that all religions have the same transcendent metaphysical source, best expressed in their esoteric and mystical traditions, which converge greatly with one another. While the exoteric dimension of religions present many differences in terms of doctrine and practice, Schuon argues that this is providential, each religion meeting the needs of a given society and culture, and that these different revelations ultimately emanate from the same divine source. Sedgwick writes that Nasr "[pointed] out that this solved the problem of disagreements between exoteric religions while leaving those religions intact, which the more popular approach of ignoring disagreements did not." Nasr also believed Traditionalism helped Muslims to understand that when conversing with Western Christians, they were "in dialogue with modernity at least as much as they were in dialogue with Christianity."

According to Sedgwick, "Traditionalism's interfaith dialogue projects have been especially important because they have been seen as Islamic initiatives in a field that has generally been dominated by Christian institutions." The Traditionalist approach to Islam has been especially well-received by Muslim-majority countries seeking better relations with the West, and by Western leaders who see it as a moderating influence in Islam. Muslim leaders in Bosnia and Jordan have applied these ideas to dialogue with other traditions in the context of sectarian conflict in their own societies, with the Jordanian approach having a "worldwide impact" and receiving the support of the country's government.

In Bosnia, Rusmir Mahmutćehajić attempted to apply Nasr's ideas to promote peace between Muslim Bosnians and Eastern Orthodox Christian Serbs in the aftermath of the Bosnian War, "blaming the conflict on modernity and seeking a return to traditional tolerance based on an appreciation of transcendent unity." Sedgwick described Mahmutćehajić's success as "limited," based on his analysis that traditional religious tolerance in the region had been rooted more in the Ottoman political situation than in cultural values analogous to transcendent unity.

In Jordan, Prince Ghazi bin Muhammad and the Jordanian state have supported the Royal Aal al-Bayt Institute for Islamic Thought, which has applied Nasr's ideas to interfaith dialogue in a number of international projects. Prince Ghazi drew on Nasr's ideas in a 2007 open letter to Pope Benedict XVI and other Christian leaders called "A Common Word Between Us and You." This project found success in Jordan and other Muslim-majority countries, especially those interested in more positive relations with the West, and was signed or endorsed by hundreds of Christian, Muslim, and Jewish leaders around the world. Notably, it received positive responses from Pope Benedict XVI, Archbishop of Canterbury Rowan Williams, U.K. Chief Rabbi Jonathan Sacks, and former U.K. Prime Minister Tony Blair.

Another dialogue project of the Royal Aal al-Bayt Institute called the Common Ground Project was organized by Prince Ghazi and the 14th Dalai Lama and led by Reza Shah-Kazemi. It applied Traditionalist ideas, especially the transcendent unity of religions, to dialogue between Islam and Buddhism. These were compiled into a book entitled Common Ground Between Islam & Buddhism, which the Institute has made freely accessible in its entirety online.

=== King Charles III ===
According to Mark Sedgwick, King Charles III, then Prince of Wales, was "more of an anti-modernist than a Traditionalist, though [...] Traditionalist influences [were] increasingly visible in some of his speeches". His 2010 book, Harmony: A New Way of Looking at Our World shows the influence of Traditionalist thought applied to subjects such as environmentalism, organic farming, sacred art and architecture. The Temenos Academy, which has Charles as a patron, is associated with Traditionalism and perennialism. The Matheson Trust, an educational charity promoting interfaith dialogue and the study of comparative religion founded by Schuon's translator Donald Macleod Matheson, has published Charles' contributions to the Traditionalist journal Sacred Web. These include an article on "Building Bridges Between Islam and the West," and the transcript of a speech he gave introducing a Traditionalist academic conference in Canada.

== See also ==
- Scientia sacra
- Resacralization of knowledge
- Urreligion

== Sources ==
Primary

- Coomaraswamy (1977), Lipsey, Roger (ed.), Coomaraswamy Selected Papers 2: Metaphysics, Princeton University Press
- Guénon, René (2001), Perspectives on Initiation, New York: Sophia Perennis
- Nasr, S.H. (2005). "Introducing the Writings of Frithjof Schuon". The Essential Frithjof Schuon. G - Reference, Information and Interdisciplinary Subjects Series. World Wisdom. ISBN 978-0-941532-92-1.
- Nasr, S.H. (1989). Knowledge and the Sacred (The Gifford Lectures). State University of New York Press. ISBN 978-0-7914-0177-4.
- Nasr, S. H. (2006). "Religious Art, Traditional Art, Sacred Art". In Nasr, Seyyed Hossein; O'Brien, Katherine (eds.). The Essential Sophia. Word Wisdom. ISBN 978-1933316109.
- Schuon, Frithjof (1982), From the Divine to the Human, Bloomington, IN: World Wisdom
- Schuon, Frithjof (2009), Logic and Transcendence, Bloomington, IN: World Wisdom, ISBN 978-193331673-4

Secondary

- Accart, Xavier (2005), René Guénon ou Le renversement des clartés, Paris, Milano: Arché, ISBN 978-2-912770-03-5
- Aslan, Adnan (1998). "Religion and Tradition". Religious Pluralism in Christian and Islamic Philosophy: The Thought of John Hick and Seyyed Hossein Nasr. Routledge. ISBN 978-0700710256.
- Aymard, J.B.; Laude, P. (2004). "Esoterism and Tradition". Frithjof Schuon: Life and Teachings. SUNY series in Western Esoteric Traditions. State University of New York Press. ISBN 978-0-7914-6205-8.
- Boujaoude, Saouma (2018). "Evolution Education in the Arab States: Context, History, Stakeholders' Positions and Future Prospects". In Hasan Deniz & Lisa A. Borgerding (ed.). Evolution Education Around the Globe. New York: Springer. ISBN 978-3-319-90939-4.
- Davies, Peter; Lynch, Derek (2004), The Routledge Companion to Fascism and the Far Right, Routledge, ISBN 0-415-21494-7
- Gangadean, A.K. (2009). "The Quest for the Universal Global Science". Meditations of Global First Philosophy: Quest for the Missing Grammar of Logos. SUNY series in Western Esoteric Traditions. State University of New York Press. ISBN 978-0-7914-7606-2.
- Hahn, L.E.; Auxier, R.E.; Stone, L.W. Jr., eds. (2001). The Library of Living Philosophers n° 28: The Philosophy of Seyyed Hossein Nasr. Chicago: Open Court. ISBN 978-0-812-69413-0.
- Howard, D. (2011). Being Human in Islam: The Impact of the Evolutionary Worldview. Culture and Civilization in the Middle East. Taylor & Francis. ISBN 978-1-136-82027-4.
- Jahanbegloo, Ramin (2010). In Search of the Sacred: A Conversation with Seyyed Hossein Nasr on His Life and Thought. Santa Barbara, CA: Praeger. ISBN 978-0-31338-324-3.
- Kalin, Ibrahim (2015), "Guénon, Rene (1886–1951)", in Leaman, Oliver (ed.), The Biographical Encyclopedia of Islamic Philosophy, Bloomsbury Publishing
- Khoei, Ehsan Shakeri; Arabshahi, Zohreh (2013). "Tradition in Seyyed Hossein Nasr and Dariush Shayegan's Thought". International Research Journal of Applied and Basic Sciences. 7 (7): 398–404.
- King, Sallie B (2000). "The Philosophia Perennis and the Religion of the World". In Hahn, Lewis Edwin; Auxier, Randall E.; Stone Jr., Lucian W. (eds.). The Philosophy of Seyyed Hossein Nasr. Open Court. ISBN 978-0812694147.
- Lakhani, M.A. (2010). "Understanding Tradition". The Timeless Relevance of Traditional Wisdom. Library of perennial philosophy. World Wisdom. ISBN 978-1-935493-19-8.
- Lanzetta, Beverly J. (1996). "The Mystical Basis of Panikkar's Thought". In Prabhu, J. (ed.). The Intercultural Challenge of Raimon Panikkar. Faith meets faith. Orbis Books. ISBN 978-1-57075-056-4.
- Lings, Martin; Minnaar, Clinton (2007), The Underlying Religion: An Introduction to the Perennial Philosophy, World Wisdom, ISBN 978-1-933316-43-7
- Liu, Shu-hsien (2000). "Reflections on Tradition and Modernity: A Response to Seyyed Hossein Nasr from a Neo-Confucian Perspective". In Hahn, Lewis Edwin; Auxier, Randall E.; Stone Jr., Lucian W. (eds.). The Philosophy of Seyyed Hossein Nasr. Open Court. ISBN 978-0812694147.
- Lumbard, Joseph E.B. (2013). "Seyyed Hossein Nasr on Tradition and Modernity". In Marshall, D. (ed.). Tradition and Modernity: Christian and Muslim Perspectives. Georgetown University Press. ISBN 978-1-58901-982-9.
- Moore, Terry (2010). "Introduction". In Jahanbegloo, Ramin (ed.). In Search of the Sacred: a Conversation with Seyyed Hossein Nasr on his Life and Thought. Santa Barbara, CA: Praeger. ISBN 978-0-31338-324-3.
- Oldmeadow, Harry (2010), Frithjof Schuon and the Perennial Philosophy, Word Wisdom, ISBN 978-1-935493-09-9
- Oldmeadow, Harry (2004). Journeys East: 20th Century Western Encounters with Eastern Religious Traditions. Bloomington, IN: World Wisdom. ISBN 978-094153257-0.
- Oldmeadow, Harry (2011), Traditionalism: Religion in the light of the Perennial Philosophy, Sophia Perennis, ISBN 978-1597311311
- Quadir, Tarik M. (2013). Traditional Islamic Environmentalism: The Vision of Seyyed Hossein Nasr. Lanham, MD: University Press of America. ISBN 978-0-7618-6143-0.
- Quinn, W.W. (1997). "The Tradition". The Only Tradition. G - Reference, Information and Interdisciplinary Subjects Series. State University of New York Press. ISBN 978-0-7914-3214-3.
- Sayem, Md. Abu (2019). "The Eco-Philosophy of Seyyed Hossein Nasr". Islamic Studies. 58 (2): 271–295. ISSN 2710-5326.
- Schwindt, Daniel (2016), The Case Against the Modern World: A Crash Course in Traditionalist Thought, CreateSpace Independent Publishing Platform, ISBN 978-1532825347
- Sedgwick, Mark (2004), Against the Modern World: Traditionalism and the Secret Intellectual History of the Twentieth Century, Oxford University Press
- Smith, Huston (1987), "Is There a Perennial Philosophy?", Journal of the American Academy of Religion, 55 (3): 553–566, doi:10.1093/jaarel/LV.3.553, JSTOR 1464070
- Taylor, Bron (2008), Encyclopedia of Religion and Nature, A&C Black

Web-sources
