= Studies in Comparative Religion =

- Discipline: Religious studies
- Language: English

Publication details
- Former name(s): Tomorrow
- History: 1963–1987
- Publisher: World Wisdom
- Frequency: Quarterly

Standard abbreviations
- ISO 4: Stud. Comp. Relig.

Indexing
- ISSN: 0039-3622
- OCLC no.: 1695943

Links
- Journal homepage

Studies in Comparative Religion was a quarterly academic journal published from 1963 to 1987 that contained essays on the spiritual practices and religious symbolism of the world's religions. The journal was notable for the number of prominent Perennialists who contributed to it. It was also notable for being the first English-language journal focused on the subject of traditional studies and comparative religion.

== History ==
The journal was established in 1963 by Francis Clive-Ross, who also served as editor-in-chief and publisher. From 1963 to 1967 the journal was published under the name Tomorrow. Perennialist author William Stoddart also served as an assistant editor for many years. Jacob Needleman, editor of The Penguin Metaphysical Library, published a collection of essays from Studies in Comparative Religion under the title "The Sword of Gnosis". The journal ceased publication in 1987 and the articles were unavailable until 2007, when World Wisdom launched a free on-line archive.
