= Les Marges du christianisme =

2001 encyclopedia by Jean-Pierre Chantin

- Cover of the first edition
- Editor: Jean-Pierre Chantin
- Language: French
- Series: Dictionnaire du monde religieux dans la France contemporaine
- Subject: Cults, western esotericism
- Publisher: Éditions Beauchesne
- Publication date: 2001
- Publication place: France
- Media type: Encyclopedic dictionary
- Pages: 277
- ISBN: 2-7010-1418-2
- OCLC: 48745879

Les Marges du christianisme: "Sectes", dissidences, ésotérisme (transl. The Margins of Christianity: "Cults", Dissidences, Esotericism) is an encyclopedic dictionary of religion edited by Jean-Pierre Chantin. The tenth volume of the Dictionnaire du monde religieux dans la France contemporaine reference book series, it was published in 2001 by Éditions Beauchesne. The volume contains 188 entries written by 41 individual contributors, which is preceded by an introduction that defines the scope of the volume and discusses the history of many of the topics covered.

This volume focuses on marginal and dissident aspects of Christianity, including cults, esoteric groups, and millennialist movements. It received a largely positive critical reception, with praise for its comprehensiveness and neutral tone. Reviewers noted its inclusion of lesser known figures and praised its introduction. Some reviewers criticized the idea behind the volume itself, that of the "margins", and found some inclusions to be poorly suited to the book's scope.

== Publication ==
The work was published in Paris, France in 2001 by Éditions Beauchesne, a publisher focused on religious, spirituality, and history topics. The edition had 277 pages. It is the tenth volume of the Dictionnaire du monde religieux dans la France contemporaine, a series of encyclopedic dictionaries published by Beauchesne which focus on religious aspects. It was edited by Jean-Pierre Chantin, who had previously written his thesis on the Jansenists, a 17th-century Christian theological movement that provoked controversy in France. Chantin was affiliated with Jean Moulin University Lyon 3 at the time of the book's publication.

== Contents ==
The dictionary contains 188 entries written by 41 contributors. The volume's introduction has several sections, written by several authors. The first section, written by Chantin, argues that many significant figures in marginal religious history were rarely discussed in reference works, and were largely absent from earlier volumes in the series. In defining the volume's scope, it limits it to groups of people that are related to Christianity (even if in opposition to it), excluding other faiths. It defines the "margins" of Christianity, and notes that inclusion in the volume depended on the figure's distance from traditional movements as well as their "audience or representativeness".

The categories of "sects", "dissidences" and "esotericism" are defined; the volume also criticizes the term "sectes" (French for "cults") for being imprecise and for sometimes contributing to a media frenzy, hence its presence in quotations in the title. As a result of the influence of the counterculture of the 1960s on some of these groups, the chronological upper limit on inclusion in this volume was set at the 1970s instead of 1962, as in the other volumes; the lower limit in both cases is the year 1800. He defines three types of figures included in the book, split by motivation: conservative, reformist and innovative. Statistically analyzing the profiled personalities, Chantin notes a low percentage of women (at 9%), as well as certain figures that are connected to many others.

The second section, written by Bernard Vignot, includes a history of recent marginal religious developments in France as well as claims of Apostolic succession among minor Christian denominations. Régis Ladous covers the margins of Protestantism in specific, connecting them to new religious movements. The history of attempts to found a "secular religion" in the 18th century is followed by Patrick Cabanel, all of which he deems as failures. Paul Airiau follows the history of millennialist movements and their relationship with the Church; Jacques Maître then discusses the concept of "visionary mysticism": the phenomenon of people claiming contact with the supernatural, from whom they receive some sort of divine message. Following this, Jean-Pierre Laurant defines and follows the history of the term and usage of the word esotericism, describing esoteric works as maintaining a strong connection to Christianity. Serge Caillet discusses the history of "initiatory societies", including neo-Templarism (Knights Templar revival movements) from its founding in the 19th century to the 1990s, as well as Rosicrucianism, and masonic organizations and rites.

A bibliography section for the introduction is included. Then follows the alphabetical dictionary entries, as well as an index.

== Contributors ==
- Paul Airiau
- Arnaud Baubérot
- Christophe Beaufils
- Marc Beret-Allemand
- Christine Bergé
- Bernard Blandre
- Christophe Boudereaux
- Joachim Bouflet
- Philippe Boutry
- Jean-Pierre Brach
- Patrick Cabanel
- Serge Caillet
- Christian Chanel
- Jean-Pierre Chantin
- Pierre Colin
- Antoine Delestre
- Régis Dericquebourg
- Nicole Edelman
- Jean-Christophe Faure
- Vincent Gaussel-Maroix
- Massimo Introvigne
- Guy Janssen
- Régis Ladous
- Augustin Laffay
- Jacqueline Lalouette
- François Laplanche
- Evelyn Latour
- Jean-Pierre Laurant
- Patrick Lequet
- David Mac-Cready
- Bernard Magnouloux
- Jean-François Mayer
- Michel Mendez
- Xavier de Montclos
- Hilaire Multon
- Luc Perrin
- Émile Poulat
- Jérôme Rousse-Lacordaire
- Yvon Tranvouez
- Robert Vanloo
- Bernard Vignot

== Reception ==
Les Marges du christianisme received a positive critical response. Jean Séguy, writing for the Archives de sciences sociales des religions, described it as a "pioneering work" that opened up new avenues, while Denis Pelletier described it as a "fascinating tool". Pierre-Yves Kirschleger said it was a "balanced title" and praised the variety of the entries included. Bernard Joassart praised the volume's comprehensiveness, including figures he considered "serious" as well as genuinely marginal or dangerous figures, though Séguy argued that those included in the volume had "links with one another [that are] difficult for the present compiler to grasp". Pierre Vallin called the book informative and praised the diverse array of people written about, saying all were written by qualified historians.

Several reviewers questioned or criticized the definition or scope of the "margins" as used in the book, and found some of the inclusions and omissions bizarre. Pelletier called the concept at the root of the volume "problematic". He argued the focus on marginality helped it to escape the typical monolithic focus of the study of French religion, but that through this emphasis it paradoxically only further centered Catholicism by defining that as the norm. Theologian and historian Jérôme Rousse-Lacordaire–also the author of a single article in the volume–criticized the book for some odd inclusions, such as Gilbert Bourdin, the founder of Aumism (noting that he was not in any way affiliated to Christianity), or Louis Charbonneau-Lassay (Christian, but in his view not marginal whatsoever). He also said that one of the "see also" references (for Mauchel Lucien) did not have an entry in the book. Despite this, he praised the book as a whole. Vallin said some of the inclusions were poorly suited to the book's scope, either not marginal or having next to no relationship to Christianity.

Several reviewers praised the introduction. Pelletier said the introduction had Chantin give "ample space to some of the specialists he has surrounded himself with." Séguy singled out Cabanel's introductory segment as "illuminating" and Ladous' as "exemplary", and said most contributors to the volume had an "undeniable knowledge of the movements or groups to which the individuals they deal with belong." He however criticized Vignot's introductory section for its usage of the cult concept and for not demonstrating familiarity with the concepts it addressed. Joassart said the book was not only aimed at researchers, but that it would also be useful to Christians trying to "grasp realities that any Christian may encounter" that were initially difficult to comprehend. He praised the book as valuable due to its tone, lacking irony or mockery of the groups discussed.
