= Danièle Hervieu-Léger =

French sociologist

Danièle Hervieu-Léger (born 3 February 1947) is a French sociologist specialized in the sociology of religion.

== Biography ==
A graduate of the Institut d'Études Politiques de Paris with a doctorate in sociology, she is also editor of the journal Archives des sciences sociales de la religion.

She was a researcher at the National Center for Scientific Research (CNRS) from 1974 to 1993.

As president of the École des hautes études en sciences sociales (EHESS) from March 2004 to March 2009, she undertook significant changes in the institution, particularly lowering the level of students before admission to the Master to abandon school diploma for the benefit of aligning the university system of LMD. She has also initiated a relocation of the school outside Paris, in Seine-Saint-Denis, to integrate it into a new academic center for education, now called "Campus Condorcet", whose composition is constantly changing.

In late 2008, Hervieu-Léger was appointed by the Minister of Research, Valérie Pécresse, Chair of the Steering Committee for developing the national strategy of research and innovation, and resigned in 2009.

Among her awards, she received the CNRS Silver Medal in 2001, was named Knight of the Ordre National de la Légion d'Honneur and Officer of the National Order of Merit and the Academic Palms. In 2002 Hervieu-Léger received an honorary doctorate from the Faculty of Theology at Uppsala University, Sweden.

She wrote a number of books and articles, notably on the Catholic Church and on cults.

== Publications ==
- De la mission à la protestation : l'évolution des étudiants chrétiens en France (1965–1970), Paris, Éditions du Cerf, 1973.
- with Bertrand Hervieu, Le retour à la nature : au fond de la forêt, l'État Paris : Éditions du Seuil, 1979.
- with Bertrand Hervieu, Des communautés pour les temps difficiles. Néo-ruraux ou nouveaux moines, préface de Jean Séguy, Paris, Éditions du Centurion, 1983.
- with Françoise Champion, Vers un nouveau christianisme. Introduction à la sociologie du christianisme occidental, Paris, Éditions du Cerf, 1986.
- (dir.) with Roland Ducret and Paul Ladrière, Christianisme et modernité, actes du colloque de L'Arbresle, September 1987, Paris, Éditions du Cerf, 1990.
- (dir.) with Françoise Champion, De l'émotion en religion. Renouveaux et traditions, Paris, Le Centurion, 1990.
- (dir.), La religion au lycée. Conférences au lycée Buffon, 1989–1990, Paris, Éditions du Cerf, 1990.
- (dir.), Religion et écologie, 27 and 28 November 1991, Paris, Éditions du Cerf, 1993.
- La religion pour mémoire, Paris, Éditions du Cerf, 1993.
- (dir.) with Grace Davie, Identités religieuses en Europe, Paris, La Découverte, 1996.
- La religion en mouvement : le pèlerin et le converti, Paris, Flammarion, 1999.
- La religion en miettes ou La question des sectes, Paris, Calmann-Lévy, 2001.
- with Jean-Paul Willaime, Sociologies et religion : approches classiques, Paris, Presses universitaires de France (PUF), 2001.
- Catholicisme, la fin d'un monde, Paris, Bayard, 2003.
- (dir.) with Erwan Dianteill and Isabelle Saint-Martin, La modernité rituelle. Rites politiques et religieux des sociétés modernes, Paris - Budapest - Torino, l'Harmattan, 2004.
