= André Manaranche =

French priest (1927–2020)

- Born: 8 January 1927; Chatou, France
- Died: 12 April 2020 (aged 93); Lille, France
- Occupations: Priest; theologian

André Manaranche (French pronunciation: [ɑ̃dʁe manaʁɑ̃ʃ]; 8 January 1927 – 12 April 2020) was a French priest, theologian, and spiritual writer.

== Biography ==
Born into a peasant family from Auvergne who moved into the Paris suburbs, Manaranche felt called to the priesthood early on. He began his studies at a seminary in Versailles and was ordained on 29 June 1951. He was then sent to the Institut Catholique de Paris for higher studies, and defended a thesis titled Communauté et société dans l'Eglise, inspired by the works of Ernst Troeltsch.

In 1960, Manaranche entered the Jesuit Novitiate in Saint-Martin-d'Ablois, and then earned his master's degree in theology at the Faculté de Fourvière, inspiring him to write Quel salut ? That same year, he published Y a-t-il une éthique sociale-chrétienne ? The work questioned whether one could get into the Kingdom of God based merely on morals. This inspired Henri Desroche to write that this could lead to a non-atheist society.

Manaranche then turned to dogmatic theology, and escaped from Western European culture. He stayed in many French-speaking African countries, such as Senegal, Niger, Benin, Burundi, Rwanda, Madagascar, Réunion, Mauritius, Morocco, and Algeria. He then returned to France at the Séminaire de Paray-le-Monial.

In 1986, Edmond Barbotin, French religious adviser to the International Union of Guides and Scouts of Europe, entrusted Manaranche with the chaplaincy of the Rover Scouts. He aided the annual pilgrimage to Vézelay, where he would attend All Saints' Day. He stayed in this position for ten years.

Due to his many religious works, linguist Bernard Pottier expressed the importance of Manaranche's books.

André Manaranche died on 12 April 2020 in Lille at the age of 93 due to COVID-19.

== Publications ==
- L'Homme dans son univers (1966)
- Prêtres à la manière des apôtres (1967)
- Je crois en Jésus-Christ aujourd'hui (1968)
- Y a-t-il une éthique sociale chrétienne ? (1969)
- Quel salut ? (1969)
- Franc-parler pour notre temps (1970)
- Un chemin de liberté (1971)
- Dieu vivant et vrai (1972)
- L'Existence chrétienne (1973)
- L'Esprit et la Femme (1974)
- Ceci est mon corps (1975)
- Celui qui vient (1976)
- L'Esprit de la loi (1977)
- Attitudes chrétiennes en politique (1978)
- Les Raisons de l'espérance (1979)
- Des noms pour Dieu (1980)
- Le Prêtre, ce prophète (1982)
- Pour nous les hommes, la Rédemption (1984)
- Le monothéisme chrétien (1985)
- Un amour nommé Jésus (1986)
- Rue de l'Evangile (1987)
- Premiers pas dans l'amour (1988)
- En séparant le sable et l'eau… La création (1990)
- Adam, où es-tu ? (1991)
- J'aime mon Église (1992)
- Grâce à Dieu (1993)
- Vouloir et former des prêtres (1994)
- Croyances ou Révélation (1996)
- Tiens la route (1997)
- Questions de Jeunes (1998)
- Jacques Sevin, une identité (1999)
- Déclin ou sursaut de la Foi (2002)
- Jacques Fesch. Du non-sens à la tendresse (2003)
- Dieu en Europe (2003)
- Prêtre. Genèse d'une réflexion (2009)
- Preface to Les yeux de la foi by Pierre Rousselot (2010)
