= Jean-Paul Willaime =

French sociologist

Jean-Paul Willaime (born 1947 in Charleville-Mézières, Ardennes) is a French sociologist specialized in contemporary Protestantism, Christian ecumenism, Secularism and religions, theories and methods in the sociology of religions.

== Cursus ==
Jean-Paul Willaime obtained a PhD in religious science (1975) and in sociology (1984) in the University of Strasbourg. He is the Director of studies at the École Pratique des Hautes Études (EPHE, Religious Studies section), is owner since 1992 of the studies management "History and Sociology of Protestantism" at the Sorbonne. He is also Director of the Institut européen en sciences des religions (Paris), member of the Groupe Société, Religions, Laïcités (GSRL), and since 2007 President of the Société internationale de sociologie des religions. He is a member of the editorial boards of the Archives de sciences sociales des religions (Paris), Social Compass (Louvain) and the Journal of Contemporary Religion (London). He developed the theory of ultramodernism around the issue of practices of secularism in France and Europe. He was awarded the Chevalier of the Légion d'honneur.

== Main works ==
Books

- Profession : pasteur. Sociologie de la condition du clerc à la fin du XXe siècle, Genève, Labor et Fides, 1986.
- La précarité protestante. Sociologie du protestantisme contemporain, Genève, Labor et Fides, 1992.
- Sociologie des Religions, Paris, PUF, 2005, 3rd ed.
- Sociologies et religion. Approches classiques (with Danièle Hervieu-Léger), Paris, PUF, 2001.
- Les mutations contemporaines du religieux (codirected with Jean-Robert Armogathe), Turnhout, Brepols, 2003.
- Europe et religions. Les enjeux du XXIe siècle, Paris, Fayard, 2004.
- Sociologie du protestantisme, Paris, PUF, 2005.
- Des maîtres et des dieux. Écoles et religions en Europe (with Séverine Mathieu), Paris, Belin, 2005.
- Religion and Education in Europe. Developments, Contexts and Debates (ed. with Robert Jackson, Siebren Miedema, Wolfram Weisse), Münster/New-York/München/Berlin, Waxmann, 2007.
- Enseigner les faits religieux, quels enjeux ? (ed. with Dominique Borne), Paris, Armand Colin, 2007.
- Le retour du religieux dans la sphère publique. Vers une laïcité de reconnaissance et de dialogue, Lyon, Editions Olivétan, 2008.
- Religionskontroversen in Frankreich und Deutschland, Matthias Koenig/Jean-Paul Willaime Hg., Hamburg, Hamburger Edition, 2008.
- Lumières, Religions, Laïcité (under the direction of Louis Châtellier, Claude Langlois and Jean-Paul Willaime), Paris, Riveneuve éditions, 2009.
- Les jeunes, l'école et la religion (under the direction of Céline Béraud and Jean-Paul Willaime), Paris, Bayard, 2009.
- Pluralisme religieux et citoyenneté (under the direction Micheline Milot, Philippe Portier and Jean-Paul Willaime), Rennes, Presses Universitaires de Rennes, 2010.
