= Eugène-Albert Puyou de Pouvourville =

Eugène Albert Puyou de Pouvourville (pen name: Matgioi; 7 August 1861 – 30 December 1939) was a French orientalist, mystic, poet, and translator. An influence on René Guénon and a significant figure in the development of Traditionalist philosophy, historian Mark Sedgwick described him as a "Taoist imperialist".

== Biography ==
Pouvourville was born in Nancy into a military family. After resigning from his army commission, he joined the Foreign Legion. In this capacity he took part in several expeditions in French Indochina. His long periods of living in Tonkin and other provinces enabled him to understand Chinese thought. At some point, Pouvourville deserted from the Legion and lived as a fugitive. He was subsequently initiated into two Chinese Triads, in which he was exposed to Taoist practices and beliefs. During an 1890 initiation ritual, he adopted the name "Matgioi", derived from the Vietnamese word mặt giời (sun).

Pouvourville was rescued from punishment for his desertion by the intervention of his father, a senior officer in the French army. He went on to serve as a Vietnamese interpreter and an inspector, but was wounded during the Tonkin insurgency in the early 1890s. He then began writing on both spiritual and political issues.

Pouvourville was a follower of the Christian mystical system Martinism. In 1904, he was consecrated bishop in the Gnostic Church of France taking the name of Tau Simon. René Guénon, who joined this church in 1909, would go on to describe Pouvourville as "one of my Masters" in 1918 and was especially influenced by the latter's scathing criticism of the Catholic Church.

His political writings, which frequently dealt with China and the French colonies in Asia, suggested that there was an existential threat by the "yellow race" against the Western world. This threat was to be averted by cooperation between the European imperial powers and by securing "Western control of Chinese philosophical and sociological resources". Espousing racialist and social Darwinist views of Asia, he considered colonialism a natural process because of the supposed lack of adaptability or development in Asian societies. Over the course of the First World War, he shifted his attention away from Asia and engaged in patriotic anti-German propaganda instead.

Throughout his life and work, he vigorously defended the use of opium. In his more spiritually oriented texts such as La Voie Métaphysique and La Voie Rationale, he presented Taoist doctrines, emphasizing both the principles and the applications of the system.

=== Personal life and death ===
In 1895, Pouvourville briefly married Marthe Marie Mélise Garnier de La Villesbrest, with whom he had a daughter, Andrée-Marthe de Pouvourville. Andrée-Marthe died around 1925.

He died in Paris in 1939.

== Works ==
- Le Tao de Laotseu, translated from Chinese by Matgioi, Librairie de l'Art indépendant, 1894, 48 pp. (rééd. Hachette/BnF, 2012 ISBN 2-01-257159-X, 978-2-01-257159-4
- Le Te de Laotseu, translated from Chinese by Matgioi, Librairie de l'Art indépendant, 1894, 63 pp. (rééd. Hachette /Bibliothèque nationale de France, 2013 ISBN 2-01-280345-8, 978-2-01-280345-9
- L'esprit des races jaunes. « Le Traité des Influences errantes » de Quangdzu, translated from Chinese by Matgioi, Paris, Bibliothèque de la Haute Science, 1896, 51 pp.
- L'Empire du Milieu, Schlercher frère, 1900
- Rimes chinoises, Lemerre, 1904
- La Voie Métaphysique, Paris, Société d'Éditions Contemporaines : Bibliothèque de La Voie, 1905, 168 pp. (Rééd. Les Éditions Traditionnelles, 1956, 1991).
- La Voie Rationnelle, Paris, Société d'Éditions Contemporaines : Bibliothèque de la Voie, 1907, 269 pp. (Rééd. Les Éditions Traditionnelles, 2003).
- La Chine des Lettrés, Librairie Hermétique (Bibliothèque de la Voie), 1910, 160 pp.
- Les Enseignements Secrets de la Gnose - T Simon (Albert de Pouvourville) T Théophane (Léon Champrenaud), Éditions Arche, Milan 1999
- Le Livre de l'opium, sous le pseudonyme de Nguyen Te Duc, réédition Guy Tredaniel, Paris 2002
- Le Cinquième Bonheur, Éd. Kailash, 2004
- L’Art indo-chinois, Librairie-Imprimeries Réunies Ancienne Maison Quantin, 1894. Coll. Bibliothèque de l’enseignement des Beaux-Arts
- Francis Garnier, Plon, 1931
- La Voie - revue mensuelle de haute science - articles à partir du n°1 du 15 avril 1904

== Bibliography ==
- Jean-Pierre Laurant, Matgioi, un aventurier taoïste, Éditions Dervy, 1982 ISBN 2-85076-151-6
- Patrick Laude, Exotisme indochinois et poésie : étude sur l'œuvre poétique d’Alfred Droin, Jeanne Leuba et Albert de Pouvourville, Sudestasie, 1990 ISBN 978-2-85881-068-0
- Several texts by Albert de Pouvourville were read out in Jacques Perrin's movie L'Empire du milieu du sud (2010).
