= Jean Séguy =

French sociologist (1925–2007)

- Séguy, pictured 1990.
- Born: March 5, 1925
- Died: November 9, 2007 (aged 82); Liancourt, Oise, France

Jean Séguy (5 March 1925 – 9 November 2007) was a French sociologist of religions. He was particularly interested in cults, religious conflicts and Christianity. He was also member of the École des hautes études en sciences sociales. He served as editor-in-chief of the journal Archives de sciences sociales des religions between 1980 and 1988.

== Biography ==
He was born in a Catholic family from south-western France on 5 March 1925. In 1970, he became a doctor of Letters, specialized in English literature. Under the influence of Henri Desroche he moved from literature to the Sociology of religion and spent the rest of his career as research director of the CNRS. In 1973, his book Les Conflits du dialogue, on the ecumenical activities of the smaller Christian denominations, consecrated him as a skilled sociologist of religious minorities. He died in Liancourt, Oise, aged 82.

Influenced by the work of Max Weber and Ernst Troeltsch, he was particularly interested in cults, religious conflicts and Christianity (especially Protestantism and its nonconformist sects, Seventh-day Adventism). In 1977, he was the author of a notable thesis on the Anabaptists and Mennonites. He was also member of the École des hautes études en sciences sociales. He served as editor-in-chief of the journal Archives de sciences sociales des religions between 1980 and 1988.

== Bibliography ==
- Les Sectes protestantes dans la France contemporaine, Paris, Beauchesne, 1956.
- Ernst Troeltsch et sa sociologie du christianisme, Paris, Cercle Ernest Renan, 1961.
- Les Conflits du dialogue, Paris, Le Cerf ed., 1973.
- Les Assemblées anabaptistes-mennonites de France, Paris; La Haye, Mouton, 1977.
- Christianisme et société. Introduction à la sociologie de Ernst Troeltsch, Paris, Le Cerf ed., 1980.
- Conflit et utopie, ou Réformer l'Église. Parcours wébérien en douze essais, Paris, Le Cerf ed., 1999.
