= René Guénon =

French intellectual (1886–1951)

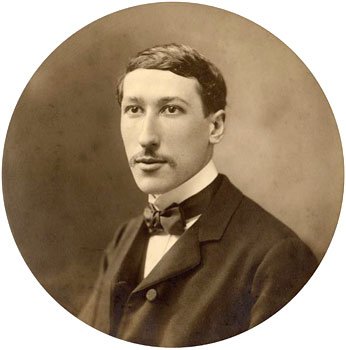
- Portrait from 1925
- Born: René-Jean-Marie-Joseph Guénon; 15 November 1886; Blois, Loir-et-Cher, France
- Died: 7 January 1951 (aged 64); Cairo, Egypt
- Other name: Abdalwahid Yahia
- Spouse: Berthe Loury (m. 1912; died 1928) Fatima Ibrahim (m. 1934)
- Children: 4

Philosophical work
- Era: 20th-century philosophy
- Region: French philosophy; Islamic philosophy; Hindu philosophy
- School: Orientalism; Advaita Vedanta; Sufism; Nondualism; Platonism; Traditionalism
- Main interests: Metaphysics; Symbology; Mythology; Esoterism; Gnosticism; History; Freemasonry; Mathematics; Social criticism
- Notable ideas: Unity of metaphysics; Critique of modernity from the perspective of ancient wisdom traditions; Refounding Western esotericism using Eastern ideas; Guénonian metaphysics

René Jean-Marie-Joseph Guénon (Note: French: [ʁəne ʒan maʁi ʒozɛf ɡenɔ̃]) (15 November 1886 – 7 January 1951), also known as Abdalwahid Yahia (Arabic: عبد الـواحد يحيی; ʿAbd al-Wāḥid Yaḥiā), was a French-Egyptian intellectual who wrote on topics ranging from esotericism, "sacred science" (Note: René Guénon's works dealing with various aspects of "sacred science" are collected in the book which appeared in its first English translation as Fundamental Symbols: The Universal Language of Sacred Science, Quinta Essentia, 1995, ISBN 0-900588-77-2, then, in another translation, as Symbols of Sacred Science, translated by Henry D. Fohr, Sophia Perennis, 2001, ISBN 0-900588-78-0. There were two original French editions, both under the title Symboles fondamentaux de la Science sacrée, Editions Gallimard, Paris. The first contained a foreword followed by notes and comments by Michel Valsan, the second did not contain these additions.) and "traditional studies" (Note: "Traditional studies" is a translation of the French Les Etudes Traditionnelles— the title of the journal in which many of René Guénon's articles were published.) to symbolism and initiation.

In his writings, Guénon proposes to hand down eastern metaphysics and traditions, these doctrines being defined by him as of "universal character", and adapt them to western readers "while keeping strictly faithful to their spirit".

Initiated into Islamic esotericism from as early as 1910 when he was 24, Guénon mainly wrote and published in French, and his works have been translated into more than twenty languages; he also wrote in Arabic an article for the journal Al Marifah.

== Biography ==
René Guénon was born in 1886 in Blois in central France 160 km (100 mi) from Paris. Like most Frenchmen of the time, he was born into a Roman Catholic family, originally from the Angevin, Poitou and Touraine provinces in France; his father was an architect. He was very close to his mother and even more to his aunt Mme Duru, a teacher who taught him to read and write, both devout Catholic women. By 1904, Guénon was living as a student in Paris, where his studies focused on mathematics and philosophy. He was known as a brilliant student, notably in mathematics, in spite of his poor health. In Paris in 1905, due to his health problems he abandoned the preparation for the prestigious École Polytechnique and École normale supérieure admission competitions.

Guénon observed and became involved with some students under the supervision of Papus. Guénon soon discovered that the Esoteric Christian Martinist order, also supervised by Papus, was irregular: he wrote later that this occultist milieu had not received any authentic spiritual transmission. He joined the Gnostic Church of France founded by Léonce Fabre des Essarts (Synesius). While he did not take this Gnostic church seriously either, it enabled him to become the founder and main contributor of a periodical review, La Gnose ("Gnosis"), writing under the pen-name "Tau Palingenius" until 1922, and focusing on oriental spiritual traditions (Taoism, Hinduism and Sufism).

From his incursions into the French occultist and pseudo-Masonic orders, he despaired of the possibility of ever gathering these diverse and often ill-assorted doctrines into a "stable edifice". In his book The Reign of Quantity and the Signs of the Times he also pointed out what he saw as the intellectual vacuity of the French occultist movement, which, he wrote, was utterly insignificant, and more importantly, had been compromised by the infiltration of certain individuals of questionable motives and integrity. Following his desire to join a regular Masonic obedience, he became a member of the Thebah Lodge of the Grande Loge de France following the Ancient and Accepted Scottish Rite.

When Guénon first adopted Islam in 1912, he insisted on recalling that the purely religious concept of an immediate conversion did not apply to his case, indicating he had previous acquaintance with the Islamic faith. (Note: In a letter to T. Grangier dated June 28, 1938, Guénon writes: "mon rattachement aux organisations initiatiques islamiques remonte exactement à 1910" ("my linking with islamic initiatic organizations dates back precisely to 1910").) According to P. Chacornac, Guénon thought that Islam was one of the only real traditions accessible to Westerners, while retaining authentic possibilities in the initiative domain. Guénon married Berthe Loury, his aunt's assistant, in 1912, in a church wedding. His aunt and niece, Françoise Bélile, came to live with them, and, as the couple had no children of their own, they raised Françoise as their own. As his aunt and wife were very pious, Guénon kept his Sufi and Freemason ties secret from them. Berthe later fell ill, dying in 1928, which affected Guénon deeply.

Guénon went on to be discharged from his military service due to his severe health problems; he took this opportunity to study philosophy at the Sorbonne during World War I. In 1917, Guénon began a one-year stay at Sétif, Algeria, teaching philosophy to college students. After World War I, he left teaching to dedicate himself to writing; his first book, Introduction to the Study of the Hindu Doctrines, was published in 1921. From 1925 Guénon became a contributor to a review edited by P. Chacornac, Le Voile d'Isis ("The Veil of Isis"), which after 1935, because of Guénon's influence, became known as Les Études Traditionnelles ("Traditional Studies").

According to indications reproduced by his biographer Paul Chacornac and some of his close friends or collaborators such as Jean Reyor, André Préau and Frans Vreede, it is possible that René Guénon became acquainted with the initiatic lineage of Shankaracharya, (Note: Frans Vreede a close friend of Guénon also claimed the same, cf. René Guénon et l’actualité de la pensée traditionnelle in Actes du colloque international de Cerisy-la-Salle : 13-20 juillet 1973, Ed. du Baucens, 1977, cité in P. Feuga) and with Taoism, due to his friendship with Georges-Albert Puyou de Pouvourville, known under the pen-name Matgioi. Pouvourville was initiated into Taoism in Tonkin, Vietnam (circa 1887–1891) by a village chief: the Tong-Song-Luat (the 'Master of Sentences'). Paul Chacornac hypothesized that Guénon would also have received a direct transmission of Taoism via the younger son of the Master of Sentences, Nguyen Van Cang, who came to France with Pouvourville and stayed for a while in Paris. Most biographers recognize that the encounter which marked his life and his work the most is that with Hindus, with at least one of whom having played the role of instructor if not of spiritual teacher. This meeting took place very early during the period of 1904–1909, possibly upon his exact arrival in the occultist world, if not before.

Although the exposition of Hindu doctrines to European audiences had already been attempted in piecemeal fashion at that time by some orientalists, Guénon's Introduction to the Study of the Hindu Doctrines advanced its subject in a uniquely insightful manner, by referring to the concepts of metaphysics and Tradition in their most general sense, which Guénon precisely defined, along with the necessary distinctions and definitions of seemingly unambiguous terms such as religion, tradition, exoterism, esoterism and theology. Guénon explained that his purpose was not to describe all aspects of Hinduism, but to give the necessary intellectual foundation for a proper understanding of its spirit. The book also stands as a harsh condemnation of works presented by certain other European writers about Hinduism and Tradition in general; according to Guénon, such writers had lacked any profound understanding of their subject matter and of its implications. The book also contains a critical analysis of the political intrusions of the British Empire into the subject of Hinduism (and India itself) through Madame Blavatsky's Theosophy. The publication of this book earned him rapid recognition in Parisian circles. René Grousset in his "History of Eastern Philosophy" (1923) already referred to Guénon's work as a "classic". André Malraux would say much later that it was, "At its date, a book capital". On the other hand, Guénon was very disappointed by the reaction of his neo-Thomist friends, his erstwhile supporter Jacques Maritain argued that Guénon's views were "radically irreconcilable with the [Catholic] faith"; he called them a "Hinduist restoration of ancient Gnosis, mother of heresies". After World War II, when Maritain became French Ambassador to the Vatican, he asked for Guénon's work to be listed under the Catholic Index of Prohibited Books, a request which had no effect due to the refusal of Pius XII and the support of Cardinal Eugène Tisserant.

In September 1920, Père Peillaube asked Guénon to write a book against the Theosophical Society. In 1921, Guénon debuted a series of articles in the French Revue de Philosophie, which, along with some supplements, led to the book Theosophy: History of a Pseudo-Religion. His critique of Theosophy was received positively by conservative Catholics. However, his later book Orient et Occident distanced him from his Catholic supporters. During the decade 1920–1930, Guénon began to acquire a broader public reputation, and his work was noted by various major intellectual and artistic figures both within and outside of Paris. Also at this time were published some of his books explaining the "intellectual divide" between the East and West, and the peculiar nature, according to him, of modern civilization: Crisis of the Modern World, and East and West. In 1927 was published the second major doctrinal book of his works: Man and His Becoming according to the Vedânta, and in 1929, Spiritual Authority and Temporal Power. The last book listed offers a general explanation of what Guénon saw as the fundamental differences between "sacerdotal" (priestly or sacred) and "royal" (governmental) powers, along with the negative consequences arising from the usurpation of the prerogatives of the latter with regard to the former. From these considerations, René Guénon traces to its source the origin of the modern deviation, which, according to him, is to be found in the destruction of the Templar order in 1314.

Urged on by some of his friends and collaborators, Guénon agreed to establish a new Masonic Lodge in France founded upon his "Traditional ideals", purified of what he saw as the inauthentic accretions which so bedeviled other lodges he had encountered during his early years in Paris. This lodge was called La Grande Triade ("The Great Triad"), a name inspired by the title of one of Guénon's books. The first founders of the lodge, however, separated a few years after its inception. Nevertheless, this lodge, belonging to the Grande Loge de France, remains active today.

In 1930, Guénon left Paris for Cairo, where he met with Abdalhaqq-Léon Champrenaud, and Abdalhadi Alaqhili, formerly known as John-Gustaf Aguéli, to be initiated into a Sufi order of Islam. When he arrived, his outward behaviour had changed and he had completely immersed himself in the popular Islamic milieu of the city. Guénon went on to be initiated into the Shadhili order by Aguéli, receiving the name "Abd al-Wāḥid Yaḥiā" (“John, Servant of the One”). Agueli and Champrenaud on the other hand had been initiated by Sheikh Abderrahman Elish Elkebir: Guénon sought to meet Sheikh Elkebir himself, him having been the master of the Sufi spiritual lineage with which he was affiliated, but unfortunately he had just died, hence he chose to make dhikr at his gravesite instead. Guénon went on to meet Sheikh Salama Radi, the succeeding Qutb, the highest authority of the Shadhilite branch to which Guénon belonged, after the death of Sheikh Abderrahman Elkebir. Several testimonies certify that he became Guénon's final teacher. He lived for seven years in the medieval-style Islamic quarters around the Khan el-Khalili and often attended al-Azhar University, an intellectual center of Sunni Muslim scholarship.

One morning, at dawn, while praying at the Seyidna el Hussein mosque, in front of the mausoleum housing the remains of Husayn ibn Ali, he met Sheikh Mohammad Ibrahim, an elderly lawyer with whom he became very close. Guénon married Ibrahim's youngest daughter in 1934, with whom he had four children. In 1937, thanks to the generosity of an English admirer of Guénon's called John Levy, the couple became owners of a small villa, the "Villa Fatima" named after Guénon's wife, in the modern district of Duqqi, west of Cairo, at the foot of the pyramids. Guénon hardly ever went out and often refused Western visitors; his address remained a secret. He spent most of his time working in his office, praying in his oratory, and talking to close friends.

In 1949, Guénon obtained Egyptian citizenship. Sedgwick wrote about Guénon's life in Egypt, that while he continued to be interested in Hinduism and other religions, Guénon's own practice was purely Islamic.

René Guénon died on Sunday, 7 January 1951 at the age of 64: his final word was "Allah".

== Writings ==
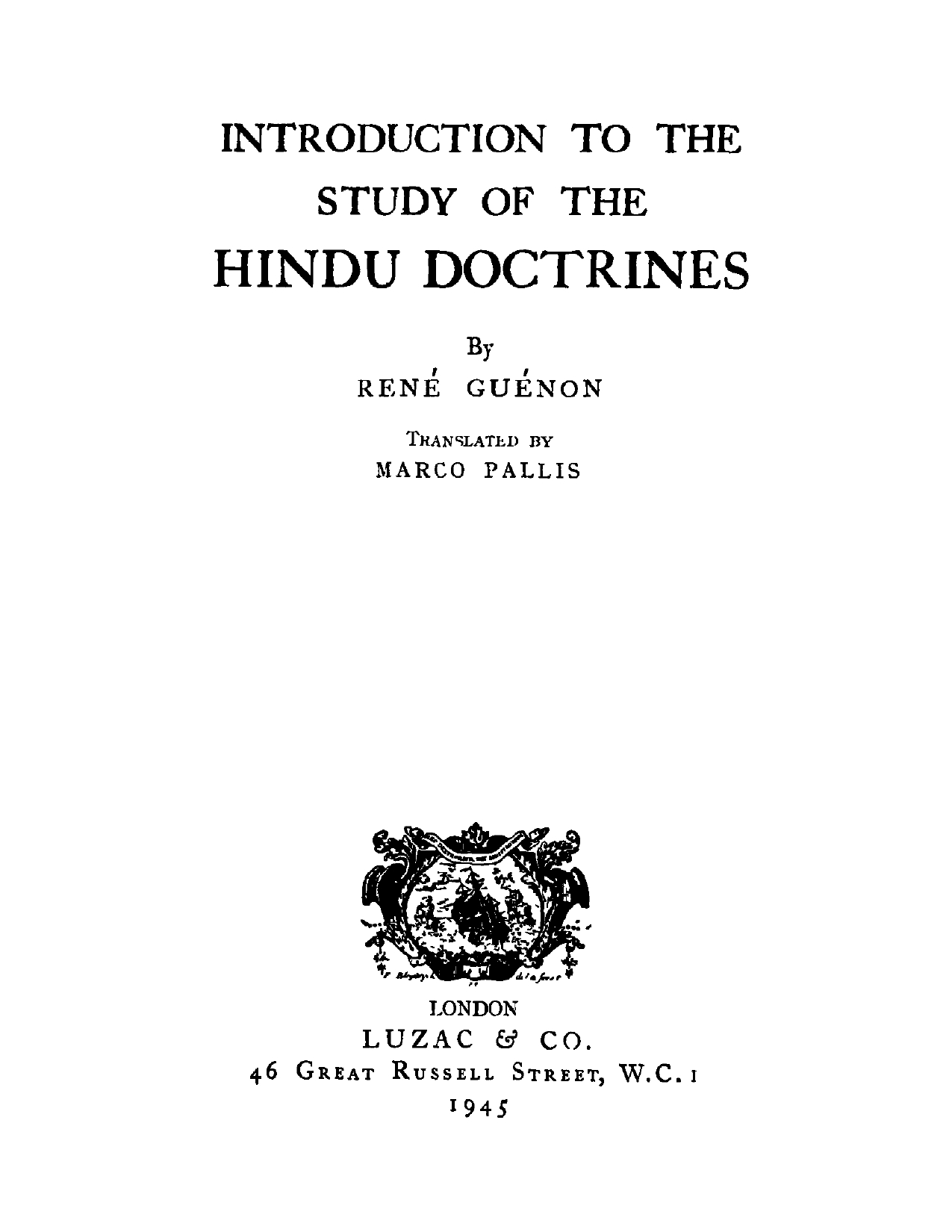
Title page of an English translation of Introduction générale à l'étude des doctrines hindoues

In 1921, Guénon published his first book, an Introduction to the Study of the Hindu Doctrines. His goal, as he writes it, is an attempt at presenting to westerners eastern metaphysics and spirituality as they are understood and thought by easterners themselves, while pointing at what René Guénon describes as all the erroneous interpretations and misunderstandings of western orientalism and "neospiritualism" (for the latter, notably the proponents of Madame Blavatsky's Theosophy).

For all his intellectual's skills might be, it seems unlikely that he succeeded just by himself or with the help of a few books in getting the profound and enlightening understanding of the Vêdânta he seems to have acquired by the age of 23.

René Guénon's work is generally divided into "four major themes":

- An exposition of fundamental metaphysical principles: Introduction to the Study of the Hindu Doctrines which contains the general definition of the term "Tradition" (T always in capital) as Guénon defines it, Man and His Becoming According to the Vedanta, The Symbolism of the Cross, The Multiple States of Being, The Metaphysical Principles of the Infinitesimal Calculus, Oriental Metaphysics.
- Fundamental studies related to Initiation and esoterism, a subject Guénon completely re-exposited from the traditional perspective: Perspectives on Initiation, Initiation and Spiritual Realisation, The Esoterism of Dante, Saint Bernard, Insights into Christian Esoterism, Studies in Freemasonry and Compagnonnage, Studies in Hinduism, etc.
- Studies in symbolism (comprising many articles he wrote for the journal Le Voile d'Isis which became later known under the name Études Traditionnelles). These studies in symbolism were later compiled by Michel Valsan in the posthumous book Symbols of Sacred Science. The studies The Great Triad, Traditional Forms and Cosmic Cycles, Insights into Islamic Esoterism and Taoism and The King of the World (alternately translated as Lord of the World) are also mostly about symbolism.
- Criticism of the modern world and of "neospiritualism": East and West, The Crisis of the Modern World, Spiritual Authority and Temporal Power, Theosophy: History of a Pseudo-Religion, The Spiritist Fallacy and The Reign of Quantity and the Signs of the Times, the latter book being often considered as his masterpiece as an explanation of the modern world from the traditional perspective.

== Some key terms and ideas ==
Guénon's writings make use of words and terms of fundamental signification, which receive a precise definition throughout his books. These terms and words, although receiving a usual meaning and being used in many branches of human sciences, have, according to René Guénon, substantially lost their original significance (e.g. words such as "metaphysics", "initiation", "mysticism", "personality", "form", "matter"). He insisted notably on the danger represented by the perversion of the signification of words which he saw as essential for the study of metaphysics.

== Metaphysical core ==
The exposition of metaphysical doctrines, which forms the cornerstone of Guénon's work, consists of the following books:

- Introduction to the Study of the Hindu Doctrines
- Man and His Becoming According to the Vedanta
- The Multiple States of Being
- Symbolism of the Cross
- Oriental Metaphysics

=== Introduction to the Study of the Hindu Doctrines ===
Introduction to the Study of the Hindu Doctrines, published in 1921, on topics which were later included in the lecture he gave at the Sorbonne on December 17, 1925 ("Oriental Metaphysics"), consists of four parts.

The first part ("preliminary questions") exposes the hurdles that prevented classical orientalism from a deep understanding of eastern doctrines (without forgetting that Guénon had of course in view the orientalism of his time): the "classical prejudice" which "consists essentially in a predisposition to attribute the origin of all civilization to the Greeks and Romans", the ignorance of certain types of relationships between the ancient peoples, linguistic difficulties, and the confusions arising about certain questions related to chronology, these confusions being made possible through the ignorance of the importance of oral transmission which can precede, to a considerable and indeterminate extent, written formulation. A fundamental example of that latter mistake being found in the orientalist's attempts at providing a precise birth date to the Vedas sacred scriptures.

The "general characters of eastern thought" part focuses on the principles of unity of the eastern civilizations, and on the definition of the notions of "tradition" and "metaphysics". Guénon also proposes a rigorous definition of the term "religion", which he saw as "the conjunction of three elements", that being a dogma, a moral law, and a form of worship. He also goes on to state the proper differences between "tradition", "religion", "metaphysics" and "philosophical system". The relations between "metaphysics" and "theology" are also explored, and the fundamental terms of "esoterism" and "exoterism" are introduced. A chapter is devoted to the idea of "metaphysical realization". The first two parts state, according to Guénon, the necessary doctrinal foundations for a correct understanding of Hindu doctrines.

=== Man and His Becoming According to the Vedanta ===
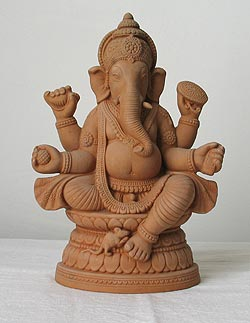
Ganesha, "Lord of meditation and mantras", "Lord of Knowledge", and "Lord of Categories", would be displayed in the front page cover of the Symbolism of the Cross's original edition

The Introduction to the study of the Hindu doctrines had, among its objectives, the purpose of giving the proper intellectual basis to promote openness to the study of eastern intellectuality. The study of Hindu doctrines is continued in his book Man and His Becoming According to the Vedanta. There he described a part of the doctrine of Vêdânta according to the formulation of Adi Shankara focusing on the human being: his constitution, his states, his posthumous future, the purpose of existence being presented as identity with the Self. (Âtmâ), the transcendent principle of being, identical to Brahma. The "Self" is the essence, the transcendent "Principle" of being, the human being for example. He specifies that "Personality" comes under the order of universal principles: pure metaphysics has for its domain the "Universal", which is without common measure with the domain of the general and of what is designated by the term of categories in philosophy.

In the history of Western thought, only the transcendentals of scholastic theology belong to the "Universal". The "Self" contains all the states of manifestation but also all the states of non-manifestation. If one considers the "Self" only as the principle of manifested states only, it identifies with Ishvara, the notion closest to the Creator God in Hindu doctrines, according to him. All manifested states represent "manifestation", or "Universal Existence," where everything is related. Nothing can fundamentally be isolated from the rest of the manifestation: there is oneness of “Existence”. Like the principle of manifestation, the "Being" (Sat, or Ishvara if considered in a personalized form), is "One." He then sets out the purpose of human existence: the realization of identity with the "Self" understood as the true essence of the human being. He adds that the "Self" resides in the vital center of the human being symbolized by the heart. According to Guénon, according to all spiritual traditions, the heart is "the seat of Intelligence" understood as supra-rational knowledge, the only form of knowledge allowing "Supreme Identity". This supra-rational knowledge (and especially not irrational) is Buddhi, the higher intellect, introduced by Guénon in chapter VII of his book. For its part, the brain is the instrument of the mind, in particular of rational thought, indirect knowledge. It is Buddhi, who resides in the heart of every being, who ensures the unification between all the states of existence and the oneness of "Existence".

The general considerations of the "Self", the "Unmanifested" and the universal "Manifestation" are introduced according to Advaita Vêdânta: the "universal Manifestation" is all that exists and its development is constantly being developed, towards destiny. The "Unmanifested" is all that is beyond universal Manifestation, so that it can only be designated by negation. The second chapter also establishes the fundamental distinctions between the "Self" and the ego, or "personality" and "individuality", the first being the only One that is "absolutely real". These ideas are declined in different denominations depending, for a first part, on the different degrees of reality considered, and also from the "transcendent" and "immanent" point of views that can be contemplated: Ishwara is the "Divine personality" or the Principle of universal Manifestation. It is unmanifested, for the Principle of Manifestation cannot be Itself manifested (this is in relation to the symbolism of "black heads": Ishwara has Its head in "darkness"). Atmâ, Paramâtmâ, Brahmâ: the realization that the Self, "in relation to any being whatsoever, is in reality identical to Atmâ", constitutes the heart of the Hindu doctrine of "delivrance" or "moksha", and that doctrine is absolutely identical to what Islamic esoterism calls the "Supreme Identity" (that is to say, expressed in Hindu terms, the identity of Atmâ and Brahmâ):

"the 'Supreme Identity', according to an expression borrowed from Islamic esoterism, where the doctrine on this and on many other points is fundamentally the same as in the Hindu tradition, in spite of great differences in form."

The rigor and quality of the presentation refer to the quality of the Hindu master whom Guénon had met during the period 1905-1909 and about whom he does not breathe a word in his book: some supposed that he must have studied the texts cited directly with these Hindus. The book was very well received and was the subject of many glowing reviews in the press on the right and on the left, sometimes in newspapers with very large circulation. Paul Claudel spoke about the book placing it next to those of Sylvain Lévi and René Grousset and the Islamologist Louis Massignon wanted to meet Guénon: the meeting took place that year (1925).

Paul Chacornac quotes a letter from Roger de Pasquier: "It was not until 1949, during a stay in Bénarès, that I learned of René Guénon's work. It had been recommended to me to read by Alain Danielou [who was then living in India in the entourage of Swami Karpatri, a master of Advaita Vêdânta], who had submitted Guénon's works to orthodox pundits. The verdict of these was clear: of all the Westerners who dealt with Hindu doctrines, only Guénon, they said, really understood the meaning. The academic Michel Hulin, a specialist in Indian philosophy, wrote in 2001 that Man and his future according to the Vedânta remains "one of the most rigorous and profound interpretations of the Shankarian doctrine".

=== The Symbolism of the Cross ===
The Symbolism of the Cross is a book "dedicated to the venerated memory of Esh-Sheikh Abder-Rahman Elish El-Kebir". Its goal, as Guénon states it, "is to explain a symbol that is common to almost all traditions, a fact that would seem to indicate its direct attachment to the great primordial tradition". To alleviate the hurdles bound to the interpretations of a symbol belonging to different traditions, Guénon distinguishes synthesis from syncretism: syncretism consists in assembling from the outside a number of more or less incongruous elements which, when so regarded, can never be truly unified. Syncretism is something outward: the elements taken from any of its quarters and put together in this way can never amount to anything more than borrowings that are effectively incapable of being integrated into a doctrine "worthy of that name". To apply these criteria to the present context of the symbolism of the cross:

syncretism can be recognized wherever one finds elements borrowed from different traditional forms and assembled together without any awareness that there is only one single doctrine of which these forms are so many different expressions or so many adaptations related to particular conditions related to given circumstances of time and place.

A notable example of syncretism can be found, according to Guénon, in the "doctrines" and symbols of the Theosophical Society. Synthesis on the other hand is carried essentially from within, by which it properly consists in envisaging things in the unity of their principle. Synthesis will exist when one starts from unity itself and never loses sight of it throughout the multiplicity of its manifestations; this moreover implies the ability to see beyond forms and an awareness of the principal truth. Given such awareness, one is at liberty to make use of one or another of those forms, something that certain traditions symbolically denote as "the gift of tongues". The concordance between all traditional forms may be said to represent genuine "synonymies". In particular, René Guénon writes that the cross is a symbol that in its various forms is encountered almost everywhere, and from the most remote of times. It is therefore far from belonging peculiarly to the Christian tradition, and the cross, like any other traditional symbol, can be regarded according to manifold senses.

Far from being an absolute and complete unity in himself, the individual in reality constitutes but a relative and fragmentary unity. The multiplicity of the states of the being, "which is a fundamental metaphysical truth", implies the effective realization of the being's multiple states and is related to the concept that various traditional doctrines, including Islamic esoterism, denote by the term 'Universal Man': in Arabic al-Insân-al-kâmil is at the same time 'Primordial man' (al-Insân-al-qadîm); it is the Adam Qadmon of the Hebrew Kabbalah; it is also the 'King' (Wang) of the Far-Eastern tradition (Tao Te King chap. 25). The conception of the 'Universal Man' establishes a constitutive analogy between universal manifestation and its individual human modality, or, to use the language of Western Hermeticism, between the 'macrocosm' and the 'microcosm'.

From these considerations, the geometrical symbolism of the cross, in its most universal signification, can be contemplated: most traditional doctrines symbolize the realization of 'Universal Man' by a sign that is everywhere the same because, according to Guénon, it is one of those directly attached to the primordial tradition. That sign is the sign of the cross, which very clearly represents the manner of achievement of this realization by the perfect communion of all states of the being, harmoniously and conformably ranked, in integral expansion, in the double sense of "amplitude" and "exaltation".

=== The Multiple States of Being ===
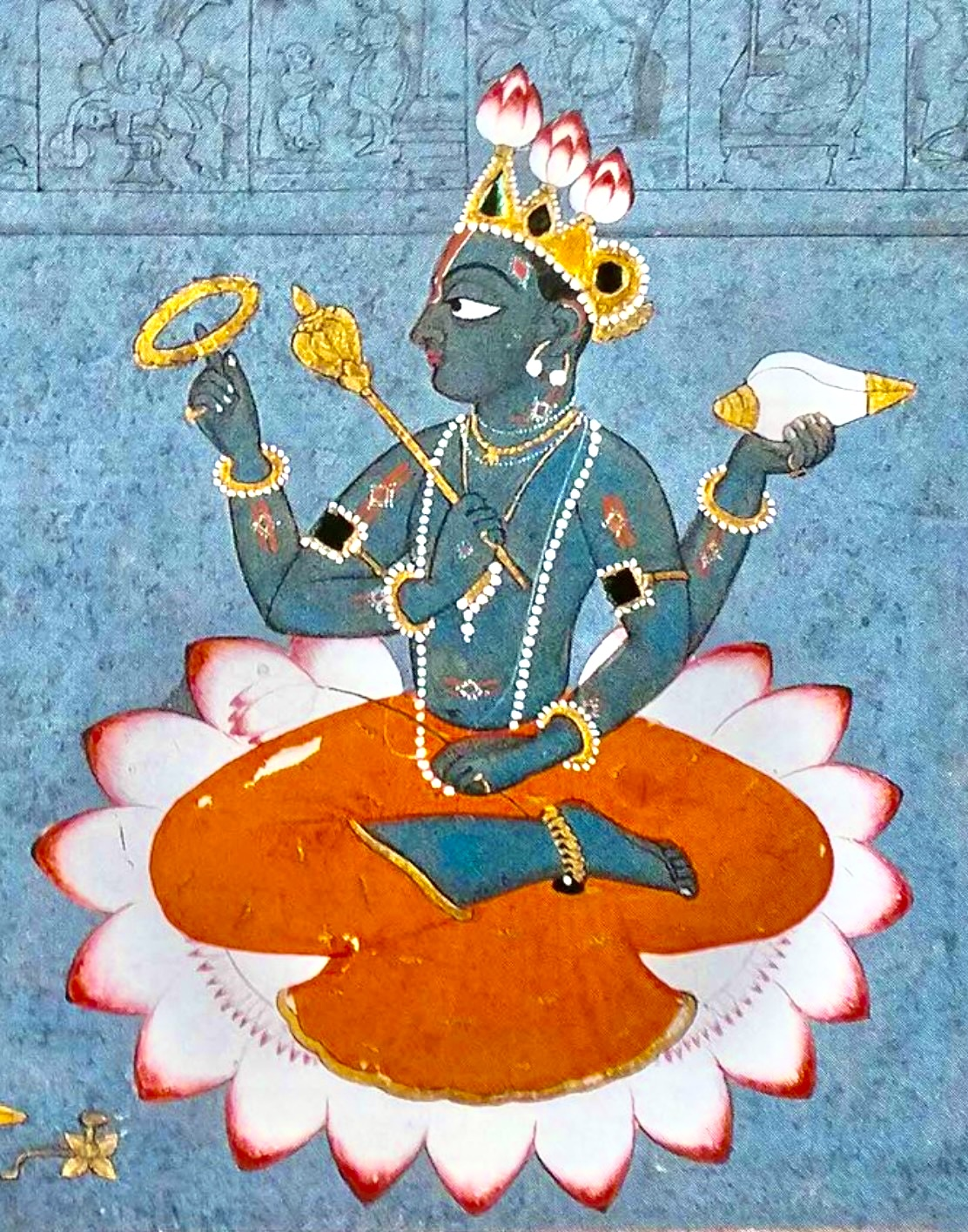
Narayana is one of the names of Vishnu in the Hindu tradition, signifies literally "He who walks on the Waters", with an evident parallel with the Gospel tradition. The "surface of the Waters", or their plane of separation, is described as the plane of reflection of the "Celestial Ray". It marks the state in which the passage from the individual to the universal is operative, and the well-known symbol of "walking on the Waters" represents emancipation from form, or liberation from the individual condition (René Guénon, The multiples states of the Being, chapter 12, "The two chaoses").

This book expands on the multiple states of Being, a doctrine already tackled in The Symbolism of the Cross, leaving aside the geometrical representation exposed in that book "to bring out the full range of this altogether fundamental theory". First and foremost is asserted the necessity of the "metaphysical Infinity", envisaged in its relationship with "universal Possibility". "The Infinite, according to the etymology of the term which designates it, is that which has no limits", so it can only be applied to what has absolutely no limit, and not to what is exempted from certain limitations while being subjected to others like space, time, quantity, in other words all countless other things that fall within the indefinite, fate and nature. There is no distinction between the Infinite and universal Possibility, simply the correlation between these terms indicates that in the case of the Infinite, it is contemplated in its active aspect, while the universal Possibility refers to its passive aspect: these are the two aspects of Brahma and its Shakti in the Hindu doctrines. From this results that "the distinction between the possible and the real [...] has no metaphysical validity, for every possible is real in its way, according to the mode befitting its own nature". This leads to the metaphysical consideration of the "Being" and "Non-Being":

If we [...] define Being in the universal sense as the principle of manifestation, and at the same time as comprising in itself the totality of possibilities of all manifestation, we must say that Being is not infinite because it does not coincide with total Possibility; and all the more so because Being, as the principle of manifestation, although it does indeed comprise all the possibilities of manifestation, does so only insofar as they are actually manifested. Outside of Being, therefore, are all the rest, that is all the possibilities of non-manifestation, as well as the possibilities of manifestation themselves insofar as they are in the unmanifested state; and included among these is Being itself, which cannot belong to manifestation since it is the principle thereof, and in consequence is itself unmanifested. For want of any other term, we are obliged to designate all that is thus outside and beyond Being as "Non-Being", but for us this negative term is in no way synonym for 'nothingness'.

For instance, our present state, in its corporeal modality, is defined by five conditions: space, time, "matter" (i.e. quantity), "form", and life, and these five conditions enter into correlation with the five corporeal elements (bhutas of the Hindu doctrine, see below) to create all living forms (including us in our corporeal modalities) in our world and state of existence. But the universal Manifestation is incommensurably more vast, including all the states of existence that correspond to other conditions or possibilities, yet Being Itself is the principle of universal Manifestation.

This involves the foundation of the theory of multiple states and the metaphysical notion of the "Unicity of the Existence" (wahdatul-wujûd) as it is for instance developed in Islamic esoterism by Mohyddin Ibn Arabi. The relationships of unity and multiplicity lead to a more accurate "description" of the Non-Being: in it, there can be no question of a multiplicity of states, since this domain is essentially that of the undifferentiated and even of the unconditioned: "the undifferentiated cannot exist in a distinctive mode", although we still speak analogously of the states of the non-manifestation: Non-Being is "Metaphysical Zero" and is logically anterior to unity; that is why Hindu doctrine speaks in this regard only of "non duality" (advaita). Analogous considerations drawn from the study of dream state help understand the relationships of unity and multiplicity: in dream state, which is one of the modalities of the manifestation of the human being corresponding to the subtle (that is, non-corporeal) part of its individuality, "the being produces a world that proceeds entirely from itself, and the objects therein consist exclusively of mental images (as opposed to the sensory perceptions of the waking state), that is to say of combinations of ideas clothed in subtle forms that depend substantially of the subtle form of the individual himself, moreover, of which the imaginal objects of a dream are nothing but accidental and secondary modifications". Then, René Guénon studies the possibilities of individual consciousness and the mental ("mind") as the characteristic element of the human individuality. In chapter X ("Limits of the Indefinite"), he comes back to the notion of metaphysical realization (moksha, or "Supreme identity"). A superior signification of the notion of "darkness" is then introduced, most notably in the chapter entitled "The two chaoses", which describes what is happening during the course of spiritual realization when a disciple leaves the domain of "formal possibilities". The multiples states of the Being is essentially related to the notion of "spiritual hierarchies", which is found in all traditions. Hence is described the universal process of the "realization of the Being through Knowledge".

=== Oriental Metaphysics ===
Guénon gave a conference at La Sorbonne on December 17, 1925. This conference was organized by the “group of Philosophical and Scientific Studies for the Examination of New Ideas” founded by Doctor René Allendy. The objective of this association was to reflect on a European union based on overcoming national rivalries and to promote rapprochement between the East and the West. Guénon repeatedly explained that a union could only be based on a restoration of true "intellectuality" which, alone, could transcend the differences between cultures and this is the reason why he clarified what he called by real “intellectuality” during his speech. The Sorbonne conference was published in several parts in the journal Vers Unité in 1926 and then in book form in 1939.

During the conference, Guénon clarified what he called by true "intellectuality" and by "metaphysics". These points were essential for the constitution of a spiritual elite which aimed to reconstitute a union between the peoples. He explained that metaphysics "literally means that which is" beyond physics "", i.e. what is beyond nature. He insisted on the fact that this requires going beyond the manifested world and therefore all phenomena. Metaphysics therefore has nothing to do with phenomena even with extraordinary phenomena. Metaphysics must go beyond the domain of being and must therefore go beyond ontology. He added: “metaphysics is supra-rational, intuitive [beyond subject-object duality] and immediate knowledge” (while rational knowledge is indirect). The path to this knowledge requires "only one essential preparation, and that is theoretical knowledge [implied by traditional doctrines]". But, he clarified, all this cannot go far without the most important means which is "the concentration". Guénon then described the different stages of the spiritual path:

- first of all, going beyond the temporal condition to reach "the primordial state" which corresponds to the "sense of eternity". In this state, one "is therefore freed from time, the apparent succession of things is transmuted into [...] simultaneity". This is the ultimate goal of the "lesser mysteries" (with the signification given by the ancient Greeks to the classical names of lesser and greater mysteries).
- attainment of supra-individual (non-human) states beyond form (which can be obtained by intuitive knowledge which goes beyond the division between subject and object).
- attainment of "the absolutely unconditioned state freed from all limitation" even beyond the separation between being and non-being. He wrote, in fact, "it is beyond being that this goal resides". This state is reached upon "Deliverance" (Moksha in the Hindu doctrine). This is the goal of the "greater mysteries" in the Eleusinian Mysteries.

== Initiation and spiritual realization ==
Hermes' caduceus: example of a symbol associated to the possession of lesser mysteries, and showing an example of horizontal duality (the two snakes' heads are placed in the horizontal dual position, hence referring to apparent dualities such as life and death). In Studies in Hinduism, Guénon mentions a relation between the symbol and the Kundalini shakti.

In his "Introduction to the Study of Hindu Doctrines", Guénon writes that "metaphysics affirms the identity of knowing and being" and that "it does not only affirm it, it realizes it". The effective means of realization are found in what is called initiation. Articles written by him on this subject were collected later in the form of two books including Perspectives on Initiation (1946) and Initiation and Spiritual Realization (published in 1952 after his death).

Guénon declared that the path to this knowledge requires "only one essential preparation, and that is theoretical knowledge [implied by traditional doctrines]". But he clarified, all this cannot go far without the most important means which is "concentration". The rational study of the initiatory texts and the implementation of the rites are of no use if the spiritual transmission has not taken place: for example, the recitation of a mantra is useless without the 'spiritual influence transmitted by the master during the initiation. One cannot initiate oneself alone. Moreover for Guénon, any desire to revive dead traditions (of ancient Egypt, Celts, Germans, etc.) has no meaning. The spiritual laws which govern the spiritual path have nothing to do with the magic or the paranormal phenomena which concern the psychic and not the spiritual: to be attached to these phenomena is an obstacle to the spiritual development. Guénon considers imperative the need to combine esotericism with the corresponding exoterism and not to mix the practices of different traditions: one must practice only one spiritual path (Islam, Christianity, Judaism, etc.)

Perspectives on Initiation, first published at the close of World War II in 1946, extends a series of articles on the central subject of initiation originally written between 1932 and 1938 for Le Voile d'Isis (later renamed Études Traditionnelles). Initiation is introduced as the transmission, by the appropriate rites of a given tradition, of a "spiritual influence". Related articles were later published, in 1952, in the posthumous collection Initiation and Spiritual Realization. While the notion of initiation is introduced in the most general setting, it is impossible, writes Guénon, to write a complete and comprehensive book on the subject "for an indefinite number of questions could be raised – the very nature of the subject resisting any set limit". However, the subject of initiation being contemplated from a general point of view, the goal of Guénon goes beyond an introduction to the subject and, doing so, to make clear distinctions between what is relevant to initiation and what is not. First, in particular, he insists on clarifying his position on the essential differences between "mysticism" and initiation so that, to him, initiation is, by its very nature, incompatible with mysticism:

In the case of mysticism the individual simply limits himself to what is presented to him and to the manner in which it is presented, having himself no say in the matter [...] In the case of initiation, on the contrary, the individual is the source of initiative towards 'realization', pursued methodically under rigorous and unremitting control, and normally reaching beyond the very possibilities of the individual as such.

For Guénon, there are traditions where the esoteric/exoteric separation does not formally exist (Hinduism, Tibetan Lamaism). In China, the two are totally separate (Confucianism for exotericism and Taoism for esotericism) with relative autonomy from each-other. The two overlap in Islam (with Sharia and Tariqa) and Judaism (with the Mosaic Law and Kabbalah) where exotericism has autonomy from esotericism whereas esotericism remains grounded by the former. In the West, Guénon claims that Christianity had a strong esoteric character at its origin but that to save the Roman world, it exteriorized itself in a providential way: the Christian sacraments then went from esoteric to exoteric status (which would become a point of contention among some of his interlocutors). In the Middle Ages, Christian initiation groups existed, the most important was the order of the Temple. After the destruction of this order, Christian esotericism became more and more closed and separated from the official Church. Freemasonry and Compagnonnage inherited the last Western initiation rites. For Guénon, the Catholic Church has retained its authentic religious dimension but has lost its esoteric dimension no longer making access to final deliverance possible. Mysticism since the Renaissance is a passive path inferior to the initiatory path: it allows to reach the divine but in an indirect and often uncontrollable way. Freemasonry has kept initiatory transmissions but, in addition to the fact that it is about low initiations (initiations of trades mixed with remains of chivalrous initiations), its passage from operative masonry to speculative masonry in the 18th century prevents the transition from virtual initiation to effective initiation, the latter had to be done by exercising the profession in question. More seriously still, Masonry turned in part from its initiatory role in the 19th century to devote itself to politics in a more anti-traditional (anti-Catholic) direction. Guénon has long kept the hope of an alliance between some members of the Catholic Church and Masonry to reconstitute a complete elite (combining the Catholic religion and Christian Masonry). He envisioned that Eastern masters could spiritually revive these traditions from time to time.

The application of the distinction between esotericism and exoterism to Christianity, Guénon's position on mysticism and the assertion that the Catholic sacraments have lost their initiatory character have been the subject of strong criticism. It is this point which led to the rupture between Guénon and Frithjof Schuon. Guénon's ideas on esotericism had a significant impact on Freemasonry especially in Latin speaking countries. According to David Bisson, the redefinition of esotericism by René Guénon is considered "as an essential chapter in the history of Western esotericism - as it is conceived and developed by Antoine Faivre": the latter emphasized the importance of Guénon and the currents that claim to be based on his notion of Tradition in the esoteric Western currents.

On the subject of initiation, Guénon clarifies the signification given by the ancient Greeks to the classical names of lesser and greater mysteries: "they are not different "types" of initiations, but stages or degrees of a same initiation". Lesser mysteries lead to the "perfection of the human state", in other words to "something traditionally designated by the restoration of the "primordial state", a state that Dante, in the Divine comedy, relates symbolically to the "terrestrial paradise". On another hand, "greater mysteries" refer properly to "the realization of supra-human states"; they correspond to the Hindu doctrine of "deliverance" (Moksha) and to what Islamic esoterism calls the "realization of the Universal Man": in that latter tradition, "lesser" and "greater" mysteries correspond exactly to the signification of the terms "el-insân el-qadîm" (the Primordial Man) and "el-insan el-kâmil" (the Universal Man). These two phases are related to an interpretation of the symbolism of the cross with the notions of "horizontal" and "vertical" realization. They also correspond respectively to what is traditionally designated in western hermeticism by the terms royal initiation and sacerdotal initiation.

== Other writings in metaphysics, hermeticism and cosmological sciences ==
=== Hindu doctrine of cosmic cycles ===
Guénon introduces some preliminary aspects of a particular (and extremely complex) cosmological science: the Hindu doctrine of cosmic cycles, for instance in the article "Some remarks on the doctrine of cosmic cycles". He writes that giving an overview of this theory and its equivalents in different traditional forms is merely an impossible task "not only because the question is very complex in itself, but specially owing to the extreme difficulty of expressing these things in a European language, and in a way that is intelligible to the present-day Western mentality, which has had no practice whatsoever with this kind of thinking". All that is possible in this respect is to clarify a few points with remarks "which can only raise suggestions about the meaning of the doctrine in question rather than really explaining it".

In the most general sense of the term, a cycle must be considered as "representing the process of development of some state of manifestation, or, in the case of minor cycles, of one of the more or less restricted and specialized modalities of that state". Moreover, in virtue "of the law of correspondence which links all things in universal Existence, there is necessarily and always a certain analogy, either among the different cycles of the same order or among the principal cycles and their secondary divisions". This allows to use one and the same mode of expression when speaking about the cycles, although this must often be understood only symbolically, and this allude here especially to the 'chronological' form under which the doctrine of cycles is presented: since a Kalpa represents the total development of a world, that is to say of a state or degree of universal existence, "it is obvious that one cannot speak literally about its duration, computed according to some temporal measure, unless this duration relates to a state of which time is one of the determination, as in our world". Everywhere else, this duration is only purely symbolic and must be transposed analogically, for temporal succession is only an image both logical and ontological, of 'extra-temporal' series of causes and effects.

Inside a Kalpa, the Manvantaras, or eras of successive Manus, are 14 in number, forming two septenary series of which the first includes both past Manvantaras and the present one, and the second future Manvantaras: the present humanity is in the seventh Manvantara of the Kalpa. These two series can be linked with those of the seven Svargas and the seven Patalas, "which, from the point of view of the hierarchy of the degrees of existence or of universal manifestation, represent the states respectively higher and lower than the human state". Another correspondence concerns the seven dvīpa (devanagari: द्वीप) or 'regions' into which the world is divided. Although according to the proper meaning of the word that designates them these are represented as islands or continents distributed in a certain way in space, one must be careful not to take this literally and to regard them simply as different parts of present-day earth: Guénon writes that they 'emerge' in turns and not simultaneously, and only one of them is manifested in the sensible domain over the course of a certain period. If that period is a Manvantara, one will have to conclude that each dvīpa will have to appear twice in the Kalpa or once in each of the just mentioned septenary series, which correspond to one another inversely as do all similar cases, particularly the Svargas and the Patalas, one can deduce that the order of appearance for the dvīpa will likewise have to be, in the second series, the inverse of what it was in the first: this is matter of different 'states' of the terrestrial world rather than 'regions' properly speaking. The Jambudvīpa really represents the entire earth in its present state (not only in its corporeal modality), and if it is said to extend to the south of Meru, the 'axial' mountain around which our world revolves,

"this is because Meru is identified symbolically with the North Pole, so that the whole earth is really situated to the south with respect to it. To explain this more completely it would be necessary to develop the symbolism of the directions of space according to which the Dvīpas are distributed, as well as correspondences existing between this spatial symbolism and the temporal symbolism on which the whole doctrine of cycles rest".

This way of envisaging the dvīpas, writes René Guénon, is also confirmed by concordant data from other traditions which also speak of 'seven lands' particularly Islamic esoterism and Hebrew Kabbalah. Thus in the latter, even while these 'seven lands' are outwardly represented by as many divisions of the land of Canaan, they are related to the reigns of the 'seven kings of Edom' which clearly correspond to the seven Manus of the first series; and all are included in the 'Land of the Living' which represents the complete development of our world considered as realized permanently in its principal state.

"We can note here the coexistence of two points of view, one of succession, which refers to the manifestation in itself, and the other of simultaneity, which refers to its principle or to what one could call its 'archetype'; and at root the correspondence between these two points of view is in a certain way equivalent to that between temporal symbolism and spatial symbolism to which we just alluded in connection with the Dvīpas of the Hindu tradition".

"In Islamic esoterism, the 'seven lands' appear, perhaps even more explicitly, as so many tabaqāt or 'categories' of terrestrial existence, which coexist and in a way interpenetrate, but only one of which is presently accessible to the senses while the others are in a latent state and can only be perceived exceptionally and under special conditions"; these too are manifested outwardly in turn, during the different periods that succeed one another in the course of the total duration of this world. On the other hand, each of the 'seven lands' is governed by a Qutb or 'pole', which thus corresponds very clearly to the Manu of the period during which the land is manifested; and these seven Aktab are subordinated to the supreme 'pole' just as the different Manus are subordinate to the Adi-Manu or primordial Manu; but because these 'seven lands' coexist, they also in a certain respect exercise their functions in a permanent and simultaneous way. "It is hardly necessary", writes Guénon, "to point out that the designation of 'Pole' is closely related to the polar symbolism of Meru. Meru itself has in any case its exact equivalent in the Mountain of Qāf in Islamic tradition. And the seven terrestrial 'Poles' are considered to be reflections of the seven celestial 'poles' which preside respectively over the seven planetary heavens; "and this naturally evokes the correspondence with the Svargas in Hindu doctrine, which shows in sum the perfect concordance in this regard between the two traditions".

The Yugas are the divisions of the Manvantara, and they are four in number, which correspond, in the spatial symbolism, to the four cardinal points. There is an obvious equivalence with the four Yugas and the four ages of gold, silver, bronze and iron of the Greco-Latin antiquity. Guénon writes that the figures given as durations of the Yugas in various Indian texts are to be taken symbolically, their actual exact determination needs in-depth and specific knowledge as these numbers are often written, for various traditional reasons, with an undetermined number of zeros added to their transcription. Guénon gives indications for the determination of the Yuga's durations: if the total duration of the Manvantara is represented by 10, then the durations of the four Yugas are:

- Krita Yuga or Satya Yuga: 4, corresponding to 25,920 years.
- Treta Yuga: 3, (19,440 years).
- Dvapara Yuga: 2, (12,960 years).
- Kali Yuga: 1, (6,480 years).

so that the division of the Manvantara is carried out by the formula: 10 = 4 + 3 + 2 + 1 which is, in reverse, that of the Pythagorean Tetraktys. This last formula corresponds to what the language of Western Hermeticism calls 'the circling of the square' and the other to the opposite problem of 'squaring of the circle' which expresses precisely the relation of the end of a cycle to its beginning, that is, the integration of its total development. Guénon writes: "We are presently in an advanced phase of the Kali Yuga".

=== Science of letters in Islam ===
Name of Allāh. Arabic calligraphy. The numerical value of the word Allāh is: 1 + 30 + 30 + 5 = 66. The effective totalization of the being is called 'Moksha' (or 'delivrance') in the Hindu doctrines, and 'Universal Man' in Islamic esoterism, where in the latter he is represented by the couple 'Adam-Eve' (Adam wa Hawwa) and has the same number 66 as Allāh, which may be taken as a means of expressing the 'Supreme Identity' (The Symbolism of the Cross, chapter 3).

Guénon writes that while the knowledge of nirukta unveils inner meanings in Vedic sacred scriptures, in Islam, the science of letters is central in islamic esoterism, where exoterism and esoterism are often compared to the 'shell' (qishr) and the 'kernel' (lubb) or to the circonference and its center. On the subject of esoterism, and its relations with the Islamic doctrine, he refers to the Arabic words tariqah and haqiqah (means and end), and notes that the general meaning of "esoterism" is designated by the term taṣawwuf. According to Guénon, that latter term can only be translated precisely as 'initiation'. And while taṣawwuf refers to any esoteric and initiatic doctrine, he questions the [derivative] term 'sufism' to designate Islamic esoterism. Guénon writes that this term

"has the unfortunate disadvantage of inevitably suggesting by its 'ism' suffix, the idea of a doctrine proper to a particular school, whereas this is not the case in reality, the only schools in question being the turuq, which basically represent the different methods, without there being any possibility of a fundamental difference of doctrine, for 'the doctrine of Unity is unique' (at-tawhidu wahid)".

According to Guénon, the derivation of the word sūfi is undoubtedly unsolvable, "the word having too many proposed etymologies, of equal plausibility, for only one to be true". For him, the word is a purely symbolic name, which, as such, requires no linguistic derivation strictly speaking: "The so-called etymologies are basically only phonetic resemblances, which, moreover, according to the laws of a certain symbolism, effectively correspond to relationships between various ideas which have come to be grouped more or less as accessories around the word in question."

But, given the character of the Arabic language (a character which it shares with Hebrew) the primary and fundamental meaning a of word is to be found in the numerical values of the letters; and in fact, what is particularly remarkable is that the sum of the numerical values of the letters which form the word sūfi has the same number as al-Hikmatu'l-ilahiya, 'Divine Wisdom'. The true sūfi is therefore the one who possesses this Wisdom, or, in other words, he is al-'arif bi' Llah that is to say 'he who knows through God', for God cannot be known except by Himself, and this is the supreme or 'total' degree of knowledge or haqiqah.

Guénon then introduces the symbolism used in taṣawwuf about the numerical signification of Arabic letters:

The divine 'Throne' which surrounds all worlds (al-Arsh al-Muhit) is represented by the figure of a circle. In the center is ar-Rūh [the Spirit], and the 'Throne' is supported by eight angels positioned on the circumference, the first four at the four cardinal points and the other four at four intermediary points. The names of these angels are formed by various groups of letters arranged according to their numeric values in such a way that, taken together, the names comprise all the letters of the alphabet. The alphabet in question has 28 letters, but it is said that at the very beginning the Arabic alphabet had only 22 letters, corresponding exactly to those of the Hebrew alphabet; in doing so, the distinction is made between the lesser jafr, which uses only 22 letters, and the greater jafr, which uses 28 and conceives of them all with distinct numerical values. Moreover, it can be said that 28 (2 + 8 = 10) is contained in 22 (2 + 2 = 4) as 10 is contained in 4, according to Pythagorean Tetraktys: 1 + 2 + 3 + 4 = 10, and, in fact, the six supplementary letters are only modifications of the original six letters from which they are formed by a simple addition of a dot, and to which they are restored immediately by the suppression of this same dot.

ā/' ا	1	y/ī ي	10	q ق	100
b ب	2	k ك	20	r ر	200
j ج	3	l ل	30	sh ش	300
d د	4	m م	40	t ت	400
h ه	5	n ن	50	th ث	500
w/ū و	6	s س	60	kh خ	600
z ز	7	' ع	70	dh ذ	700
H ح	8	f ف	80	D ض	800
T ط	9	S ص	90	Z ظ	900
				gh غ	1000

It will be noticed that each of the two groups of four names contains exactly half of the alphabet, or 14 letters, which are distributed respectively in the following fashion (when considering the first four angels at cardinal points, and the second group of angels at intermediary points):

- In the first half: 4 + 3 + 3 + 4 = 14
- In the second half: 4 + 4 + 3 + 3 = 14

The numeric values of the eight names formed from the sum of those of their letters are, taking them naturally in order:

- 1 + 2 + 3 + 4 = 10
- 5 + 6 + 7 = 18
- 8 + 9 + 10 = 27
- 20 + 30 + 40 + 50 = 140
- 60 + 70 + 80 + 90 = 300
- 100 + 200 + 300 + 400 = 1000
- 500 + 600 + 700 = 1800
- 800 + 900 + 1000 = 2700

The values of the last three names are equal to those of the first three multiplied by 100, which is clear enough if one notices that the first three contain the numbers from 1 to 10, and the last three the hundred from 100 to 1000, both groups being equally distributed into 4 + 3 + 3.

The value of the first half of the alphabet is the sum of those of the first four names: 10 + 18 + 27 + 140 = 195. Similarly, that of the second half is the sum of the last four names: 300 + 1000 + 1800 + 2700 = 5800. Finally, the total value of the entire alphabet is 195 + 5800 = 5995.

"This number 5995 is remarkable for its symmetry: its central part is 99, the number of the 'attributes' of Allah; the outside numbers form 55, the sum of the first ten numbers, the denary being in turn divisible into two halves (5 + 5 = 10); besides, 5 + 5 = 10 and 9 + 9 = 18 is the numerical value of the first two names".

Connections with the general symbolism of al-Qutb al Ghawth [the Supreme Pole] are then contemplated.

=== Conditions of corporeal existence ===
The doctrine of five elements, which plays an important role in some Vedic texts, in Advaita Vedanta, Islamic esotericism, the Hebrew Kabbalah, in Christian Hermeticism, and other traditions, is partially exposed by René Guénon in two articles: one entitled The conditions of corporeal existence, published in 1912 in the journal La Gnose (Gnosis) (reprinted in the book Miscellanea) and another, published much later, in 1935: The Hindu doctrine of five elements (reprinted in the book Studies in Hinduism). A missing part of the first article was never published but René Guénon announced several times (The symbolism of the cross, The multiple states of the being) his intention to write a more complete study on this issue. Some aspects of the doctrine of five elements and conditions are used at many occurrences in all his work: in The symbolism of the cross, The principles of infinitesimal calculus, The Great Triad (on the vital condition), in the first two chapters of The Reign of Quantity and the Signs of the Times (on the notion of form) etc. However Guénon never wrote a comprehensive introduction to the subject, something that prompted comments from some authors.

Hellenic Physics philosophy

Four Classical Elements

Classical elements; ether (not present in Hellenic Physics), would be located at the centre: the other bhutas originate from it.

fire · earth · air · water

In these two articles, he exposits the doctrine of elements and "the conditions of corporeal existence", starting from the considerations taken from Samkhya of Kapila. The five elements or bhutas are the elementary substances of the corporeal world. The names given to them in the Latin language ("fire", "air", "water" etc.) are purely symbolic and they should not be confused with the things they designate: "we could consider the elements as different vibratory modalities of physical matter, modalities under which it makes itself perceptible successively (in purely logical succession, naturally) to each of the senses of our corporeal modality". The five bhutas are, in their order of production (which is the reverse of their order of resorption or return to the undifferentiated state):

1. âkâsha: ether,
2. vâyu: air,
3. têjas: fire,
4. ap: water,
5. prithvî, earth.

Due to the manifestation in our world of the duality "essence-substance", these five bhutas are in correspondence with five "elementary essences" "which are given the names tanmatras [...] signifying literally a 'measure' or an 'assignment' delimiting the proper domain of a certain quality or 'quiddity' in the universal Existence. [...] these tanmatras, by the very fact that they are of subtle order, are in no way perceptibles to the senses, unlike the corporeal elements and their combinations; they are only conceivable 'ideally'". These five essences are associated with the elementary sense qualities, as well as some organic faculties: auditive or sonorous quality shabda (शब्द), tangible sparśa (स्पर्श), visible rūpa (रूप) ("with the double meaning of form and color" ), sapid rasa (रस), olfactive gandha (गन्ध). There is a correspondence between the five elements and the five senses: to ether corresponds hearing (śrotra); to air, touch (tvak); to fire, sight (cakṣus); to water, taste (rasana); to earth, smell (ghrāṇa).

"Each bhuta, with the tanmatra to which it corresponds, and the faculties of sensation and action that proceed from the latter, is resorbed in the one immediately preceding it in the order of production in such a way that the order of resorption is as follows: first, earth (prithvî) with the olfactory quality (ghanda), the sense of smell (ghrāṇa), and the faculty of locomotion (pada); second, water (ap) with the sapid quality, the sense of taste (rasana), and the faculty of prehension (pani); third, fire (têjas) with the visual quality (rūpa), the sense of sight (cakṣus), and the faculty of excretion (payu); fourth, air (vâyu) with the tactile quality (sparśa), the sense of touch (tvak), and the faculty of generation (upashta); fifth, ether (âkâsha), with the sonorous quality (shabda), the sense of hearing (śrotra), and the faculty of speech (vach); and finally, at the last stage, the whole is resorbed in the 'inner sense' (manas)".

The five bhutas combine with the five conditions of corporeal existence which are:

1. space (linked to Vishnu in its expansion and "stabilisation" aspects),
2. time (linked to Shiva in its "transformation" aspect -'the current of forms'-),
3. matter (materia secunda i.e. quantity),
4. form,
5. life.

In the article "The conditions of corporeal existence" he develops, for the first two bhutas, how they are related to the measurement of time and space, and in "The Hindu theory of the five elements", the predominance of the three gunas or essential qualities coextensive with the universal manifestation in each of them serves to define the geometric representation of the "sphere of the elements".

=== Classical atomism and the continuum ===
'Naturalistic' tendencies never developed and took an extension in India as they did in Greece under the influence of physical philosophers. In particular, atomism (not in the modern sense of "atoms" and "elementary particles", but in the classical signification related to the existence of indivisible items from which the entire corporeal world is supposedly built) is a conception formally opposed to the Veda, notably in connection with the theory of five elements. Classical atomism states that "an atom, or anu, partakes, potentially at least, the nature of one or other of the elements, and it is from the grouping together of atoms of various kinds, under the action of a force said to be 'non perceptible' or adrishta that all bodies are supposed to be formed". The error of atomism comes from the fact that these atoms are supposed to exist within the corporeal order whereas all that is bodily is necessarily composite "being always divisible by the fact that it is extended, that is to say subject to the spatial condition" (although in the corporeal domain, divisibility has necessarily its limits).

in order to find something simple or indivisible it is necessary to pass outside space, and therefore outside that special modality of manifestation which constitutes corporeal existence.

Devanagari Aum

In its true sense of 'indivisible' writes Guénon, an atom, having no parts, must be without extension, and "the sum of elements devoid of extension can never form an extension", so that "atoms" cannot make up bodies. Guénon also reproduces an argument coming from Shankaracharya for the refutation of atomism:

two things can come into contact with one another either by a part of themselves or by the whole; for atoms, devoid as they are of parts, the first hypothesis is inadmissible; thus only the second hypothesis remains which amounts to saying that the aggregation of two atoms can only be realized by their coincidence [...] when it clearly follows that two atoms when joined occupy no more space than a single atom and so forth indefinitely.

The issue will be included in The principles of the infinitesimal calculus in relation to the concept of a whole understood as "logically prior to its parts" as well as in the conditions of corporeal existence and The symbolism of the cross. In that latter book, he speaks of "the elementary distance between two points" and in The principles of infinitesimal calculus he states that the ends of a segment are no longer in the domain of extension. Applied to the corporeal world, this leads to introduce the "limits of spatial possibility by which divisibility is conditioned" and to consider the "atoms" not in the corporeal world (which is properly the concept designated as classical atomism). The process of "quintuplication" of the elements being universal and coextensive to the whole manifestation, a universalization is contemplated in The conditions of corporeal existence:

"the point in itself is not contained in space and cannot in anyway be conditioned by it, because on the contrary it is the point that creates out of its own 'ipseity' redoubled or polarized into essence and substance, which amounts to saying that it contains space potentially. It is space that proceeds from the point, and not the point that is determined by space; but secondarily (all manifestation or exterior modification being only contingent and accidental in relation to its 'intimate nature'), the point determines itself in space in order to realize the actual extension of its potentialities of unlimited multiplication (of itself by itself) [...] [so that] extension already exists in the potential state in the point itself; it starts to exists in the actual state only when this point, in its first manifestation, is in a way doubled in order to stand face to face with itself, for one can then speak of the elementary distance between two points [...]. However one must point out that the elementary distance is only what corresponds to this doubling in the domain of spatial or geometric representation (which only has the character of symbol for us). Metaphysically, the point is considered to represent Being in its unity and its principal identity, that is to say Ātma outside of any special condition (or determination) and all differentiation; this point itself, its exteriorization [...] and the distance that joins them while at the same time separating them (a relationship that implies causality [...]) corresponds respectively to the three terms of the ternary that we have distinguished in Being considered as knowing itself (that is to say in Buddhi) [...], terms which [...] are perfectly identical among themselves, and which are designated Sat, Chit, and Ananda."

— The conditions of corporeal existence, in Miscellanea, pp. 97, 98.

In particular and in relation to these matters, The Reign of Quantity and the Signs of the Times develops against the theories of Descartes about the nature of time.

== Symbolism ==
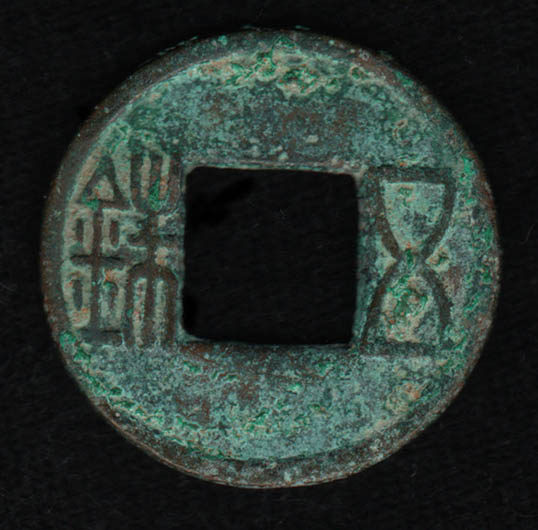
Han dynasty coin, with the square hole in the center, in application to analogy symbolism (see text)

While it is acknowledged that symbolism refers to something very different from a mere 'code', an artificial or arbitrary meaning, and that "it holds an essential and spontaneous echoing power", for René Guénon, this 'echoing power' goes immensely farther than the psychological realm: symbolism is "the metaphysical language at its highest", capable of relating all degrees of universal Manifestation, and all the components of the Being as well: symbolism is the means by which man is capable of "assenting" orders of reality that escape, by their very nature, any description by ordinary language. This understanding of the profound nature of symbolism, writes René Guénon, has never been lost by an intellectual (i.e. spiritual) elite in the East. It is inherent in the transmission of initiation which, he says, gives the real key to man to penetrate the deeper meaning of the symbols; in this perspective, meditation on symbols (visual or heard, dhikr, repetition of the Divine Names) is an integral part both of initiation and of spiritual realization.

=== Symbolism and analogy ===
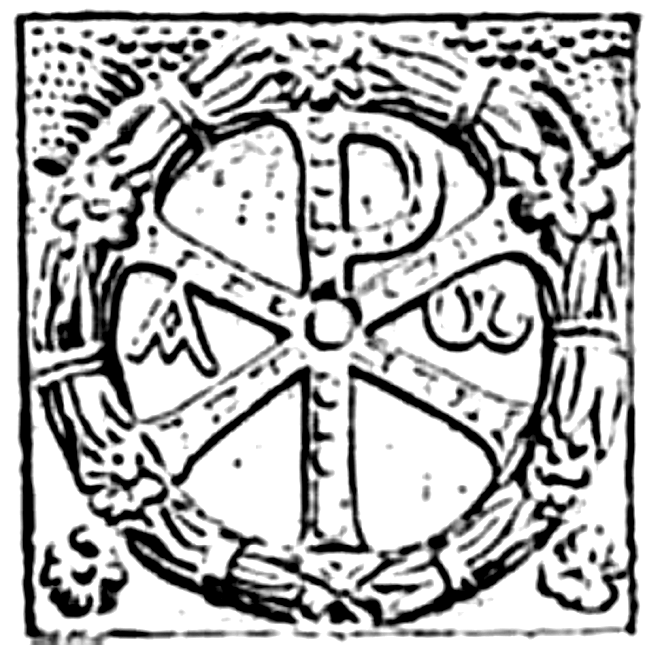
The Labarum, symbol based on the figure of chrism

For René Guénon art is above all knowledge and understanding, rather than merely a matter of sensitivity. Similarly, the symbolism has a conceptual vastness "not exclusive to a mathematical rigor": symbolism is before all a science, and it is based, in its most general signification on "connections that exist between different levels of reality ". And, in particular, the analogy itself, understood following a formula used in Hermeticism as the "relation of what is down with what is above" is likely to be symbolized: there are symbols of the analogy (but every symbol is not necessarily the expression of an analogy, because there are correspondences that are not analogical). The analogical relation essentially involves the consideration of an "inverse direction of its two terms", and symbols of the analogy, which are generally built on the consideration of the primitive six-spoke wheel, also called the chrism in the Christian iconography, indicate clearly the consideration of these "inverse directions"; in the symbol of the Solomon's seal, the two triangles in opposition represent two opposing ternaries, "one of which is like a reflection or mirror image the other" and "this is where this symbol is an exact representation of analogy".

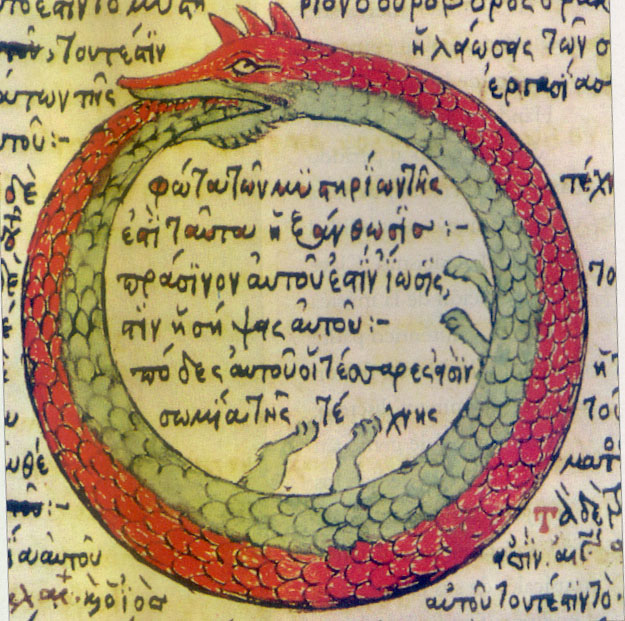
The circular snake of the Ouroboros is a symbol of Anima Mundi. Note the two colors associated with the dorsal and ventral parts of the snake. Drawing by Theodoros Pelecanos, dated 1478, from a treatise on alchemy entitled Synosius.

This consideration of a "reverse meaning" allows René Guénon to propose an explanation of some artistic depictions, such as that reported by Ananda Coomaraswamy in his study "The inverted tree": some images of the "World Tree", a symbol of universal Manifestation, represent the tree with its roots up and its branches down: the corresponding positions correspond to two complementary points of view that can be contemplated: point of view of the manifestation and of the Principle. This consideration of "reverse meaning" is one of the elements of a "science of symbolism" in which Guénon refers to, and used by him in many occasions. Thus, in his book The Great Triad, mainly dedicated to the explanation of some symbols belonging to Far Eastern tradition, the general symbols of Sky and Earth are linked, from the point of view of cyclical development, with the "sphere" and the "cube", while their meeting point is identified with the skyline because "it is on their periphery, or their most remote confines, that is to say, the horizon, that Sky and Earth are joining according to sensitive appearances"; the consideration of the "reverse meaning " surfaces here in the reality symbolized by these appearances because "following that reality, they unite on the contrary by the center". From there comes, according to Guénon, an explanation of the symbolism of the "ventral side" that Heaven presents to the "cosmos", and correspondingly of the "backbone" side shown by the Earth. This symbolism explains the shape of the ancient Chinese currency, which are drilled in the center by the figure of a square (see picture). Similarly, among the symbols of Anima Mundi, one of the most common is the snake, which is often figured in the circular shape of the Ouroboros:

"this form is appropriate for the animic principle inasmuch as it is on the side of essence with respect to the corporeal world; but of course it is on the contrary on the side of substance with respect of the spiritual world, so that, depending on the point of view from which it is considered, it can take the attributes of essence or of substance, which gives it so to speak the appearance of a double nature".

=== Symbolism and unity of traditional forms ===
The importance of symbolism in the works of René Guénon arises because symbolism is, in his own words, "the metaphysical language at its highest"; it may be used to link concepts with different formulations in different traditions. Among many other examples found in his works, symbolism is used in The Great Triad to connect the "Operation of the Holy Spirit" in the generation of Jesus Christ to the "non-acting" activity of Purusha or "Heaven", and Prakriti or the "Universal Substance" to Mary of Nazareth, Christ henceforth becoming identical, according to this symbolism, to the "Universal Man". His book The Symbolism of the Cross also connects the symbol of the Cross with the data of Islamic esotericism.

Guénon was critical of modern interpretations regarding symbolism which often rested on naturalistic interpretations of the symbol in question which Guénon regarded as a case of the symbol of the thing being mistaken for the thing itself. He was also critical of the psychological interpretations found in the likes of Carl Jung.

=== Symbolism and the primordial tradition ===
In the East, writes René Guénon, symbolism is above all a matter of knowledge. He therefore devotes a substantial number of writings in an exhibition of traditional symbols. Most of these articles have been collected by Michel Valsan in the posthumous work Fundamentals symbols of Sacred Science which proposes, in a remarkable synthesis, numerous keys aimed at interpreting a considerable number of symbols, especially prehistoric symbols of the "Center of the World", the Baetylus, the axial symbols, symbols of the heart, of cyclic manifestation etc. According to Guénon, the existence of identical symbols in different traditional forms, remote in time or space, would be a clue to a common intellectual and spiritual source whose origins dating back to the "primordial Tradition".

== Contemporary "neo-spiritualism" ==
Guénon denounced the Theosophical Society, many pseudo-Masonic orders in the French and English occult scenes and the Spiritist movement. They formed the topic of two of his major books written in the 1920s, Theosophy: History of a Pseudo-Religion and The Spiritist Fallacy. He denounced the syncretic tendencies of many of these groups, along with the common Eurocentric misconceptions that accompanied their attempts to interpret Eastern doctrines. René Guénon especially develops some aspects of what he refers to as the manifestation of "antitraditional" currents in the nineteenth and twentieth centuries. His first book on that subject is devoted to a detailed historical examination of Madame Blavatsky's theosophy: Theosophy: History of a Pseudo-Religion. Guénon examines the role and intervention that played in that movement organizations that are described in more detail in The Reign of Quantity and the Signs of the Times, as under what he called the "pseudo-initiation"; in particular what he calls "pseudo-Rosicrucian" organizations holding no affiliation with the real authentic Rosicrucians, like the Societas Rosicruciana in Anglia founded in 1867 by Robert Wentworth Little, the "Order of the esoteric Rose-Cross" of Dr. Franz Hartmann etc. He denounces the syncretic nature of theosophy and its connection with the theory of evolution in "The Secret Doctrine" (Madame Blavatsky's main work); he also examines the role and relationship that the Theosophical Society had with multitude of "pseudo-initiatic" organizations, among others the O.T.O. founded in 1895 by Carl Kellner and propagated in 1905 by Theodor Reuss, and the Golden Dawn, to which belongs a large number of key figures of the Anglo-Saxon "neo-spiritualism" of the early twentieth century etc. Some authors have argued that Guénon's analysis of Theosophy is flawed and that it is debatable whether Theosophy is really hostile to Islam and Christianity.

These are precisely some members of the "inner circle" of the H.B. of L., to which belonged Emma Hardinge Britten, who would have produced the phenomena giving rise to spiritist movement that is to say, another "antitraditional" current born in 1848. To support this assertion, he relies on statements from Emma Hardinge Britten herself, which will be confirmed much later, in 1985, by the publication from French publishing house Editions Archè of the documents of the H.B. of L. This organization would have received in part the legacy of other secret societies, including the "Eulis Brotherhood", to which belonged Paschal Beverly Randolph, a character designated by René Guénon as "very enigmatic" who died in 1875. He denounces "the confusion of the psychic and the spiritual" and especially the psychoanalytic interpretation of symbols, including the Jungian branch of it, which he condemned with the greatest firmness, seeing in it the beginnings of a reversed – or at least distorted – interpretation of symbols. This aspect is reflected in some studies, especially in a book published in 1999 by Richard Noll who incidentally speaks of the role played by the Theosophical Society in Jung.

A commentator of René Guénon, Charles-André Gilis, has published a book in 2009 which proposes some insights and developments of the idea of 'counter-tradition' introduced by Guénon, based on Mohyddin Ibn Arabi's writings ("The profanation of Israël in the light of Sacred Law").

== Bibliography ==
=== In English ===
- Introduction to the Study of the Hindu doctrines (Introduction générale à l'étude des doctrines hindoues, 1921)
- Theosophy: History of a Pseudo-Religion (Le Théosophisme – Histoire d'une pseudo-religion, 1921)
- The Spiritist Fallacy (L'erreur spirite, 1923)
- East and West (Orient et Occident, 1924)
- Man and his Becoming according to the Vedanta (L'homme et son devenir selon le Vêdânta, 1925)
- The Esoterism of Dante (L'ésotérisme de Dante, 1925)
- The King of the World (also published as Lord of the World, Le Roi du Monde, 1927)
- The Crisis of the Modern World (La crise du monde moderne, 1927)
- Spiritual Authority and Temporal Power (Authorité Spirituelle et Pouvoir Temporel, 1929)
- St. Bernard (Saint-Bernard, 1929)
- The Symbolism of the Cross (Le symbolisme de la croix, 1931)
- The Multiple States of the Being (Les états multiples de l'Être, 1932)
- Oriental Metaphysics (La metaphysique orientale, 1939)
- The Reign of Quantity and the Signs of the Times (Le règne de la quantité et les signes des temps, 1945)
- Perspectives on Initiation (Aperçus sur l'initiation, 1946)
- The Metaphysical Principles of the Infinitesimal Calculus (Les principes du calcul infinitésimal, 1946)
- The Great Triad (La Grande Triade, 1946)
- Initiation and Spiritual Realization (Initiation et réalisation spirituelle, 1952)
- Insights into Christian Esoterism (Aperçus sur l'ésotérisme chrétien, 1954)
- Symbols of Sacred Science (Symboles de la Science Sacrée, 1962)
- Studies in Freemasonry and Compagnonnage (Études sur la Franc-Maçonnerie et le Compagnonnage, 1964)
- Studies in Hinduism (Études sur l'Hindouisme, 1966)
- Traditional Forms and Cosmic Cycles (Formes traditionelles et cycles cosmiques, 1970)
- Insights into Islamic Esoterism and Taoism (Aperçus sur l'ésotérisme islamique et le Taoïsme, 1973)
- Reviews (Comptes rendus, 1973)
- Miscellanea (Mélanges, 1976)

==== Collected works ====
New English translation, 23 volumes, Sophia Perennis (publisher)

- East and West (paper, 2001; cloth, 2004)
- The Crisis of the Modern World (paper, 2001; cloth, 2004)
- The Esoterism of Dante (paper, 2003; cloth, 2005)
- The Great Triad (paper, 2001; cloth, 2004)
- Initiation and Spiritual Realization (paper, 2001; cloth, 2004)
- Insights into Christian Esoterism (paper, 2001; cloth, 2005)
- Insights into Islamic Esoterism and Taoism (paper, 2003; cloth, 2004)
- Introduction to the Study of the Hindu Doctrines (paper, 2001; cloth, 2004)
- The King of the World (paper, 2001; cloth, 2004)
- Man and His Becoming According to the Vedanta (paper, 2001; cloth, 2004)
- Metaphysical Principles of the Infinitesimal Calculus (paper, 2003; cloth, 2004)
- Miscellanea (paper, 2003; cloth, 2004)
- The Multiple States of the Being tr. Henry Fohr (paper, 2001; cloth, 2004)
- Perspectives on Initiation (paper, 2001; cloth, 2004)
- The Reign of Quantity and the Signs of the Times (paper, 2001; cloth, 2004)
- The Spiritist Fallacy (paper, 2003; cloth, 2004)
- Spiritual Authority and Temporal Power (paper, 2001; cloth, 2004)
- Studies in Freemasonry and the Compagnonnage (paper, 2005; cloth, 2005)
- Studies in Hinduism (paper, 2001; cloth, 2004)
- The Symbolism of the Cross (paper, 2001; cloth, 2004)
- Symbols of Sacred Science (paper, 2004; cloth, 2004)
- Theosophy, the History of a Pseudo-Religion (paper, 2003; cloth, 2004)
- Traditional Forms and Cosmic Cycles (paper, 2003; cloth, 2004)

=== In French ===
- Introduction générale à l'étude des doctrines hindoues, Paris, Marcel Rivière, 1921, many editions.
- Le Théosophisme, histoire d'une pseudo-religion, Paris, Nouvelle Librairie Nationale, 1921, many editions.
- L'Erreur spirite, Paris, Marcel Rivière, 1923, many editions including: Éditions Traditionnelles. ISBN 2-7138-0059-5.
- Orient et Occident, Paris, Payot, 1924, many editions, including: Guy Trédaniel/Éditions de la Maisnie, Paris. ISBN 2-85829-449-6.
- L'Homme et son devenir selon le Vêdânta, Paris, Bossard, 1925, many editions, including: Éditions Traditionnelles. ISBN 2-7138-0065-X.
- L'Ésotérisme de Dante, Paris, Ch. Bosse, 1925, many editions, including: Éditions Traditionnelles, 1949.
- Le Roi du Monde, Paris, Ch. Bosse, 1927, many editions, including: Gallimard, Paris. ISBN 2-07-023008-2.
- La Crise du monde moderne, Paris, Bossard, 1927, many editions, including: Gallimard, Paris. ISBN 2-07-023005-8.
- Autorité spirituelle et pouvoir temporel, Paris, Vrin, 1929, many editions, including: (1952) Guy Trédaniel/Éditions de la Maisnie, Paris. ISBN 2-85-707-142-6.
- Saint Bernard, Publiroc, 1929, re-edited: Éditions Traditionnelles. Without ISBN.
- Le Symbolisme de la Croix, Véga, 1931, many editions, including: Guy Trédaniel/Éditions de la Maisnie, Paris. ISBN 2-85-707-146-9.
- Les États multiples de l'Être, Véga, 1932, many editions, including: Guy Trédaniel/Éditions de la Maisnie, Paris. ISBN 2-85-707-143-4.
- La Métaphysique orientale, Editions traditionnelles, 1939, many editions. This is the written version of a conference given at The Sorbonne University in 1926.
- Le Règne de la Quantité et les Signes des Temps, Gallimard, 1945, many editions.
- Les Principes du Calcul infinitésimal, Gallimard, 1946, many editions.
- Aperçus sur l'Initiation, Éditions Traditionnelles, 1946, many editions.
- La Grande Triade, Gallimard, 1946, many editions.
- Aperçus sur l'ésotérisme chrétien, Éditions Traditionnelles (1954). ISBN (?).
- Aperçus sur l'ésotérisme islamique et le taoïsme, Gallimard, Paris,(1973). ISBN 2-07-028547-2.
- Comptes rendus, Éditions traditionnelles (1986). ISBN 2-7138-0061-7.
- Études sur l'Hindouisme, Éditions Traditionnelles, Paris (1967). ISBN (?).
- Études sur la Franc-maçonnerie et le Compagnonnage, Tome 1 (1964) Éditions Traditionnelles, Paris. ISBN 2-7138-0066-8.
- Études sur la Franc-maçonnerie et le Compagnonnage, Tome 2 (1965) Éditions Traditionnelles, Paris. ISBN 2-7138-0067-6.
- Formes traditionnelles et cycles cosmiques, Gallimard, Paris (1970). ISBN 2-07-027053-X.
- Initiation et Réalisation spirituelle, Éditions Traditionnelles, 1952. ISBN 978-2-7138-0058-0.
- Mélanges, Gallimard, Paris (1976). ISBN 2-07-072062-4.
- Symboles de la Science sacrée (1962), Gallimard, Paris. ISBN 2-07-029752-7.
- Articles et Comptes-Rendus, Tome 1, Éditions Traditionnelles (2002). ISBN 2-7138-0183-4.
- Recueil, Rose-Cross Books, Toronto (2013). ISBN 978-0-9865872-1-4.
- Fragments doctrinaux, doctrinal fragments from Guénon's correspondence (600 letters, 30 correspondents). Rose-Cross Books, Toronto (2013). ISBN 978-0-9865872-2-1.
- Paris-Le Caire, correspondence with Louis Cattiaux, Wavre, Le Miroir d'Isis, 2011. ISBN 978-2-917485-02-6.

== See also ==
- Nicolás Gómez Dávila
- José Ortega y Gasset
- Aristocracy
- Joseph de Maistre
- Traditionalist School
- Julius Evola
- Oswald Spengler

== Sources ==
- Accart, Xavier (2005). René Guénon ou le renversement des clartés: Influence d'un métaphysicien sur la vie littéraire et intellectuelle française (1920-1970). Paris: Archè EDIDIT.
- Bisson, David (2013). René Guénon, une politique de l'esprit. Paris: Pierre-Guillaume de Roux.
- Chacornac, Paul (2005). The Simple Life of René Guénon. Paris: Sophia Perennis. ISBN 1597310557.
- Chenique, Pierre (1985). "Cahiers de l'Herne": René Guénon : sous la direction de Jean-Pierre Laurant avec la collaboration de Paul Barba-Negra (ed.). Paris: Éditions de l'Herne.
- Frere, Jean-Claude (1970). Une Vie en Esprit, in Le Nouveau Planete, Rene Guenon: l'Homme et son Message. p. 12.
- Gilis, Charles-André (2001). Introduction à l'enseignement et au mystère de René Guénon. Paris: Editions Traditionnelles. ISBN 2713801796.
- Guénon, René (2001). The Symbolism of the Cross (4th revised ed.). Ghent, NY: Sophia Perennis.
- Guénon, René (2001b). Introduction to the Study of the Hindu Doctrines. Ghent, NY: Sophia Perennis. ISBN 9780900588730.
- Guénon, René (2004a). Man and his Becoming according to Vêdânta. Ghent, NY: Sophia Perennis. p. foreword.
- Guénon, René (2004b). The Reign of Quantity and the Signs of the Times. Ghent, NY: Sophia Perennis. ISBN 0900588675.
- Ingram, Brannon (2007). "René Guénon and the Traditionalist Polemic". In Hammer, Olav; Von Stuckrad, Kocku (eds.). Polemical Encounters: Esoteric Discourse and Its Others. Leiden: Brill. pp. 201–226.
- Laurant, Jean-Pierre (2006). René Guénon, Les enjeux d'une lecture. Dervy Livres.
- Ifversen, Jan (2002). "The crisis of European civilization: an inter-war diagnosis". In Mozaffari, Mehdi (ed.). Globalization and Civilizations. Routledge. pp. 151–177.
- Laurant, Jean-Pierre (1985). " Cahiers de l'Herne " : René Guénon : sous la direction de Jean-Pierre Laurant avec la collaboration de Paul Barba-Negra (ed.). Paris: Éditions de l'Herne.
- Sedgwick, Mark (2016). Alexander Magee, Glenn (ed.). The Cambridge Handbook of Western Mysticism and Esotericism. Cambridge: Cambridge University Press.
- Vivenza, Jean (2002). Le Dictionnaire de René Guénon. Grenoble: Le Mercure Dauphinois.
- Vivenza, Jean (2004). La Métaphysique de René Guénon. Grenoble: Le Mercure Dauphinois.
