= Dictionnaire du monde religieux dans la France contemporaine =

Series of French reference books

- Edited by: Jean-Marie Mayeur; Yves-Marie Hilaire
- Country: France
- Language: French
- Discipline: Religious studies
- Publisher: Éditions Beauchesne
- Media type: Print
- No. of books: 12
- OCLC: 13668990

Dictionnaire du monde religieux dans la France contemporaine is a French series of reference books about religion in France. Starting in 1985, it has had twelve volumes. The series has received a positive academic reception.

== Content ==
Each volume covers a certain area, group, or concept relating to France. It includes several "regional" volumes which focus on religion in specific places in France. The individual books contain introductions prior to the individual entries on people which give wider context and history on the topic as a whole.

== Publication history ==
The series is published by Éditions Beauchesne. Jean-Marie Mayeur and Yves-Marie Hilaire were the series editors.

The first volume in the series, Les Jésuites de 1802 (Concordat) à 1962 (Vatican II), was published in 1985. From 2001 to 2013 the series was paused and there were no volumes published, but in 2013 an eleventh volume was released on the diocese of Arras. In 2016, a twelfth book, Franche-Comté, was released.

== Volumes ==
1. Duclos, Paul, ed. (1985). Les Jésuites (in French). ISBN 978-2-7010-1065-6.
2. Vogler, Bernard, ed. (1987). L'Alsace (in French). ISBN 978-2-7010-1141-7.
3. Lagrée, Michel, ed. (1990). La Bretagne (in French). ISBN 978-2-7010-1202-5.
4. Caudron, André, ed. (1996). Lille-Flandres (in French). ISBN 978-2-7010-1220-9.
5. Encrevé, André, ed. (1993). Les Protestants (in French). ISBN 978-2-7010-1261-2.
6. de Montclos, Xavier, ed. (1994). Lyon, Le Lyonnais, Le Beaujolais (in French). ISBN 978-2-7010-1305-3.
7. Pérouas, Louis, ed. (1994). Le Limousin (in French). ISBN 978-2-7010-1366-4.
8. Sorrel, Christian, ed. (1996). La Savoie (in French). ISBN 978-2-7010-1330-5.
9. Laplanch, François, ed. (1996). Les Sciences religieuses (in French). ISBN 978-2-7010-1341-1.
10. Chantin, Jean-Pierre, ed. (2001). Les Marges du christianisme: « Sectes », dissidences, ésotérisme (in French). ISBN 978-2-7010-1418-0.
11. Boniface, Xavier; Hilaire, Yves-Marie; Cassan, Audrey; Beirnaert, Michel, eds. (2013). Arras, Artois-Côte d'Opale (in French). ISBN 978-2-7010-1994-9.
12. Ducerf, Laurent; Petit, Vincent; Tramaux, Manuel, eds. (2016). Franche-Comté (in French). ISBN 978-2-7010-2063-1.

== Reception ==
Paul Misner, writing for The Catholic Historical Review, praised the series as a whole as being "perhaps the most valuable of the undertakings" of GRECO (the Groupement de recherches coordonnées of the CNRS). He described the series' first and fourth volumes as "brimming with details" about many social Catholic figures. Maurilio Guasco complimented the books as an "indepensible tool" for learning about French religious history, noting its inclusion of less well known figures and the series' introductions. Historian Étienne Fouilloux praised the series' "usefulness" as a source on French Christianity.
