= Bernard Blandre =

French secondary history teacher

Bernard Blandre is a French secondary history teacher (retired). He is the President and one of the founders of the Association of Study and Information on Religious Movements (Association d'Étude et d'Information sur les Mouvements Religieux or AEIMR), a nonprofit organization established in Sarreguemines whose purpose is to gather documentation on small religious movements, to provide researchers with material on the subject of "cults". Blandre published two books and other studies on the Jehovah's Witnesses and wrote articles on other religious groups including Adventism and the Latter-day Saint movement. Journal La Vie considered him "one of the best specialists" of Jehovah's Witnesses. On the other hand, Jean-Pierre Chantin deplores the lack of analysis, and states that a synthesis is still expected.

== Selective works ==
Books

- Les Témoins de Jéhovah, un siècle d'histoire, Éditions Desclée de Brouwer, 1987 (ISBN 9782220026404)
- Les Témoins de Jéhovah, Éditions Brepols, 1991 (ISBN 9782503500645)

Brochures

- "Attentes et débats 1873-1919 — Aux origines des Étudiants de la Bible et des Témoins de Jéhovah", AEIMR, Cahier 1988, March–May, n° 95—97
- "Les débuts de l'Adventisme", AEIMR, Cahier 1989, March–April, n° 107-108
- "Les Recherches généalogiques des Mormons", AEIMR, Cahier 1990, April–May, n° 120-121
- "L'Église Adventiste du Septième Jour - 1844-1920", AEIMR, Cahier 1991, May–June, n° 133-134
- "Les Témoins de Jéhovah", AEIMR, Cahier 1995, May–June, n° 181-182

Selective articles

- "Russell, Barbour et le retour de Jésus en 1874", Revue de l'histoire des religions, 1979, vol. 195, n°1, pp. 55–67
- "Le Jour de Jéhovah. La crise économique de 1873 et la relance du millénarisme par Russell", Revue de l'histoire des religions, 1980, vol. 197, n°2, pp. 191–200
- "La première brochure de Russell", Revue de l'histoire des religions, 1982, vol. 199, n°4, pp. 405–15
- "Russell et le blé miraculeux", Revue de l'histoire des religions, 1988, vol. 205, n°2, pp. 181–93
