= The Reign of Quantity and the Signs of the Times =

1945 book by René Guénon

- Cover of the first edition
- Author: René Guénon
- Original title: Le Règne de la quantité et les signes des temps
- Translator: 1953: Lord Northbourne
- Language: French
- Subjects: Materialism, civilization, scientism, Idea of Progress
- Published: 1945 (in French); 1953: Luzac; 1972: Penguin Metaphysical Library; 2001: Sophia Perennis
- Publication place: France
- Pages: 363 (Penguin); 284 (Sophia Perennis)
- ISBN: 0-900588-67-5 (paperback edition); ISBN 0-900588-68-3 (hardcover edition)
- Text: The Reign of Quantity and the Signs of the Times at Internet Archive

The Reign of Quantity and the Signs of the Times (French: Le Règne de la Quantité et les Signes des Temps) is a 1945 book by the French intellectual René Guénon, in which the author offers a comprehensive explanation, based on tradition, of the cyclical conditions that led to the modern world in general and to the Second World War in particular.

The book was published in 1945 with help from Jean Paulhan of Gallimard, who created a collection dedicated to the theme of tradition in order to publish Guénon.

== Reception ==
Jacob Needleman, in The Sword of Gnosis, writes:

"Many of Guénon's books, notably The Reign of Quantity, are such potent and detailed metaphysical attacks on the downward drift of Western civilisation as to make all other contemporary critiques seem half-hearted by comparison."

Harry Oldmeadow, author of Traditionalism: Religion in the Light of the Perennial Philosophy:

"The Reign of Quantity is a brilliantly sustained and excoriating attack on modern civilisation [...] The book is a controlled and dispassionate but devastating razing of the assumptions and values of modern science. At the same time it is an affirmation of the metaphysical and cosmological principles given expression in traditional culture and religions."

== Translations ==
There are complete translations of Le règne de la quantité in a number of languages: English, Romanian, Italian, Spanish, Portuguese, Swedish, Persian, and Turkish. Walter James, 4th Baron Northbourne being among the translators for the 1953 English version.

== See also ==
- Cartesianism
- List of French philosophers
- Modernity
- Perennial philosophy
- Scientism
- Traditionalist School
