= Archives de sciences sociales des religions =

Academic journal on religious studies

- Cover of the 192nd issue
- Discipline: Religious studies
- Language: French, English, Spanish

Publication details
- Former name: Archives de sociologie des religions
- History: 1956–present
- Publisher: Éditions de l'EHESS (France)
- Frequency: Quarterly
- Open access: Yes

Standard abbreviations
- ISO 4: Arch. sci. soc. relig.

Indexing
- ISSN: 0335-5985 (print); 1777-5825 (web)
- LCCN: 74645706
- JSTOR: 03355985
- OCLC no.: 224153374

Links
- Journal homepage

Archives de sciences sociales des religions (ASSR), known as the Archives de sociologie des religions pre-1973, is a quarterly peer-reviewed open access academic journal focused on religious studies. It is published by the Éditions de l'EHESS.

== History ==
The journal was established in 1956 under the French National Centre for Scientific Research as the Archives de Sociologie des Religions. It was renamed as the Archives de sciences sociales des religions in 1973. It was founded by a group of five intellectuals: Henri Desroche, Émile Poulat, Jacques Maître, François-André Isambert and Gabriel Le Bras.

Desroche was the editor-in-chief until 1980. The journal releases articles bilingually in French and English, and occasionally in Spanish. Émile Poulat was one of the most important contributors of the journal, and was a member of its editorial board.

The journal originally appeared semi-annually, and was published by the Institut de Sciences sociales des Religions in Paris, France. The journal was transitioned to a diamond open access model in 2023, available for free on OpenEdition Journals. In 2015 it had 1,000 readers.

== Editorial processes ==
The journal is peer-reviewed. It publishes a "bibliographic bulletin" in January, and thematic or variety issues in April, June and November. It has published themed issues on the religion of Creole peoples and the relations between Islam and politics in post-communist countries.

== Influence ==
Writer David Martin described the journal, along with the journal Social Compass, as "as essential to theory-building [in the context of the sociology of religion] as missionary ethnographies were to the foundations of anthropology". Lionel Obadia described it as "the major journal in social sciences of religion in France".
