= Jean-Pierre Chantin =

French historian of religion (born 1961)

- Born: 1961 (age 64–65); France
- Occupations: Historian, author

Academic background
- Education: Jean Moulin University Lyon 3

Academic work
- Discipline: Historian
- Sub-discipline: Religious history, Academic study of new religious movements

Jean-Pierre Chantin (born 1961) is a French historian of religion and author, associated with the University of Lyon. He specializes in the history of religion in France, including the Catholic Church and the role of new religious movements. He has published and edited several books on the topic of religion and NRMs.

== Early life and education ==
He gained his PhD from the University of Lyon III in 1994.

== Works ==
He specialized in the history of religion in France, including the Catholic Church and the role of new religious movements.

In 1998 his study of Jansenism was published by the University of Lyon. In 2001 he was the chief editor of the Dictionnaire du monde religieux dans la France contemporaine 2001 volume, Les Marges du christianisme, published by Éditions Beauchesne. In 2004 he published a 157-page study on French sects from 1905 to 2000, asking: "disputes or religious innovations?" and in 2010 about "The French certified diet", Editions Beauchesne (director of collection Bibliothèque Beauchesne).

== Bibliography ==
- —— (1996). Le jansénisme: entre hérésie imaginaire et résistance catholique (XVIIe - XIXe siècle). Bref (in French). Paris: Cerf. ISBN 978-2-204-05366-2.
- —— (1998). Les amis de l'oeuvre de la Vérité: jansénisme, miracles et fin du monde au XIXe siècle (in French). Lyon: Presses de l'Université de Lyon. ISBN 978-2-7297-0598-5.
- ——, ed. (2001). Les marges du Christianisme: "Sectes", dissidences, ésotérisme. Dictionnaire du monde religieux dans la France contemporaine (in French). Paris: Éditions Beauchesne. ISBN 978-2-7010-1418-0.
- —— (2004). Des "sectes" dans la France contemporaine: 1905-2000, contestations ou innovations religieuses?. La Collection "Hommes et communautés" (in French). Toulouse: Privat : Diffusion Sofédis. ISBN 978-2-7089-6855-4.
- ——; Moulinet, Daniel (2005). La séparation de 1905: les hommes et le lieux (in French). Editions de l'Atelier. ISBN 978-2-7082-3786-5.
- —— (2010). Le régime concordataire français: la collaboration des Églises et de l'État 1802-1905. Bibliothèque Beauchesne (in French). Paris: Beauchesne. ISBN 978-2-7010-1563-7.
- —— (2022). La Famille - Une dissidence catholique au cœur de Paris, XVIIe-XXIe siècle (in French). Plein Jour. ISBN 978-2-37067-082-3.
