= Xavier de Montclos =

French historian (1924–2018)

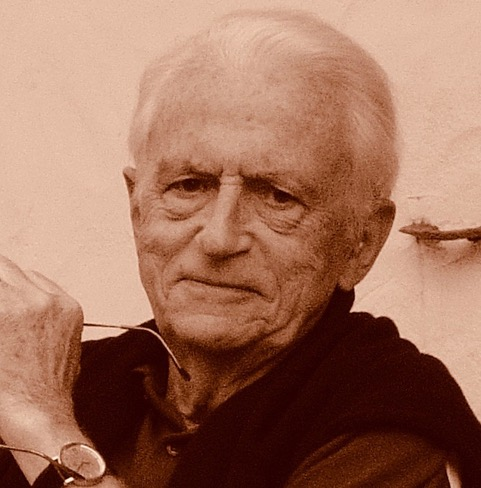
Xavier de Montclos

Xavier de Montclos (30 August 1924 – 21 September 2018) was a 20th–21st-century French historian, a specialist of the history of religions and particularly Christianity.

== Career ==
In 1965, he defended his thesis devoted to Lavigerie, le Saint-Siège et l'Église, de l'avènement de Pie IX à l'avènement de Léon XIII, 1846-1978. In 1966, he supported a complementary thesis on Le toast d'Alger, documents, 1890-1891.

He is emeritus professor at the Lumière University Lyon 2.

With Jean-Marie Mayeur and Yves-Marie Hilaire, he directed the publication of the Dictionnaire du monde religieux dans la France contemporaine. He also collaborated to the making of the Encyclopædia Universalis by writing two articles about Charles Martial Lavigerie and the Ralliement.

In 1967, Xavier de Montclos was awarded the Prix Broquette-Gonin in literature for his Le Toast d’Alger (1890-1891).

== Works ==
- Histoire religieuse de la France, Paris, Presses universitaires de France, 1988
- de Montclos, Xavier (1991). Les chrétiens face au nazisme et au stalinisme; l'épreuve totalitaire : 1939-1945 (in French). Paris: Éditions Complexe. ISBN 9782870274071. OCLC 716364799..
- de Montclos, Xavier (1998). Réformer l'Église; Histoire du réformisme catholique en France de la Révolution jusqu'à nos jours (in French). Paris: Éditions du Cerf. ISBN 978-2204058537..
- Brève histoire de l'Église de France, Paris, Éditions du Cerf, 2002
- L'ancienne bourgeoisie en France du XVIe au XXe siècle, Paris, Christian, 2005
