= Émile Poulat =

French historian, sociologist and former priest

Émile Poulat (French: [pula]; June 13, 1920 – November 22, 2014) was until 1954 a Catholic priest, associated with the Prêtres Ouvriers movement, and thereafter a French historian and sociologist. Director of Studies at the École des hautes études en sciences sociales, he was also director of research at CNRS and historian of the contemporary church.

He was a founding member of the Group of Sociology of Religion, director and member of the editorial boards of several journals including Politica Hermetica. His research concentrated on the conflict between Catholic and modern culture in the history of contemporary Catholicism.

== Main works ==
- Études sur la tradition française de l'Association ouvrière, Éditions de Minuit, 1955.
- Les cahiers manuscrits de Fourier, Minuit, 1957.
- Priests and Workers, An Anglo-French Discussion, SCM Press, 1961.
- Le journal d'un prêtre d'après-demain (1902–1903) de l'Abbé Calippe, Casterman, 1961.
- Histoire, dogme et critique de la crise moderniste, Casterman, 1962, 1979; Albin Michel, 1996.
- Naissance des prêtres ouvriers, Casterman, 1965.
- Intégrisme et catholicisme intégral, Casterman, 1969.
- Les "semences religieuses", Université Lyon-II, 1973.
- Catholicisme, démocratie et socialisme, Casterman, 1977.
- Une Eglise ébranlée (1939–1978), Casterman, 1980.
- Modernistica. Horizons, physionomies, débats, Nouvelles Editions Latines, 1982.
- Le catholicisme sous observation, entretiens avec Guy Lafon, series Les Interviews, Paris, Éditions du Centurion, 1983.
- Ère post-chrétienne, Paris, Flammarion, 1994.
- Histoire dogme et critique dans la crise moderniste. Suivi de La réflexion d'Alphonse Dupront, 1962, Albin Michel, 1996.
- Henri Desroche, un passeur de frontières, with Claude Ravelet, L'Harmattan, 1997.
- La solution laïque et ses problèmes, Berg International, 1997.
- Henri Desroche un passeur de frontière, L'Harmattan, 1997.
- Les Prêtres-Ouvriers, Paris, Le Cerf editions, 1999.
- L'université devant la mystique, Salvator, 1999.
- Deus ex-machina, L'Âge d'Homme, 2002.
- Notre laïcité publique, Berg international, 2003.
- Le christianisme à contre-histoire, with Dominique Decherf, Éditions du Rocher, 2003.
- Les discriminations religieuses en France, with Dominique Kounkou, Chrétiens Autrement, 2004.
- La question religieuse et ses turbulences, Paris, Berg international, 2005.
- (dir.) 1905-2005. Les enjeux de la laïcité, with Alain Bondeelle, Jean Boussinesq, Alain Boyer, Driss El Yazami, Alain Gresh, Michel Morineau, Émile Poulat, Tariq Ramadan, Joël Roman, Michel Tubiana, L'Harmattan, 2005.
- Église contre bourgeoisie, Paris, Berg International, 2006.
- L'Antimaçonnisme catholique, with Jean-Pierre Laurant, Paris, Berg international, 2006.
- La Séparation et les églises de l'Ouest, L'Harmattan, 2006.
- Les diocésaines, la Documentation française, 2007.
- France chrétienne, France laïque, with Danièle Masson, Desclée de Brouwer, 2008.
- Aux carrefours statégiques de l'Église de France, Berg International, 2009.
- Scruter la loi de 1905, la République française et la Religion, Fayard, 2010
