= Jean-Pierre Laurant =

French historian

Jean-Pierre Laurant (born 1935) is a French historian of esotericism.

== Biography ==
Laurant was born in 1935 in Paris and studied at the Lycée Claude Bernard. Two major early influences were Julien Gracq and Jean-René Huguenin, in whose weekly Arts Laurant published.

After studying history at the Sorbonne, Laurant taught at the lycée in Soissons, Picardy. He was elected mayor of the commune of Vézaponin (population 109-129 persons), near Soissons.

In 1975, he started to give pioneering courses on nineteenth- and twentieth-century esotericism at the Ecole pratique des hautes études.

Laurant was a founder and director of Politica hermetica, an influential association for the study of the social influence of esoteric thought that published a journal of the same name.

In 1990, he received the degree of docteur ès lettres from the University of Paris XII.

== Select bibliography ==
- L'ésotérisme chrétien en France au XIXe siècle ISBN 2-8251-0330-6
- Matgioi, un aventurier taoïste ISBN 2-85076-151-6
- René Guénon ISBN 2-85197-055-0
- L'Ésotérisme ISBN 2-204-04850-X
- René Guénon: Les enjeux d'une lecture (2006) ISBN 2-84454-423-1
- L'Antimaçonnisme catholique, with Émile Poulat, Paris, Berg international, 2006
