= Henri Desroche =

French sociologist (1914–1994)

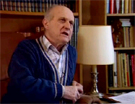
Henri Desroche, 1990.

Henri Desroche (French pronunciation: [ɑ̃.ʁi deʁɔʃ]; 12 April 1914 – 1 June 1994) was a French priest and sociologist. His writings center on the sociology of religion and cooperative systems and movements. He was a priest in the Dominican Order.

== Life ==
Henri Desroche was born 12 April 1914 in Roanne, France. He attended the Collège Saint-Pierre of Villemontais before entering the seminary in the diocese of Lyon. He joined the Dominicans in Angers in October 1934. There he took the name of Henri-Charles and added the "s" to his name, becoming Henri-Charles Desroches. He completed his theological studies in Chambéry and was ordained a priest in Annecy in July 1936. On September 30, 1977, Desroche received an honorary doctorate from the Faculty of Theology at Uppsala University, Sweden.

== Works by Desroche ==
- The American Shakers: From Neo-Christianity to Presocialism (1971)
- Jacob and the Angel: An Essay in Sociologies of Religion (1973) (Trans. of Sociologies religieuses [1968])
- The Sociology of Hope (1979)
