= Langdon =

Langdon may refer to:

== Places ==
=== Australia ===
- Langdon, Queensland, a neighbourhood in the Mackay Region

=== Canada ===
- Langdon, Alberta, a hamlet

=== United Kingdom ===
- Langdon, Cornwall, a hamlet
- Langdon, Kent, a civil parish
- Langdon, Pembrokeshire

=== United States ===
- Langdon, Iowa, an unincorporated community
- Langdon, Kansas, a city
- Langdon, a village which later became part of Cottage Grove, Minnesota
- Langdon, New Hampshire, a town
- Langdon, North Dakota, a city
- Langdon, Washington, D.C., a neighborhood
- Langdon, Minnesota, a former settlement
- Lake Langdon, Minnesota
- Langdon Lake, Oregon

== As a name ==
- Langdon (surname), various people
- Langdon (given name), various people

== Other uses ==
- Langdon Abbey, West Langdon, Kent, England
- Langdon Academy, a co-educational all-through school in the London Borough of Newham, England
- Langdon Hall, Auburn University, Auburn, Alabama, United States

== See also ==
- East Langdon, Kent
- West Langdon, Kent
- Langdon Bay (Kent)
- Langdon Court, Devon, a former manor house
- Langdon Hills, Essex
- Landon, a variant spelling
