= Walter James =

Walter James may also refer to:

- Walter James (actor) (1882–1946), American film actor
- Walter James (Australian politician) (1863–1943), Australian politician and the fifth Premier of Western Australia
- Walter James, 1st Baron Northbourne (1816–1893), British peer and Tory Member of Parliament
- Walter James, 2nd Baron Northbourne (1846–1923), British peer and Liberal Member of Parliament
- Walter James, 3rd Baron Northbourne, English painter, etcher, and hereditary peer
- Walter James, 4th Baron Northbourne (1896–1982), British peer, agriculturalist, Olympic rower and Traditionalist author
- Arthur Walter James (1912–2015), British journalist and politician
- Walter James, a character in Dirty Work, a 1988 novel by Larry Brown
