= Langdon Bay (Kent) =

Bay in Kent, England

Coordinates: 51°08′01″N 1°21′04″E

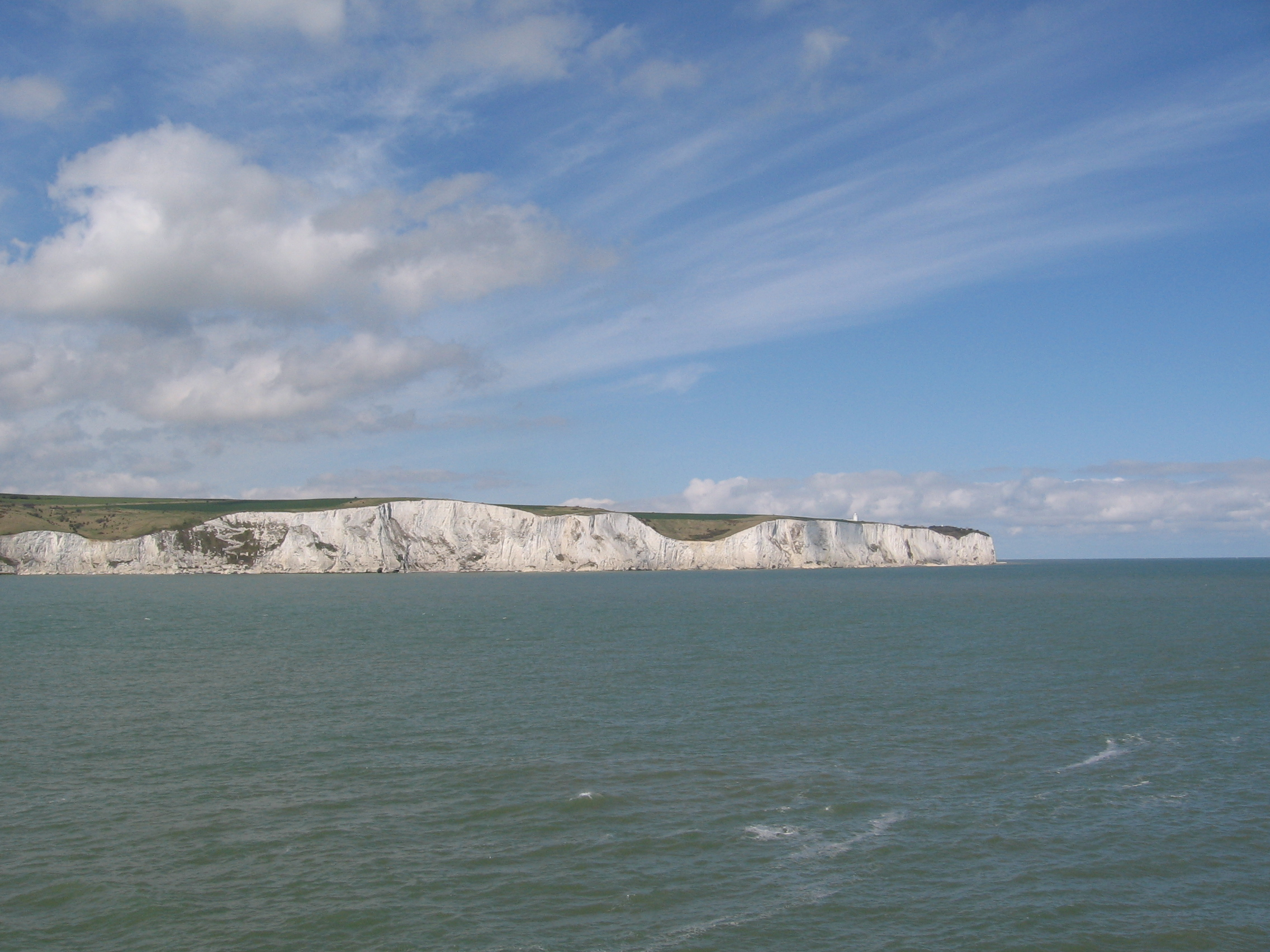
Langdon Cliffs to South Foreland Lighthouse

Langdon Bay is a bay in east Kent, England. It is two miles east of the town of Dover, and is named after the nearby villages of Langdon, East Langdon and West Langdon. The cliffs around it are known as the Langdon Cliffs. A prominent zig-zag path down the cliff-face is visible from the sea and connects with the National Trust path by means of a step ladder. An additional means of exit from the beach being a return on foot to St Margaret's Bay. At the far western end is a restricted area of the Port of Dover, and occasionally walkers will be escorted out by the Dover Port Police.

== History ==
The bay is known for the Langdon Bay Hoard – a collection of Bronze Age metal objects found nearby in 1974. This includes bronze axes of a French type and is thought to represent the cargo of a boat that was caught in a storm just after leaving the English coast, either jettisoned to lighten and save the boat or sunk with it (if there was a wreck, it is now lost). This demonstrates that cross-channel trade was already occurring in the Bronze Age, if not earlier. The hoard is owned by the British Museum, but is on long-term loan and display in Dover Museum in Market Square, Dover.

Three searchlight batteries – known as the Langdon Lights – were built into the base of the bay's cliffs during World War II, so that any ship trying to enter the bay could be illuminated while it was checked, though one battery has since been destroyed by a cliff fall.

The area above the cliffs is now a chalk downland nature reserve owned by the National Trust, looking down on Dover Harbour and the Channel, and centred on the 'Gateway to the White Cliffs' Visitor Centre. Large parts of this reserve, and of this section of clifftop in general, is an SSSI, AONB and Heritage Coast. Another nearby historic site is the South Foreland Lighthouse, also a NT property.

There is also a shipwreck there called the SS Falcon which Is still there to this day after it set fire and ran aground on Langdon Bay on the 25th-26th October 1926, all the sailors on the ship were saved by the tug boat Lady Brassy.

Another ship that ran aground was the 5 sail cargo ship called Preussen, it ran aground in Langdon bay on the 5th November 1910 at 11:35pm after a terrible storm. It was famously holding lots of pianos when it sank, sadly you can't see what remains of the ship after it was dismantled and the rest got swept up by the English Channel.
