= 1940 East Langdon Messerschmitt Bf 109 crash =

1940 crash-landing in Kent, England

- Part of the Battle of Britain
Date	24 August 1940
Location	Solton Manor, Solton Lane, East Langdon, Kent, England
Result	Aircraft shot down; pilot captured

Belligerents
United Kingdom Royal Air Force	Nazi Germany Luftwaffe

Commanders and leaders
Sgt Antoni Głowacki (No. 501 Squadron RAF)	Uffz. Fritz Beeck (6./JG 51)

Units involved
No. 501 Squadron RAF	6./Jagdgeschwader 51

Strength
1 Hawker Hurricane	1 Messerschmitt Bf 109

Casualties and losses
None	1 aircraft lost; pilot captured

The Crash landing of Messerschmitt at Solton Manor, Solton Lane, East Langdon, Kent, was a forced landing of a Messerschmitt Bf 109E‑4 of 6./Jagdgeschwader 51 on 24 August 1940 during the Battle of Britain. The aircraft, flown by Unteroffizier Fritz Beeck, was shot down during air combat associated with the Kampfgeschwader 76 raid on RAF Manston and force‑landed close to Solton Manor and the A258. Beeck survived and was taken prisoner.

== Background ==
During the early phase of the Battle of Britain, the Luftwaffe carried out sustained operations against airfields and military infrastructure across Kent. On 24 August 1940, elements of Kampfgeschwader 76 launched a raid on RAF Manston, supported by fighter units from Jagdgeschwader 51.

== Crash ==
The aircraft involved was a Messerschmitt Bf 109E‑4 (Werknummer 5587) of 6./JG 51.

Beeck's aircraft was shot down by Sergeant Antoni Głowacki of No. 501 Squadron RAF, flying from RAF Hawkinge.

Beeck made a forced landing in his damaged aircraft near East Langdon, close to Solton Manor and the A258. The Kent Historic Environment Record describes the location only generally as “beside the A258 near East Langdon”, and does not record a precise crash point.

Beeck survived the forced landing and was captured shortly afterwards by local residents. The aircraft came down on farmland worked by John Weir of Solton Manor, where a series of photographs were taken soon after the crash. One widely reproduced image shows the Weirs’ daughter, Jean Weir, seated in the cockpit of the downed aircraft; the photograph was taken by her mother, Ethel Weir.

== Bibliography ==
- Franks, Norman; Shores, Christopher (1996). Fighter Command Losses of the Second World War, Vol. 1: Operational Losses, Aircraft and Crews 1939–1941. Leicester: Midland Publishing. ISBN 9781857800135.
- Hough, Richard; Richards, Denis (1989). The Battle of Britain: The Jubilee History. London: Hodder & Stoughton. ISBN 978-0340534700.
- Kent County Council. "Kent Historic Environment Record: TR 34 NW 326". Retrieved 10 August 2026.
- St Margaret's History Society. "Jean Weir and a Downed Messerschmitt 109, August 1940". Retrieved 10 August 2026.
- Kent Battle of Britain Museum. East Langdon Bf 109 Crash – Photographic Archive. Hawkinge. Retrieved 10 August 2026.
