= Listed buildings in Langdon, Kent =

Historic buildings in Kent, England

Langdon is a village and civil parish in the Dover District of Kent, England. It contains 14 listed buildings that are recorded in the National Heritage List for England. Of these four grade II* and ten are grade II.

This list is based on the information retrieved online from Historic England.

== Key ==
| Grade | Criteria |
|---|---|
| I | Buildings that are of exceptional interest |
| II* | Particularly important buildings of more than special interest |
| II | Buildings that are of special interest |

== Listing ==
| Name | Grade | Location | Type | Completed (Note: The date given is the date used by Historic England as significant for the initial building or that of an important part in the structure's description.) | Date designated | Grid ref. (Note: The grid reference is based on the British national grid reference system, sometimes known as OSGB36, used by the Ordnance Survey.) Geo-coordinates | Notes | Entry number (Note: The "List Entry Number" is a unique number assigned to each listed building and scheduled monument by Historic England.) | Image | Wikidata |
|---|---|---|---|---|---|---|---|---|---|---|
| Barn About 20 Metres North East of Jossenblock | II* | East Langdon | | | 23 April 1987 | TR3338646179; 51°10′02″N 1°20′13″E | | 1070052 | Upload Photo | Q17557653 |
| Chest Tomb About 5 Metres North West of Church of St Augustine | II | East Langdon | | | 23 April 1987 | TR3329745991; 51°09′56″N 1°20′08″E | | 1363360 | Upload Photo | Q26645191 |
| Church Farm House and Wall Attached | II | East Langdon | | | 22 August 1966 | TR3332146022; 51°09′57″N 1°20′09″E | | 1336992 | Upload Photo | Q26621449 |
| Church of St Augustine | II* | East Langdon | church building | | 23 April 1987 | TR3331045980; 51°09′56″N 1°20′09″E | | 1070054 | Church of St Augustine More images | Q17557661 |
| Eastside Farmhouse | II | East Langdon | | | 22 August 1966 | TR3334446069; 51°09′58″N 1°20′11″E | | 1363358 | Upload Photo | Q26645189 |
| Jossenblock | II* | East Langdon | | | 22 August 1966 | TR3338246146; 51°10′01″N 1°20′13″E | | 1070051 | Upload Photo | Q17557648 |
| Langdon Court | II | East Langdon | | | 23 April 1987 | TR3320146166; 51°10′02″N 1°20′04″E | | 1363359 | Upload Photo | Q26645190 |
| The Rectory | II | East Langdon | | | 22 August 1966 | TR3331046147; 51°10′01″N 1°20′09″E | | 1070053 | Upload Photo | Q26323584 |
| Barn About 100 Metres West of Langdon Abbey | II | Langdon Abbey | | | 23 April 1987 | TR3249946926; 51°10′27″N 1°19′29″E | | 1070056 | Upload Photo | Q26323586 |
| Langdon Abbey | II* | Langdon Abbey | abbey | | 27 August 1952 | TR3263446960; 51°10′28″N 1°19′36″E | | 1070055 | Langdon Abbey More images | Q6485793 |
| Wall About 25 Metres North East of Barn at Langdon Abbey | II | Langdon Abbey | | | 23 April 1987 | TR3252146967; 51°10′29″N 1°19′30″E | | 1337016 | Upload Photo | Q26621471 |
| Granary and Ha-ha About 15 Metres South of Marston Hall | II | Martin | | | 23 April 1987 | TR3388546973; 51°10′27″N 1°20′41″E | | 1366273 | Upload Photo | Q26647878 |
| Marston Hall and Outhouses with Donkey Wheel | II | Martin | | | 22 August 1966 | TR3389546998; 51°10′28″N 1°20′41″E | | 1070057 | Upload Photo | Q26323588 |
| Solton Manor Farmhouse | II | Solton | | | 22 August 1952 | TR3394045281; 51°09′32″N 1°20′39″E | | 1070058 | Upload Photo | Q26323590 |

== See also ==
- Grade I listed buildings in Kent
- Grade II* listed buildings in Kent

== Sources ==
- Newman, John (2013) [1969], Kent: North-East and East, The Buildings of England, New Haven and London: Yale University Press, ISBN 978-0-300-18506-5
