= Lady Ursula =

Lady Ursula may refer to:

== People ==
- Ursula Pole, Baroness Stafford (c.1504–1570), English noblewoman
- Ursula Kathleen Hicks, Lady Hicks (1896–1985), Irish economist and academic
- Ursula Ridley, Viscountess Ridley (1904–1967), British government official and charity worker
- Lady Ursula d'Abo (1916–2017), English socialite
- Ursula Bethell, Baroness Westbury (1924–2023), British philanthropist
