= Aldred Lumley, 10th Earl of Scarbrough =

Anglo-Irish peer, soldier and landowner

Major-General The Right Honourable The Earl of Scarbrough KG GBE KCB TD GCStJ
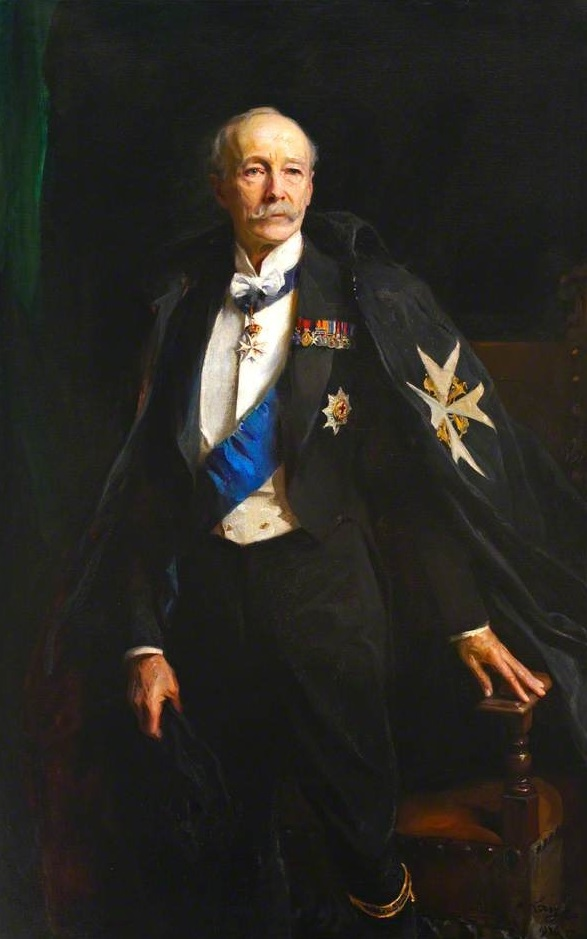
- Portrait by Philip Alexius de László, 1930

Personal details
- Born: Aldred Frederick George Beresford Lumley; 16 November 1857 Tickhill Castle, Yorkshire
- Died: 4 March 1945 (aged 87) Rotherham, Yorkshire
- Party: Conservative
- Spouse: Lucy Cecilia Dunn-Gardner (m. 1899; died 1931)
- Children: Lady Serena Lumley
- Parents: Richard Lumley, 9th Earl of Scarbrough (father); Frederica Drummond (mother)
- Education: Eton College
- Occupation: soldier, politician, landowner

Military service
- Allegiance: United Kingdom
- Branch/service: British Army
- Years of service: 1877–1883; 1892–1921
- Rank: Major-General
- Unit: 7th Hussars; Imperial Yeomanry; Yorkshire Dragoons; Yorkshire Mounted Brigade; Territorial Force
- Battles/wars: Anglo-Zulu War; First Boer War; Second Boer War

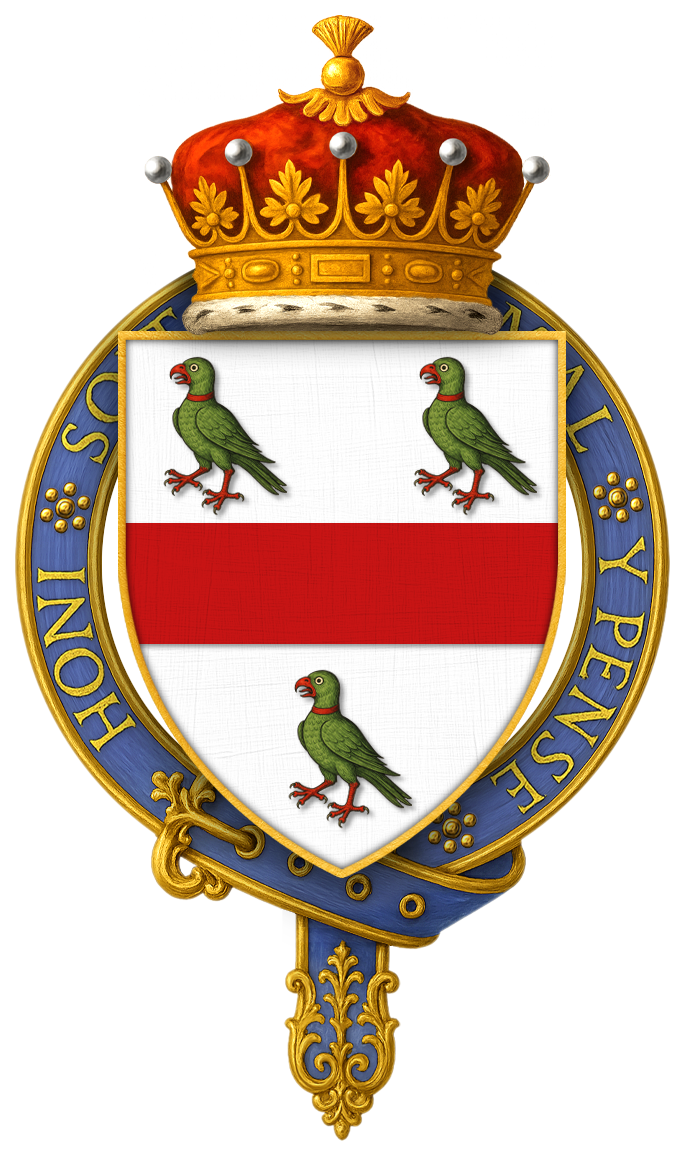
Garter-encircled shield of Arms of Aldred Lumley, 10th Earl of Scarbrough, KG, GBE, KCB, TD, GCStJ

Aldred Frederick George Beresford Lumley, 10th Earl of Scarbrough (16 November 1857 – 4 March 1945), styled Viscount Lumley from 1868 to 1884, was an Anglo-Irish peer, soldier and landowner. He was noted for his long service in both the Territorial Army and politics, which included 60 years in the House of Lords, and for his contributions to the growth of the seaside resort of Skegness, Lincolnshire.

== Early life ==
Lumley was born at Tickhill Castle in the West Riding of Yorkshire, the second son of Richard Lumley, 9th Earl of Scarbrough and Frederica Drummond, granddaughter of the fifth Duke of Rutland. On his paternal grandmother's side of the family, he was descended from the Beresford family; his notable Irish relatives included Bishop George Beresford and the Earl of Tyrone. He was educated at Eton. His elder brother Lyulph, Viscount Lumley died in 1868 at age 18, leaving Aldred as heir to the family titles.

== Career ==
In 1877, he was gazetted to the 7th Hussars. He served for six years and saw service in the Anglo-Zulu War in 1879. He was in Natal at the outbreak of the First Boer War in 1881. In 1883, he left the service to assist his ailing father in the managing of their estates at Sandbeck Park in South Yorkshire and Lumley Castle in County Durham. After his father's death the following year, he was forced to let the family seat of Sandbeck Park due to the Great Agricultural Depression.

Scarbrough was an avid sailor and member of the Royal Yacht Club. For six years, he sailed around the world, visiting India, Africa, the West Indies, and Central and South America. He travelled with the explorer Frank Linsly James aboard HMS Waterwitch and was with him when James was killed by an elephant in 1890 in Gabon.

He was a member of the council of the Royal Niger Company and during this time visited Africa with Sir George Goldie to make treaties with tribal chiefs. During his travels, he developed a keen interest in botany.

He was Lord Lieutenant of the West Riding of Yorkshire from 1892 to 1904. On 24 October 1891 he was appointed Lieutenant-Colonel in command of the Yorkshire Dragoons, a local Yeomanry regiment. In early February 1900 he was appointed second in command of a Battalion of Imperial Yeomanry, with the temporary rank of Major in the Army, and served with it in the Second Boer War. After his return to the United Kingdom, he was appointed an aide-de-camp to King Edward VII in the 1902 Coronation Honours list on 26 June 1902, with the regular rank of colonel. He served as such until the King's death in 1910. He was commander of the Yorkshire Mounted Brigade, Chairman of the West Riding Territorial Association from 1908, and Director-General of the Territorial Force with the honorary rank of Major-General from February 1917 until his retirement in 1921. He was appointed Honorary Colonel of the 54th (West Riding & Staffordshire) Medium Brigade, Royal Artillery, on 10 March 1923.

Scarbrough was appointed Knight Grand Cross of the Order of the British Empire (GBE) shortly before his retirement from the Territorial Force in 1921 for his military service. He was knighted and was a Sub-Prior of the Order of the Hospital of Saint John of Jerusalem from 1923 to 1943.

== Skegness ==
In addition to his estates in Yorkshire, the earl owned considerable land around the seaside town of Skegness, Lincolnshire, which became accessible by railway in 1873. At that time it was a small fishing village. Recognising its potential value as a holiday destination, Scarbrough and his business agent planned to transform Skegness into a resort town. For three decades, he helped spur the town's growth with his plans, included constructing a large pier, a church, tree-lined promenades, parks, gardens, houses and hotels. A village of just 500 people in 1850, the town grew to 2,000 permanent residents by the turn of the century.

== Family ==
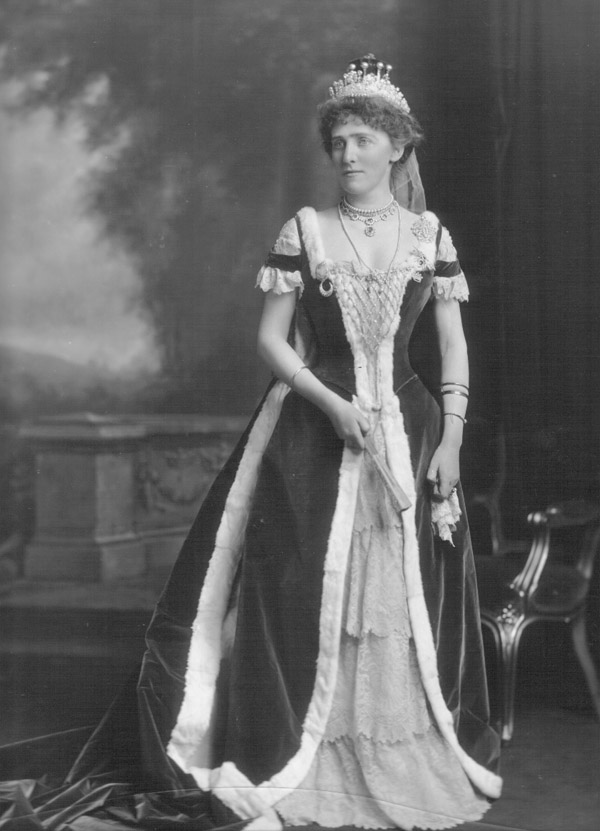
Countess of Scarbrough, photographed 27 November 1902.

On 8 April 1899, Scarbrough married Lucy Cecilia Dunn-Gardner (d. 24 November 1931), widow of Col. Robert Ashton (d. 1898), at Christ Church, Mayfair. Lucy was the daughter of Cecil Dunn-Gardner and was herself made a Dame of Grace of the Order of Saint John of Jerusalem for her work with the hospital. His wife brought a stepson and stepdaughter to their marriage. She and the earl had a single daughter, Lady Serena Lumley (1901–2000), who married the Hon. Robert James, third son of Baron Northbourne. Their elder daughter Ursula James married David Allan Bethell, 5th Baron Westbury (1922–2001) in 1947; the princesses Elizabeth and Margaret and the Duke and Duchess of Gloucester attended their wedding at St Martin-in-the-Fields. Their eldest son Richard Bethell, 6th Baron Westbury is the present baron. Their youngest daughter, Serena Fay James,(1929-2002) married Colin Griffith Campion (1933-2016) and they had 4 children: Georgina Serena, Christina Fay, Meriona Patricia and Marcus Robert Guy.

Scarbrough's stepdaughter Dorothy Violet Ashton (1885–1956) married in 1914 Lord Gerald Wellesley (1885–1972), who succeeded his nephew as Duke in 1943. The marriage was not a great success, but produced a son and daughter. The son was the 8th Duke of Wellington (1915–2014). Lady Serena later refused the marriage proposal of her brother-in-law, by then Duke of Wellington, after their respective spouses had died.

The earl died in 1945 and was succeeded in the family titles by his nephew, Sir Roger Lumley.

== Honours ==

| Ribbon | Description | Notes |
| | Order of the Garter (KG) | Knight Companion; 1929 |
| | Order of the British Empire (GBE) | 12 February 1921; Knight Grand Cross; Military Division |
| | Order of the Bath (KCB) | Knight Commander |
| | Order of St. John (GCStJ) | 12 June 1926; Bailiff Grand Cross |
| | South Africa Medal | With "1879" Clasp |
| | Queen's South Africa Medal | |
| | Service Medal of the Order of St John | Long service with the Order of St John |
| | Territorial Decoration (TD) | Long Service in Territorial Army |

Military offices
| Vacant Title last held by The Earl FitzWilliam | Colonel of The Yorkshire Dragoons (Queen's Own); 1908–1935 | Succeeded by The Viscount Halifax |
Honorary titles
| Preceded by The Earl FitzWilliam | Lord Lieutenant of the West Riding of Yorkshire; 1892–1904 | Succeeded by The Earl of Harewood |
Peerage of England
| Preceded by Richard Lumley | Earl of Scarbrough; 1884–1945 | Succeeded by Lawrence Lumley |
