= Ursula Bethell, Baroness Westbury =

British noblewoman (1924–2023)

The Right Honourable The Lady Westbury CBE GCStJ JP
- Born: Ursula Mary Rose James; 6 May 1924; Mayfair, London, England
- Died: 25 November 2023 (aged 99)
- Spouse(s): David Bethell, 5th Baron Westbury (m. 1947; died 2001)
- Children: 3
- Relatives: Walter James, 2nd Baron Northbourne (grandfather); Aldred Lumley, 10th Earl of Scarbrough (grandfather)

Ursula Mary Rose Bethell, Baroness Westbury CBE, GCStJ, JP (née James; 6 May 1924 – 25 November 2023) was a British peeress who served as superintendent-in-chief of St John Ambulance.

== Early life and family ==
Lady Westbury was born Ursula Mary Rose James on 6 May 1924 at 21 Park Lane in Mayfair, the home of her maternal grandfather. She was daughter of the Hon. Robert "Bobbie" James (1873–1960), third son of Walter, 2nd Baron Northbourne, and Lady Serena Lumley (1901–2000), only daughter of Aldred, 10th Earl of Scarbrough. Portraits of Ursula and her younger sister Fay (1929–2002) by Bassano are in the collection of the National Portrait Gallery.

Growing up in aristocratic circles in Central London, she befriended Princesses Elizabeth and Margaret of York who lived nearby at 145 Piccadilly. Ursula and Princess Elizabeth dined together at The Dorchester before her younger sister's coming-out ball at Apsley House in July 1947 (Dorothy Wellesley, Duchess of Wellington was their maternal aunt, their father was a former brother-in-law of Gerald Wellesley, 7th Duke of Wellington), the evening before the princess's engagement to Lieutenant Philip Mountbatten was announced.

She spent part of her childhood and the years of World War II at St Nicholas, her father's 17th-century home in Richmond in the North Riding of Yorkshire. Despite not being Roman Catholic, she was educated at the Convent of the Assumption in Richmond.

== Career ==
Lady Westbury's career with St John Ambulance began when she became County Vice-president of the East Riding of Yorkshire in 1954. Her grandfather Lord Scarbrough had been Sub-Prior of the Order of St John, which oversees the ambulance brigade, from 1923 to 1943. In 1983, with Princess Margaret's encouragement, she accepted the position of superintendent-in-chief. In this role, she modernized and expanded the outreach of the organization. She organized a party in Hyde Park attended by Queen Elizabeth II to celebrate its centenary in 1988. She stepped down as superintendent-in-chief in 1990 and was made a Dame Grand Cross of the Order of St John, having already been made an Officer in 1975, a Commander in 1980 and a Dame in 1983. She was also made a Commander of the Order of the British Empire in the 1990 New Year Honours. From 1984, she also served as president of the Women's Electrical Association.

In her retirement, she was director of Toynbee Hall and the Brendoncare Foundation. She also sat on the grant sub-committee of the Royal Variety Charity.

== Marriage and family ==
On 21 October 1947, she married Captain The Hon. David Allan Bethell MC (1922–2001), grandson of Richard, 3rd Baron Westbury, at the Church of St Martin-in-the-Fields, London. Princesses Elizabeth and Margaret attended the wedding. In 1961, Bethell succeeded his older brother as 5th Baron Westbury. They had three children including Richard Nicholas Bethell, 6th Baron Westbury (born 1950).

Lady Westbury died on 25 November 2023, at the age of 99.
