= Christopher James, 5th Baron Northbourne =

British farmer and aristocrat (1926–2019)

The Right Honourable The Lord Northbourne DL FRICS
- Northbourne in Parliament, 2016

Member of the House of Lords
- Lord Temporal
- Hereditary peerage 5 November 1982 – 11 November 1999
- Preceded by: The 4th Baron Northbourne
- Succeeded by: Seat abolished
- Elected Hereditary Peer; 11 November 1999 – 4 September 2018
- Election: 1999
- Preceded by: Seat established
- Succeeded by: The 7th Baron Carrington

Personal details
- Born: Christopher George Walter James; 18 February 1926
- Died: 8 September 2019 (aged 93) Northbourne, England
- Children: 4
- Parent: Walter James, 4th Baron Northbourne
- Education: Eton College
- Alma mater: Magdalen College, Oxford
- Occupation: Farmer, businessman, and peer

Christopher George Walter James, 5th Baron Northbourne, 6th Baronet (18 February 1926 – 8 September 2019), was a British farmer and aristocrat. He was one of the ninety hereditary peers elected to remain in the House of Lords after the passing of the House of Lords Act 1999 until his retirement in 2018, and sat as a crossbencher.

== Biography ==
The son of Walter James, 4th Baron Northbourne, and his wife, Katharine Louise Nickerson of Boston, Massachusetts, he succeeded to his father's title in 1982. He was educated at Eton College in Berkshire and Magdalen College, Oxford, where he graduated with a Master of Arts in 1959.

Lord Northbourne served as the Crossbench spokesman for families and children in the House of Lords. He was deputy chair of Toynbee Hall and had been chair of Betteshanger Farms Ltd until 1997. Since 1999, he has been chair of the Parenting Support Forum and governor of Wye College. Since 2002, he has been also chair of the Stepney Children's Fund. He was a Deputy Lieutenant and a Fellow of the Royal Institution of Chartered Surveyors (FRICS).

He retired from the House of Lords on 4 September 2018.

He died on 8 September 2019 at the age of 93.

Lord Northbourne's garden at Elizabethan Northbourne Court near Deal in Kent, set within the standing former outbuildings (the manor house burned in the 18th century) and upon ancient terracing, nurtured for a century, is reputed one of the finest in England; it is not generally open to the public.

== Family ==
On 18 July 1959, the future Baron married Aliky Louise Hélène Marie-Sygne Claudel, daughter of Henri Charles Claudel, and granddaughter of Paul Claudel.

They had four children:

- Charles Walter Henri James, 6th Baron Northbourne (14 June 1960); married Catherine Lucy Burrows on 3 October 1987. They have three children, two sons and a daughter:
  - Henry Christopher William James (born 3 December 1988), the heir apparent
  - Anastasia Aliki James (born 18 February 1992)
  - Alexander Oliver Charles James (born 27 February 1996)
- Hon. Anthony Christopher Walter Paul James (14 January 1963); married with two children.
- Hon. Sebastian Richard Edward Cuthbert James (11 March 1966); married Anna Katherine Gregory in August 1997. They have three sons and a daughter.
- Hon. Ophelia Mary Katherine Christine Aliki James (23 August 1969); married Jocelyn Charles Stewart Hoare. They have two children.

== Notes ==
Peerage of the United Kingdom
Preceded by Walter James	Baron Northbourne; 1982–2019; Member of the House of Lords (1982–1999)	Succeeded by Charles James
Baronetage of the United Kingdom
Preceded by Walter James	Baronet of Langley Hall; 1982–2019	Succeeded by Charles James
Parliament of the United Kingdom
New office created by the House of Lords Act 1999	Elected hereditary peer to the House of Lords under the House of Lords Act 1999; 1999–2018	Succeeded by The Lord Carrington
