= George Hutt =

Sir George Hutt KCB (1 March 1809 – 27 September 1889) was a British Indian Army officer.

Hutt was born in St Helens, Isle of Wight, Hampshire, the son of Richard Hutt and Gilly Flower. His mother died in 1815. His brother William Hutt was a British Liberal politician who was heavily involved in the colonization of New Zealand and South Australia.

Hutt was a distinguished officer of the old Indian artillery. He served with credit through the Scinde and Afghan campaigns of 1839–44, and for the performance of his battery at Meeanee was made a C.B. He commanded the artillery in the Persian war of 1857, and rendered valuable aid to Sir Bartle Frere in Scinde during the Indian Mutiny. When he retired in 1858 the government of Bombay thanked him for his services.

In 1865 he became registrar and secretary to the commissioners of Chelsea Hospital, and held that appointment until 1886, in which year he was made K.C.B.

He died at Appley Towers, 27 September 1889. He married, in 1862, Adela, daughter of General Sir John Scott, K.C.B., by whom he left a family.

His brother John Hutt was the second governor of Western Australia.
