= Cuthbert Rippon =

British politician

Member of Parliament for Gateshead
- In office 1832–1841
- Preceded by: Constituency established
- Succeeded by: Sir William Hutt

Personal details
- Born: 29 May 1797
- Died: 14 May 1867 (aged 69)
- Party: Radical

Cuthbert Rippon (29 April 1797 – 14 April 1867) was a British politician.

Rippon was the son of a wealthy stockbroker, who bought several estates in County Durham. Cuthbert lived at Stanhope Castle.

Rippon stood at Gateshead at the 1832 UK general election, and was elected as a Whig. On the radical wing of the party, he supported three-year parliaments, the abolition of tithes and all monopolies, the removal of bishops from the House of Lords, and of clergy from automatically qualifying as magistrates.

Rippon was re-elected at the 1835 and 1837 UK general elections, and stood down in 1841.

Parliament of the United Kingdom
New constituency	Member of Parliament for Gateshead; 1832 – 1841	Succeeded by William Hutt
