= Baron Northbourne =

Barony in the Peerage of the United Kingdom

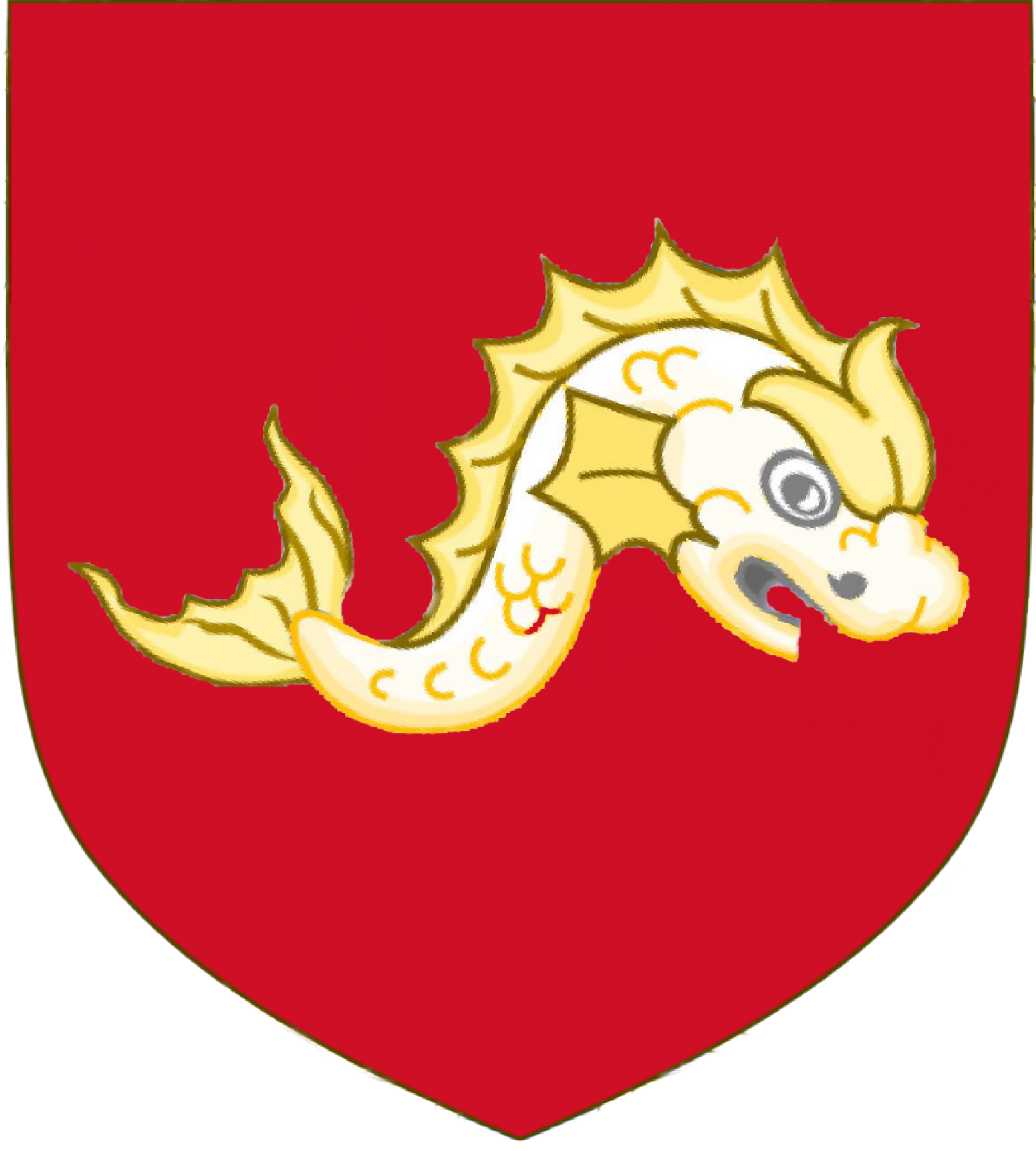
- Arms of James, Barons Northbourne: Gules, a dolphin, naiant, in fesse, or.
- Creation date: 5 November 1884
- Created by: Queen Victoria
- Peerage: United Kingdom
- First holder: Walter James, 1st Baron Northbourne
- Present holder: Charles James, 6th Baron Northbourne
- Heir apparent: Henry Christopher William James
- Subsidiary titles: Baronet James, of Langley Hall
- Motto: J'amie à Jamais

Baron Northbourne, of Betteshanger in the County of Kent, is a title in the Peerage of the United Kingdom. It was created in 1884 for Sir Walter James, 2nd Baronet, who had earlier represented Kingston upon Hull in the House of Commons as a Conservative. His son, the second Baron, sat as a Liberal Member of Parliament for Gateshead. The latter's great-grandson, the fifth Baron, who succeeded his father in 1982, was one of the ninety elected hereditary peers that were allowed to remain in the House of Lords after the passing of the House of Lords Act 1999, and sat as a cross-bencher until his retirement in 2018. As of 2019, the titles are held by his son, the sixth baron, who succeeded his father in that year.

The James baronetcy, of Langley Hall, in the County of Berkshire, was created in the Baronetage of Great Britain in 1791 for the first Baron's grandfather Sir Walter James, the last Warden of the Mint. Born Walter James Head, he assumed by an act of Parliament, Head's Name Act 1778 (18 Geo. 3. c. 22 Pr.), the surname of James only in 1778, on inheriting the estates of his brother William (himself having inherited the estates of their uncle-in-law, John James of Denford Court). His son and heir John James notably served as Minister Plenipotentiary to the Netherlands. The latter was the father of the second Baronet, who was raised to the peerage in 1884.

The Hon. Cuthbert James, second son of the second Baron, represented Bromley in the House of Commons as a Conservative between 1919 and 1930.

The first Baron Northbourne was the grandson of Robert Stewart, 1st Marquess of Londonderry, making him first cousin twice removed of Sir Winston Churchill, who was the grandson of his first cousin Lady Frances Anne Vane, Duchess of Marlborough. He was also the great grandson of Charles Pratt, 1st Earl Camden.

== James baronets, of Langley Hall (1791) ==
- Sir Walter James James, 1st Baronet (1759–1829)
  - John James (died 1818)
- Sir Walter Charles James, 2nd Baronet (1816–1893) (created Baron Northbourne in 1884)

=== Baron Northbourne (1884) ===
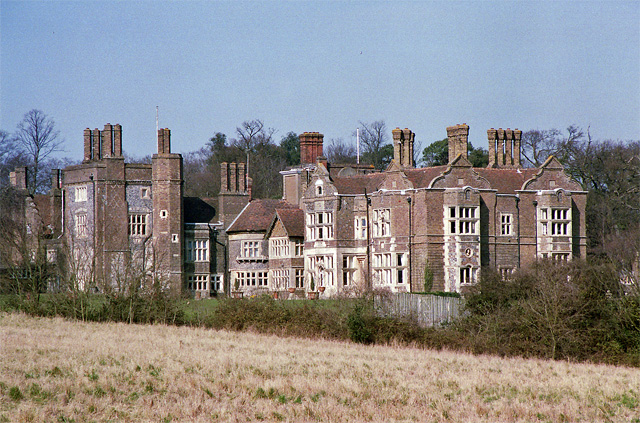
Betteshanger House, Northbourne

- Walter Charles James, 1st Baron Northbourne (1816–1893)
- Walter Henry James, 2nd Baron Northbourne (1846–1923)
- Walter John James, 3rd Baron Northbourne (1869–1932)
- Walter Ernest Christopher James, 4th Baron Northbourne (1896–1982)
- Christopher George Walter James, 5th Baron Northbourne (1926–2019)
- Charles Walter Henri James, 6th Baron Northbourne (born 1960)

The heir apparent is his elder son, the Hon. Henry Christopher William James (born 1988).

=== Title succession chart ===
Title succession chart, Barons Northbourne

Sir Walter James; 1st Baronet; 1759–1829
John James died 1818
Baron Northbourne
Walter James; 1st Baron Northbourne; 2nd Baronet; 1816–1893
Walter James; 2nd Baron Northbourne; 1846–1923
Walter James; 3rd Baron Northbourne; 1869–1932
Walter James; 4th Baron Northbourne; 1896–1982
Christopher James; 5th Baron Northbourne; 1926–2019
Charles James; 6th Baron Northbourne born 1960
Hon. Christopher James born 1988

=== Line of succession ===
- Walter Charles James, 1st Baron Northbourne (1816–1893)
  - Walter Henry James, 2nd Baron Northbourne (1846–1923)
    - Walter John James, 3rd Baron Northbourne (1869–1932)
      - Walter Ernest Christopher James, 4th Baron Northbourne (1896–1982)
        - Christopher George Walter James, 5th Baron Northbourne (1926–2019)
          - Charles Walter Henri James, 6th Baron Northbourne (born 1960)
            - (1) Hon. Henry Christopher William James (born 1988)
            - (2) Hon. Alexander Oliver Charles James (born 1996)
          - (3) Hon. Anthony Christopher Walter Paul James (born 1963)
            - (4) Edward Christopher William James (born 2001)
          - (5) Hon. Sebastian Richard Edward Cuthbert James (born 1966)
            - (6) Arthur Sebastian Christopher Hamilton James (born 1999)
            - (7) Alfred Sebastian Anthony Walter James (born 2001)
            - (8) Albert Linus Sebastian Harry James (born 2006)
    - Lt.-Col. Hon. Cuthbert James (1872–1930)
      - Maj. Thomas James (1906–1976)
        - Antony Nigel James (1944–2016)
          - (9) Alexander Robert James (born 1974)
            - (10) Georgie James (born 2001)
    - Hon. Wilfred James (1874–1908)
      - Henry Norman James (1903–1989)
        - (11) John Henry James (born 1947)
          - (12) Nicholas John James (born 1976)

== Notes ==
Baronetage of Great Britain
Preceded by Lushington baronets	James baronets of Langley Hall; 28 July 1791	Succeeded by Erskine baronets
