= William Hutt (politician) =

British Liberal politician

The Right Honourable Sir William Hutt KCB

Paymaster General and Vice-President of the Board of Trade
- In office 22 February 1860 – 29 November 1865
- Monarch: Victoria
- Prime Minister: The Viscount Palmerston; The Earl Russell
- Preceded by: Hon. William Cowper
- Succeeded by: George Goschen

Member of Parliament for Gateshead
- In office 1841–1874
- Preceded by: Cuthbert Rippon
- Succeeded by: Walter James

Member of Parliament for Kingston upon Hull
- In office 1838–1841
- Preceded by: William Wilberforce
- Succeeded by: John Hanmer

Member of Parliament for Kingston upon Hull
- In office 1832–1837
- Preceded by: William Battie-Wrightson
- Succeeded by: William Wilberforce

Personal details
- Born: 6 October 1801 Bishops Stortford, Hertfordshire
- Died: 24 November 1882 (aged 81) Appley Towers, Ryde, Isle of Wight
- Party: Liberal
- Spouse(s): 1 Mary Milner (d. 1860) (2) Frances Stanhope (d. 1886)
- Relations: John Hutt (brother)
- Education: Trinity College, Cambridge

Sir William Hutt, KCB, PC (6 October 1801 – 24 November 1882) was a British Liberal politician who was heavily involved in the colonisation of New Zealand and South Australia.

== Background and education ==
Hutt was born in Bishops Stortford, Hertfordshire. He was the brother of Sir George Hutt and John Hutt, the second governor of Western Australia. He was educated privately at Ryde, Isle of Wight, and Camberwell, and graduated BA (1827) and MA (1831) from Trinity College, Cambridge.

== Political career ==
Hutt entered Parliament as MP for Kingston upon Hull in 1832, holding the seat until 1837, when William Wilberforce defeated him. He regained it in 1838 when Wilberforce was unseated on petition. He had an interest in colonial affairs, and became increasingly involved in them. He served as a member of the select committee on colonial lands in 1836; as a commissioner for the foundation of South Australia; as a member of the New Zealand Association from 1837; and as a member of the select committee on New Zealand in 1840. He also helped form (1839) the re-incarnated New Zealand Company, of which he later became a director and chairman.

After he ceased to be MP for Hull in 1841, he successfully stood for the seat of Gateshead, a seat that he retained for over 30 years. He served as Vice-President of the Board of Trade and Paymaster General under Lord Palmerston between 1860 and 1865 and under Lord Russell in 1865 and was sworn of the Privy Council in 1860. In 1865 he became a Knight Commander of the Order of the Bath.

== Personal life ==
In 1831 Hutt married Mary (née Millner), Dowager Countess of Strathmore, widow of John Bowes, 10th Earl of Strathmore and Kinghorne, to whose son John Bowes Hutt had been a tutor. She died in 1860, leaving him mining properties worth £18,000 a year.

The following year he married Frances Anna Jane "Fanny" Stanhope, a daughter of the Hon. Sir Francis Charles Stanhope. The couple had a London home in Grosvenor Square.

Hutt died at Appley Towers, Ryde, on 24 November 1882, aged 81, leaving his landed property to his brother, Sir George Hutt. Frances, Lady Hutt, died in September 1886.

== Eponymous geography ==
Hutt is commemorated in the name of the Hutt River in the North Island of New Zealand and the cities of Lower Hutt and Upper Hutt, which stand on its banks. The Hutt River, South Australia and the Hutt River and Hutt Lagoon in Western Australia were also named in his honour. Hutt Street in Adelaide carries his name. The Bowes River in Western Australia was named after his wife Mary.

Parliament of the United Kingdom
Preceded by George Schonswar; William Battie-Wrightson	Member of Parliament for Kingston upon Hull; 1832 – 1837; With: Matthew Davenport Hill 1832–1835; David Carruthers 1835; Thomas Perronet Thompson 1835–1837	Succeeded by William Wilberforce; Sir Walter James, Bt
Preceded by William Wilberforce; Sir Walter James, Bt	Member of Parliament for Kingston upon Hull; 1838 – 1841; With: Sir Walter James, Bt	Succeeded by Sir John Hanmer, Bt; Sir Walter James, Bt
Preceded by Cuthbert Rippon	Member of Parliament for Gateshead; 1841 – 1874	Succeeded by Walter James
Political offices
Preceded by Hon. William Cowper	Vice-President of the Board of Trade; 1860–1865	Succeeded by George Goschen
Preceded by Hon. William Cowper	Paymaster General; 1860–1865	Succeeded by George Goschen
