= Martin, Kent =

Hamlet in Kent, England

Coordinates: 51.1790°N 1.3394°E

Martin
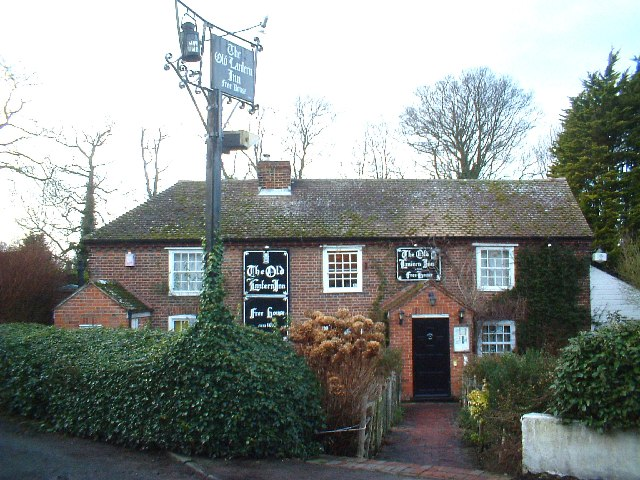
- The Old Lantern Inn, Martin

- Location within Kent
- OS grid reference: TR335475
- District: Dover
- Shire county: Kent
- Region: South East
- Country: England
- Sovereign state: United Kingdom
- Post town: Dover
- Postcode district: CT15
- Dialling code: 01304
- Police: Kent
- Fire: Kent
- Ambulance: South East Coast
- UK Parliament: Dover and Deal

Martin is a hamlet north-east of Dover in the county of Kent in England. The nearby village of Martin Mill is situated on the railway between Dover and Deal. The population of the village is included in the civil parish of Langdon.

It has a pub, The Lantern (refurbished in 2016), that is the main focal point. East Langdon Cricket Club has its base in Martin.
