= Martin Mill =

Village in Kent, England

Coordinates: 51.1696°N 1.3530°E

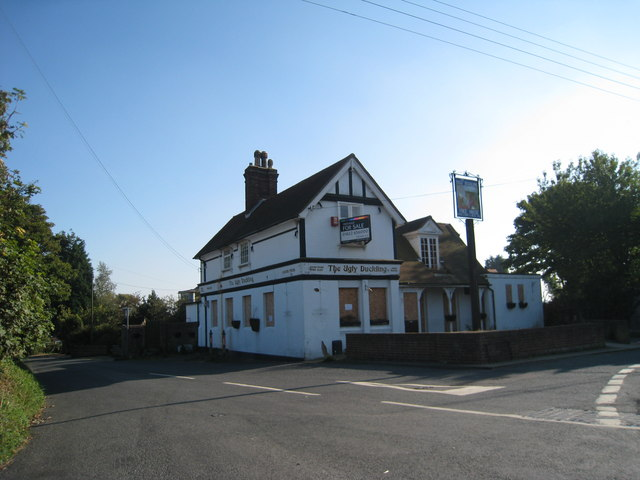
- The Ugly Duckling pub, Station Road

- Location within Kent
- OS grid reference: TR345465
- District: Dover
- Shire county: Kent
- Region: South East
- Country: England
- Sovereign state: United Kingdom
- Post town: Dover
- Postcode district: CT15
- Dialling code: 01304
- Police: Kent
- Fire: Kent
- Ambulance: South East Coast
- UK Parliament: Dover & Deal

Martin Mill is a village in east Kent, England. It takes its name from the nearby village of Martin. Martin Mill railway station is on the Dover to Deal railway line. The population of the village was, similarly to Martin, included in the civil parish of Langdon.

The windmill which gives Martin Mill its name operated commercially until about 1923, when Sydney Hogben, the owner and former operator, removed the sails. This caused outrage in the community. The remaining structure was demolished in the 1960s.

== History ==
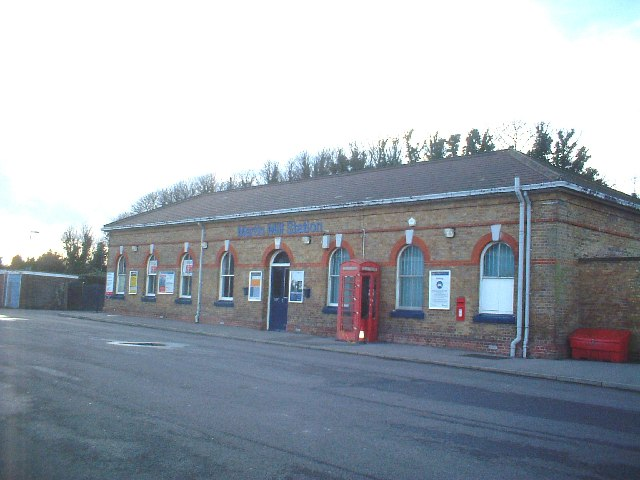
Martin Mill railway station

The original Martin Mill railway was constructed and operated by Pearson & Son in 1897 for the construction of the Admiralty harbour. The line was laid to standard gauge from Martin Mill station and needed very little earth works until it reached the cliffs where terraces with a gradient of about 1 in 25 were cut into the cliff face to form a switch back path down to the harbour. The line was in use until completion of the harbour and eventually dismantled in 1937 after the intention of using it as a passenger line failed.

== Martin Mill Military Railway ==
During the second world war the line was relaid again to standard gauge following the original course to a point north of Fan Bay Battery, from there two new lines where laid eastwards either side of the Dover to St Margaret's road and both terminating at St Margaret's. The northern line supplied the 14 inch Mk VII naval-type guns "Winnie" and "Pooh", and was also laid with two curved firing spurs for the 13.5" rail mounted guns "Gladiator", "Scene Shifter", and "Piece Maker".

The railway guns were 13.5 inch ex-naval guns on World War I-type mountings; "Scene Shifter" recycled the name and carriage from a former 14 inch railway gun, the other carriages were left over from a World War I 18 inch railway howitzer programme. These had a maximum elevation of 39 deg, traverse was by using the guns on a curved spur with the degrees marked along the tracks, a large arrow was mounted on the guns' bogies to line up with the marks. Recoil was absorbed by special brakes acting on the wheels. "Boche Buster", an 18-inch howitzer on a former World War I 14 inch railway gun carriage, was deployed in November 1943. Maintenance and barrel changing was carried out at the disused Stone Hall Colliery sidings Lydden.

The southernmost line had a curved firing spur close to Fan Bay. The line then continued to Wanston battery where two spurs where laid in front of the guns "Clem" and "Jane" for barrel changing. The barrels being transported by rail to Woolwich Arsenal where they were re-sleeved. There was also a short bypass loop north of the line. The line continued passing South Foreland battery to the 13.5" hypervelocity gun "Bruce" and would also have served St Margaret's Battery.

The line was entirely worked by diesel-electric shunting locomotives requisitioned from the LMS (London Midland Scottish) and SR (Southern Railway), three from the SR and six from the LMS the smoke from a steam locomotive being visible above the cliffs would have given the guns positions away. The LMS locomotives being a long way from home were on an exchange basis if a locomotive failed it was immediately replaced from LMS stock, repaired at Derby works and worked on the LMS until required again. The SR locomotives, being on home turf, were quickly repaired at Ashford works. As the locomotives shared the same English Electric diesel engines it is probable minor engine repairs for the LMS locos could be carried out at Ashford. Whilst on the MMMR the locomotives were stabled at the shed in Martin Mill station Yard.

The line was again lifted just after the end of the war.

== See also ==
- Martin, Kent
