= David Carruthers (MP) =

British politician

David Carruthers (1779 – 9 June 1835) was a British politician.

Born in Devon, Carruthers lived in St Marylebone in London. He stood in the 1832 UK general election in Kingston upon Hull for the Conservative Party, where he was defeated. He stood again in the 1835 UK general election, and on this occasion topped the poll. However, he died later in the year.

Parliament of the United Kingdom
| Preceded by Matthew Davenport Hill; William Hutt | Member of Parliament for Kingston upon Hull; 1835 – 1835; With: William Hutt | Succeeded by William Hutt; Thomas Perronet Thompson |
