= Langdon, Iowa =

- Unincorporated community
- Location within Iowa
- Coordinates: 43°12′57″N 95°05′17″W
- Country: United States
- State: Iowa
- County: Clay
- Elevation: 1,368 ft (417 m)
- Time zone: UTC-6 (Central (CST))
  - Summer (DST): UTC-5 (CDT)
- Area code: 712
- GNIS feature ID: 458221

Langdon is an unincorporated community in Meadow Township, Clay County, Iowa, United States. Langdon is located along county highways B17 and M50, 5.6 miles (9.0 km) north-northeast of Spencer.

== History ==
Langdon's population was 16 in 1915, and 50 in 1925. The population was 60 in 1940.
