= Walter James, 1st Baron Northbourne =

British Member of Parliament

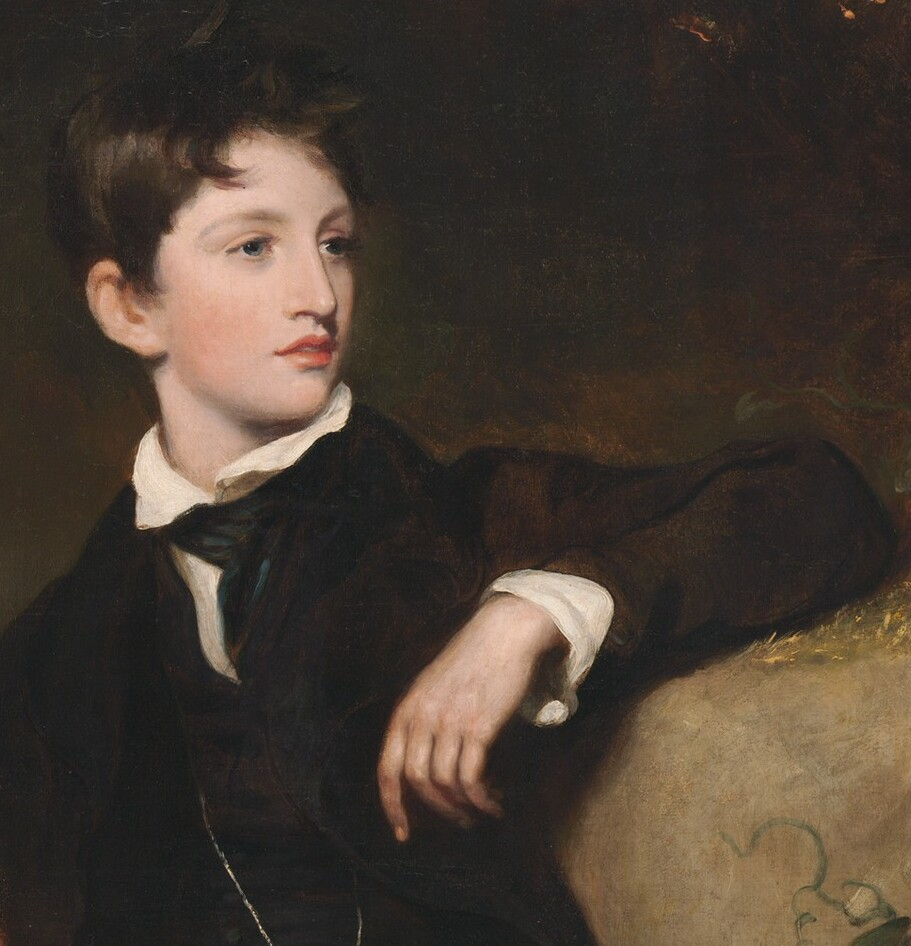
Walter James, age 13, in 1829 when he came into his title

Walter Charles James, 1st Baron Northbourne (3 June 1816 – 4 February 1893), known as Sir Walter James, 2nd Baronet, from 1829 to 1884, was a British Member of Parliament.

James was the son of John James, Minister Plenipotentiary to the Netherlands, and grandson of Sir Walter James, 1st Baronet. He succeeded his grandfather in the baronetcy in 1829, and in 1837 he was elected to the House of Commons for Kingston upon Hull as a Tory, a seat he held until 1847. He acquired Betteshanger House (now Northbourne Park School) in Kent in 1850 and commissioned George Devey to oversee extensions and alterations to the house.

He served as High Sheriff of Kent in 1855. He was a friend of William Ewart Gladstone, and in 1884, during Gladstone's second term as prime minister, he was raised to the peerage as Baron Northbourne, of Betteshanger in the County of Kent. From at least 1882 James was the lord of the manor of Langdon.

Lord Northbourne married Sarah Caroline Ellison, daughter of Cuthbert Ellison, in 1841. She died in 1890. Lord Northbourne survived her by three years and died in February 1893, aged 76. He was succeeded in his titles by his son Walter.

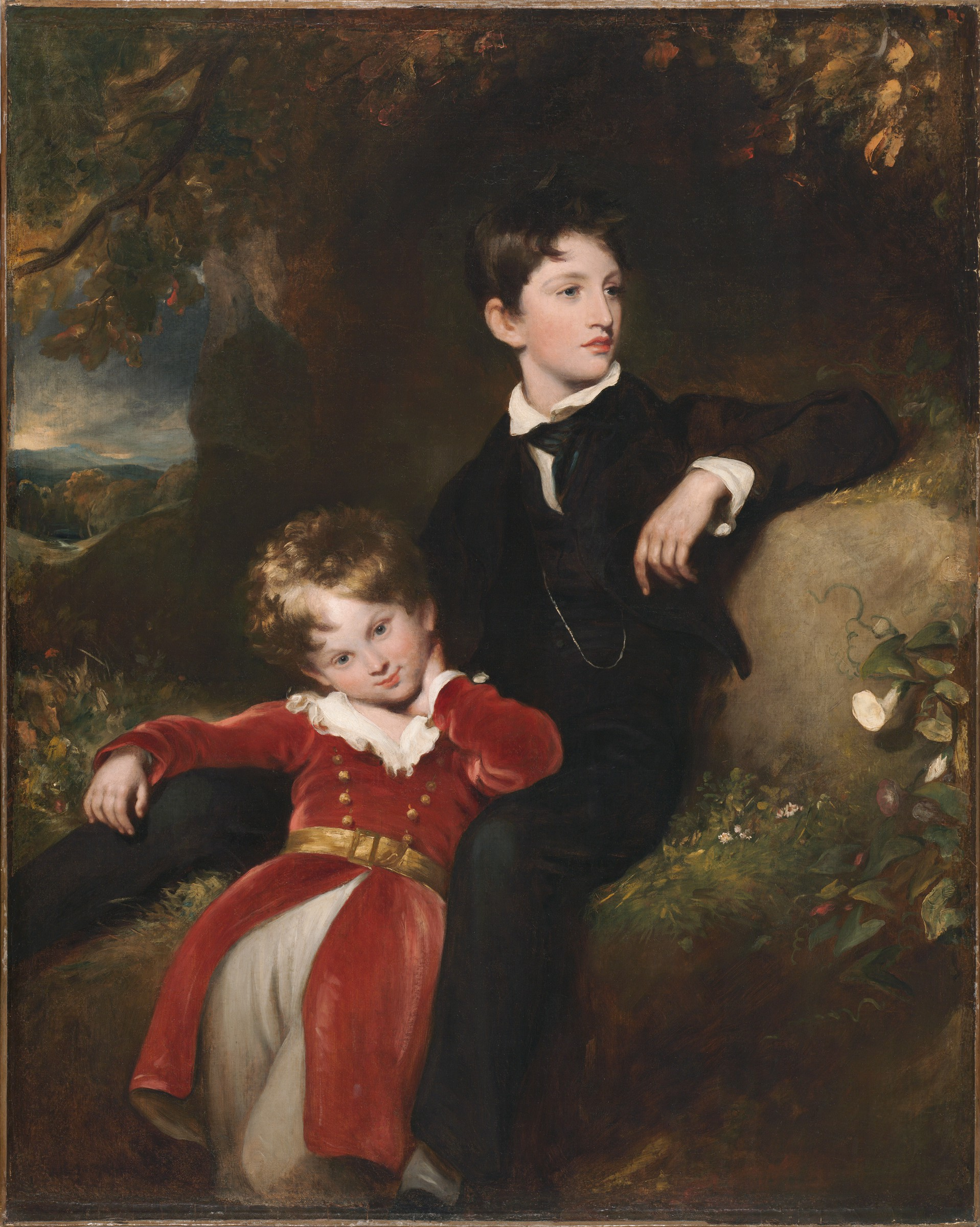
Stepbrothers Charles Stewart Hardinge age 6, and Walter Charles James age 13 in 1829, painted by Thomas Lawrence

== Ancestry ==
Ancestors of Walter James, 1st Baron Northbourne

16. Richard Head
8. Sir Thomas Head
17.
4. Sir Walter James, 1st Baronet
18. Rowland Holt
9. Jane Holt
19.
2. John James
20. Sir John Pratt
10. Charles Pratt, 1st Earl Camden
21. Elizabeth Wilson
5. Lady Jane Pratt
22. Nicholas Jeffreys
11. Elizabeth Jeffreys
23.
1. Walter James, 1st Baron Northbourne
24. William Stewart
12. Alexander Stewart
25.
6. Robert Stewart, 1st Marquess of Londonderry
26. John Cowan
13. Mary Cowen
27.
3. Lady Emily Jane Stewart
28. Sir John Pratt
14. Charles Pratt, 1st Earl Camden
29. Elizabeth Wilson
7. Lady Frances Pratt
30. Nicholas Jeffreys
15. Elizabeth Jeffreys
31.

Parliament of the United Kingdom
Preceded by William Hutt; Thomas Perronet Thompson	Member of Parliament for Kingston upon Hull; 1837–1847; With: William Wilberforce 1837–1838; William Hutt 1838–1841; Sir John Hanmer 1841–1847	Succeeded by Matthew Talbot Baines; James Clay
Peerage of the United Kingdom
New creation	Baron Northbourne; 1884–1893	Succeeded by Walter Henry James
Baronetage of Great Britain
Preceded by Walter James	Baronet; 1829–1893	Succeeded by Walter Henry James
