= Langdon (given name) =

Langdon is a masculine given name which may refer to:

- Langdon Cheves (1776–1857), American politician, lawyer and businessman
- Langdon Brown Gilkey (1919–2004), American theologian
- Langdon Lea (1874–1937), American college football Hall of Fame player and coach
- Langdon Elwyn Mitchell (1862–1935), American Broadway playwright
- Langdon Winner (born 1944), American academic and philosopher of technology
