= Walter James, 2nd Baron Northbourne =

British peer and Liberal politician

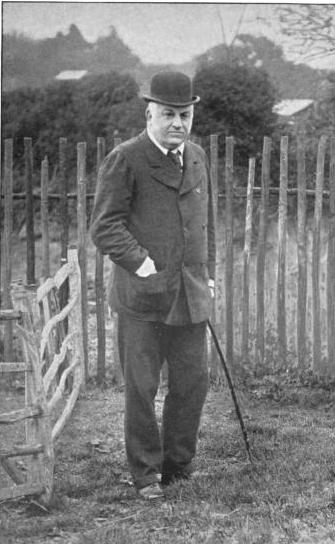
Walter James Baron Northbourne 1900

Walter Henry James, 2nd Baron Northbourne DL (25 March 1846 – 27 January 1923), was a British peer and Liberal politician.

James was the son of Walter James, 1st Baron Northbourne.

He attended Oxford University, and won a blue at tennis in 1868. He won his doubles match, but lost the singles to Cambridge University's Arthur Kinnaird.

He was elected to the House of Commons for Gateshead in 1874, a seat he held until 1893 when he succeeded his father in the barony and entered the House of Lords.

He was appointed Honorary Colonel of the 1st Cinque Ports Artillery Volunteers on 10 August 1898. From 1893 to at least 1913 James was the lord of the manor of Langdon.

Lord Northbourne married Edith Emeline Mary, daughter of John Newton Lane, in 1868.

- Hon. Sarah Agnes James (d. 19 Oct 1940) married Rev. Adolphus Benjamin Parry-Evans, son of Maj. Samuel Evans. They had no children.
- Walter John James, 3rd Baron Northbourne of Betteshanger (2 Sep 1869 – 22 Dec 1932)
- Lt.-Col. Hon. Cuthbert James (29 Feb 1872 – 21 July 1930)
- Hon. Robert James (13 May 1873 – 13 Dec 1960) married twice. Firstly to Lady Evelyn Kathleen Wellesley, daughter of Colonel Arthur Charles Wellesley, 4th Duke of Wellington on 18 June 1900. Over a year after her death Robert married secondly, Lady Serena Mary Barbara Lumley, daughter of Aldred Lumley, 10th Earl of Scarbrough on 23 July 1923. With Lady Evelyn he had one son, Maj. Walter, and with Serena two daughters: Ursula, wife of David Allan Bethell, 5th Baron Westbury, and Serena.
- Hon. Wilfred James (7 Dec 1874 – 10 Jan 1908) married Margaret Anne Stogdon, daughter of John Stogdon. They had two sons, and a daughter.

Northbourne died in January 1923, aged 76, and was succeeded in his titles by his eldest son Walter. Lady Northbourne died in 1929.

== Notes ==
Parliament of the United Kingdom
Preceded by Sir William Hutt	Member of Parliament for Gateshead; 1874–1893	Succeeded by Sir William Allan
Peerage of the United Kingdom
Preceded by Walter James	Baron Northbourne; 1893–1923	Succeeded by Walter James
