= Richard Bethell, 3rd Baron Westbury =

Richard Luttrell Pilkington Bethell, 3rd Baron Westbury (25 April 1852 – 21 February 1930) was a British soldier and peer, a member of the House of Lords from 1875 until his death.

Born at Littlehampton, the eldest of the four sons of Richard Augustus Bethell, 2nd Baron Westbury, and his wife Mary Florence Luttrell, a daughter of the Rev. Alexander Fownes Luttrell JP of East Quantoxhead, the young Bethell was commissioned into the Scots Fusilier Guards and became a Lieutenant. On 28 March 1875, on the death of his father, he succeeded as Baron Westbury, of Westbury, Wiltshire.

His younger brother Alexander Bethell joined the Royal Navy and rose to the rank of Vice-Admiral.

On 24 July 1882, Westbury married Lady Agatha Manners Tollemache, a daughter of William Tollemache, Lord Huntingtower, and Katharine Elizabeth Camila Burke. In 1881, she had been granted a royal warrant of precedence as the daughter of an earl. They had one son, Richard Bethell (26 April 1883 – 15 November 1929), who died before his father. The secretary of the archaeologist Howard Carter, he was found dead in a bed at a Mayfair club aged 46, probably smothered.

After a long illness, Westbury killed himself on 21 February 1930, aged 77, by jumping out of a seventh-floor bedroom window at his apartment in St James's, Westminster. He left a note reading: "I really cannot stand any more horrors and hardly see what good I am going to do here, so I am making my exit." His death was found to be suicide while of unsound mind. He was succeeded by his grandson Richard Morland Tollemache Bethell, 4th Baron Westbury (1914–1961).

== Notes ==
Peerage of the United Kingdom
Preceded by Richard Augustus Bethell	Baron Westbury; 1875–1930	Succeeded by Richard Bethell
