= Langdon, Cornwall =

Hamlet in Cornwall, England

Coordinates: 50°41′01″N 4°24′08″W

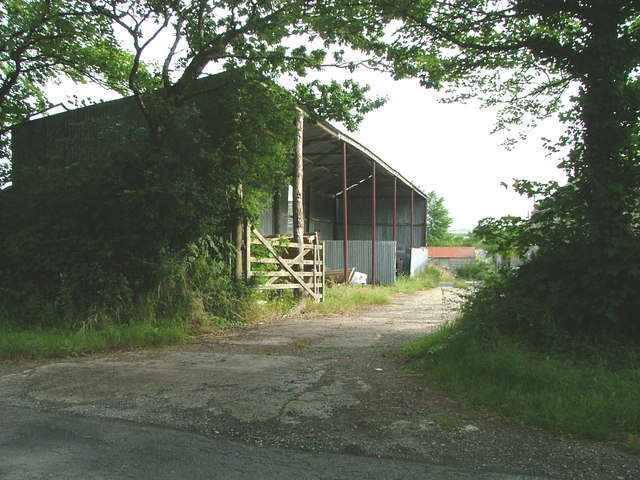
Outbuildings at Langdon

Langdon is a hamlet in north Cornwall approximately five miles north of Launceston; it is west of Canworthy. Langdon sits at 50.6839’ latitude and -4.40239954’ longitude.

The word Langdon comes from the original Old English meaning, 'Long Down' or 'Long Hill'.
