= Walter James, 4th Baron Northbourne =

British rower (1896–1982)

- Lord Northbourne in 1950

Personal information
- Born: Walter Ernest Christopher James; 18 January 1896 Kensington, London, England
- Died: 17 June 1982 (aged 86) Dover, England
- Spouse: Katherine Louise Nickerson (m. 1925; died 1980)
- Children: 5, including Christopher James, 5th Baron Northbourne

Sport
- Sport: Rowing
Medal record
Men's rowing
Representing Great Britain
Olympic Games
Silver medal – second place	1920 Antwerp	Eight

Walter Ernest Christopher James, 4th Baron Northbourne (18 January 1896 – 17 June 1982), was an English agriculturalist, author and rower who competed in the 1920 Summer Olympics.

== Life ==
James was the son of Walter James, 3rd Baron Northbourne, and his wife Laura Gwennlian (née Rice). He was educated at Sandroyd School and Eton College, then Oxford University where he studied agricultural science and was also an accomplished rower. In 1920 he was a member of the Oxford crew in the Boat Race. He was also a member of the Leander eight which won the silver medal for Great Britain rowing at the 1920 Summer Olympics, coming within half a length of winning. In 1921 he rowed for Oxford again in the Boat Race.

Lord Northbourne married in 1925 to Katherine Louise, daughter of George Augustus Nickerson, of Boston and Dedham, Massachusetts, and Ellen Nickerson (née Touzalin, later wife of Sir Horace Hood); they had five children. She died in 1980. Lord Northbourne survived her by two years and died in June 1982, aged 86. He was succeeded in his titles by his son Christopher.

== Agriculture and writing ==
James later applied the theories of Rudolf Steiner to the family estate at Kent. In 1939 he travelled to Switzerland to visit the leading exponent of biodynamic agriculture, Ehrenfried Pfeiffer. The outcome of that visit was that he hosted, at his farm in Kent, the Betteshanger Summer School and Conference, the first biodynamic farming conference to be held in Britain. It has been claimed that Northbourne coined the phrase "organic farming", but Northbourne explicitly denied this. In a letter to Ned Halley of the Rodale Press, he wrote: "I was certainly not the first to apply the word 'organic' to farming or gardening. I have never known the ideas and practices involved under any other name". While he is certainly one of the central figures of the early organic movement, it is arguable that Albert Howard was of greater importance. Northbourne published Look to the Land in 1940, which raises many of the issues current to discussions of organic agriculture. After reading Look to the Land, the philosopher and author Marco Pallis contacted Northbourne and later introduced him to the writings of the Traditionalist (also known as Perennialist) philosophy. Northbourne eventually integrated this thinking into his own writings and life, and became a correspondent with many of the most prominent writers of this school, as well as with Thomas Merton. He was also a frequent contributor to the quarterly journal Studies in Comparative Religion, which dealt with religious symbolism and the Traditionalist perspective.

Lord Northbourne was the English translator for the works of several fellow Traditionalists including René Guénon's major work, The Reign of Quantity and the Signs of the Times, Light on the Ancient Worlds by Frithjof Schuon, and Sacred Art in East and West by Titus Burckhardt.

== Bibliography ==
- Look to the Land (1940)
- Religion in the Modern World (1963)
- Looking Back on Progress (1970)
- James, Christopher; Fitzgerald, Joseph A., eds. (2008). Of the Land and the Spirit: The Essential Lord Northbourne on Ecology and Religion. World Wisdom.

== See also ==
- List of Oxford University Boat Race crews
- The Matheson Trust

Peerage of the United Kingdom
Preceded by Walter James	Baron Northbourne; 1932–1982	Succeeded by Christopher James
Baronetage of the United Kingdom
Preceded by Walter James	Baronet of Langley Hall; 1932–1982	Succeeded by Christopher James
