= Walter James, 3rd Baron Northbourne =

English painter, etcher and hereditary peer

Walter John James, 3rd Baron Northbourne RBA (2 September 1869 – 22 December 1932), was an English painter, etcher, and hereditary peer.

== Biography ==
James was born on 2 September 1869. He is the son of Walter James, 2nd Baron Northbourne, and his wife Edith Lane. He was educated at Harrow School, and Magdalen College, Oxford.

In 1919 Who's Who listed his occupation as "artist". His career as an artist began under the tutorage of the Italian landscape artist Giovanni Costa. He studied etching under Sir Frank Short at the Royal College of Art.

His works have been widely exhibited, including at the Royal Academy, Fine Art Society, and the Royal Society of British Artists. He had four one man shows in London during his lifetime. He was elected as an associate member (ARE) of the Royal Society of Painter-Etchers and Engravers in 1909, becoming a full member (RE) in 1912. He was also appointed a Trustee of the Wallace Collection.

== Family ==
Upon his father's death on 27 January 1923, he inherited the family title and estates.

On 4 October 1894, he married Laura Gwenllian Rice, who was the daughter of Admiral Sir Ernest Rice. They had four daughters, and one son, Walter James, 4th Baron Northbourne. James died at Betteshanger on 22 December 1932.

Peerage of the United Kingdom
Preceded by Walter James	Baron Northbourne; 1923–1932	Succeeded by Walter James
Baronetage of the United Kingdom
Preceded by Walter James	Baronet of Langley Hall; 1923–1932	Succeeded by Walter James
