= Baron Westbury =

Barony in the Peerage of the United Kingdom

Barony of Westbury
- Arms of Bethell: Argent, on a chevron, engrailed azure, between three boars' heads couped sable, an estoile or, all within a bordure of the third
- Creation date: 26 June 1861
- Created by: Queen Victoria
- Peerage: Peerage of the United Kingdom
- First holder: Sir Richard Bethell
- Present holder: Richard Bethell, 6th Baron Westbury
- Heir apparent: Hon. Alexander Bethell
- Remainder to: Heirs male of the first baron's body lawfully begotten
- Motto: Ap Ithel (Welsh: Bethell)

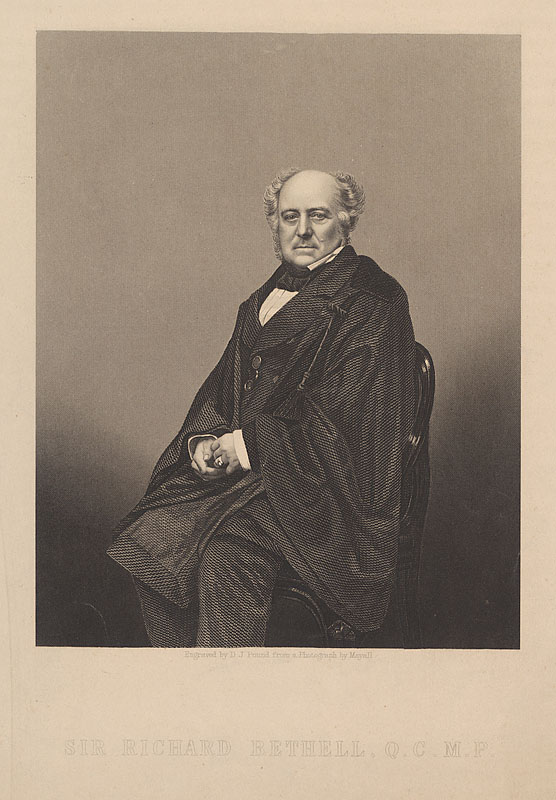
Richard Bethell, 1st Baron Westbury

Baron Westbury, of Westbury in the County of Wiltshire, is a title in the Peerage of the United Kingdom. It was created on 27 June 1861 for the lawyer and Liberal politician Sir Richard Bethell on his appointment as Lord Chancellor, a post he held until 1865.

The title descended in the direct line until the death of his great-great-grandson, the fourth baron (who succeeded his grandfather), in 1961. The fourth baron was succeeded by his younger brother, the fifth baron. He was equerry to Prince Henry, Duke of Gloucester from 1947 to 1949 and also served as deputy lieutenant of North Yorkshire in 1973. As of 2016 the title is held by his son, the sixth baron, who succeeded in 2001.

== Barons Westbury (1861) ==
- Richard Bethell, 1st Baron Westbury (30 June 1800 – 24 July 1873)
- Richard Augustus Bethell, 2nd Baron Westbury (11 March 1830 – 28 March 1875)
- Richard Luttrell Pilkington Bethell, 3rd Baron Westbury (25 April 1852 – 20 February 1930). He jumped out of the bedroom window of his seventh floor St James's apartment after a long period of illness. He left a note that read: "I really cannot stand any more horrors and hardly see what good I am going to do here, so I am making my exit." His death was ruled "suicide while of unsound mind." His son Captain The Hon. Richard Bethell was found smothered to death at a Mayfair club.
- Richard Morland Tollemache Bethell, 4th Baron Westbury (9 October 1914 – 26 June 1961) He co-authored a cookery book on Italian cooking, With Gusto and Relish, published in 1957. Lord Westbury spent the latter part of his life mainly in Rome, Italy. He never married and his younger brother, David Allan Bethell, succeeded to the Westbury title in 1961.
- David Allan Bethell, 5th Baron Westbury (1922–2001), husband of Ursula James
- Richard Nicholas Bethell, 6th Baron Westbury (b. 1950)

The heir apparent is the present holder's son Hon. Richard Alexander David Bethell (b. 1986)
The next heir-in-line is his son Richard Maximilian Ferdinand Bethell (b. 2023)
