= East Langdon =

Village in Kent, England

Coordinates: 51.1647°N 1.3355°E

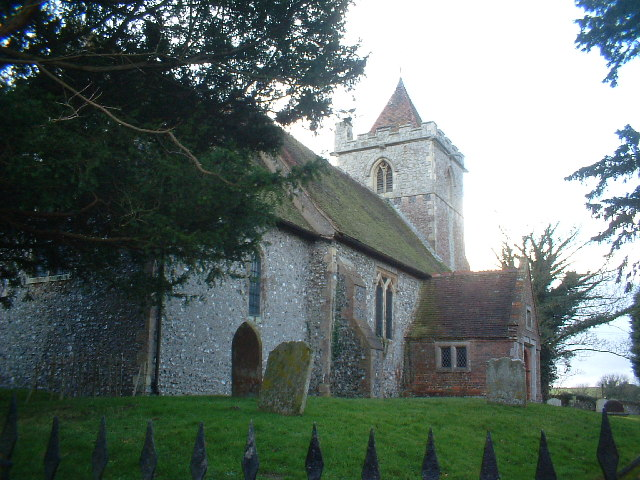
- St Augustine's Church

- Location within Kent
- OS grid reference: TR332458
- Civil parish: Langdon
- District: Dover
- Shire county: Kent
- Region: South East
- Country: England
- Sovereign state: United Kingdom
- Post town: Dover
- Postcode district: CT15
- Dialling code: 01304
- Police: Kent
- Fire: Kent
- Ambulance: South East Coast
- UK Parliament: Dover

East Langdon is a village and former civil parish, now in the parish of Langdon, in the Dover district of Kent, England. It is 3 miles (5 km) northeast from Dover town. In 1961 the parish had a population of 305. On 1 April 1963 the parish was abolished to form "Langdon".

East Langdon was mentioned in the Domesday Book. The word 'Langdon' is "long hill" in Old English. The first reference to the village, in 861, mentions one Langandune, but a reference in 1291 mentions Estlangedoun and Westlangedone, the latter village of West Langdon being located about 1 mile (1.6 km) to the northwest.

The church is dedicated to Saint Augustine. The remains of Langdon Abbey are nearby.
