= West Langdon =

Village in Kent, England

Coordinates: 51.1789°N 1.3214°E

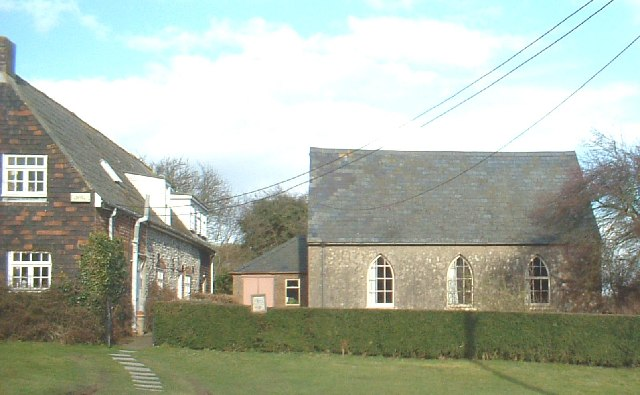
- A church in West Langdon

- Location within Kent
- OS grid reference: TR322474
- Civil parish: Langdon
- District: Dover
- Shire county: Kent
- Region: South East
- Country: England
- Sovereign state: United Kingdom
- Post town: Dover
- Postcode district: CT15
- Dialling code: 01304
- Police: Kent
- Fire: Kent
- Ambulance: South East Coast
- UK Parliament: Dover and Deal

West Langdon is a village and former civil parish, now in the parish of Langdon, in the Dover district of Kent, England. It is located five miles north of Dover town. In 1961 the parish had a population of 68. On 1 April 1963 the parish was abolished and merged with East Langdon to form "Langdon".

The name Langdon derives from an Old English word meaning long hill. The first known written reference dates to 861 AD, mentioning one Langandune, but around 1200 AD there was a reference to Estlangedoun (East Langdon, about one mile to the south east) and Westlangedone.

The Church is dedicated to Saint Mary. The remains of Langdon Abbey are nearby.
