= Langdon, Kent =

Civil parish in Kent, England

Coordinates: 51.175°N 1.329°E

Langdon
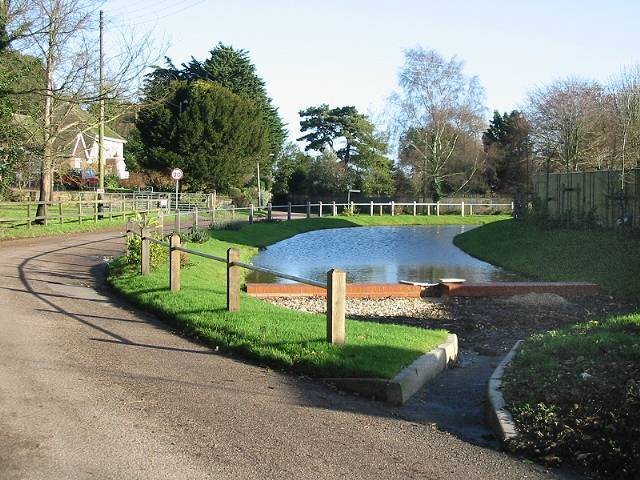
- Church Lane, East Langdon

- Location within Kent
- Population: 558 (2011)
- Civil parish: Langdon
- District: Dover
- Shire county: Kent
- Region: South East
- Country: England
- Sovereign state: United Kingdom
- Post town: Dover
- Postcode district: CT15
- Dialling code: 01304
- Police: Kent
- Fire: Kent
- Ambulance: South East Coast

Langdon is a civil parish in the Dover district of Kent, England, and contains the villages of East Langdon and West Langdon, and the hamlets of Martin and Martin Mill. Langdon was the site of Langdon Abbey which was dissolved in 1535.

== History ==
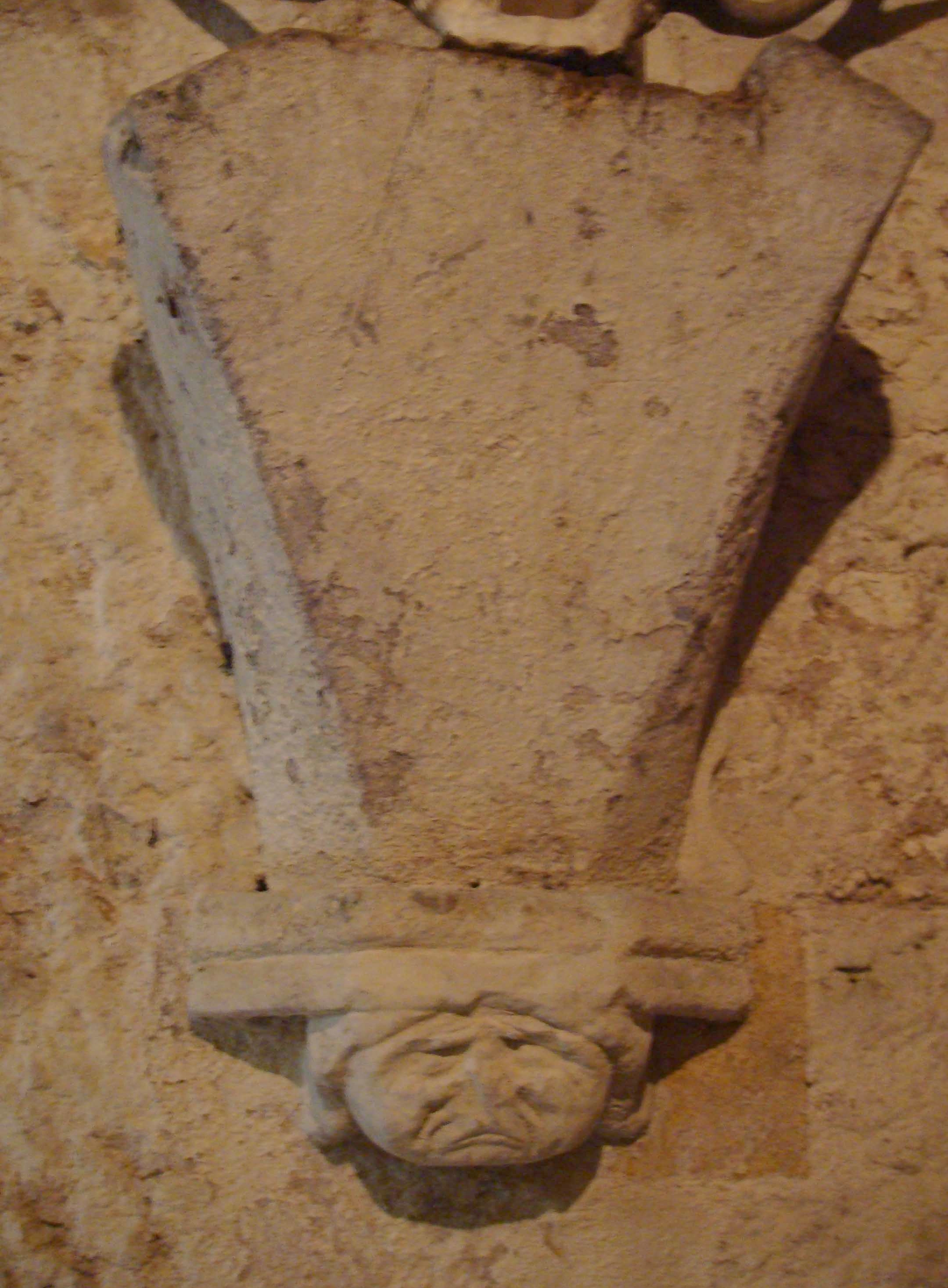
Carved stone corbel from monastic cellars of Langdon Abbey

The word Langdon comes from the original Old English meaning, 'Long Down' or 'Long Hill'. The name 'Langdon' is an Anglo-Saxon origin and one of the oldest names recorded. It is a common surname, as well as a locational name from places in Devon, Dorset, Warwickshire, Essex and Kent. However, East and West Langdon in Kent is the earliest recorded use of the place name Langdon, at the time of the 861 Saxon Charters the place was recorded as "Langandune". The original meaning of Langdon suggests that the parish lies along a 'long hill' or 'long down' between Deal and Whitfield.

The remains of the historical Langdon Abbey lie between West Langdon and East Langdon. The abbey was founded in 1198 by Sir William de Auberville of Westenhanger and dissolved in 1535. Historic England describes the Premonstratensian abbey remains as "... abbey buildings survive partly as ruins incorporated within a later house, Listed Grade II*, and also within the Grade II Listed, north eastern wall of a 19th-century agricultural barn. Elsewhere, the abbey survives in buried form and as earthworks."

In the 1870s John Marius Wilson described East Langdon as a village and its own parish "in Dover district, Kent... near the Deal and Dover railway, 3½ miles NNE of Dover. The parish contains also the hamlet of Marten; and its post-town is Dover. Acres, 1,065. Real property, £2,228. Pop., 362. Houses, 72. The property is divided among a few. The living is a rectory in the diocese of Canterbury. Value, £126. * Patron, the Earl of Guilford. The church comprises nave, small aisle, and chancel."

In 19th- and early 20th-century directories, today's Langdon comprised two parishes: East Langdon and West Langdon. East Langdon parish included the hamlet of Martin, and Martin Mill station on the Dover and Deal Railway. In 1882 and 1913 both parishes were part of the Union—poor relief and joint parish workhouse provision set up under the Poor Law Amendment Act 1834—county court and county police district of Dover, and in part of the Bewborough and Cornilo hundred, the Lathe of St. Augustine (county subdivision), the rural deanery of Sandwich, and the Archdeaconry and diocese of Canterbury.

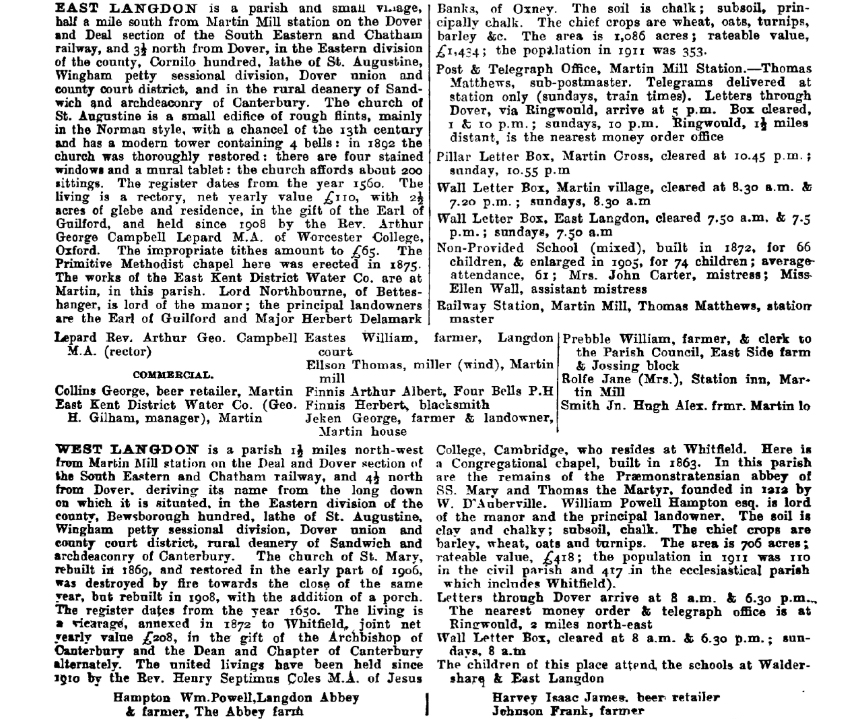
Langdon, East and West, in Kelly's Directory of Kent 1913 p.419. See also 1882.

St Augustine's Church at East Langdon, is described as of Early English style with Norman remains, and a "small unpretending structure of rough flints" comprising chancel, nave, south aisle, a north porch, and a western wooden turret with four bells. The south aisle of the nave extends partly through to the south of the chancel, with a separating arch repeating that of the chancel arch, both arches originally containing an Early English rood screen. Kelly's particularly highlighted the crimson velvet pulpit cloth, "richly embroidered, with a representation of the Annunciation to the Virgin, accompanied by various elegant devices and scrolls". St Mary's Church at West Langdon was rebuilt in 1869 to the Early English style and restored in 1906, and comprises a chancel and nave, with seating at the time for about 100. The register for St Augustine's dates to 1560, that of St Mary's, 1650. The living for St Augustine's was a rectory, and included a residence, in the gift of Dudley Francis North, 7th Earl of Guilford in 1882 until 1885 and Frederick George North, 8th Earl, from then until at least 1913; that of St Mary's a vicarage, united with that at Whitfield from 1872, and under the rectory of Waldershare, and in the gift of the Archbishop and the Dean and Chapter of Canterbury. A Primitive Methodist chapel, built in 1875, also existed at East Langdon from 1882 to at least 1913. A National School was built at East Langdon in 1872 for 66 children, enlarged in 1905 for 74, and by 1913 had become a mixed non-provided school—defined by the 1902 Education Act as church schools not funded by rates—with a schoolmistress and her assistant, with an average attendance of 61. Children at West Langdon attended school at East Langdon and Waldershare. In 1913 there was a Post and Telegraph Office at Martin Mill Station, run by a sub-postmaster; telegrams for the parish were delivered only to the station. Letters to East and West Langdon were routed through Dover, and then through Ringwould which was the nearest money order office.

The lord of the manor of East Langdon was Sir Walter Charles James, 1st Baron Northbourne of Betteshanger in 1882 and Walter James, 2nd Baron in 1913; that of West Langdon in 1882, a Benjamin James Taylor, and in 1913 a William Powell Hampton who was also the principal landowner. The three principal landowners of East Langdon in 1882 included the Earl of Guilford. The Earl remained a principal landowner in 1913, along with Major Herbert Delamar Banks, of Oxney. Land area of East Langdon was just over 1,046 acres (423 hectares) in 1882, and 1,086 acres (439 hectares) in 1913, that of West Langdon, just over 690 acres (280 hectares) in 1882 and 706 acres (286 hectares) in 1913. The land of both parishes was of clay and chalk, over a subsoil of chalk, on which was grown wheat, oats, turnips and barley. Population of East Langdon in 1881 was 307, that of West Langdon in 1881 and 1913, 105. The population of the ecclesiastical parish of West Langdon, which was combined with Whitfield, was 417 in 1913.

Parish population for East Langdon in 1881 was 307 and in 1911, 353; that for West Langdon in 1881 was 105 and in 1911, 110. Recorded occupations and trades in 1882 included, for East Langdon, six farmers, a miller, carpenter, blacksmith, wheelwright, bricklayer, shopkeeper, a beer retailer, and the licensee of the Four Bells public house. Also resident was the parish vestry clerk, a collector of rates, the station master of Martin Mill railway station, and the schoolmistress for the parish' National School. At West Langdon there were recorded the parish clerk, two farmers, a shoemaker, and a beer retailer. By 1913 at West Langdon a shoemaker was not listed. East Langdon in 1913 showed four farmers, one of whom was a landowner, and another the clerk to the civil parish council. A beer retailer and a blacksmith was still listed in 1913, the miller was at a windmill, there was the licensee of the Four Bells, a licensee of the Station Inn at Martin Mill, and a manager of the East Kent District Water Company at Martin.

== Demography ==
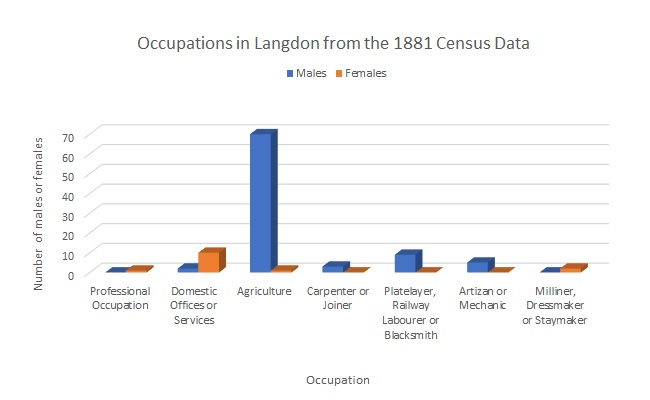
Occupations of males and females in Langdon, 1881.

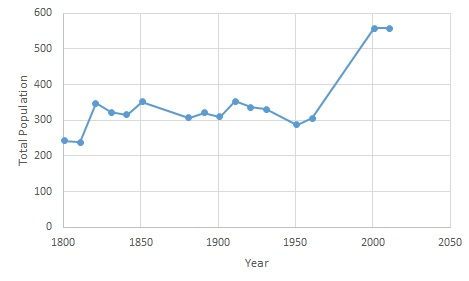
Total population time series of Langdon, Kent, 1801-2011.

The population time series of Langdon from 1801 to 2011 shows how the population fluctuated over the years between 1801 and 1961. In more recent years the population appears to have levelled off at almost 560 in 2001 and 2011.

Maps of 19th-century Langdon show that the area was mainly rural. In 1881 the total population of Langdon was 307. At the time 70 people, mainly male, were working in the predominant occupation of agriculture. Other occupations for men at this time included carpentry, mechanics, plate-laying, blacksmithing, labouring on the railway, and careers in the navy. Women were mainly engaged in domestic positions and services, such as indoor servants and charwomen, or working for a washing and bathing service; a total of 10 females were working in this type of employment.

The 2011 census recorded 281 males and 277 females, and 424 residents aged 16–74 who were employed. The number of women engaging in economic activity has significantly increased since 1881, in 2011 a total of 216 women were in employment. The number of males engaging in economic activity in 2011 was 208, employment between males and females in Langdon is now very similar, compared to the 1881 statistics where economic activity was mainly dominated by males.

== Amenities ==
Langdon is a rural civil parish 4.6 miles north-east of Dover, and contains the villages of East Langdon and West Langdon, and the hamlets of Martin, and Martin Mill; parish population includes these settlements.

There is a local post office in East Langdon, with services including mail, identity provision and licences, travel, and finances. The village has a small primary school called Langdon Primary School, in the 2016 Ofsted report there was a total of 78 pupils.

A local bus serves the parish, with bus stops at East Langdon, Martin and Martin Mill, with connections to Dover and Deal. The local train station at Martin Mill provides Southeastern Trains connections to Dover and St Pancras International.

== Churches ==
=== St Augustine's Church ===
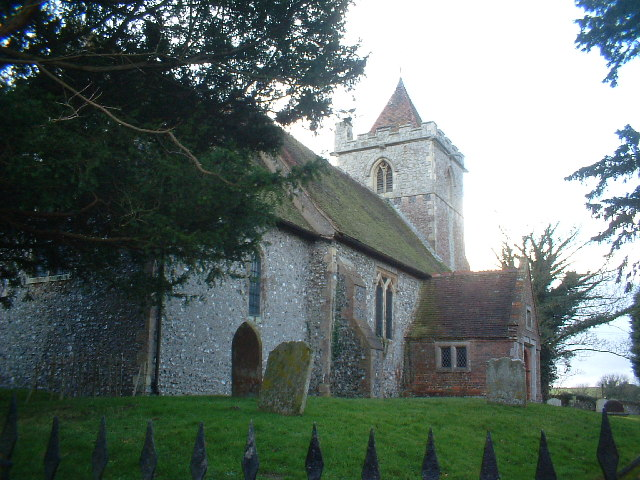
St Augustine's Church, East Langdon

St Augustine's, a medieval church in East Langdon, is dedicated to Saint Augustine, and is a Grade II listed building. It was completed in the 12th century by the Normans, with later additions including and a north porch added between the 14th and 16th centuries. In the late 19th century, Victorian architect Loftus Brock restored parts of the church, mainly the tower.

John E Vigar in his web site blog describes St Augustine's Church as "a little-visited gem... rescued from neglect in the late nineteenth century", with chancel stained glass by Powell, an unusual font, a royal arms, and "what is probably the best hourglass stand in Kent".

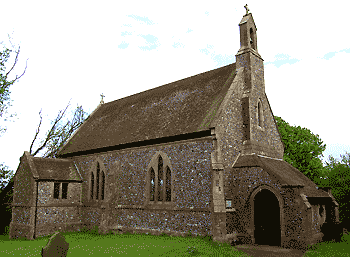
St Mary's Church, West Langdon

The 1851 census details on St Augustine's church record that morning service attendance was 151 people with a total seating capacity of 121. There was a morning service but none in the afternoon or evening.

=== St Mary the Virgin's Church ===
St Mary's in West Langdon is dedicated to Saint Mary the Virgin. It is said that the church was built by Monks in the early 12th century, near the site of Langdon Abbey. However, in the 16th century when Langdon Abbey was dissolved, this led to the church being neglected and in need of restoration. Attempts were made to repair the church by Sir Thomas Peyton of Knowlton Court in 1660.

=== Memorials ===
Both St Augustine's and St Mary's Church have war memorials in memory of those from the parish who lost their lives fighting in the First and Second World Wars; those who lost their lives during the First is higher than those in the Second.
