= Langdon Abbey =

Abbey in Kent, England from c. 1192 to 1535

Coordinates: 51°10′25″N 1°19′49″E

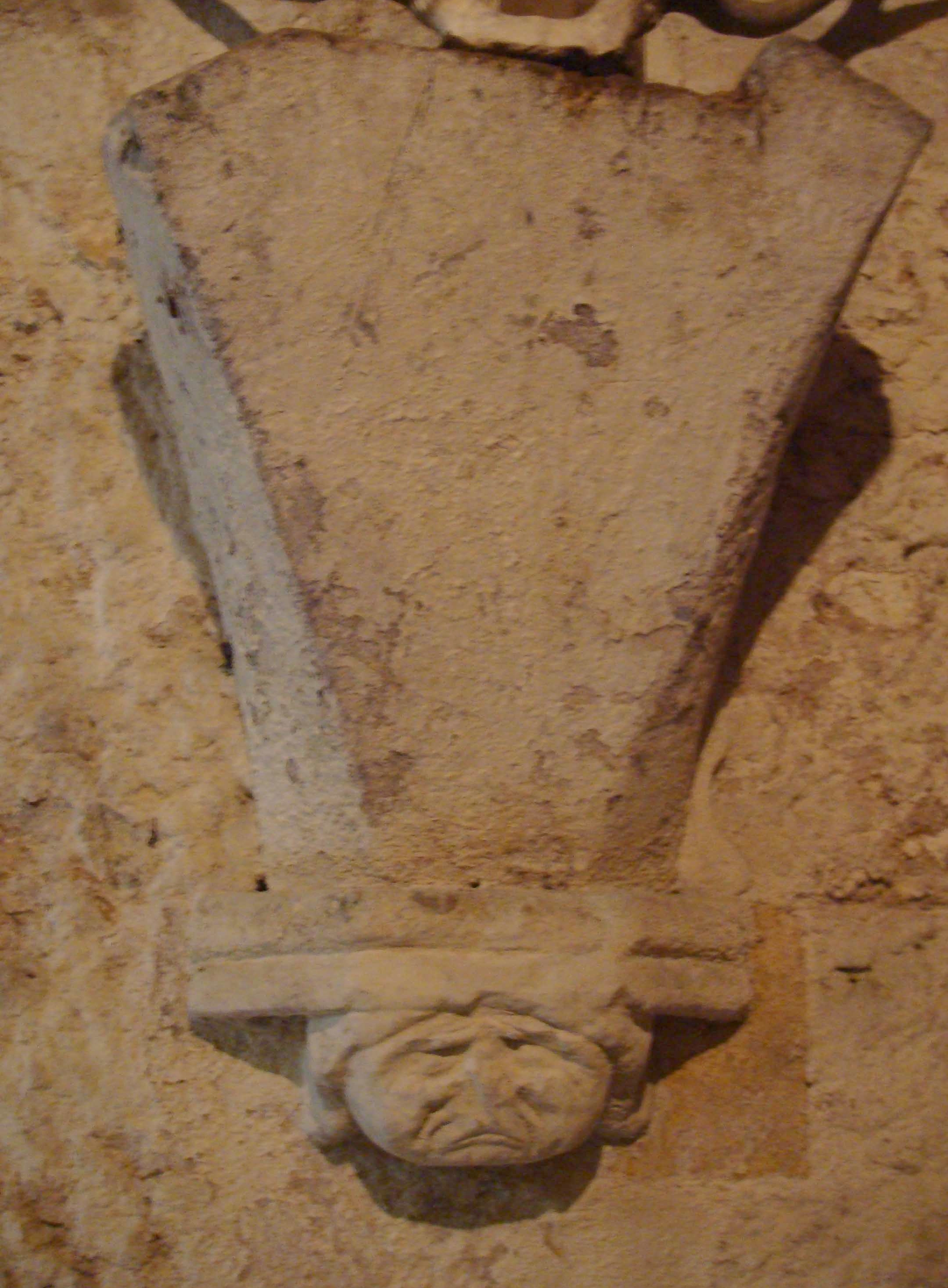
- Carved stone corbel, part of the remains of the monastic cellars at Langdon Abbey
- Interactive map of Langdon Abbey

Monastery information
- Order: Premonstratensian
- Established: circa 1192
- Disestablished: 1535
- Dedication: the Blessed Virgin Mary and St Thomas the Martyr

People
- Founder: Sir William de Auberville
- Important associated figures: Edward II

Site
- Location: West Langdon, Kent, England
- Visible remains: Monastic cellars and 17th-century ice house
- Public access: No

Langdon Abbey (grid reference TR329468) was a Premonstratensian abbey near West Langdon, Kent, founded in about 1192 and dissolved in 1535, reportedly the first religious house to be dissolved by Henry VIII. The visible remains of the abbey are now confined to the extensive cellaring below the 16th-century house that occupies its site and small remains of a 17th-century ice house.

== Foundation ==
Langdon Abbey was founded in about 1192 by William de Auberville (the elder) of Westenhanger, Kent (son of Hugh de Auberville), with the assent of his wife Matilda (Maud), daughter of Ranulf de Glanville (who died at the Siege of Acre in 1190), Chief Justiciar of England to King Henry II. William de Auberville was a knight in duty to Simon de Avranches. He was also a King's Justiciar, had assisted at the foundation of the Premonstratensian abbey of Leiston, Suffolk, by his father-in-law in 1182, and was a patron of Ranulf's religious foundation at Butley Priory, Suffolk, of 1171. Langdon Abbey was founded as a daughter house of Leiston Abbey, under the hand of Robert, abbot of Leiston, and was dedicated to the Blessed Virgin Mary and St Thomas the Martyr. Sir William annexed the church of St. Mary in Walmer to the abbey, in perpetual alms, and the church remained with the abbey until its dissolution.

Patronage of Langdon descended to Nicholas de Crioll (the younger), son of William's great-granddaughter Joan de Auberville and her husband Nicholas de Crioll (the elder).

== Royal favour ==
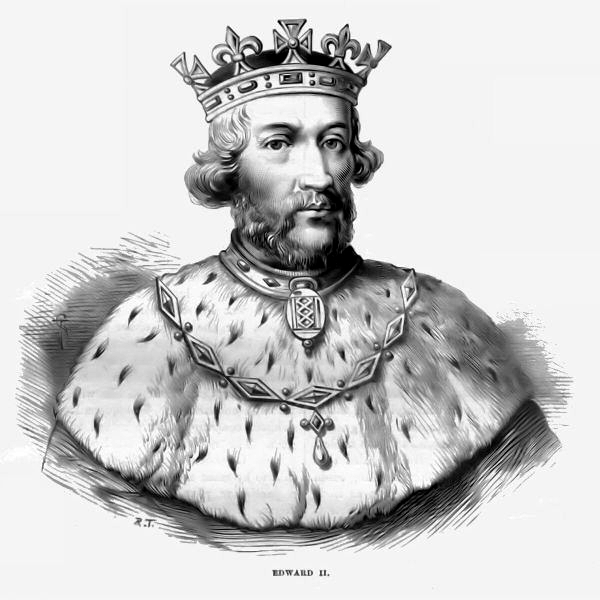
Edward II

In 1325 Edward II recuperated at the abbey, having been taken ill on the road to Dover.

The Abbot and Convent of Langedon were granted a licence to crenellate in 1348.

In 1491 it was reported that Langdon had 300 acres (121 hectares) of grain and a very good supply of animals.

== Dissolution ==
In 1535 the abbey was reputedly the first religious house to be dissolved by Henry VIII and had, at that time, an annual revenue estimated at £56. Dr. Leyton, the commissioner who carried out the visitation of the abbey, sent the following report to Cromwell on his arrest of the abbot and his mistress:

Please it your goodness to understand that on Friday, the 22nd of October, I rode back with speed to take an inventory of Folkstone, and from thence I went to Langden. Whereat immediately descending from my horse, I sent Bartlett, your servant, with all my servants, to circumspect the abbey, and surely to keep all back-doors and starting-holes. I myself went alone to the abbot's lodging, joining upon the fields and wood, even like a cony clapper, full of starting-holes. [I was] a good space knocking at the abbot's door; nec vox nec sensus apparuit, saving the abbot's little dog that within his door fast locked bayed and barked. I found a short poleaxe standing behind the door, and with it I dashed the abbot's door in pieces, ictu oculi, and set one of my men to keep that door; and about the house I go, with that poleaxe in my hand, ne forte, for the abbot is a dangerous desperate knave, and a hardy. But for a conclusion, his gentlewoman bestirred her stumps towards her starting-holes; and then Bartlett, watching the pursuit, took the tender damoisel; and, after I had examined her, [brought her] to Dover to the mayor, to set her in some cage or prison for eight days; and I brought holy father abbot to Canterbury, and here in Christchurch I will leave him in prison.

== Later history ==
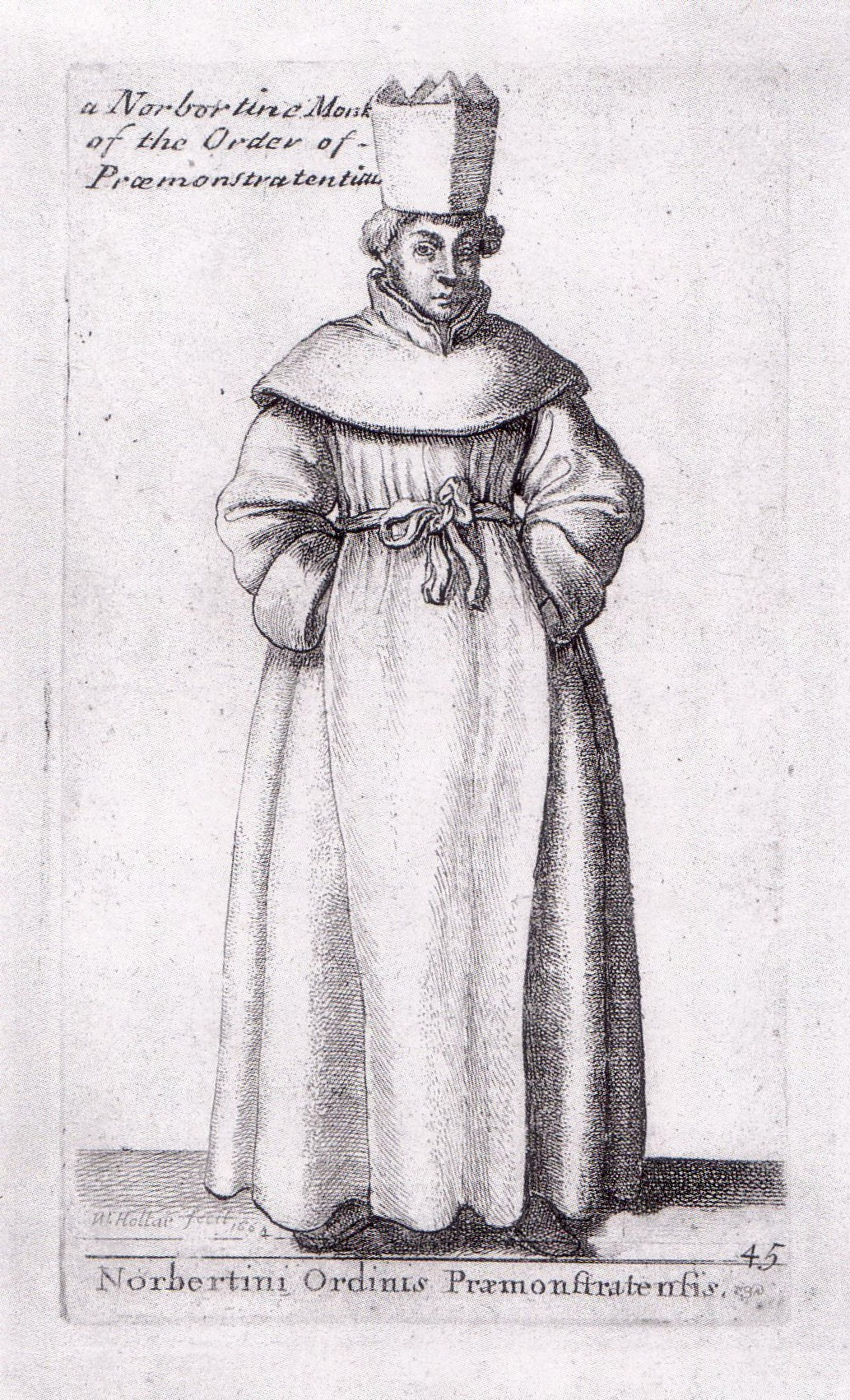
A canon in Premonstratensian habit

The fee simple ('fief') of the manor was acquired by John Master, who died in 1588. His son, James Master (who died in 1631, aged 84) was described as "Primo de Sandwich, postea de East Langden, ubi edificavit mansionem". James Master's eldest son, Sir Edward Master, was High Sheriff of Kent in 1639.

The site of the abbey itself was occupied by a farmhouse, parts of which date back to the 16th century. The monks’ cellar (retaining its original arches) remains in place underneath the house. In 1828, it was reported that the farmhouse "has been occupied many years by a respectable family of the name of Coleman", and the returns from the 1881 census show that one Richard Coleman remained a substantial farmer at Langdon as at that date.

== Gallery ==
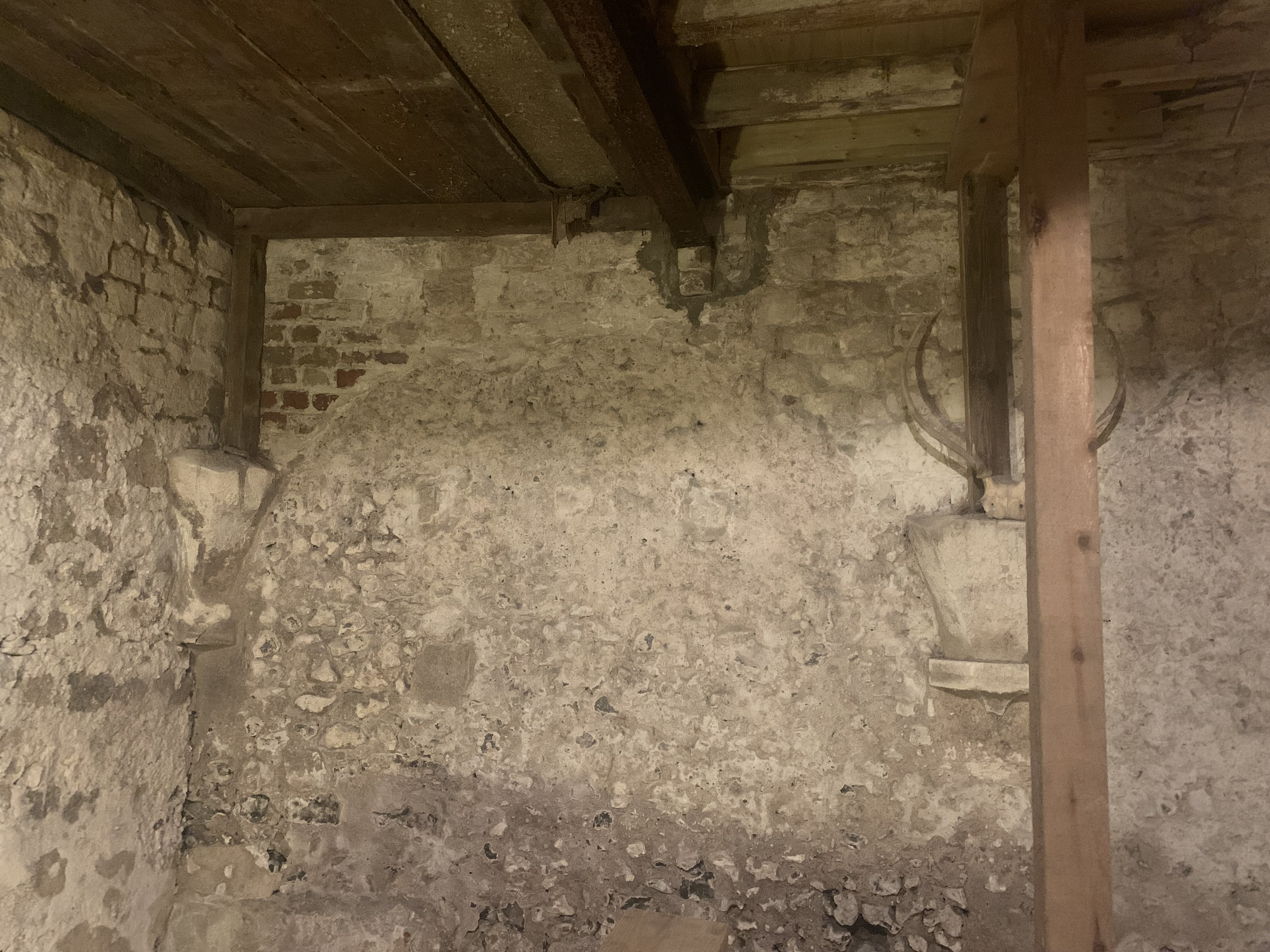
Monastic cellars at Langdon Abbey
