= List of Muslim philosophers =

Muslim philosophers both profess Islam and engage in a style of philosophy situated within the structure of the Arabic language and Islam, though not necessarily concerned with religious issues. The sayings of the companions of Muhammad contained little philosophical discussion. (Note: Only Ali's Nahj al-Balagha, is traditionally considered to contain both religious and philosophical thought.) In the eighth century, extensive contact with the Byzantine Empire led to a drive to translate philosophical works of Ancient Greek Philosophy (especially the texts of Aristotle) into Arabic.

The ninth-century Al-Kindi is considered the founder of Islamic peripatetic philosophy (800 CE – 1200 CE). The tenth-century philosopher al-Farabi contributed significantly to the introduction of Greek and Roman philosophical works into Muslim philosophical discourse and established many of the themes that would occupy Islamic philosophy for the next centuries; in his broad-ranging work, his work on logic stands out particularly. In the eleventh century, Ibn Sina, one of the greatest Muslim philosophers ever, developed his own unique school of philosophy known as Avicennism which had strong Aristotelian and Neoplatonist roots. Al-Ghazali, a famous Muslim philosopher and theologian, took the approach to resolving apparent contradictions between reason and revelation. He understood the importance of philosophy and developed a complex response that rejected and condemned some of its teachings, while it also allowed him to accept and apply others. It was al-Ghazali's acceptance of demonstration (apodeixis) that led to a much more refined and precise discourse on epistemology and a flowering of Aristotelian logic and metaphysics in Muslim theological circles. Averroes, the last notable Muslim peripatetic philosopher, defended the use of Aristotelian philosophy against this charge; his extensive works include noteworthy commentaries on Aristotle. In the twelfth century, the philosophy of illumination was founded by Shahab al-Din Suhrawardi. Although philosophy in its traditional Aristotelian form fell out of favor in much of the Arab world after the twelfth century, forms of mystical philosophy became more prominent.

After Averroes, a vivid peripatetic philosophical school persisted in the eastern Muslim world during the Safavid Empire which scholars have termed as the School of Isfahan. It was founded by the Shia philosopher Mir Damad and developed further by Mulla Sadra and others.

== Classical Period (650–1250 CE) ==
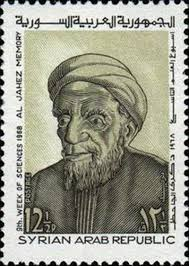
al-Jahiz

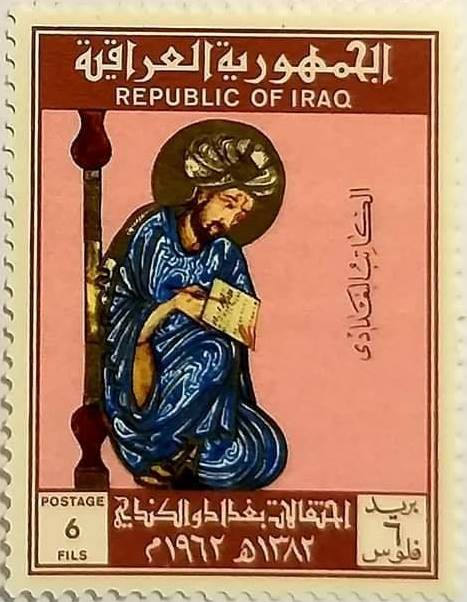
al-Kindi

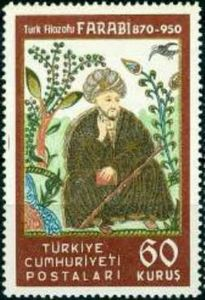
al-Farabi

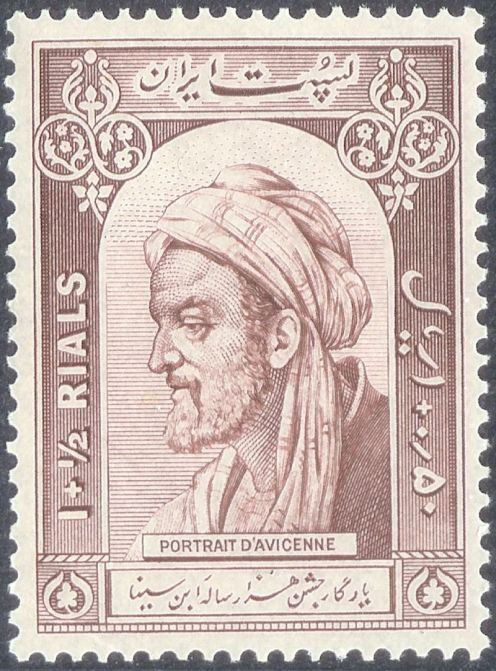
Ibn Sina (Avicenna)

- Ja'far al-Sadiq (c.702–765)
- Al-Fadl ibn Naubakht (fl. 8th century)
- Rabia Basri (714–801)
- Jabir ibn Hayyan (721–815)
- Abu al-Hudhayl al-'Allaf (752–841)
- Ibn al-Muqaffa' (d. 756/759)
- Bishr the Barefoot (767–841)
- Muhammad ibn Ibrahim al-Fazari (d. 806)
- Bishr ibn al-Muʿtamir (d. 825)
- Al-Jahiz (776–869)
- Al-Muhasibi (781–857)
- Abu Ma'shar al-Balkhi (787–886)
- Abu al-Abbas Iranshahri (b. 9th century)
- Abu Muhammad al-Hasan ibn Musa al-Nawbakhti (c. b. 9th century – c. 912–922)
- Al-Kindi (801–873)
- Bayazid Bastami (804–874)
- Abu Zayd al-Balkhi (850–934)
- Al-Hallaj (c.858–922)
- Dhu'l-Nun al-Misri (d. 859/862)
- Abu Bakr al-Razi (865–925)
- Al-Farabi (872–951)
- Ibn Masarra (883–931)
- Mundhir ibn Sa'id al-Balluti (887–966)
- Ahmad ibn al-Tayyib al-Sarakhsi (d. 899)
- Abu al-Abbas al-Lawkari (b. 10th century)
- Abu Sulayman Sijistani (c.912–c.985)
- Abu al-Hassan al-Amiri (913–992)
- Al-Jubba'i (d. 915)
- Abu Muhammad al-Hasan ibn Musa al-Nawbakhti (d. 922)
- Abu Hayyan al-Tawhidi (923–1023)
- Shahid Balkhi (d. 927)
- Abu Sulayman Sijistani (932–1000)
- Ibn Jinni (932–1002)
- Ibn Miskawayh (932–1030)
- Abu Hatim Ahmad ibn Hamdan al-Razi (d. 933)
- Abu Ya'qub al-Sijistani (930s–971)
- Ibn al-Khammar (b. 942)

Ibn Rushd (Averroes)

- Muhammad ibn Ahmad al-Nasafi (d. 945)
- Ibn Yunus (c.950–1009)
- Ibn al-Kattani (951–1029)
- Abu al-Hakam al-Kirmani (970–1066)
- Al-Ma'arri (973–1058)
- Ibn Sina (980–1037)
- Ibn Hazm (994–1064)
- Hamid al-Din al-Kirmani (996–1021)
- Ahmad ibn Ibrahim al-Naysaburi (996–1021)
- Al-Mu'ayyad fi'l-Din al-Shirazi (1000–1078)
- Nasir Khusraw(1004–1088)
- Nizam al-Mulk (1018–1092)
- Abul Hasan Hankari (1018–1093)
- Yusuf Balasaguni (c.1019–1077)
- Al-Mubashshir ibn Fatik (1019–1097)
- Ibn Hindu (d. 1032)
- Omar Khayyam (1048–1131)
- Abu al-Fadl ibn Hasdai (1050–1093)
- Hasan-i Sabbah (1050–1124)
- Ibn al-Sid al-Batalyawsi (1052–1127)
- Al-Ghazali (1058–1111)
- Abu Bakr al-Turtushi (1059 –1126)
- Bahmanyar (d. 1066)
- Abu as-Salt (c.1068–1134)
- Ibn Malka al-Baghdadi (1080–1165)
- Ibn Bajja (1085–1138)
- Muhammad al-Shahrastani (1086–1153)
- Ayn al-Quzat Hamadani (1098–1131)
- Ibn Zafar al-Siqilli (1104–1172)
- Ibn Tufayl (1105–1185)
- Ibn Rushd (1126–1198)
- Afzal al-Din Kermani (1135–1218)
- Al-Badi' al-Asturlabi (d. 1140)
- Zayn al-Din Omar Savaji (d. 1145)
- Najm al-Din Kubra (c.1145–c.1221)
- Fakhr al-Din al-Razi (1149–1209)
- Kamal al-Din ibn Yunus (1156–1242)
- Abd al-Latif al-Baghdadi (1162–1231)
- Ibn Tumlus (1164-1223)
- Ibn Arabi (1165–1240)
- Abu Jafar ibn Harun al-Turjali (d. 1180)
- Abdol Hamid Khosro Shahi (b. 1184)
- Afdal al-Din Kashani (d. 1213)
- Ahmad al-Buni (d. 1225)
- Al-Shahrazuri (b. 13th century)
- Awhad al-Din al-Razi (b. 13th century)

== Medieval Period (1250–1800 CE) ==
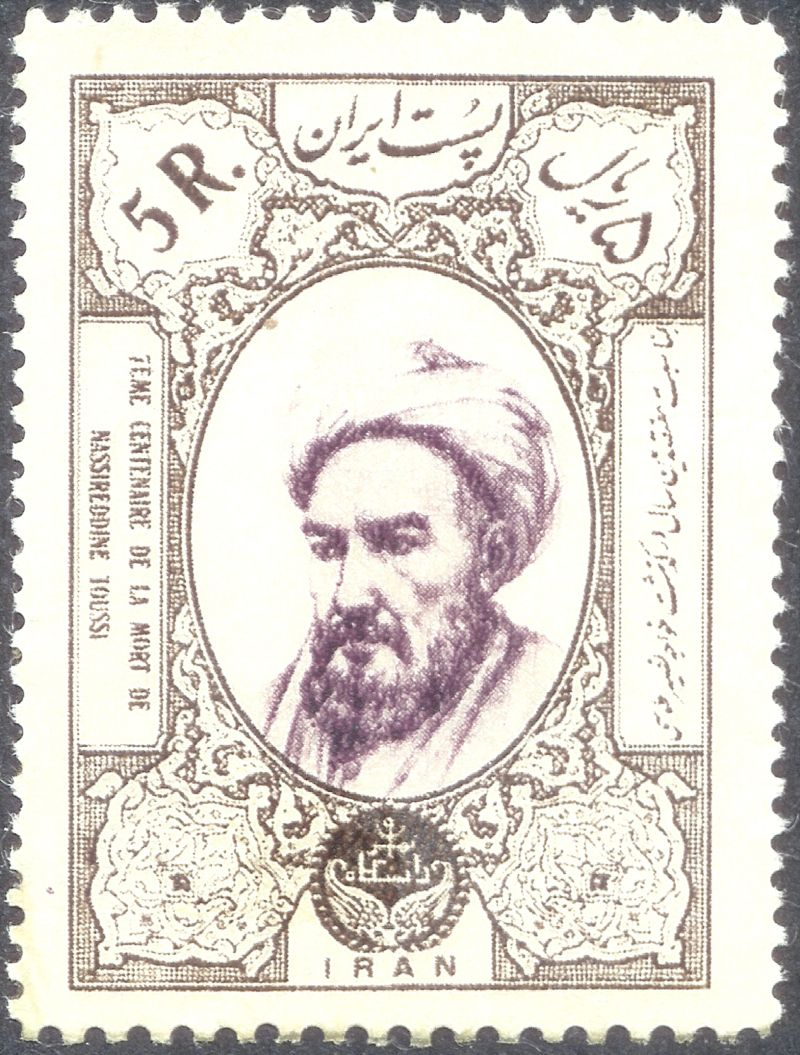
Nasir al-Din al-Tusi

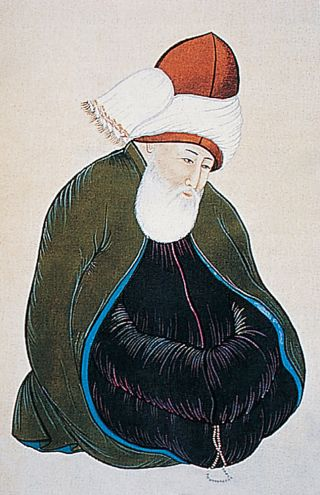
Rumi

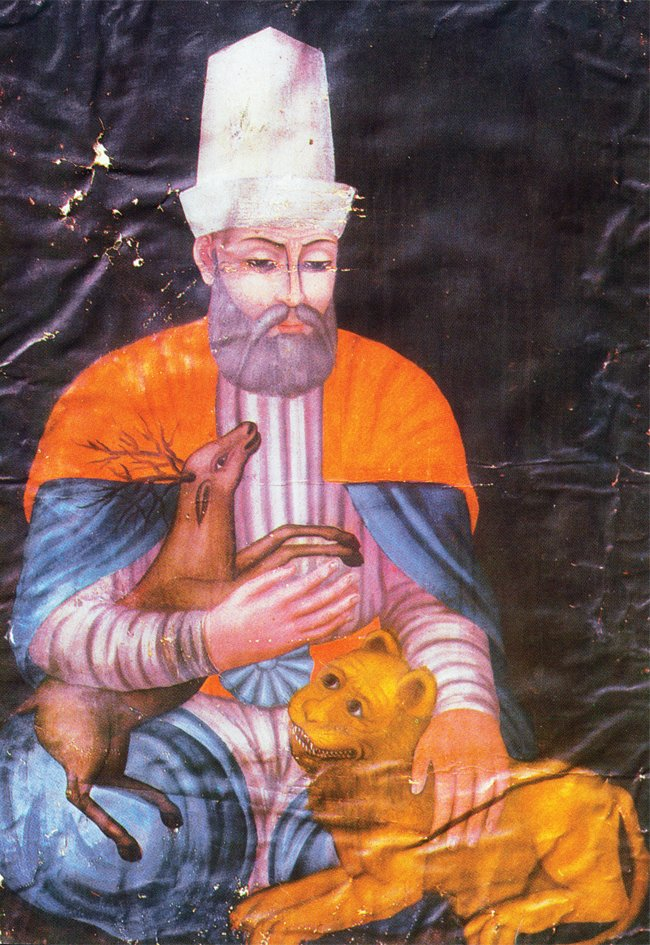
Haji Bektash

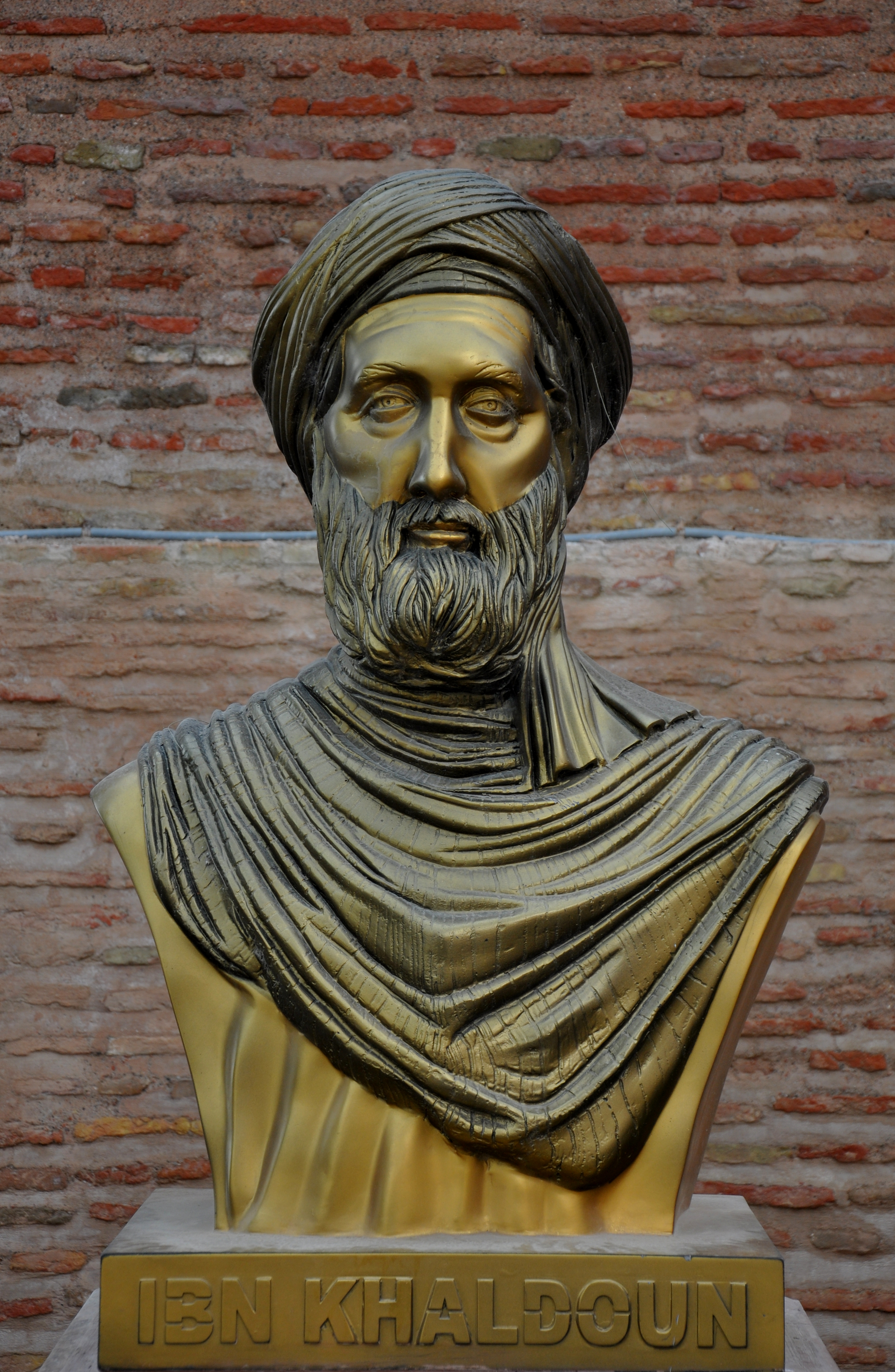
Ibn Khaldun

Mulla Sadra

- Ahi Evran (1169–1261)
- Afdal al-Din Khunaji (1194–1248)
- Siraj al-Din Urmavi (1198–1283)
- Nasir al-Din al-Tusi (1201–1274)
- Najm al-Din al-Qazwini al-Katibi (1204–1276)
- Rumi (1207–1273)
- Sadr al-Din al-Qunawi (1207–1274)
- Haji Bektash (1209–1271)
- Ibn al-Nafis (1210–1289)
- Fakhr al-Din Iraqi (1213–1289)
- Ibn Sab'in (1216–1271)
- Qutb al-Din al-Shirazi (1236–1311)
- Al-Bahrani (1238–1299)
- Al-Allama al-Hilli (1250–1325)
- Mirza Hashem Eshkevari (1250–1293)
- Shahab al-Din Suhrawardi (1255–1191)
- Athir al-Din al-Abhari (d. 1265)
- Sheikh Yusof Sarvestani (d. 1281)
- Adud al-Din al-Iji (1281–1356)
- Muhammad al-Abili (1282–1356)
- Al-Shahrazuri (d. 1288)
- Qutb al-Din Razi (1294–1364)
- Ibn al-Khatib (1313–1374)
- Haydar Amuli (1319–1385)
- Al-Taftazani (1322–1390)
- Ibn Khaldun (1332–1406)
- Abd al-Karim al-Jili (1365–1424)
- Nund Rishi (1377–1438)
- Jami (1414–1492)
- Sadr ad-Din Dashtaki (1425–1498)
- Jalal al-Din Davani (1426–1502)
- Darwish Muhammad (1443–1562)
- Muhammad Zahid Wakhshi (1448–1529)
- Qadi Husayn Maybudi (1449–1504)
- Ghyath al-Din Mansur Dashtaki (1461–1542)
- Shaykh Yaqub Sarfi Kashmiri (1521-1595)
- Mohammed Bagayogo (1523-1593)
- Baha al-Din al-Amili (1547–1621)
- Mir Damad (1561–1632)
- Mir Fendereski (1562–1640)
- Ahmad Sirhindi (1564–1624)
- Wang Daiyu (ca. 1570 – ca. 1660)
- Mulla Sadra (1571–1636)
- Nezam al-Din Ahmad Gilani (1585–1660s)
- Fathullah Shirazi (d. 1589)
- Mohsen Fayz Kashani (1598–1680)
- Hasan Lahiji (1621-1709)
- Sa'id Qomi (1639–1691)
- Ma Zhu (1640–1711)
- Muhammad Sadiq Ardestani (1644–1721)
- Sayyed Ahmad Alavi (d. 1650)
- Liu Zhi (c.1660–c.1739)
- Abd al-Razzaq Lahiji (d. 1662)
- Rajab Ali Tabrizi (d. 1670)
- Ali ibn Tayfur Bistami (fl. late 17th century)
- Mulla Muzaffar Hussain Kashani (b. 18th century)
- Shah Waliullah Dehlawi (1703–1762)
- Mulla Muhammad Mahdi Naraqi (1715–1795)
- Mulla Hamzah Gilani (d. 1721)
- Abdu Al Rahim Damavandi (1737–1757)
- Molla Naima Taleghani (d. 1738)
- Hassan al-Jabarti (d. 1774)

== Modern Period (1800 CE–present) ==
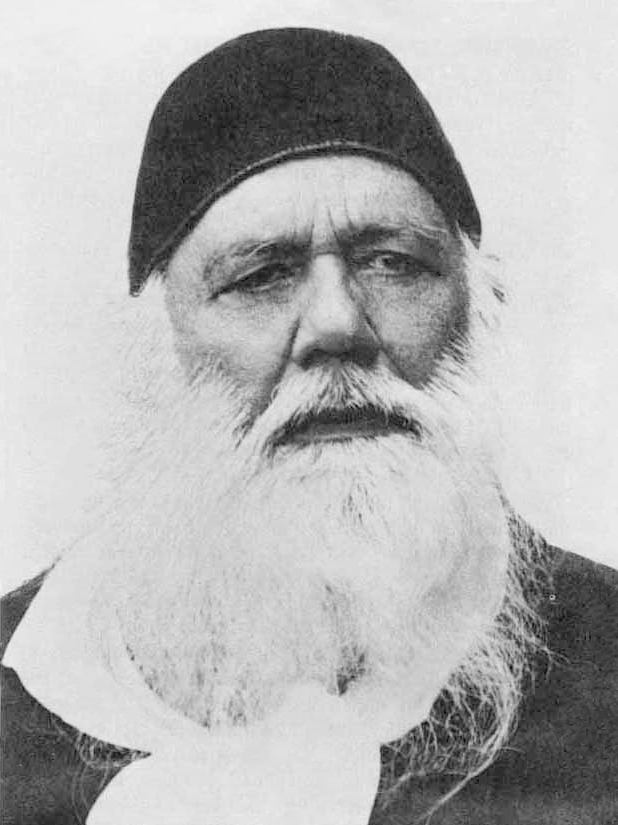
Syed Ahmed Khan

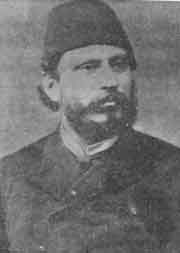
Jamal al-Din al-Afghani

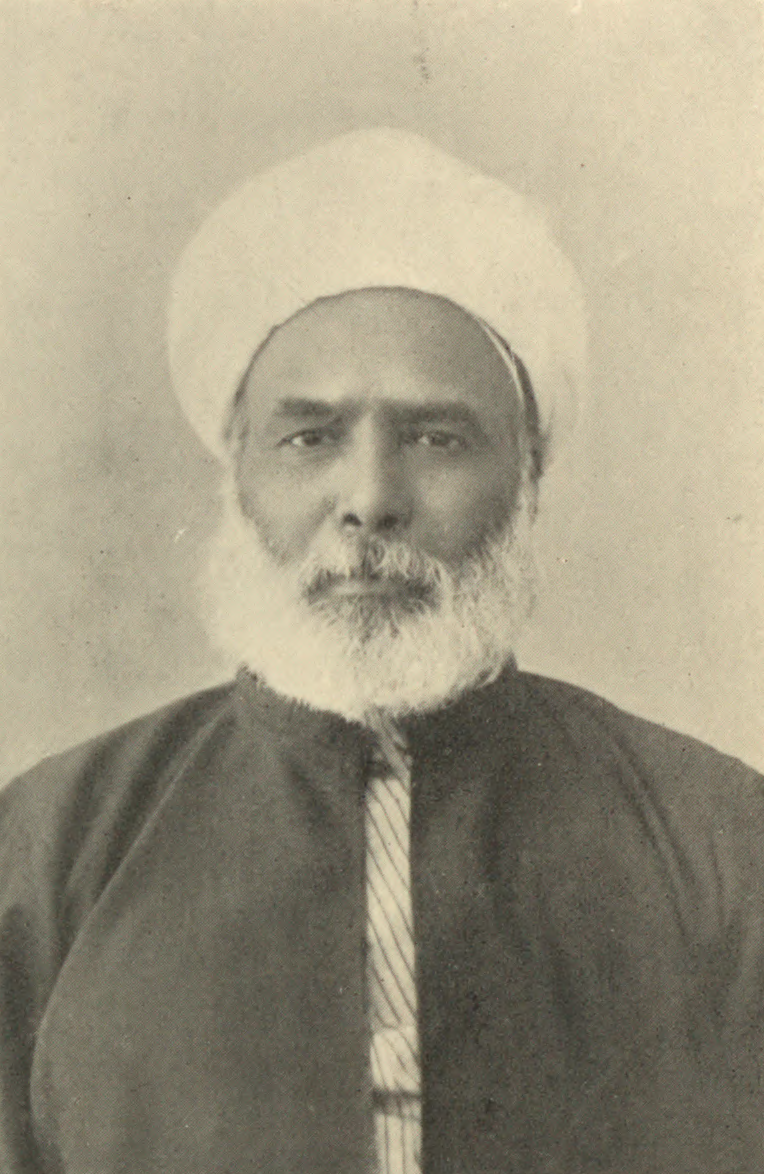
Muhammad Abduh

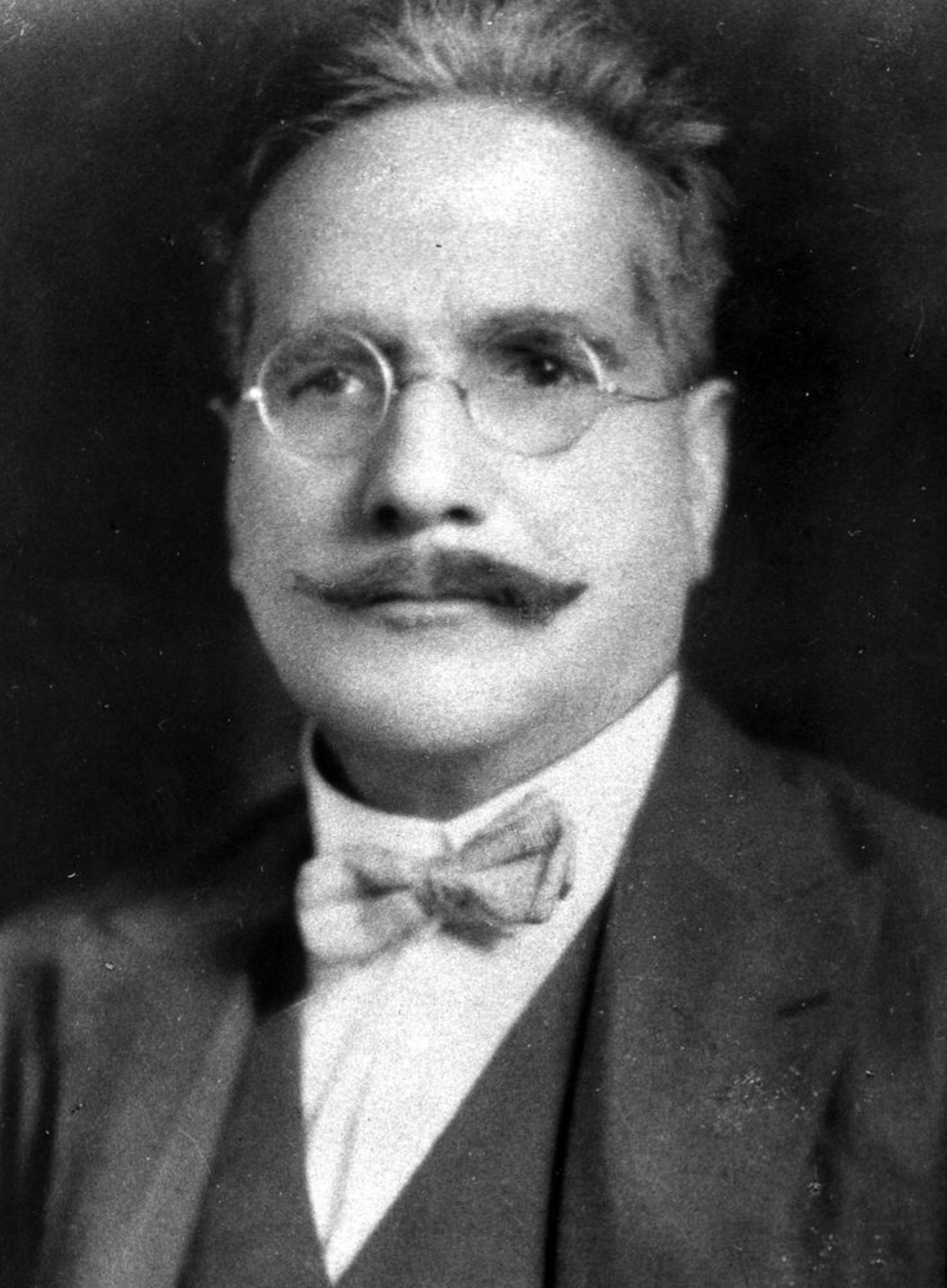
Muhammad Iqbal

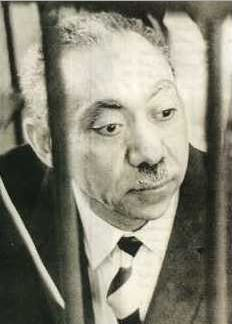
Sayyid Qutb

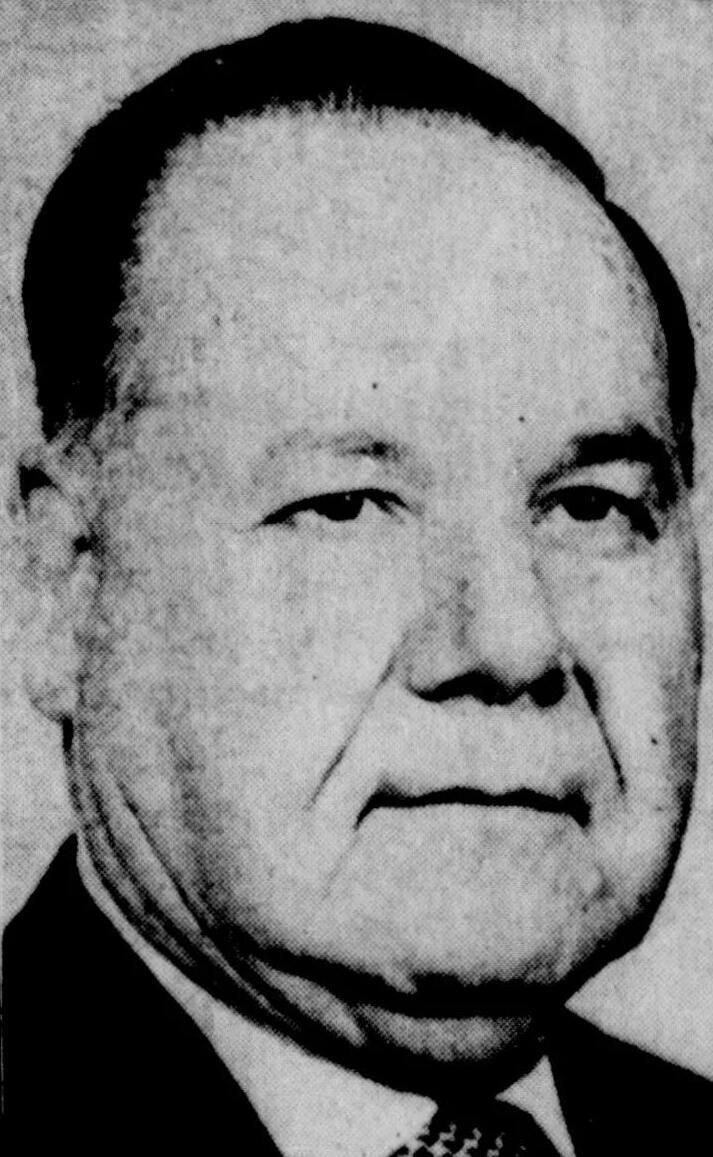
Ismail al-Faruqi

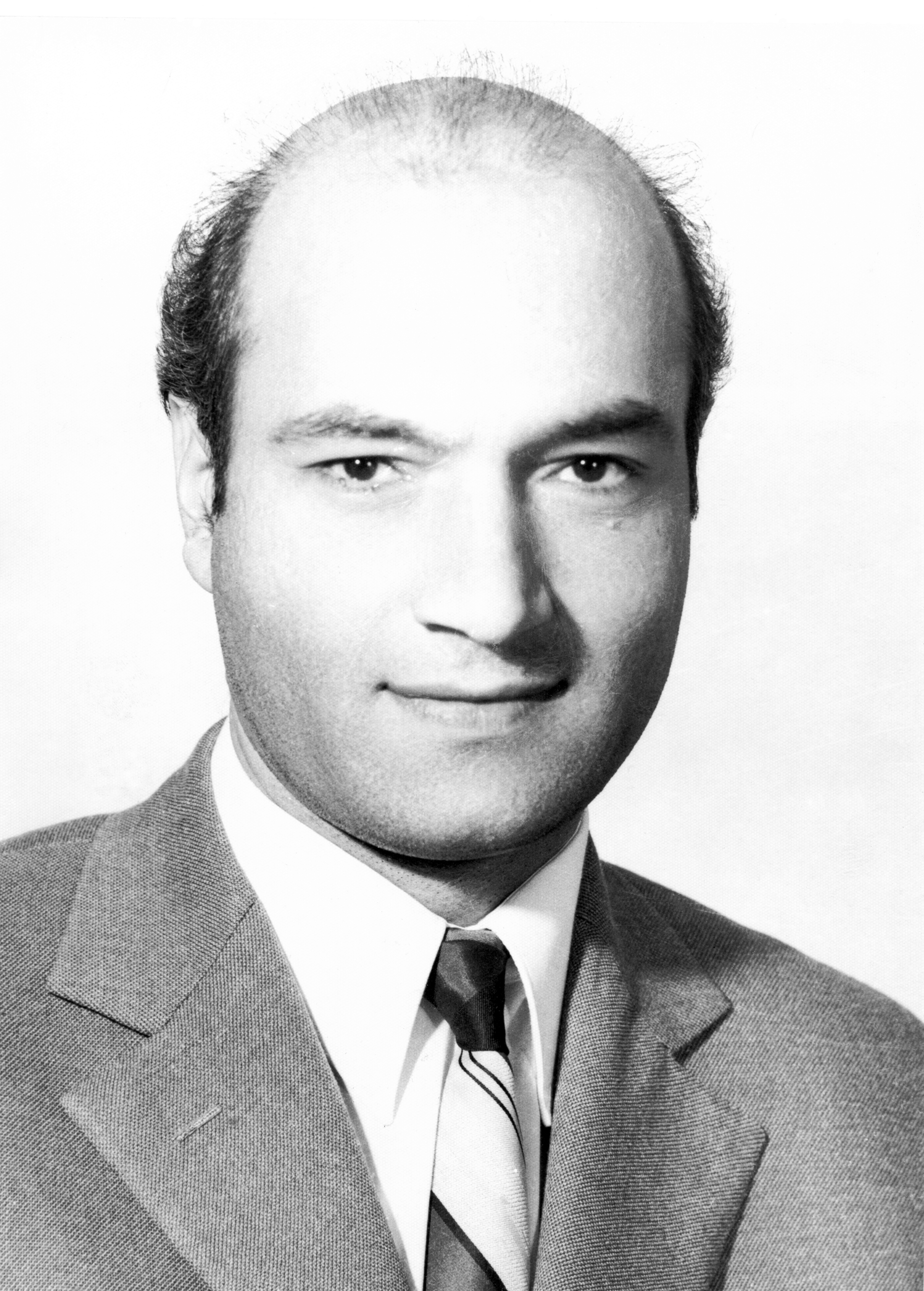
Ali Shariati

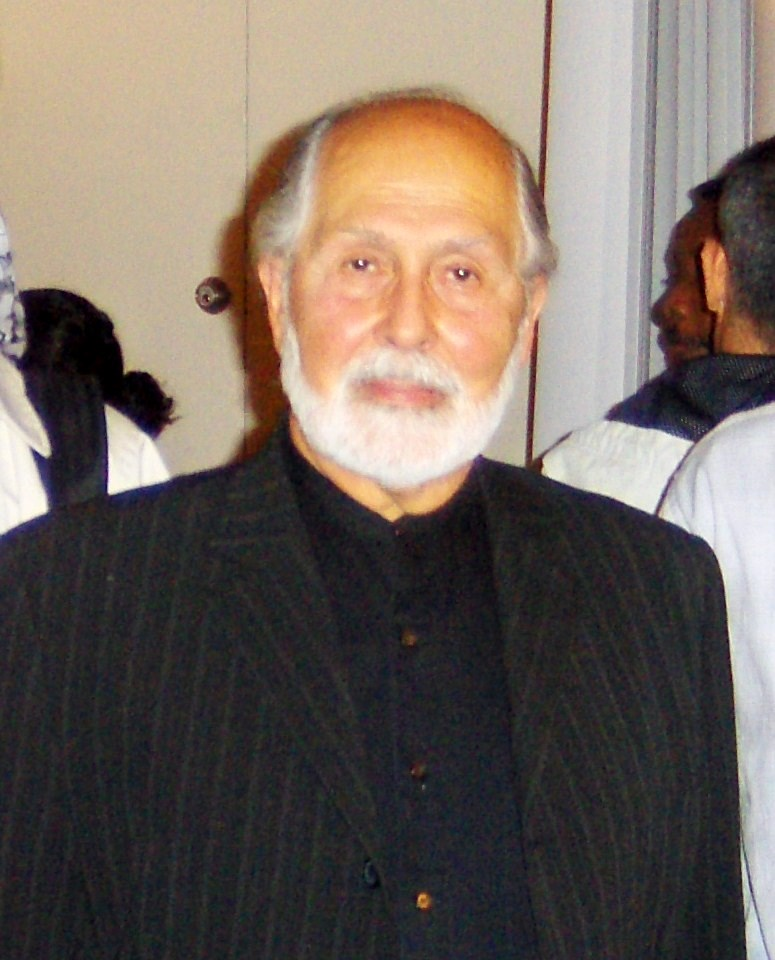
Seyyed Hossein Nasr

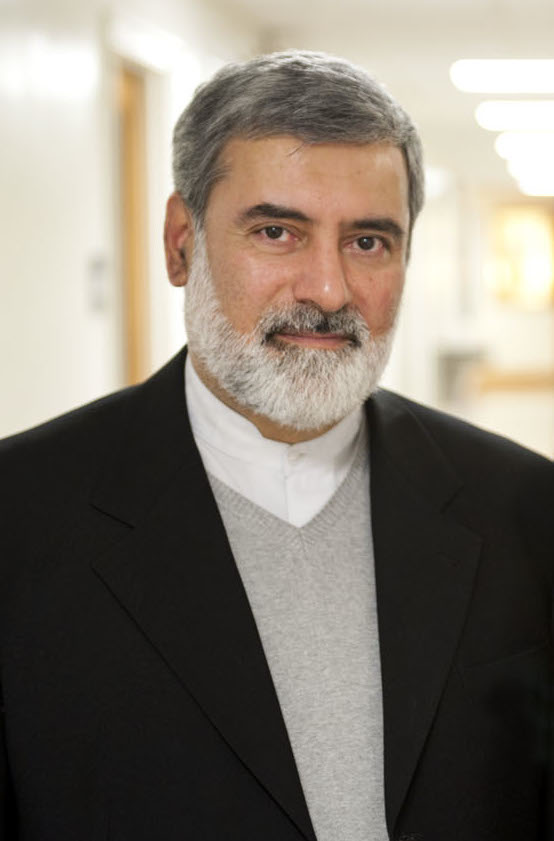
Mohsen Kadivar

- Usman dan Fodio (1754–1817)
- Ja'far Kashfi (1755–1851)
- Zayn al-Abidin Shirvani (1779–1837)
- Abbasgulu Bakikhanov (1794–1847)
- Mahmud Bayazidi (1797–1859)
- Hadi Sabzavari (1797–1873)
- Rifa'a at-Tahtawi (1801–1873)
- Mulla Hakim Muhammad Azim (1804–1853)
- Abd al-Qadir dan Tafa (1804–1864)
- Mulla Ali Kani (1805–1888)
- Syed Ahmad Khan (1817–1898)
- Mirza Hashem Eshkevari (1834–1876)
- Jamal al-Din al-Afghani (1838–1897)
- Muhammad Abduh (1849–1905)
- Syed Ameer Ali (1849–1928)
- Abd al-Rahman al-Kawakibi (1854–1902)
- Shibli Nomani (1857–1914)
- Ma Qixi (1857–1914)
- Qasim Amin (1863–1908)
- Shakib Arslan (1869–1946)
- Rıza Tevfik Bölükbaşı (1869–1949)
- Musa Bigiev (1873–1949)
- Muhammad Iqbal (1877–1938)
- Said Nursi (1877–1960)
- Sati' al-Husri (1880–1968)
- Mustafa 'Abd ar-Raziq (1885–1947)
- Syed Zafarul Hasan (1885–1949)
- René Guénon (1886–1951)
- Muhammad Taqi Amoli (1887–1971)
- Mirza Mahdi Ashtiani (1888–1952)
- Taha Hussein (1889–1973)
- Mirza Shari'at-Sanglaji (1891–1944)
- Nur Ali Elahi (1895–1974)
- Tan Malaka (1897–1949)
- Khalil Kamarah'i (1898–1984)
- Ruhollah Khomeini (1900–1989)
- Muhammad Asad (1900–1992)
- Mahdi Elahi Ghomshei (1901–1973)
- Mohamed Hamouda Bensai (1902–1998)
- Henry Corbin (1903–1978)
- Abul A'la Maududi (1903–1979)
- Muhammad Husayn Tabataba'i (1903–1981)
- Ghulam Ahmed Perwez (1903–1985)
- Muhammad Rida al-Muzaffar (1904–1964)
- Muhammad Rafiuddin (1904–1969)
- Malek Bennabi (1905–1973)
- Zaki Naguib Mahmoud (1905–1993)
- Sayyid Qutb (1906–1966)
- Jalaludin Abdur Rahim (1906–1977)
- Hamka (1908–1981)
- Ahmad Fardid (1910–1994)
- Abul Hasan Ali Hasani Nadwi (1913–1999)
- Roger Garaudy (1913–2012)
- Fazlur Rahman Ansari (1914–1974)
- Ali Shah Bukhari (1914–1979)
- Nuri Ja'far (1914–1991)
- Abdallah al-Alayli (1914–1996)
- Abdel Rahman Badawi (1917–2002)
- Morteza Motahhari (1919–1979)
- Fazlur Rahman Malik (1919–1988)
- Ismail al-Faruqi (1921–1986)
- Mustafa Mahmoud (1921–2009)
- Jalal Al-e-Ahmad (1923–1969)
- Mohammad-Taqi Ja'fari (1923–1998)
- Javid Iqbal (1924–2015)
- Alija Izetbegović (1925–2003)
- Syed Zahoor Shah Hashmi (1926–1978)
- Jamal Khwaja (1926–2020)
- Yusuf al-Qaradawi (1926–2022)
- Fouad Zakariyya (1927–2010)
- Razi Shirazi (1927–2021)
- Mohammad Mofatteh (1928–1979)
- Mohammed Arkoun (1928–2010)
- Musa al-Sadr (1928–dis.1978)
- Shihabuddin Nadvi (1931–2002)
- Jawdat Said (1931–2022)
- Mir Shamsuddin Adib-Soltani (1931–2023)
- Syed Muhammad Naquib al-Attas (1931–)
- Tahir Allauddin Al-Qadri Al-Gillani (1932–1991)
- Israr Ahmed (1932–2010)
- Ali Shariati (1933–1977)
- Ahmad Ahmadi (1933–2018)
- Abdollah Javadi Amoli (1933–)
- Seyyed Hossein Nasr (1933–)
- Reza Davari Ardakani (1933–)
- Waheed Akhtar (1934–1996)
- Sadiq Jalal al-Azm (1934–2016)
- Tayyeb Tizini (1934–2019)
- Gholamhossein Ebrahimi Dinani (1934–)
- Muhammad Baqir al-Sadr (1935–1980)
- Musa Bazi (1935–1998)
- Mohammed Abed al-Jabri (1935–2010)
- Dariush Shayegan (1935–2018)
- Taqi Yazdi (1935–2021)
- Hassan Hanafi (1935–2021)
- Mahdi Amel (1936–1987)
- Mohammad Mojtahed Shabestari (1936–)
- Roshdi Rashed (1936–)
- Muhammad Shahrur (1938–2019)
- Abu Abd al-Rahman Ibn Aqil al-Zahiri (1938–)
- Ali Harb (1941–)
- Imran N. Hosein (1942–)
- Azizah Y. al-Hibri (1943–)
- William Chittick (1943–)
- Youssef Seddik (1943–)
- Gholamreza Aavani (1943–)
- Nasrollah Pourjavady (1943–)
- Taha Abdurrahman (1944–)
- Javad Tabatabai (1945–2023)
- Abdolkarim Soroush (1945–)
- Qamaruzzaman Azmi (1946–)
- Osman Bakar (1946–)
- Mohamed Habib Marzouki (1947–)
- Modjtaba Sadria (1949–)
- Nagib El-Hassadi (1952–2025)
- Javed Ahmad Ghamidi (1952–)
- Hajj Muhammad Legenhausen (1953–)
- Malek Chebel (1953–2016)
- Ali Akbar Rashad (1955–)
- Muhammad Kamal (1955–)
- Souleymane Bachir Diagne (1955–)
- Mostafa Malekian (1956–)
- Éric Geoffroy (1956–)
- Mohsen Kadivar (1959–)
- Mezri Haddad (1961–)
- Ahmad Vaezi (1962–)
- Tariq Ramadan (1962–)
- Mahmoud Khatami (1962–)
- Shabbir Akhtar (1963–2023)
- A. Monem Mahjoub (1963–)
- Bijan Abdolkarimi (1963–)
- Insha-Allah Rahmati (1966–)

== See also ==
- Lists of philosophers
- Islamic philosophy
- Early Islamic philosophy
- Contemporary Islamic philosophy
- Islamic scholars
- List of Iranian philosophers
