= List of Iranian philosophers =

This is a non-comprehensive list of Iranian philosophers.

== Pre-modern ==
=== A ===
- Abū Rayḥān al-Bīrūnī
- Al Amiri
- Allameh Tabatabaei
- Avicenna

=== D ===
- Gholamhossein Ebrahimi Dinani

=== F ===
- Ahmad Fardid
- Farabi

=== G ===
- al-Ghazali

=== H ===
- Ayn-al-Qudat Hamadani
- Hossein Nasr

=== J ===
- Jamasp
- Jamasp

=== K ===
- Omar Khayyám

=== M ===
- Abu Tahir Marwazi
- Mir Damad
- Ibn Miskawayh
- Mir Fendereski
- Mir Damad
- Mulla Hadi Sabzevari
- Mazdak
- Mu'ayyad fi'l-Din al-Shirazi

=== N ===
- Nasir Khusraw

=== O ===
- Ostanes

=== Q ===
- Qutb al-Din al-Shirazi

=== R ===
- Fakhr al-Din al-Razi

=== S ===
- Mulla Sadra
- Mu'ayyad fi'l-Din al-Shirazi
- Abu Yaqub Sijistani
- Shahab al-Din Suhrawardi
- Shaykh Tusi

=== T ===
- Nasir al-Din Tusi
- Manouchehr Taslimi

=== Z ===
- al-Zamakhshari
- Zoroaster

== Contemporary ==
- Bijan Abdolkarimi
- Morehshin Allahyari
- Reza Davari Ardakani
- Ahmad Mahdavi Damghani
- Nur Ali Elahi
- Hossein Elahi Ghomshei
- Mirza Hashem Eshkevari
- Mohammad Ilkhani
- Gholamreza Aavani
- Ramin Jahanbegloo
- Manuchehr Jamali
- Mahmoud Khatami
- Ali Latifiyan
- Nadia Maftouni
- Brian Massumi
- Seyyed Hossein Nasr
- Jalal Jalalizadeh
- Insha-Allah Rahmati
- Reza Negarestani
- Abdolkarim Soroush
- Allameh Tabatabaei
- Hamid Vahid
