= School of Isfahan =

School of Islamic philosophy

The Isfahan School (Persian: مكتب اصفهان) is a school of Islamic philosophy. It was founded by Mir Damad and reached its fullest development in the work of Mulla Sadra. The name was coined by Seyyed Hossein Nasr and Henry Corbin.

During the Safavid era in Iran, Shah Abbas' attention to intellectual traditions in Islam made Isfahan into a famous academic city and Iran's intellectual center at the time, along with the cities of Ray and Shiraz.

== Historical context ==
This school of thought began to develop once Iran was economically and politically stable. The Safavid court also provided funding for the arts, which also contributed to the development. At the time, there were many disputes between Shiite scholars, such as Ahamad Alavi, and Christian and Jewish scholars. In this period the intellectual life of Suhrawardi was revived by Mir Damad and Mulla Sadra. According to Seyyed Hosein Nasr, this school of thought plays an important role both in terms of the relation between philosophy and prophecy, and in the training of Mulla Sadra. The school of Isfahan is a subsidiary of the Shiraz school of philosophy. Several philosophers that were not part of the Shiraz school of thought had very important roles in preparing the Isfahan school, such as Ibn Turkah, Qadi Maybudi and Ibn Abi Jomhour Ahsaei. The group of founders then announced Shia as formal religion in Persia, in an attempt to unify the entire country, with Isfahan as their capital.

=== Founder ===
Mir Damad founded the Isfahan philosophical school. He was the nephew of Muhaqiq Karaki, an important Shia scholar who had influence in the Shia jurisprudence. Some consider him familiar with philosophical prophecy as a result to the problem of Time. Corbin describes Mir Damad as having an analytic mind and aware of religious foundation of knowledge. Perhaps the most important characteristic of Mira Damad's philosophy is a synthesis between Avicennism and Averroism, or his synthesis is between the intellectual and the spiritual. Mir Damad's theory on Time is as popular as Huduth Dahri's, though Damad's philosophical opinion is criticized by Huduth's pupil, Mulla Sadra. Historically, there was great strife between Mulla Sadra and Mir Damad, as a result of the differences of their philosophical theories on subjects such as time.

=== Other teachers ===
==== Mir Fendereski ====
Mir Abul Qasim Fendereski was a peripatetic philosopher and follower of Farabi and Avicenna. He was a Peripatetic, as opposed to the illuminationists. As a scholar, he taught several scientific subjects in the Isfahan school, such as mathematics and medicine. it is debated whether or not Mulla Sadra studied under him, though the two worked together extensively. Mir Fendereski also studied other religions, such as Zoroastrianism and Hinduism. He also wrote several works on Indian philosophy, a series of treatises on the fine arts, and one on his mystical experiences. According to Nasr, he was well-versed in different philosophies, poetry, alchemy, and the philosophy of Yoga. Mir Fendereski collaborated with Mir Damad to write the Treatise of Sanaiyyah, attempting to link philosophy and prophecy. Mir Fendereski also attempted to translate several Indian philosophical works into Persian.

==== Shaykh-i Baha’i ====
Shaykh-i Baha’i was one of the three masters of Mulla Sadra, worked in the Isfahan school, and served as chief jurist on the Safavid Court. Like many Islamic scholars of the era, he was both a scientist and a man of wisdom; like Mir Damad and Mir Fendereski, he was skilled in several sciences. At the time, he attempted to harmonize the relationship between Shariah and Tariqah. He coined the term Hikmat-e Yamani (wisdom of believing.) He believed that humans were the only being capable of intelligence in a philosophy called "The Place of Illumination for Existence".

== Philosophers of Mir Damad's School ==
- Sayyed Ahmad Alavi
- Shams Addin Muhammad Gilani
- Abd al-Razzaq Lahiji
- Qutb Addin Muhammad Eshkevari

== Philosophers of Shaykh-i Baha’i's School ==
- Mulla Sadra
- Mohsen Fayz Kashani
- Mirza Rafiaa Naeini

== Philosophers of Mir Fendereski's School ==
- Agha Hosein Khansari
- Muhammad Baqir Sabzevari

== Philosophers of Rajab Ali Tabrizi's school ==
- Qazi Saeed Qomi
- Mir Qavam Addin Razi
- Muhammad Sadiq Ardestani

== Other philosophers of Isfahan School ==
- Mulla Muhammad Sadiq Ardestan
- Muhammad Ismaeil Khajouei
- Molla Naima Taleghani
- Abdu Al Rahim Damavandi
- Agha Muhammad Bid Abadi
- Mulla Mahdi Naraqi
- Mulla Ali Nuri
- Mulla Nazar Ali gilani
- Molla Esmaeel Isfahani
- Molla Abdollah Zonuzi
- Molla hadi Sabzevari
- Molla Muhammad Esmaeel Darb Koushki
- Molla Muhammad Kashani
- Jahangir khan Qashqaei

== Sources ==
- Newman, Andrew J. (2006). Safavid Iran: Rebirth of a Persian Empire. Library of Middle East History. Vol. 5. I.B.Tauris. ISBN 9781860646676.
- Rula Jurdi Abisaab (2004). Converting Persia: Religion and Power in the Safavid Empire. International Library of Iranian Studies. Vol. 1. I.B.Tauris. ISBN 9781860649707.
- Savory, Roger (2007). Iran Under the Safavids. Cambridge University Press. ISBN 9780521042512.
