= Nizam al-Din Ahmad al-Husayni =

Former prime minister of the Sultanate of Golconda

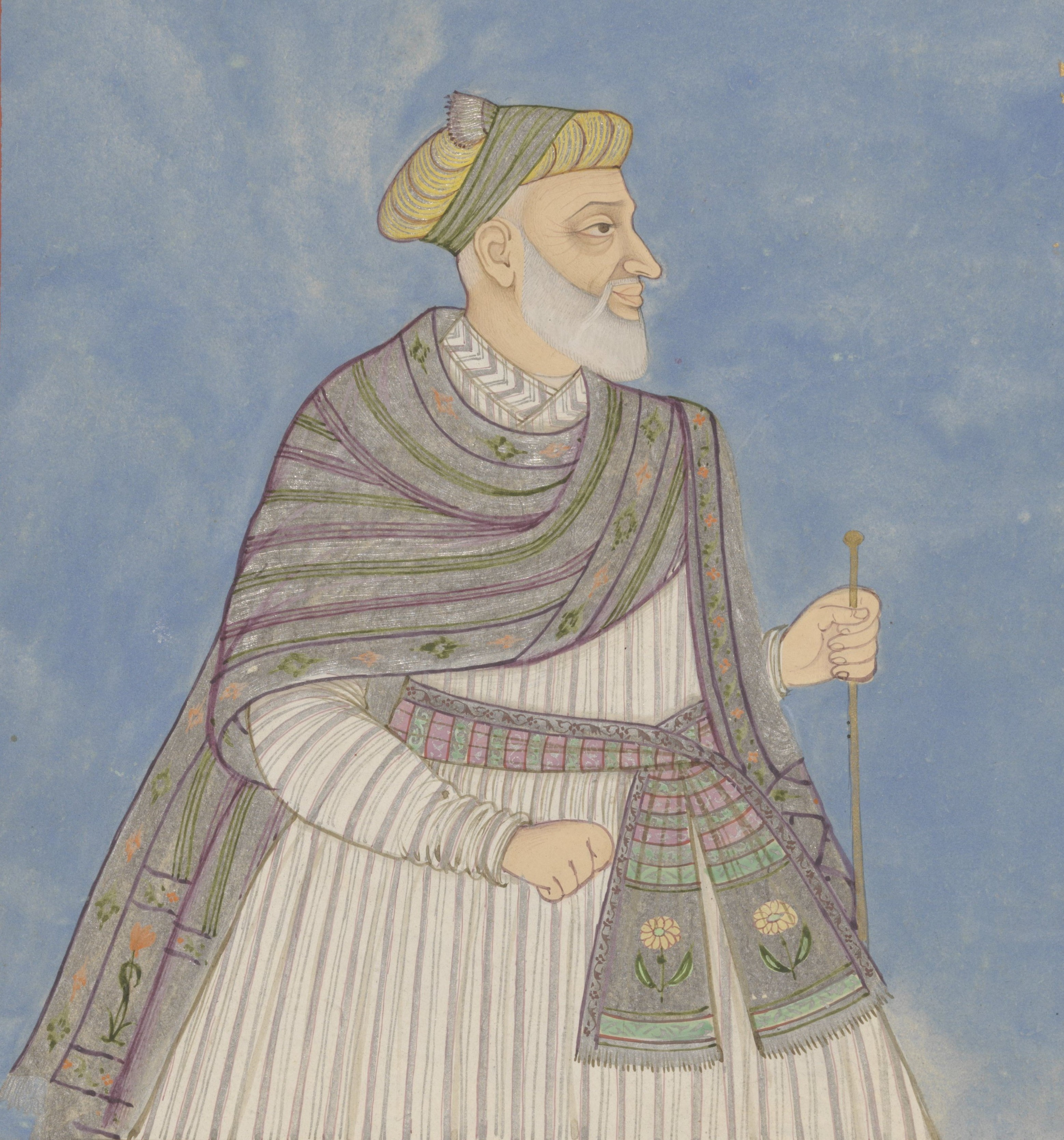
- Portrait of Nizam al-Din Ahmad al-Husayni, dated 1686. Stored in the Rijksmuseum, Netherlands
- Born: 7 July 1618; Taif, Ottoman Empire
- Died: May 1674 (aged 55); Sultanate of Golconda
- Relatives: Sadr ad-Din Dashtaki (ancestor); Ibrahim ibn Salam Allah (great-grandfather); Nasir al-Din (uncle); Muhammad Ma'sum (father); Ibn Ma'sum al-Madani (son)

Nizam al-Din Ahmad al-Husayni (Arabic: نظام الدين أحمد الحسيني: 7 July 1618 – May 1674) was the prime minister of the Sultanate of Golconda from 1656 to 1672.

Born to a sayyid family (descendants of the Islamic prophet Muhammad) in Taif in the Arabian Peninsula, his lineage traced back to prominent scholars and Safavid royalty in Iran. Educated in fiqh (Islamic jurisprudence), hadith, Arabic and logic, he married the daughter of a distinguished Meccan jurist and later a daughter of Abdullah Qutb Shah (r. 1626–1672), the ruler of the Golconda. This second marriage facilitated his rise to prominence, and in 1656 he was appointed prime minister of Golconda. Following Abdullah Qutb Shah's death in 1672, Nizam al-Din Ahmad's influence waned, leading to his imprisonment and eventual death, likely by poisoning.

== Background and early life ==
He belonged to a sayyid family (descendants of the Islamic prophet Muhammad) who had long settled in Iran. He was descended from the religious scholar and landowner Sadr ad-Din Dashtaki (died 1498), who financially supported the Islamic school Mansuriyya Madrasa in the Iranian city of Shiraz. Nizam al-Din Ahmad's great-grandfather Ibrahim ibn Salam Allah (died 1582/83) had married the Safavid princess Gawhar Shad Begum, the daughter of Ibrahim Mirza. A global network was established by the offspring of this union. Nizam al-Din Ahmad's father Muhammad Ma'sum (died 1622/23) and uncle Nasir al-Din (died 1614/15) left the country for Taif and Mecca in the Arabian Peninsula, while another branch of the family stayed in the Fars region in southern Iran. Surviving archival evidence, including letters and legal papers, demonstrate that Nizam al-Din Ahmad knew and used Persian, despite appearing to have written poetry only in Arabic.

Nizam al-Din Ahmad was born on 7 July 1618 in Taif. He was taught a variety of subjects, including fiqh (Islamic jurisprudence), hadith, Arabic and logic. He reportedly had a great memory that enhanced his capacity to convey knowledge. He married the daughter of the distinguished Meccan jurist and merchant Muhammad ibn Ahmad al-Manufi (died 1634/35), who had been supported by the Ottoman sultan Murad IV (r. 1623–1640).

== Career in the Sultanate of Golconda ==
In the 17th-century, an area of exchange emerged among the polities of the western Indian Ocean, where mass migration was fueled by the interaction of religion, trade, and state-building. Journeys between the Arabian Peninsula, Iran, and India became routine during this period. Since the start of the 17th-century, the Sultanate of Golconda was also home to immigrant Arabic scholars from Iran and the Arabian Peninsula. Upon reaching the Deccan Plateau in 1645/6, Nizam al-Din Ahmad married a second wife, a daughter of Abdullah Qutb Shah (r. 1626–1672), the sultan of the Sultanate of Golconda.

The marriage paved the way for Nizam al-Din Ahmad's ascent to prominence, which in turn led to his patronage of Arabic literary culture. When the prime minister Muhammad Sa'id Ardistani shifted allegiance to the Mughal Empire (India's leading power at the time) in 1656, Nizam al-Din Ahmad further solidified his authority, being appointed as the prime minister the same year. At the Golconda court, Nizam al-Din Ahmad became a leading figure, alongside Hayat Bakhshi Baygum (died 1667), the mother and regent of Abdullah Qutb Shah. Elevated to the role of ʿAyn al-Mulk ("Eye of the Kingdom"), his authority allegedly surpassed that of the other ministers.

According to reports from Golconda's capital Hyderabad, he also had the role of a gatekeeper, introducing foreign merchants to the sultan. The Golconda citadel, the seat of government and home of the ruling dynasty, served as the residence of Nizam al-Din Ahmad for a period. In 1658/59, he had a palace built for him in Hyderabad. Following Abdullah Qutb Shah's death in 1672 and the struggle for succession, Nizam al-Din Ahmad's authority diminished. He was subsequently imprisoned by Sayyid Muzaffar, a military commander who had immigrated from Iran. Nizam al-Din Ahmad was killed in May 1674, likely due to poisoning.

Nizam al-Din Ahmad made an effort to exploit his position of power in Golconda to increase his family's political and financial ties to the states bordering the Arabian Sea. During the zenith of his power, he was in contact with Khalifeh Soltan and Mirza Mohammad Karaki, two of the leading religious statesmen in Safavid Iran. Several petitions were submitted by him, claiming ownership of landed property in Iran.

== Sources ==
- White, James (2023). Persian and Arabic Literary Communities in the Seventeenth Century: Migrant Poets Between Arabia, Iran and India. I.B. Tauris. ISBN 978-0755644568.
