= Mirza Abdul Karim Roushan =

20th-century Iranian philosopher

Ayatollah Mirza Abdul Karim Roushan Tehrani

Personal life
- Born: Tehran; 1903 Tehran, Iran
- Died: 1992 (aged 88–89) Tehran
- Resting place: Tehran
- Main interest(s): Islamic philosophy, jurisprudence, Mystics

Religious life
- Religion: Islam

Muslim leader
- Disciple of: Sheykh Ali Lavasani, Sheykh Muhammad Lavasani, Aqa Zol MAjdayn, Mirza Mehdi Ashtiani, Mirza Taher Tonekaboni, Mirza Ebrahim Emam Zadeh Zeidi, Mirza Muhammad Ali Shah Abadi, Sheykh Muhammad Taqi Amoli.

Mirza Abdul Karim Roushan Tehrani was an Iranian philosopher on mysticism, law, and the Quran.

== Authority ==
When aged 28, he received permission of Ejtehad from Sayyid Mar'ashi Najafi.

== Character ==
As a philosopher, he stressed the relationship between wisdom, mysticism and the Quran. He often advised his pupils to practice self-reflection, contemplating divine love, and praying.

== Teachers ==
His teachers included Jalal Addin Ashtiani described Ayatollah Roushan Tehrani as the Only Factual Pupil of Mirza Mahdi Ashtiani. Other notable instructors of Mirza were Sheykh Ali Lavasani, Sheykh Muhammad Lavasani, Aqa Zol MAjdayn, Mirza Mehdi Ashtiani, Mirza Taher Tonekaboni, Mirza Ebrahim Emam Zadeh Zeidi, Mirza Muhammad Ali Shah Abadi, Muhammad Taqi Amoli.

== Sources ==
Interviews about Abdulkarim Roushan Tehrani, 2003, Keihan e Farhangi Magazine. number 203.

The history of Contemporary Men of Wisdom and Mistycs, Manouchehr Sadoughi Soha, Anjoman hekmat va Falsafeh publication.1979
