= Taleghani (surname) =

Taleghani (Persian: طالقانی) is a surname which is mostly used in Iran. People with the surname included:

- Abdol Majid Taleqani (1737/8–1771/2), Persian calligrapher
- Azam Taleghani (1943–2019), Iranian politician and journalist
- Iraj Kalantari Taleghani, Iranian architect
- Khalil Taleghani (1912–1992), Iranian engineer and politician
- Mahmoud Taleghani (1911–1979), Iranian theologian
- Molla Naima Taleghani (died 1738), Iranian Shia philosopher and theologian
- Vahideh Taleghani (born c. 1953), Iranian politician
