= Abdu Al Rahim Damavandi =

Iranian shia philosopher

Molla Abdul Rahim Damavandi (1737–1757) was an Iranian Shia philosopher and one of the leading of Zahabiyyah Tarighah.

== Life ==
He was the son of Muhammad Yunes Isfahani. He is believed to have come from the city of Damavand, and also resided in Karbala. His ancestors were from Damavand, Iran but his father went to Isfahan. Molla Abdul Al Rahim's education occurred in Isfahan, where he was a pupil of Muhammad Sadiq Ardestani. He mentioned the name of his teacher many times in the Hosseinian mysteries.

== Works ==
There is a little information about his works. There are some works which written by him. One of them is a commentary on Mir Fendereski' Ghasidah. The other one is Hosseinian mysteries or Asrare hoseini. Also a work by the name of explanation of tradition of Truth attributed to him which is in fact one part of Hosseinian mysteries. This book considers to explanation of the names of Allah.

== Hosseinian mysteries ==
The book of Asrar-e-hoseini or Hosseinian mysteries is a work on the names of Allah and description of them. This book is a mystical-philosophical work which shows the skillfully of Molla Abdul Al Rahim Damavandi. He knows the book from the emanations of Imam Hossein. This book was written in thirty seven chapters. The author called every chapter as Meftah or key. This book is in Persian and there are many Arabic and Persian prose in the book. He considered with the Shia's traditions and interested in them.

== See also ==
- Muhammad Sadiq Ardestani
- Islamic philosophy
