= Abu al-Abbas al-Lawkari =

Abu al-Abbas al-Lawkari (died early 12th century) was an Iranian philosopher, and one of the Avicenna's philosophical school who possessed a vital position in the chain of Islamic philosophy.

== Biography ==
Abu-al Abbas Fazl Ibn Muhammad al-Lawkari (Lugari) was a philosopher of 10th and 11th century CE.

Khayyam, Alkhazini, Sanai and Ghazali were his contemporaries. He had been Bahmanyar's disciple and therefore he became acquainted with wisdom of Avicenna by an intermediary. His date of birth is known, but in the table of contents compiled for the Al-Taliqat of Avicenna he has recorded its completion as 1109. al-Lawkari was literate as there are some Persian and Arabic poems composed by him.

== Works ==
- Asrar al-Hikmat
- Bayan al-Haq-Bidiman al-Sidq
- Diwan

== Death ==
He died in the early 12th century in Mary, Turkmenistan.
