= Saʽid Qomi =

Persian philosopher (1639–1691)

Saʽid Qomi (Persian: سعید قمی; 1639–1691) was an Iranian Shia philosopher closely associated with the Qom School. Born in 1639, Qazi completed his early education in Qom and later served as a judge in the region, earning the title Qazi Said. His father, a scholar, imparted knowledge in medicine and philosophy to him. Notably, Qazi criticized the theory of substantial motion, often attributed to Mulla Sadra.

Qazi furthered his education in Isfahan, studying under eminent scholars such as Rajab Ali Tabrizi, Muhsen Feyz, and Abd al-Razzaq Lahiji. Under the influence of his teacher Rajab Ali, he composed a Persian treatise, Kalid-i bihisht (The Key of Paradise), exploring the theory of the equivocalness of being. Subsequently, he embarked on a Commentary on Forty Hadith, reaching the twenty-eighth hadith before concluding. In the later stages of his academic journey, Qazi authored a commentary on al-Tawhid by al-Shaykh al-Saduq.

Qazi Saeed Qomi was a proponent of mystical monotheism, deeply influenced by the teachings of Mohiuddin Arabi. His works emphasized innate annihilation, a concept aligned with Sufi thought, and he integrated mysticism with philosophy and sharia. Qazi defended the mystical foundations of monotheism and criticized perceived deviations in the philosophy of Mulla Sadra. Notably, he accused Sadra of occasionally failing to express the truth of monotheism, a viewpoint aligned with the opinions of mystics.

Qazi spent his final years in Alamaut, holding a prominent position in Qom, and died on the 18th of Ramazan in 1691.

== Philosophical views ==
Qazi Saeed Qomi's philosophical perspective can be summarized as follows:

Influence of Mohiuddin Arabi: Qazi was deeply influenced by Mohiuddin Arabi, frequently quoting and adhering to Arabi's words in defense of his Shia beliefs. He considered Mohiuddin Arabi as "Sheikh Mohiuddin, may God be pleased with him" and vehemently defended his mystical monotheistic ideas.

Critique of Mulla Sadra: Qazi criticized the philosophy of Mulla Sadra, particularly Sadra's theory of substantial motion. He accused Sadra of occasional failure to express the truth of monotheism, aligning himself with the opinions of mystics.

Defense of Mystical Monotheism: Qazi defended the mystical foundations of monotheism and emphasized the concept of innate annihilation. His works were full of expressions of pure mystical monotheism, and he considered deviations from this path, as he perceived in some of Sadra's ideas, as entailing shirk (associating partners with God) and disbelief.

Integration of Mysticism with Philosophy and Sharia: Qazi seamlessly integrated mysticism with philosophy and sharia in his works. He believed in the existing verbal commonality and the notion of "essence precedes existence" upheld by Avicenna and Illuminationism but rejected loose and baseless interpretations, advocating for a true understanding of mystical concepts.
