= Syed Abdul Sayeed =

- Era: 20th century Philosophy
- Region: Western philosophy, Indian philosophy
- School: Continental
- Doctoral students: Bijan Abdolkarimi
- Main interests: existentialism, ontology
- Notable ideas: reconciling Eastern and Western thought

Syed Abdul Sayeed is an Indian philosopher and professor of philosophy at The English and Foreign Languages University. He previously taught in Aligarh Muslim University for eighteen years. Sayeed received his PhD in 1985 from IIT Kanpur.

== Books ==
- Knowledge and Reality, Syed Abdul Sayeed, Academic Foundation, 1990, ISBN 9788171880751
