= Sayyed Ahmad Alavi =

Sayyed Ahmad Alavi, also known as Ahmad b. Zayn al-'Abidin al-'Abidin al-'Alawi al-'Amili, or Mir Sayyid Ahmad 'Alavi 'Amili, (d. between 1644 - 1650; Persian: سید احمد علوی) was an Iranian philosopher and theologian of the philosophical School of Isfahan.

== Life and education ==
Little is known about his life. His ancestors were residents of Aleppo and his father also sojourned there for a long time. His father migrated to Safavid Iran as part of the large-scale immigration of the Shia Levantine Ulama to Iran that had been going on ever since the reign of king Ismail I (r. 1501—1524). His family sojourned in Isfahan. Sayyed Ahmad himself was born in Isfahan, and received education under the supervision of Mir Damad and Shaykh Bahai. He was counted as one of the eminent pupils of Mir Damad's school of thought. He also had a family relationship with Mir Damad as he was his son-in-law and cousin. He was familiar with Hebrew language in order to deal with the texts of the Old Testament and New Testament.

== Works ==
Nearly fifty works are attributed to him in which the commentary of Qabasat (amounting up to 700 pages) is one of them. He wrote the commentary by the direct order of Mir Damad. He also has written a book by the name of "Izha al-Haq" as the earliest essay against Abu Muslim. Although Sayyed Ahmad followed the ways of his teacher, he simultaneously tried to show his dominance on other predecessors such as al-Farabi and Fakhr al-Din Samaki. Some other books written by him are:

- Miftah al-Shefa (i.e. Miftāḥ al-Shifāʼ, The Keys of Healing) as a commentary on Avicenna's The Book of Healing
- Masqal al-Safa (i.e. Miṣqal-i Safāʼ) as a response to christian missionary
- Lataef al-Qeybah (i.e. Laṭāʼif-i Ghaybah)

== Death ==
He died between 1644 and 1650.

== See also ==
- Philosophical school of isfahan

== Sources ==
- Abisaab, Rula Jurdi (2004). Converting Persia: Religion and Power in the Safavid Empire. I.B.Tauris. ISBN 978-1860649707.
- Babayan, Kathryn (2002). Mystics, Monarchs, and Messiahs: Cultural Landscapes of Early Modern Iran. Harvard University Press. ISBN 9780932885289.
- Quinn, Sholeh (2015). Shah Abbas: The King Who Refashioned Iran. Oneworld. ISBN 9781780745688.
