= Mulla Hamzah Gilani =

Iranian philosopher

Mulla Hamzah Gilani (Persian: ملا حمزه گیلانی; d. 1721/22; 1134 AH) was an Iranian shia philosopher. He was a pupil of Muhammad Sadiq Ardestani.

== Early life ==
He was born from Gilan province passed his life in Isfahan. Because of this, he is called an Isfahani. It is not clear when he was born but according to Hazin lahiji, Molla Hamzeh died around 1134 lunar Hijrah. Little information about his life appears in the main sources.

He was a pupil of Ardestani. He became skilled in Islamic philosophy. He continued the philosophy of Molla Sadra and endeavored to defend it. He is an important philosopher of the Isfahan school.

== Works ==
He left works in Peripatetic philosophy and about the philosophy of Mulla Sadra. His works include:

- Hikamte Sadeqiyah
- A gloss on The Book of Healing
- A treatise on Tashkik
- A commentary on Tjrid al eteqad

Mulla Hamzeh wrote the book of Hikamte Sadeqiyah in which he reported the philosophical courses of Ardestani.

== See also ==
- Muslim philosophers
- molla Sadra

== Recourses ==
- Henry Corbin and Sayyed Jalāl-al-Din Āštiāni, eds., Anthologie des philosophes iraniens depuis le XVIIe siècle jusqu’à nos jours/Montaḵabāt-i az āṯār-e ḥokamāʾ-e elāhi-e Irān az ʿaṣr-e Mir Dāmād o Mir Fendereski tā zamān-e ḥāżer, 4 vols., Paris and Tehran, 1971–79.
