= Ghyath al-Din Mansur Dashtaki =

Iranian Islamic philosopher (1461–1542)

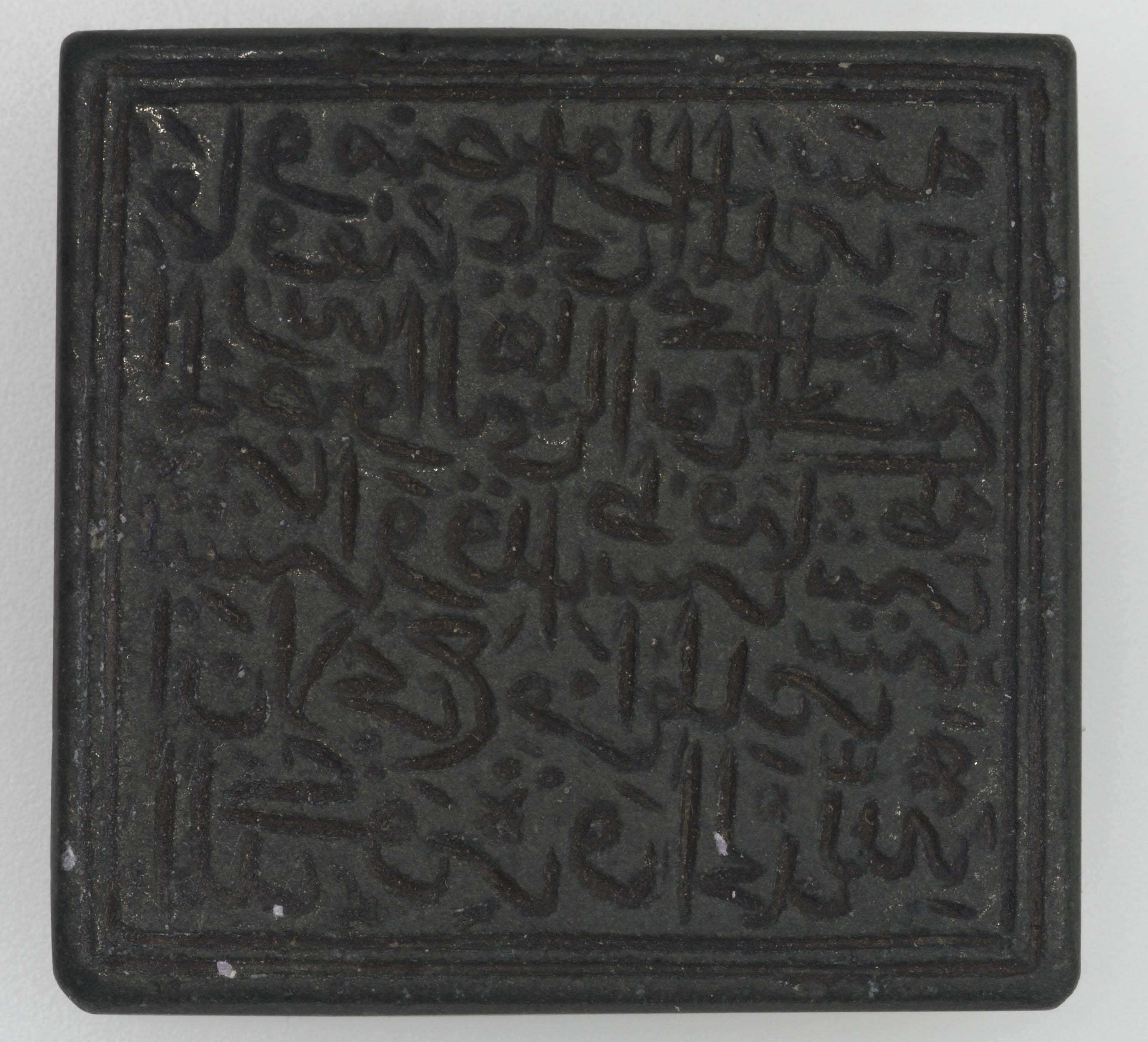
The waqf seal of Ghiyath al-Din Mansur. Created c. 1500 out of jade and inscribed in a casual thuluth script

Ghiyāth al-Din Mansur Dashtaki (Persian: غیاث‌الدین منصور دشتکی; 1461–1542) was an Iranian Safavid Islamic philosopher, the son of Sadr ad-Din Dashtaki. He has been called "the foremost philosopher of sixteenth-century Islam".

"His works spanned an impressive range, from theological, mystical, and Quranic studies to treatises on medicine, mathematics, astronomy, and astrology." He wrote Akhlaq-i Mansuri on ethics, a commentary on Suhrawardi's Hayākil al-nūr (Temples of Light), and glosses on Tusi's Sharh al-isharat. He also wrote a medical treatise, Ma’alem-o-Shafa.
