= Afdal al-Din Khunaji =

Persian scholar and judge

Afḍal al-Dīn Muḥammad ibn Nāmāwar ibn ʿAbd al-Malik al-Khūnajī, best known as Afḍal al-Dīn Khūnajī (May 1194 – December 1248), was a Persian scholar and a judge (qadi) in Ayyubid Egypt. He is an important figure in the history of logic in the Arabic language. He appears to have hailed from the locality of Khunaj (a small town to the north of Zanjan) which had been destroyed in the 13th century during the Mongol invasion of Iran.

== Extant works ==
- al-Jumal
- al-Mujaz
- Kashf al-asrār ʿan ghawāmiḍ al-afkār
- Kulliyyāt
- al-Mūjaz fī ʿilm al-amrāḍ or al-Asbāb wa-l-ʿalāmāt
- al-Maṭālib al-ʿāliya fī l-ʿilm al-ilāhī

== Sources ==
- Fawzi, Nahidah; Negahban, Farzin (2015). "Afḍal al-Dīn al-Khūnajī". In Madelung, Wilferd; Daftary, Farhad (eds.). Encyclopaedia Islamica Online. Brill Online. ISSN 1875-9831.
- El-Rouayheb, Khaled (2010). "al-Khūnajī, Afḍal al-Dīn". In Fleet, Kate; Krämer, Gudrun; Matringe, Denis; Nawas, John; Rowson, Everett (eds.). Encyclopaedia of Islam (3rd ed.). Brill Online. ISSN 1873-9830.
- Street, Tony (2014). "Afḍal al-Dīn al-Khūnajī (d. 1248) on the Conversion of Modal Propositions". Oriens. 42 (3–4): 454–513. doi:10.1163/18778372-04203006.
