= Nagib El-Hassadi =

Libyan philosopher (1952–2025)

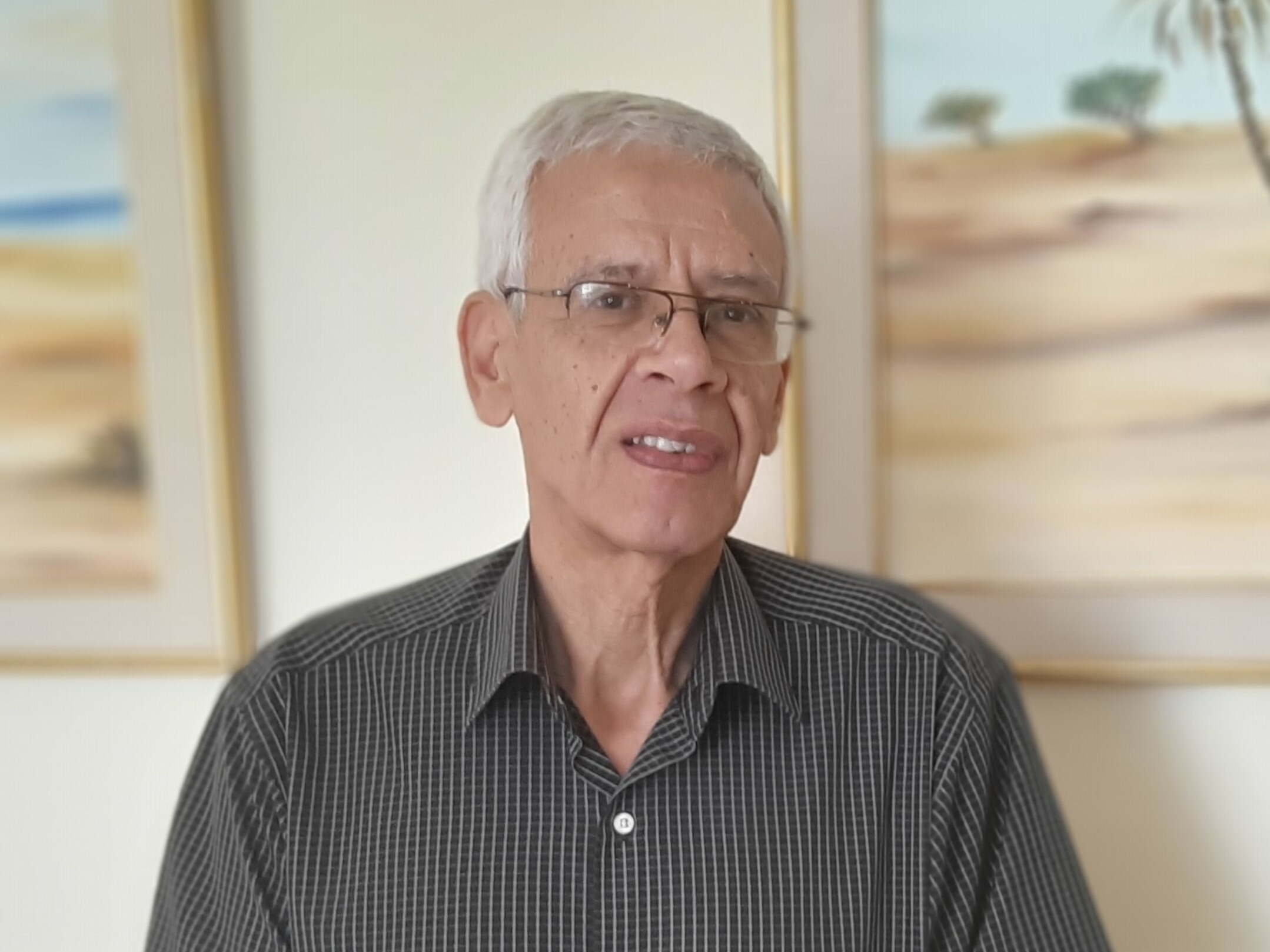
- Born: 25 August 1952; Derna
- Died: 3 July 2025 (aged 72); Amman
- Occupations: Philosopher, academic, writer, translator

Academic background
- Education: University of Libya Georgetown University University of Wisconsin–Madison

Nagib El-Hassadi (Arabic: نجيب الحصادي; 25 August 1952 – 3 July 2025) was a Libyan philosopher, academic, writer, and translator. He has authored numerous publications and served as a professor at the University of Benghazi.

== Early life and education ==
El-Hassadi was born in Derna, Libya. He completed his primary, preparatory, and secondary education in Libyan schools. He earned a bachelor's degree in philosophy from the University of Libya in 1973. He obtained a master's degree from Georgetown University in Washington, D.C., in 1977, followed by a second master's degree from the University of Wisconsin–Madison in 1979. He completed his PhD at the University of Wisconsin–Madison in 1983, with a dissertation titled Scientific Rationality: A Critique of Thomas Kuhn’s Conception of Scientific Rationality.

== Career ==
Upon returning to Libya, Al-Hassadi served as Chair of the Department of Philosophy at the Faculty of Arts, University of Benghazi in the mid-1990s. He later went on academic secondment to the United Arab Emirates University, where he was Chair of the Department of Philosophy at the College of Humanities and Social Sciences from 2001 to 2005. He also served as Associate Dean for Heritage and Cultural Affairs at the same college from 2003 to 2004, and as Chair of the Graduate Studies Committee from 2002 to 2004.

In addition, Al-Hassadi has led the National Center for Translation in Libya since 2013. He has been active in several national and regional organizations, including serving as President of the Libyan Philosophical Association and as a member of the Libyan Academy of Language and the Arab Thought Forum. He also contributed to drafting national strategic initiatives, including "Libya Vision 2025" and "Libya Vision 2040".

== Works ==
- The Illusions of Confusion (1989)
- Foundations of Contemporary Symbolic Logic (1993)
- Skepticism about the Sanctity of Science (1998)
- Critical Thinking Sensors (2020)
- He Walks Slowly and Outpaces Us
- Arsan al-Ruḥ (autobiography)

== Death ==
He died July 3, 2025, in a hospital in Amman, Jordan, after suffering from lung cancer.
