= Mulla Muzaffar Hussain Kashani =

Iranian philosopher and poet

Mulla Muzaffar Husayn Kashani was an Iranian philosopher and poet who lived around 1700 AD. His life and works were studied by Aqa Bozorg Tehrani.

== Life and works ==
Kashani wrote works on Plato, Aristotle, and Mulla Sadra.
