= Hasan Lahiji =

Islamic philosopher (1621-1709)

Hasan Lahiji (1621-1709), also known as Kashefi or Mirza Hasan, was a Shia theologian and philosopher in the Safavid period. His written works are primarily on the philosophy of the Shia imamate.

== Background ==
Hasan Lahiji was the son of Molla Abd al-Razzaq Lahiji and the grandson of Molla Sadra Shirazi. He studied in Qom until his death.

Mirza Hasan lived during the late Safavid dynasty and stood opposed to Hikmah and Irfan (against the Shia tradition of kalam al-hikmat al-ilåhiyyah). Shia Kalam replaced Kalam in this period, so Mirza Hasan learned Kalam and philosophy to defend the Shia theological teachings. He first wrote about Hikmah to explain the relationship between Hikmah and Sufism. Other esoteric religious authorities rejected him because he wrote about Hikmah. After his rejection he began to write about Ethics and Kalam.

== Works ==
Mirza Hasan wrote many works on Shia philosophy and Kalam. Both Ashtyani and Nasr referred to his works. According to Corbin, most of his works still exist as manuscripts. Some of his works include

- Zawahir al-hikam (written in Arabic) Zawahir [sg. Zahir, flower]; Hikam [sg. Hikmah]
- Ayineh-ye hikmah (Mirror of Philosophy)
- Rawai al hikmah.
- Ithbat al-Rajah.
- Sham Al-yaqin.
- Glosses upon Shawariq written by his father.

== Resources ==
- Anthology Des Philosophes Iraniens Depuis Le Xiiie Siécle Jusqú À Nos Jours, Tome Iii, Textes Choisis Et Présentés Par Sayyed Jalal Al Din Ashtiyani, Introduction Analytique Par Henry Corbin. 1976.
- Nasr, Islamic Philosophy from its Beginning to the Present, 2006.
