= Awḥad al-Dīn al-Rāzī =

Persian physician, philosopher-mystic and poet

Awḥad al-Dīn al-Rāzī was a 13th-century Persian physician, philosopher-mystic and poet. His dates are not known with certainty. A contemporary of the famous scholar Nasir al-Din al-Tusi, he was a protégé of the vizier Shams al-Din Juvayni. Al-Razi wrote Ḥakīm-nāma or Ijtimāʿ-i ʿallāma, a Persian philosophical-mystical treatise and dedicated it to Juvayni.
