= Muhammad Kamal (philosopher) =

Kurdish philosopher and academic

- محەممەد کەمال
- Born: 1955 (age 70–71); Kirkuk, Iraq
- Citizenship: Australian
- Occupations: Philosopher, academic, author, translator
- Years active: 1977–present
- Known for: Existential philosophy, Kurdish philosophical literature

Academic background
- Education: University of Karachi (PhD)
- Alma mater: University of Karachi
- Influences: Martin Heidegger, Mulla Sadra, Jean-Paul Sartre

Academic work
- School or tradition: Phenomenology, Existentialism
- Main interests: Ontology, Metaphysics, Islamic philosophy, Existential philosophy
- Notable works: From Essence to Being: The Philosophy of Mulla Sadra and Martin Heidegger

Muhammad Kamal (Kurdish: محەممەد کەمال; born 1955) is a Kurdish philosopher, academic, author, and translator. He is an Associate Professor of Islamic Studies at the University of Melbourne's Asia Institute in Australia, specializing in existential philosophy, particularly phenomenology.

== Early life and education ==
Muhammad Kamal was born in 1955 in Kirkuk, Iraq. He completed his primary and secondary education in Sulaymaniyah, and graduated from the Teachers' Institute in Erbil in 1977. From 1977 to 1979, he worked as a teacher in the village of Awakala.

In 1979 Kamal moved to Karachi, Pakistan, to pursue higher education. He completed his undergraduate, master's, and doctoral degrees at the University of Karachi, where he also served as a lecturer and assistant professor until 1994. In 1992, he conducted postdoctoral research on Martin Heidegger's philosophy in Germany with a DAAD fellowship.

== Academic career ==
In 1994 Kamal moved to Australia and began his academic career there. He started as a lecturer at Monash University in Melbourne in 1995, then moved to La Trobe University in 1997. Since 1997 he has been a professor of philosophy at the Asia Institute of the University of Melbourne.

Kamal's research focuses on existential philosophy, ontology, metaphysics, and Islamic philosophy. He has particular expertise in the philosophical works of Martin Heidegger and the 17th-century Persian philosopher Mulla Sadra.

== Publications ==
=== Books in English ===
- Interreligious Dialogue Models From the Life of the Prophet Muhammad (with Alwani Ghazali), Routledge, 2024
- A Universe in Constant Change: Mulla Sadra and Transubstantial Change, ICAS Press, 2022
- Mulla Sadra's Transcendent Philosophy, Taylor & Francis, 2016
- From Essence to Being: The Philosophy of Mulla Sadra and Martin Heidegger, ICAS Press, 2010

=== Book chapters ===
- "Islamic Modernism in India" in History of Indian Philosophy, Routledge, 2017
- "Mulla Sadra and Martin Heidegger: A Philosophical Turn" in The Misty Land of Ideas and the Light of Dialogue: An Anthology of Comparative Philosophy, ICAS Press, 2013

=== Selected journal articles ===
- "The Ezidi genocide and the need to challenge the Islamic State's ideology", Melbourne Asia Review, 2025
- "Parmenides and Mulla Sadra: The Mystical Journey to Being", 2019
- "Existence and Essence in Mulla Sadra's Ontology", Philosophy Study, 2019
- "Spinoza and the Relativity of Evil in the World", Open Journal of Philosophy, 2018
- "Ibn 'Arabi and Spinoza on God and the World", Open Journal of Philosophy, 2017

=== Books in Kurdish ===
Kamal has written extensively in Kurdish, contributing significantly to Kurdish philosophical literature:

- Descartes (دێکارت), Sardam, 2025
- Philosophy of Language (فەلسەفەی زمان), Sardam, 2024
- Marx as a Philosopher (مارکس وەکوو فەیلەسووف), Sardam, 2019
- Philosophy of Being (فەلسەفەی بوون), Andêsha, 2014
- Phenomenology (فینۆمینۆلۆجی), Binayî Publishing, 2013
- Plato's Philosophy (فەلسەفەی ئەفلاتون), Sardam, 2010
- Heidegger and a Philosophical Revolution (ھایدیگەر و شۆڕشێکی فەلسەفی), Sardam, 2007

Among his Kurdish works is Philosophy of Spinoza and Substance (فەلسەفەی سپینۆزا و جەوهەر), which examines the philosophy of Baruch Spinoza and presents his ideas in accessible Kurdish prose.

=== Translations into Kurdish ===
Kamal has translated major philosophical works into Kurdish, making Western philosophy accessible to Kurdish readers:

- Nietzsche by Martin Heidegger (four volumes), 2023
- Phenomenology of Spirit by Georg Wilhelm Friedrich Hegel, Sardam, 2016
- Being and Time by Martin Heidegger, Sardam, 2013
- Being and Nothingness by Jean-Paul Sartre, Sardam, 2011
- Poetics by Aristotle, Sardam, 2010
- Categories by Aristotle, Sardam, 2009
- The Republic by Plato, Sardam, 2009

== Research interests ==
Kamal's scholarly work focuses on:

- Ontology and metaphysics
- Existential philosophy and phenomenology
- Comparative philosophy between Islamic and Western traditions
- The philosophy of Mulla Sadra and Martin Heidegger
- Religious studies and interreligious dialogue

== Awards and recognition ==
- DAAD Postdoctoral Fellowship, 1994
- University of Melbourne Award, 2022

== Legacy and influence ==
Muhammad Kamal has made significant contributions to Kurdish intellectual life by translating major philosophical works into Kurdish and writing original philosophical texts in Kurdish. His work has helped make Western philosophical traditions accessible to Kurdish-speaking audiences while also contributing to Islamic philosophical scholarship in English.

In 2020, the University of Raparin organized a philosophy seminar featuring Kamal, where he addressed questions about "the meaning of human existence" and discussed various philosophers' perspectives on life and human purpose. The event highlighted his ongoing engagement with Kurdish academic institutions and his role in Kurdish intellectual discourse.

== See also ==
- Kurdish literature
- Islamic philosophy
- Phenomenology (philosophy)
- Existentialism
