= Mirza Hashem Eshkevari =

Mirza Hashem Eshkevari (Persian: میرزا هاشم اشکوری) was a Shi'a philosopher, jurist and mystic. He is one of the most important pupils of Agha Muhammad reza Qomshehi and his mystical school.

== Early life ==
He was born in Eshkevar at Gilan. Eshkevar had given rise to scientists such as Qutb Al Din Eshkevari and Sayyed Abul Qasem Eshkevari. He was born there in 1250 Hijra lunar. His family lineage goes back to the regress of Sadat.

== Education ==
He traveled for learning and education. He began in Eshkevar then went to Qazvin to participate in the class of eminent master of jurisprudence, Aqa Sayyed Ali who prepared a glossary on the book of Qavanin. He traveled to Tehran to take part in the class of eminent masters of mysticism Aqa Ali Modarres and Mirza Abul Hasan Jeleveh. He taught for many years in the seminary of Sepah salar in Tehran. He helped transform Islamic wisdom to other classes.

== Pupils ==
He educated many eminent pupils in different majors of Islamic sciences particularly mysticism and Islamic philosophy such as Mirza Ahmad, Ashtiyyani, Mirza Mehdi Ashtiyyani and Aqa Bozorg Hakim.

== Works ==
Most of his books are written in Arabic. These books are primarily concerned with mystical and philosophical contents. Some of them are:

- A Glossary of Meftah Al Qayb
- A Glossary on Mefath Al Ons
- A Treatise on the Necessary Existence
- A Treatise on Secret Points

== Death ==
He died of illness in 1293.

== See also ==
- Islamic philosophy
- Islamic scholars
- List of Iranian philosophers
- Mirza Mahdi Ashtiani
