= A. Monem Mahjoub =

Libyan linguist, philosopher, poet, historian, and political critic

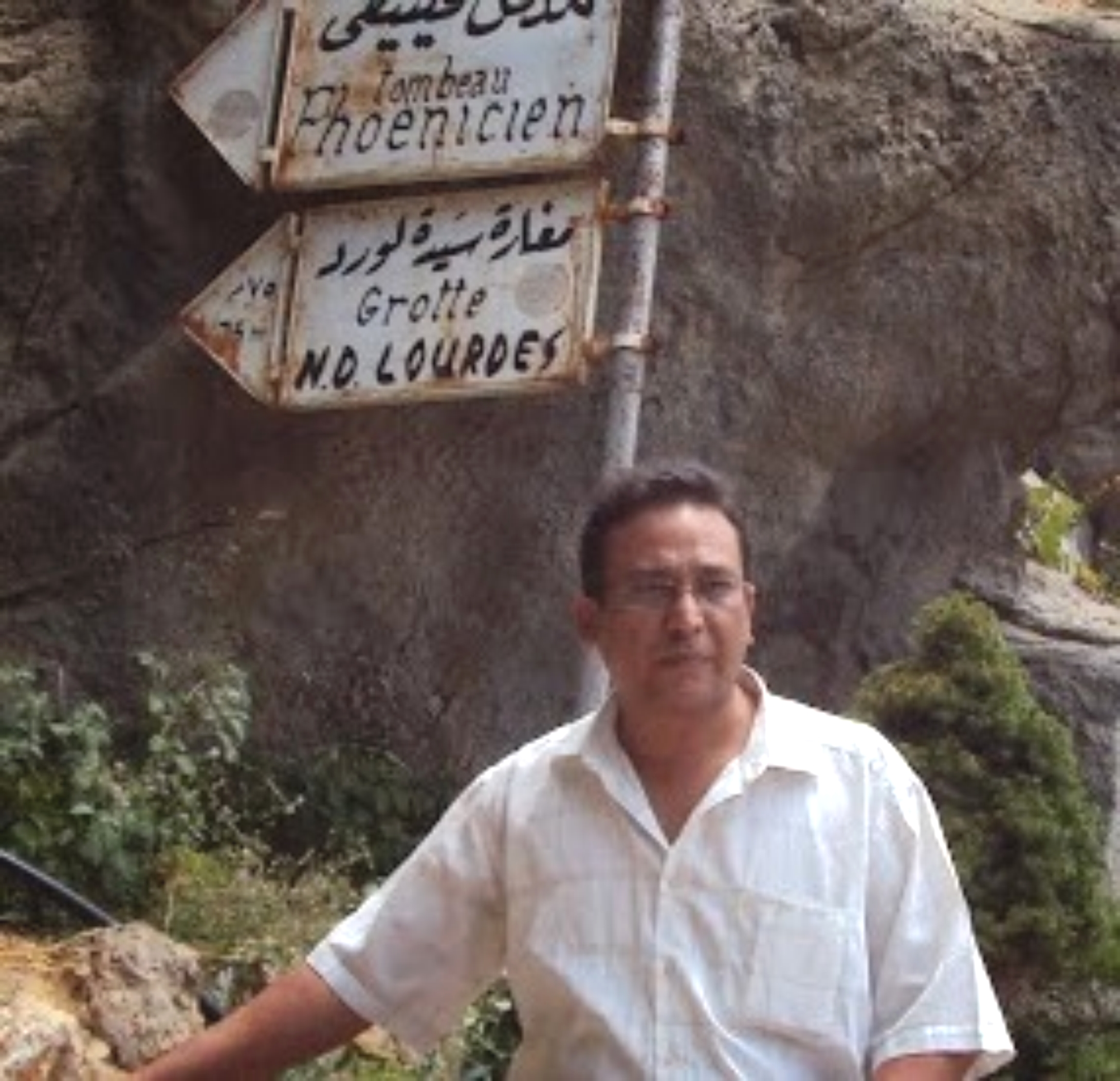
A. Monem Mahjoub

A. Monem Mahjoub (born May 4, 1963) is a Libyan linguist, philosopher, poet, historian, and political critic. Sometimes described as "the last Sumerian", his major works are in the fields of linguistics, philology, historiography, religion and humanistic thought, civilization development and politics. As a prolific author he has written more than twenty-five books.

Mahjoub was born in the Libyan town of Sorman, located east of the archaeological site of the city of Sabratha. As a youngster he was attracted by the residual remnants of the Roman and Phoenician civilizations. During this period he documented those monuments in a large photo collection. Having completed his primary education, he moved to study Industrial Management at George Brown College in Toronto, Canada where he studied for two years. He received a Master of Philosophy degree at Hassan University in Morocco. His Ph.D thesis, "Culture and Communication Arts Theory", was completed in 1999.

== Theory of Sumerian roots ==
Mahjoub argues that he continues to amend an academic perception in the fields of linguistics that has lasted since the late nineteenth-century, related to the Sumerian language, which originated on the shores of the Tigris and Euphrates rivers in southern Mesopotamia in the 4th millennium B.C. Mahjoub dismisses the idea that Sumerian was an isolated language and that its influence did not extend to the formulation of the world, especially Afroasiatic languages. He published his work Pre-language, Sumerian roots of Arabic and AfroAsiatic languages, presenting Afroasiology as a new coded term in historical linguistics, claiming that Sumerian is the embryonic stage of the Afroasiatic languages, including Arabic.

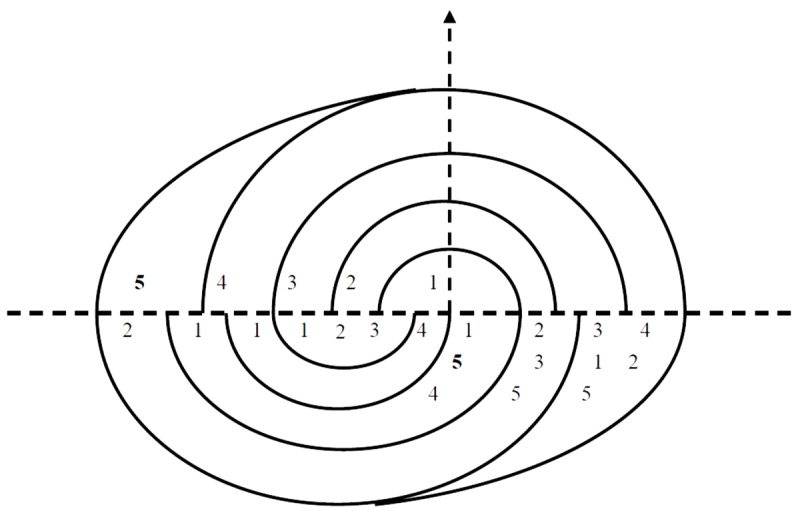
Afroasiatic progression

Mahjoub has endeavoured, through books published later, to support the theoretical hypothesis demonstrated in his Pre-language. He tracked and memorized phonetic changes that overlapped the Afroasiatic languages, by comparing Sumerian, Akkadian, Arabic and ancient Egyptian. He concluded that the Sumerian and Akkadian superposition is more than borrowed vocabulary, popularized as a result of the representation of the two languages in the same cuneiform writing, but that the Sumerian syllables are an embedded substratum in Akkadian and Arabic. He has also concluded that there are Afroasiatic arrays descended from the Sumerian, and that the Sumerian single and dual syllables are inherent in Akkadian, Arabic, Egyptian and other Afroasiatic languages and spoken dialects.

Related to this hypothesis, Mahjoub updated the primeval Arabic language's beginnings from the fourth millennium BC, i.e. since the cuneiform writing appeared to codify the Sumerian language. Further to that, the historical origins of the Arabs themselves must start from 12 thousand years, since the emergence of the vanguard of the Sumerians in Mesopotamia following the last ice age regression.

These results reflected his writings on philosophical propositions by stating that the Sumerian epics produced Chaldean wisdom that produced the concept of the logos. This would later be structurized in Greece and turned into an abstract mind out of history mobility with western philosophers.

== Mahjoub's position on Islam ==
Mahjoub believes that the current Islam is a new phase of a religion that has been changing since the third century AH (ninth century AD), and it has been remade in the twentieth century out of a confused mixture of clerical ideas by contemporary clergy, and that the multilayered understanding of Islam is reshaped to comply with ancient tribal traditions which are still powerful in the modern era, due to the control of the Muslim clerics who aspire to establish a theological authority in the Arab countries under the name of Islam. Thinking of faith as an individual matter, he considers freedom of belief to be the most necessary need in Islamic societies.

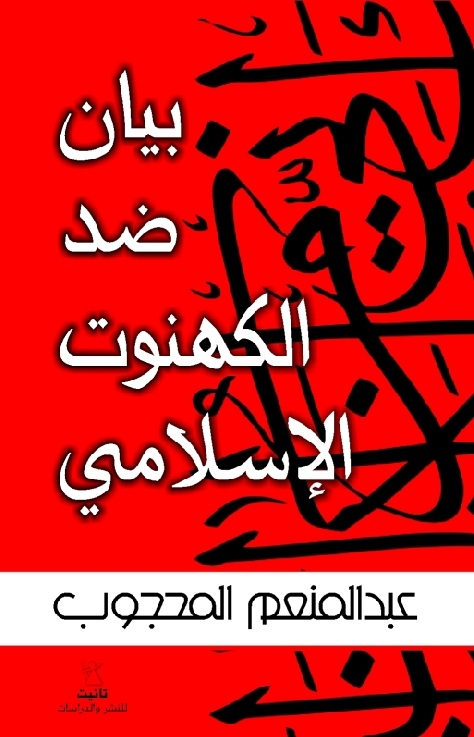
The cover of Mahjoub's manifesto against the Islamic priesthood

He published his Manifesto Against the Islamic Priesthood in Tunis, calling to liberate faith from the control of Islamic clergy and to rescue civil life from religious intervention. He wrote ironically to clerics, "Unchain faith, thus it can leave the muddy body and rise to sky", but in direct words, "Lock up Islam in mosques, Christianity in churches, and Judaism in Synagogues. Religion is an indoor activity. It's of temples not of streets."

== Activities ==
Mahjoub's career and cultural participation began in the 1980s, with intellectual and literary contributions to events held by Libyan and Arab world institutions and scientific centers, such as the Academy of Jamahiry Thought in Tripoli, Alfateh University, the Institute of Graduate Studies and the Union of Writers.

- Founder of Al-Jadeed (The new) newspaper, Tripoli, 1986/1988.
- Founder of the monthly Fadaat (spaces) for thought, culture and criticism, sponsored by the World Center for Studies and Researches. Tripoli, 2002/2010.
- Coordinator of the Afro-Asian Linguistics Forum. 2005/2010.
- Chairman of the PAM Publishing House, 2005/2010.
- Adviser to the Shura (Democracy) newspaper. Tripoli, 2011.
- Adviser to the Constitutional Thought Association, 2011/ongoing.
- Editor-in-chief of Lisan al-Arab (The Arabs Tongue) magazine, 2012/ongoing.
- Adviser to Sh'uun Dawliya (International Affairs) magazine, Tripoli, 2012.
- Editor-in-chief of Al-Mostaqil (The Independent) weekly magazine, Cairo, 2015 -2016.

== Awards and honors ==
- He received the State Prize (2010), nominated by the Libyan Arabic Language Compound for his work Pre-language, Sumerian roots of Arabic and Afroasiatic languages.
- He received the Accolade of the Country from the Constitutional Thought Association (2012) for "his activity to spread the culture of democracy, peaceful political action, renouncing violence, respecting the cultures of the Libyan social components and strong defence on the pan-Arab affiliation".

== Selected bibliography ==
- Manifesto Against Islamic Priesthood, Tanit Books, Tunisia, 2016.
- Actuality and Interpretation (2): The Question of Entity, Independent Books, Cairo, 2015.
- Readings in Peace and War, Independent Book, Cairo, Egypt, 2015.
- Uncharted Ethnicities, Tebu People: Their Identity, Language, and Lost History. Tebu Studies Centre, Tripoli, 2014.
- Voices of Babylon, Tanit Books, Tunisia, 2014.
- Warraq's Charm. Heritage Criticism of Religious Thought in The Third Century AH, Libya Home Center, Tripoli, Libya, 2013.
- Tanit Lexicon, Scientific Books, Beirut, 2013.
- Pre-Language, Sumerian Roots of Arabic and Afroasiatic Languages, Scientific Books, Beirut, 2008.
- Hannon Journey, Round the Parts of Libya beyond the Pillars of Hercules, Tanit Books, 2012.
- The Purple Book, Reflections on the Cultural History of Carthage, al-Farabi Books, Beirut, 2010.
- Democracy in the Light of Ethnic and Cultural Diversity in Africa, PAM, Tripoli, 2010.
- Kant..for Eternal Ppeace, Philosophical Draft, Translation Issued by PAM, Tripoli, 2010.
- Democratic Insufficiency, Fadaat Books, Tripoli, 2005.
- Actuality and Interpretation (1): The Heirs of Logos, World Center for Studies and Research, Tripoli, 2004.
- Recital (poetry), Tanit Books, 2003.
- Beyond the West, in the Process of Self and the Other, Fadaat Books, 2003.
- The Book of Illusion (poetry). Multaqa Books. Beirut, 1989.
- The Nil-state Society, General Establishment for Publishing and Distribution, Tripoli, 1987.

== Selected books about Mahjoub ==
- Back to Sumer. Discussions about the Sumerian roots theory of A. Monem Mahjoub. By: Walid Zribi (Editor). Arabesque Books, Tunisia, 2016.
- "A. Monem Mahjoub, The Last Sumerian, An Interview." By: Walid Zribi, Tunisian Company for Publishing, Tunisia, 2009.
- The Text of Contrast, Dialectics of Apparent and Implicit in The Book of Illusion. By: M. al-Zayat, General Council of Culture, Tripoli, 2008.
