= Rajab Ali Tabrizi =

Iranian philosopher and mystic (died 1670)

Rajab Ali Tabrizi (died in 1670) was an Iranian and Shiat philosopher and mystic of the 17th century. He was educated in the Sheikh Lotf Allah school.

== Books ==
- 1- Resaleh-ye
- 2- "Al Osul ol Asfiyeh" or "Asl ol Osul".
- 3- "A book in theology".
- 4- "The interpretation of Ayatolkorsi"
- 5- "The divine instructions"
- 6- His book of poetry

== Pupils ==
- Qazi Sa’id Qumi
