= Ali Harb =

Lebanese writer, intellectual, and philosopher

- Born: 1941 (age 84–85); El Babliye, Lebanon
- Occupations: Philosopher; writer; intellectual; researcher; professor

Ali Harb (Arabic: علي حرب) is a Lebanese writer, intellectual, and philosopher, he has many works and is known for his style of writings. He is influenced by Jacques Derrida, particularly with his theory of deconstruction. His book Critique of the Text is part of the curriculum in the University of Paris. He stands against elitism, intellectual fundamentalism, and formal logic which is based on holistic thinking not abstract intellectual tools and mechanisms for consideration and thought. Harb follows Kant’s approach of critiquing the mind and its mechanics and intellectual structure.

== Identity ==
Ali Harb was born in 1941 in El Babliye, South of Lebanon. He taught philosophy, which was part of the Lebanese curriculum, until he retired. Harb introduces himself in his book Identity Speech: An Intellectual Biography saying:

“I am a Bedouin, a heathen, a tribal, an Arab, a Muslim, a Lebanese Shia, a Greek, a Westerner, and a French in one meaning or another. A Christian, a Jew, a Buddhist…”

In an interview Harb says,

“I expressed my definition of identity as a person who is open to diversity and difference, when the Civil War, which is far from over, started because of how identities are treated. The horrible experiences, successive failures, and day-to-day life made me place my identity as a Muslim Arab Lebanese on the table of criticism and dissection to reveal what is behind it of illusions, stereotypes, or narcissistic reveries. The outcome was that I developed a new conviction about the identity being its statistics and relations with others, as much as it is a web of its own changing reciprocal effects and continuous transition process. As the case for strong identities. It is its ability to communicate and engage with the other, as much as it is its capacity for constant renewal considering the transitions and impact of crises. Let alone when we are in the age of communication and interdependence, where interests and fates are intertwined.”

=== Three stops ===
Harb specifies three fixed stops to his identity, he says,

“There are three pillars: first, my home country, Lebanon, where I live and work. Then, my career as a writer. And finally, my Arab identity as I speak and write using Arabic. Religious origins and narrow, sectarian ideologies do not concern me much. I do not acknowledge them and try to break out of their suffocating classifications, which put a person in specific categories to later refer to him or her by a number in a crowd to serve a holistic purpose, or to a person in a herd, driven by all kinds of blind instincts, as we suffer in Arab countries with a multi-ethnic structure.”

== Cultural and intellectual activity ==
Ali Harb holds an advanced cultural and intellectual position in the Arab world for his intellectual and philosophical works, which he started writing in 1985. His books are described as a new way of thinking, a new style of philosophical writing, or a different view of the world. Since philosophers– as Harb says– “are famous for their hunger for truth and love of knowledge, then comes one who writes about the critique of the truth, that opened up a new horizon of thought and enlightenment. Harb’s works opened up the doors for critics, writers, and scholars. They adopted them as references, utilized them in their philosophical writings, employed their methodological techniques to analyze and conduct studies, or used his ideas in their works, articles, and dissertations.”

== Works ==
Ali Harb has about 26 books on intellect, philosophy, and Arab heritage, some of which have been printed multiple times, as well as tens of articles and studies. Here are some of his works:

- Interventions, 1985
- Interpretation and Truth, 1985
- Love and Loss, 1990
- Critique of the Truth, 1993
- Critique of the Text, 1993
- Identity Speech: An Intellectual Biography, 1996
- Islam between Roger Garaudy and Nasr Hamid Abou Zayd, 1997.
- The World and its Dilemma, 2002
- The Man from Below: Religious Diseases and Obstacles of Modernity, 2005
- Times of Hypermodernity, 2005
- The Conspiracy of Adversaries, 2008
- This is How I Read: Post-Deconstruction, 2010
- Interests and Fates - The Manufacturing of a Common Life, 2010
- Soft Power Revolutions in the Arab world: Towards the Deconstruction of Dictatorships and Fundamentalisms, 2011
- The Game of Meaning, 2012
- Terrorism and its Creators, 2015
