= Bahmanyar =

Iranian scholar (died 1066)

Abu al-Hasan (or Abu al-Husayn) Bahmanyar ibn al-Marzban, better simply known as Bahmanyar (Persian: بهمنیار; died 1066) was an Iranian scholar and a pupil of Avicenna (d. 1037).

== Background ==
Bahmanyar was from a Zoroastrian family, reportedly from Azerbaijan in northern Iran. His father may have been the Bavandid prince al-Marzuban, who ruled in Mazandaran in the late 10th-century, and was the author of the Marzban-nama. Bahmanyar's knowledge of Arabic was not perfect.

== Life ==
Little is known of Bahmanyar's life. He most likely started his studies in philosophy along with Abu al-Qasim al-Kirmani in the Buyid city of Ray in northern Iran. There they both became involved in the administration, while they read Avicenna works. Bahmanyar was possibly part of the Buyid court in Ray through family ties with the Bavandid princess Sayyida Shirin, her husband Fakhr al-Dawla (r. 984–997) and son Majd al-Dawla (r. 997–1029), both Buyid rulers of Ray.

Bahmanyar eventually started to interact with Avicenna, which would later result in the latter's creation of the al-Mubāḥathāt ("The Discussions"), which were mainly answers to questions made by Bahmanyar. The work was compiled sometime between 1024 and 1037, during Avicenna's stay in Isfahan, the capital of the Kakuyid ruler Muhammad ibn Rustam Dushmanziyar (r. 1008–1041). In the work, Bahmanyar is referred to as al-Shaykh al-fāḍil ("the aristocratic gentleman"). Bahmanyar and Avicenna possibly encountered each other in 1014/5 at Ray, when the latter worked for Sayyida Shirin and Majd al-Dawla.

Bahmanyar's main work, the Kitāb al-taḥṣīl ("The Summation"), which summarises Avicenna's logic, physics and metaphysics was written between 1024 and 1037 and dedicated to his Zoroastrian uncle, Abu Mansur Bahram ibn Khurshid ibn Yazdyar, who was possibly the son of the treasurer of the Buyid emperor Adud al-Dawla (r. 949–983). Abu'l-Hasan Bayhaqi (d. 1169) writes that Bahmanyar also wrote a book on logic and one on music and other works are attributed to him.

== Beliefs ==
Bahmanyar reportedly converted to Islam. While his main work Kitāb al-taḥṣīl is ambiguous about his beliefs, the introduction and conclusion of the book are made in a Muslim manner and character, though it is unknown if these were part of the original version of the book or later added by secretaries. However, his conversion is considered plausible due to his way of thinking on questions regarding divine unity and the struggle between good and evil, which Bahmanyar places inside the created order, contrary to the Zoroastrian belief that associates it with the divine essence. Furthermore, his kunya Abu al-Husayn may be a possible sign of a conversion to Shia Islam.

== Sources ==
- Daiber, H. (1988). "Bahmanyār, Kīā". In Yarshater, Ehsan (ed.). Encyclopædia Iranica. Vol. III/5: Bahai Faith III–Baḵtīārī tribe II. London and New York: Routledge & Kegan Paul. pp. 501–503. ISBN 978-0-71009-117-8.
- Garakani, Gharaee; Brown, Keven (2013). "Bahmanyār b. al-Marzubān". In Madelung, Wilferd; Daftary, Farhad (eds.). Encyclopaedia Islamica Online. Brill Online. ISSN 1875-9831.
- Gutas, D. (1987). "Avicenna". In Yarshater, Ehsan (ed.). Encyclopædia Iranica. Vol. III/1: Ātaš–Awāʾel al-Maqālāt. London and New York: Routledge & Kegan Paul. pp. 67–70. ISBN 978-0-71009-113-0.
- Reisman, David C. (2009). "Bahmanyār b. al-Marzubān". In Fleet, Kate; Krämer, Gudrun; Matringe, Denis; Nawas, John; Rowson, Everett (eds.). Encyclopaedia of Islam (3rd ed.). Brill Online. ISSN 1873-9830.
- Rescher, Nicholas (1964). The Development of Arabic Logic. University of Pittsburgh Press. pp. 1–262. ISBN 9780822983873.
