= Mir Fendereski =

Persian philosopher, poet and mystic

- میرفِنْدِرِسْکی
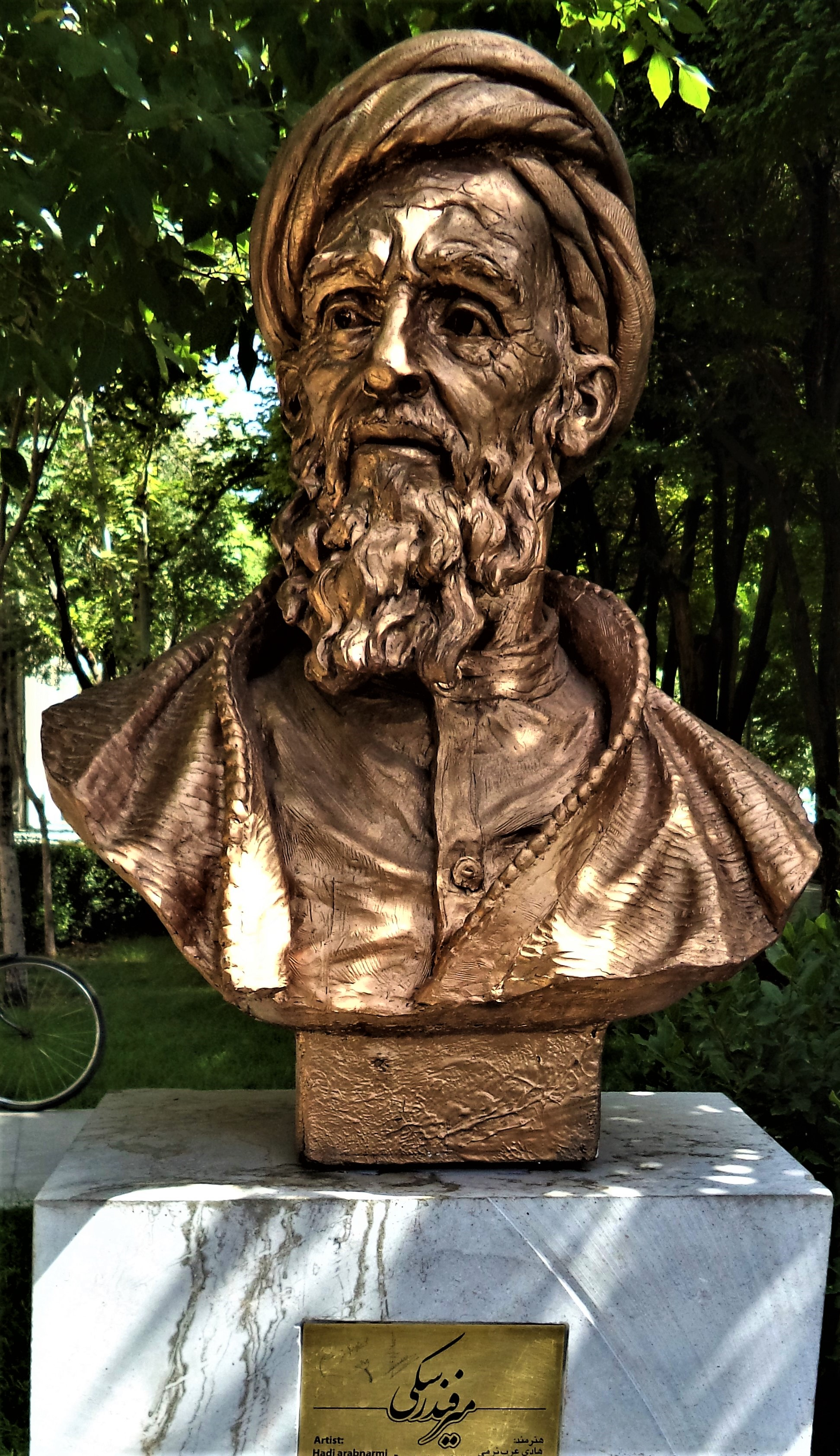
- Bust of Mir Fendereski in Isfahan province
- Born: 1562
- Died: 1640 (aged 77–78)
- Occupations: Philosopher & Poet
- Known for: Writing various works such as: Resâle Sanaie Resâleh dar kimiyâ Šahre ketabe mahârat Resāla al-ṣenāʿiya

Mir Fendereski (Persian: میرفِنْدِرِسْکی; 1562–1640) was a Persian philosopher, poet, and mystic of the Safavid era. His full name is given as Mir Abulqasim Mirfendereski (میرابوالقاسم میرفندرسکی). He lived for a while in Isfahan at the same time as Mir Damad, spent a great part of his life in India among yogis and Zoroastrians, and learnt from them. He was patronized by both the Safavid and Mughal courts. The famous Persian philosopher Mulla Sadra also studied under him.

== Life ==
Mir Fendereski remains a mysterious and enigmatic figure whom we know very little about. He was probably born around 1562/63 and died at the age of eighty. He gained a reputation of an ascetic at the court of Shah Abbas in Isfahan. He is said to have journeyed through India, where he became a vegetarian and refused to go on pilgrimage to Mecca, so he would not be forced to sacrifice sheep.

Mir Fendereski was trained in the works of Avicenna as he taught the Avicennian medical and philosophical compendiums of al-Qanun (the Canon) and Al-Shifa (the Cure) in Isfahan.

== Works ==
A number of works are attributed to him, although these have not been studied in detail. In his extensive commentary on the Persian translation of the Mahabharata (Razm-Nama in Persian) and Nizam al-Din Panipati's rendition of the Yoga Vasistha, he complains about the quality of the translation, which implies that he was familiar with Sanskrit. He was among a group of Persians at the Mughal court to engage with Indian thought.

Some of his most famous works are "Resâle Sanaie", "Resâleh dar kimiyâ" and "Šahre ketabe mahârat", in Persian language. He was also a poet and composed a long philosophical ode (qaṣida ḥekmiya) in imitation of and response to the Persian Ismaʿili thinker Nasir Khusraw. His best-known work is titled al-Resāla al-ṣenāʿiya, an examination of the arts and professions within an ideal society. The importance of this treatise is that it combines a number of genres and subject areas: political and ethical thought, mirrors for princes, metaphysics, and the critical subject of the classifications of the sciences.

== See also ==
- List of pre-modern Iranian scientists and scholars
- Iranian philosophy
- Philosophers
- Fenderesk District
