= Mirza Mahdi Ashtiani =

Iranian philosopher (1888–1952)

Ayatollah Mirza Mahdi Ashtiani
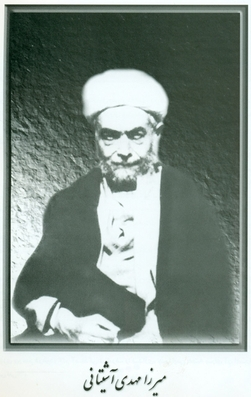
- Mirza Mahdi Ashtiani

Personal life
- Born: Tehran; 1888 Tehran, Sublime State of Iran
- Died: 1952 (aged 63–64) Qom, Imperial State of Iran
- Resting place: Fatima Masumeh Shrine
- Main interest(s): Islamic philosophy, jurisprudence

Religious life
- Religion: Islam

Muslim leader
- Disciple of: Mirza Abul hasan Jelveh, Mirza hasan Kermanshahi, Mir Shahab Neirizi, Aqa Mir Shirazi, Mirza Hashem Eshkavari, Ayatollah Akhoond Khorasani, Ayatollah Muhammad Kazem yazdi, Ayatollah Sayyed Muhammad Firouz Abadi, Aqa Zia Irqi, Ayatollah Aqa Sayyed Abul Hasan Esfahani, Mirza Hesein Naeini

Mirza Mahdi Ashtiani (Persian: میرزا مهدی آشتیانی; 1888 – 1952) was a man of wisdom, mysticism, and literature as well as a Great Master in the philosophical School of Tehran.

== Birth and family ==
Mirza Mahdi was born in 1889 in Tehran. His father, Mirza Jafar was a relative of Hajj Mirza Muhammad Hasan Ashtiani, famous as the Little Mirza, one of the greatest men of knowledge in Tehran.

== Education ==
Mirza Mahdi Ashtiani passed his childhood and adolescence in Tehran. After he passed the preliminary courses, he participated in the sessions of great teachers. He could read the Quran completely when he was 5 years old.

He learned mathematics from scholars such as al-Shaykh 'Abd al-Husayn Siybiwayh, Mirza Ghaffariyan Najm al-Dula, Mirza Jahanbakhsh Munajjim Burujirdi and Aqa Shaykh Muhammad Husayn Riyadi.

== Teachers ==
Mirza Mahdi had many great teachers, some of which are as follows:

- Mirza Abu l-hasan Jelveh
- Mirza hasan Kermanshahi
- Mir Shahab Neirizi
- Aqa Mir Shirazi
- Mirza Hashem Eshkevari
- Ayatollah Mohammad Kazem Khorasani
- Ayatollah Mohammed Kazem Yazdi
- Ayatollah Sayyed Muhammad Firouz Abadi
- Aqa Zia Iraqi
- Ayatollah Sayyid Abu al-Hasan Isfahani
- Muhammad Hussain Naini

== Career ==
He taught in different places such as Marvi School, Sepahsalar School, and the school of Mirza Muhammad Khan Qazvini. Sayyed Jalal Addin Ashtiani says that:" He taught twelve times the book of Healing of Avicenna, two times the book of Tamhid Al Qavaed and many times the book of Asfar of Mulla Sadra.

== Works ==
Aqa Mirza Mahdi Ashtiani has many books in different subjects mainly in the sphere of Wisdom and mysticism. Some of them are:

- Asas At Tawhid (the foundation of unity)
- Notes on the book of Poems of Wisdom
- Notes on Asfar in Arabic
- notes on Shefa (the book of Healing)
- notes on Fosus Al Hikam of Ibn Arabi
- Notes On the Book of Kefayeh (the knowledge of principles)
- notes on Makaseb

== Death ==
Mirza Mahdi Ashtiyani died on 23 April 1953, and his body was buried in the Fatima Masumeh Shrine in Qom, Iran.
