= Mohammad Sadeq Ardestani =

Muhammad Sadiq Ardestani (died 1721) was an Iranian Shia philosopher during the Safavid era.

== Life ==
Molla Muhammad Sadiq Ardestani, according to Henry Corbin, lived in the catastrophic period when Shah Sultan Hossein ruled out. His time coincided with siege of Isfahan by Afghans.

== Works ==
Ardestani has two primarily works in Islamic philosophy. His main work is Hikmah sadiqiya (the author's personal philosophy). This book has written by a pupil of Ardestani named Mulla Hamzah Gilani. He had also glossary on The Book of Healing and some commentaries on Quran surahs.

== Philosophical views ==
Aredestani, like Mullā Ṣadrā, criticized Avicenna and Avicennan's views. He, following Mullā Ṣadrā, believed that the faculty of imagination is immaterial. According to Henry Corbin, Ardestani had difficulties explaining the interconnection the universal soul with the body. Ardestani tried to solve the problem with the concept of epiphany or tajalli.

== See also ==
- Muslim philosophers

== Bibliography ==
- Corbin, Henry (1993). History Of Islamic Philosophy. Routledge. ISBN 978-1135198893.
- Seyyed Jalal al-Din Ashtiani (1978). "Introduction". منتخباتی از آثار حکمای الهی ایران [Selected Works of the Divine Sages of Iran] (in Arabic). Vol. 4.
