= Molla Naima Taleghani =

Iranian Shia philosopher and theologian

Molla Naima Taleghani (d. 1738; Persian: ملا نعیمای طالقانی), also known as Orfi (Persian: عرفی), was an Iranian Shia philosopher and theologian of the late Safavid era.

== Life ==
His full name was Mohammad Naim ibn Muhammad Taleghani, and he was from Taleqan, about 50 km west of Tehran. Known as Molla Naima, he was prominent in the late Safavid era. He lived during the reign of king Sultan Husayn (1694–1722), and saw the attack and subsequent ruining of the Safavid capital of Isfahan by the Afghans, a catastrophic incident in Iranian history. Molla Naima had to take refuge in Qom. Little more is known on the life of Molla Naima.

== Education ==
He was educated under the supervision of notable philosopher Muhammad Sadiq Ardestani, on whom there is also little information.

== Works ==
- New gloss on Tajrid al-'Iteqad (a new commentary)
- Commentary on Usul-Kafi
- A gloss on Al-isharat wa al-tanbihat by Avicenna
- Jabr va Tafviz (Predestination and Delegation)
- Qaedeh al-Vahed (The principle of unity)
- A treatise on modulation of being
- Minhaj Al-Roshd
