= Bijan Abdolkarimi =

Iranian philosopher (born 1963)

- بیژن عبدالکریمی
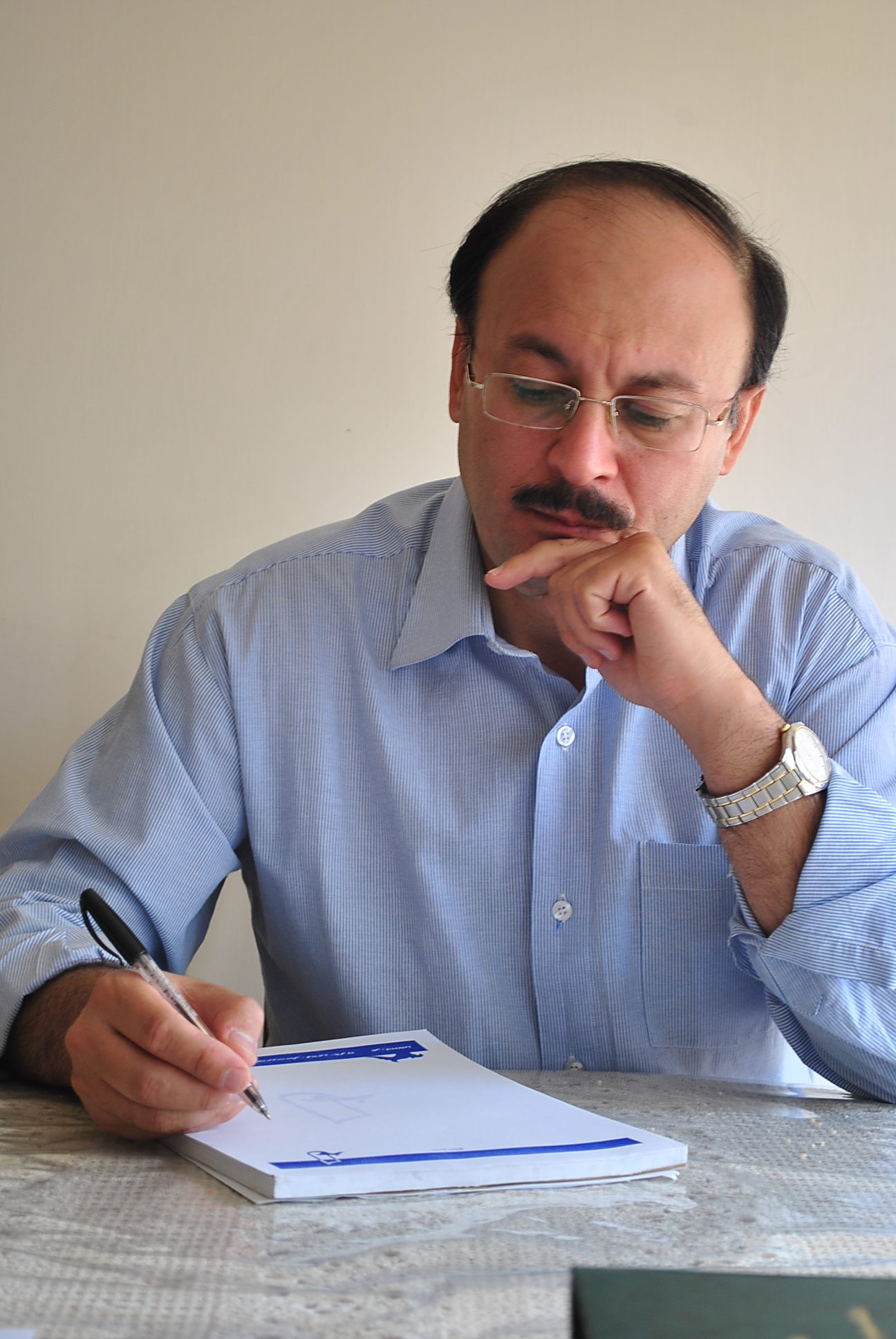
- Born: 1963 (age 62–63); Tehran, Iran
- Occupations: Philosopher, Writer, Poet, Translator

Education
- Education: Aligarh Muslim University (Ph.D.), University of Tehran (B.A. and M.A.)
- Thesis: The Critique of Kantian Subjectivism (A Heideggerian Perspective) (2001)
- Doctoral advisor: Syed Abdul Sayeed

Philosophical work
- Era: 21st century Philosophy
- Region: Western Philosophy
- School: Continental
- Main interests: Critique of the Western Culture and Thought; Existential phenomenology
- Notable ideas: Nietzscheian World, End of Theology

Bijan Abdolkarimi (Persian: بیژن عبدالکریمی; born 1963) is an Iranian philosopher, thinker, translator, and editor. His main interests are ontology, political philosophy and the critique of religious and intellectual traditions. He claims to challenge the dominant ideological discourse in Iran. He has participated in debates at Iranian universities and also in IRIB TV4 in which he has opposed the notion of Islamic humanities. He is also a scholar of Heidegger's thought and philosophy.

== Career ==
Abdolkarimi is associate professor of philosophy at Islamic Azad University North Tehran Branch since 2001. On 4 September 2021, he was fired from Islamic Azad University for alleged “defending the Pahlavi monarchy”. However, the expulsion was suspended on the basis of an interim measure granted by the President of the university.

== Views ==
The main characteristics of Abdolkarimi's thought may be summarized as follows:

- Abdolkarimi seeks to present a spiritual, meditative interpretation of Heidegger's thought.
- The relation between the West and East is his main issue in his philosophical thinking. He strongly criticizes any ideological, theological understanding of the West and East. He emphasizes a historical, phenomenological understanding of these two traditions.
- He has worked on the theory of the end of theology and its critical connotations. Following Gianni Vattimo, he believes that the main philosophical characteristic of our time is the destroyed ontology. Abdolkarimi interprets Vattimo's idea as the "metaphysicslessness of our time". But in the context of Abdolkarimi's thought, the term metaphysics is not merely in the Greek sense and refers to any historical theoretical tradition.
- Abdolkarimi believes that the human being's future thought is a kind of nonsecular-nontheological thinking, namely a way of thinking that is in disagreement to the secular, materialistic interpretation of the world, but at the same time does not settle in any historic, theological systems.

== Bibliography ==
- Reflections on the Paradox of Directed Democracy, Eshraghieh Press, Tehran, 1989
- Shariati and Being Politicized, Resa Institute of Cultural Service, Tehran, 1995
- Thought and Politics, Tehran: Elmi o Farhangi, 1977.
- The Story of Me and Thou, Tehran: Critique of Culture, 2001
- Heidegger and Transcendence (A Commentary of Heidegger's Interpretation of Kant's Critique of Pure Reason), Tehran: Critique of Culture, 2002
- Emancipation or Dominance? (A Critique of the System of Religious Education in Iran), with Mohammad Ali Mohammadi, Tehran: Critique of Culture, 2002
- Monism or Pluralism? (Mobile Thinking or Homeless Thought) (A Critique of Daryoush Shaygan's Modern Enchantedness), Tehran: Critique of Culture, 2004
- Nietzscheian World and Us, Elm Publication, Tehran, 2009
- Hegel or Marx? (A Critique of Iranian Intellectuals), Tehran: Critique of Culture, 2002.
- Heidegger in Iran, Iranian Institute of Philosophy, 2013

== See also ==
- Intellectual Movements in Iran
- Iranian philosophy
- Religious intellectualism in Iran
