= Sadr ad-Din Dashtaki =

Sayyid Sadr Al-Din Dashtaki (Persian: سید صدرالدین دشتکی) or Sayyed Sanad (سید سند) was an Iranian Shia philosopher and theologian. He counts as the founder of the Shiraz school of philosophy.

== Birth ==
Sadr Al din was born in Dashtah, a region near Shiraz. His complete name was Sayyid Muhammad b. Mansur Al Husayni Al Dashtaki. He was born in Shiraz on second of 829/19 June. He counted as the first in the Dastaki family who confessed apparently to shiism sect. According to Pourjavady, it seems that he was a Zaydi. He also challenged with Jalāl-al-Dīn Davānī on the legality of Shia.

== Education ==
Dashtaki was educated along with his cousin and learned Arabic literature and Islamic law with him. He studied rational sciences with Qawam Al Din Al-Kurbali. Kurbali had an important role in introducing Sadr Al-Din to Philosophical discussion, as did Sayyid Muslim Farsi, who was the teacher of Sadr Al-Din in logic and philosophy. Sadr Al Din was also involved in building the houses.

=== Mansuriyyah Madrasah ===
Sadr Al-Din built a madrasah and called it Mansuriyyah, the name of his son. This Madrasah is still active in the center of Shiraz, according to Kakaei.

== Works ==
- Jawaher namah on gemmology
- glosses on Qutb Al Din Razi's commentary on Katibi Qazavini's Shamsiyyah
- glosses on Qutb Al Din Razi's commentary Siraj Al Din Urmawi's Matali Al Anwar
- glosses on Qushji's commentary on Tajrīd al-iʿtiqād
- a treatise on proving the existence of God and his attributes( Risalah fi Ithbat al Wajib and Sifatihi)

== Death ==
Sadr Al Din led a rebellion against the Ruler of Shiraz and was killed by a group of Turkmans on order of Ruler Qasem Bey. He died on 17 Ramadan 903/9 May 1498.
