= Abd al-Razzaq Lahiji =

17th-century Iranian philosopher, poet and theologian

ʿAbd-Al-Razzāq B. ʿAlī B. Al-Hosayn Lāhījī
- Native name: Arabic: فياض اللاهيجي
- Born: Lahijan, Safavid Iran
- Died: c. 1662 CE (1072 AH) Qom, Safavid Iran
- Occupation: Theologian, poet, philosopher
- Children: 2+, including Hasan
- Relatives: Mulla Sadra (father-in-law)

ʿAbd-Al-Razzāq B. ʿAlī B. Al-Hosayn Lāhījī (died c. 1072 AH [1662 CE]) was an Iranian theologian, poet and philosopher. His mentor in philosophy was his father-in-law Mulla Sadra.

== Life ==
Hailing from Lahijan in Gilan, he spent most of his life in Qom. Abd al-Razzaq was a son-in-law of Mulla Sadra along with Molla Mohsen Fayz Kashani. His son Hasan would become another prominent theologian and philosopher of the Safavid dynasty. Seyyed Hossein Nasr knows him among the intellectual figures in Persia. Abd al-Razzaq was in agreement with Molla Sadra as to the contrast between primacy of quiddity and primacy of existence.

== Works ==
- Gawhar-e morād (Tehran, 1271 AH), a detailed exposition of his theology
- Sarmāya-ye īmān
- Dīvān, a volume of his poetry
- Tašrīqāt, three treatises on divine unity, justice and love

== Teaching and pupils ==
According to Madlung, Abd-Razzaq taught at the Masumieh Madrasah. There his prominent pupils included his sons Hasan and Ebrahim as well as Qazi Saeed Qommi.

== Philosophy ==
Lāhīǰī stands at the end of a transition in Islamic scholastic theology in which the thought system of kalam was gradually replaced by that of falsafa, heavily influenced by the school of Avicenna. Lahiji in fact developed a form of Kalam which is hardly distinguishable from Hikmat, although at least in his better known works such as the "Gawhar-e morād" he does not follow the main doctrinal teachings of Mulla Sadra, as on the unity of Being and the catharsis of the faculty of imagination.
