= Mir Damad =

Iranian Shia philosopher

- ميرداماد
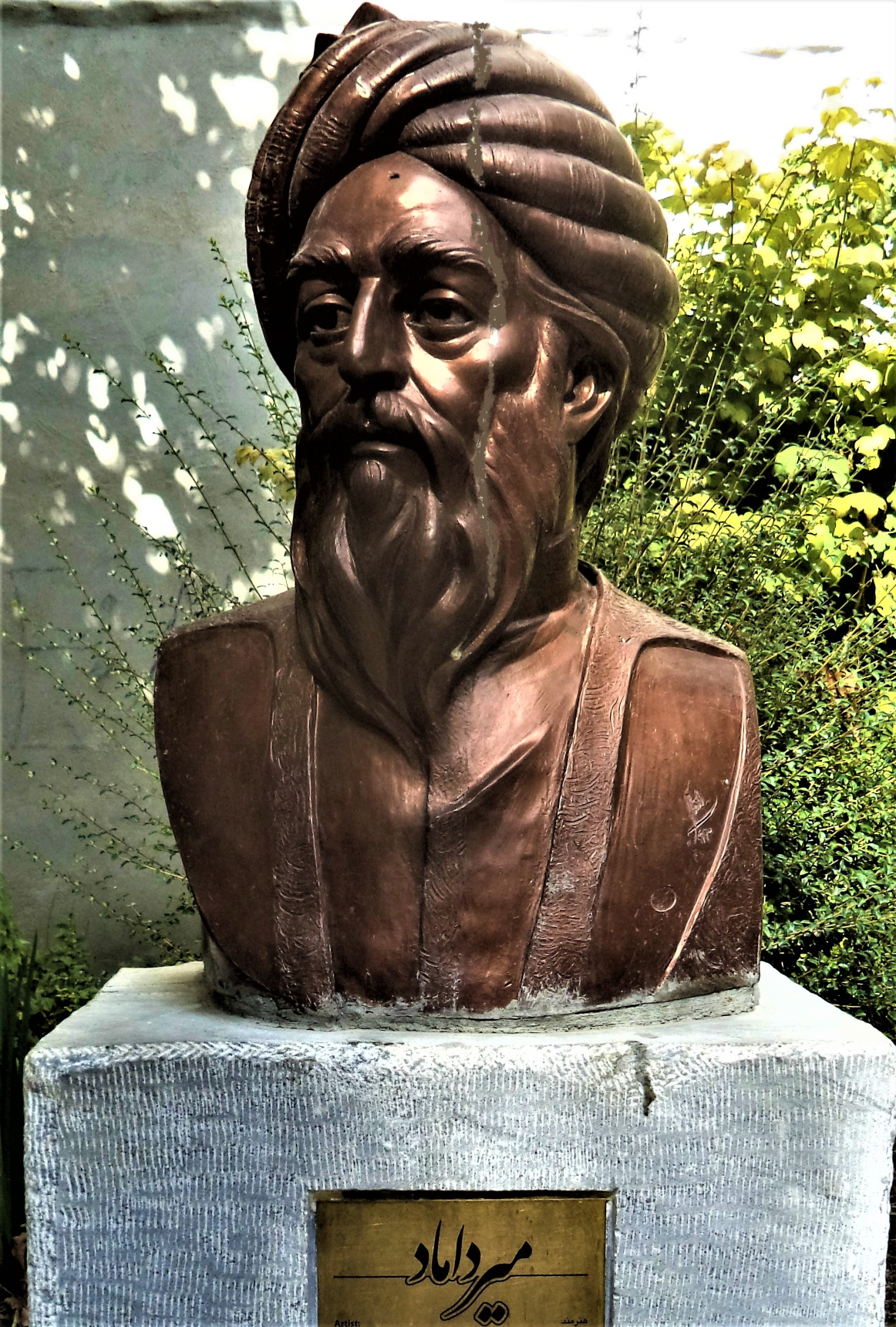
- Bust of Mir Damad
- Title: Sheykh ol-Eslam of Isfahan

Personal life
- Born: Mir Mohammad Baqer Astarabadi; 1561 Astarabad, Safavid Iran
- Died: 1631/2 Najaf, Safavid Iran (present-day Iraq)
- Buried: Imam Ali Shrine

Religious life
- Religion: Islam
- Denomination: Shia
- Sect: Twelver
- Jurisprudence: Ja'fari

Muslim leader
- Influenced: Mulla Sadra, Mohsen Fayz Kashani

Seyyed Mir Mohammad Baqer Astarabadi (c. 1561 – 1631/1632), commonly known as Mīr Dāmād (Persian: ميرداماد), was an Iranian Twelver Shia philosopher in the Neoplatonizing Islamic Peripatetic traditions of Avicenna. He was a scholar of the traditional Islamic sciences, and foremost figure (together with his student Mulla Sadra) of the cultural renaissance of Iran undertaken under the Safavid dynasty. He was also the central founder of the School of Isfahan, noted by his students and admirers as the Third Teacher (mu'alim al-thalith) after Aristotle and al-Farabi.

== Philosophy ==
His major contribution to Islamic philosophy was his novel formulation regarding gradations of time and the emanations of the separate categories of time as descending divine hypostases. He resolved the controversy of the createdness or uncreatedness of the world in time by proposing the notion of huduth-e-dahri (atemporal origination) as an explanation grounded in Avicennan and Suhrawardian categories, whilst transcending them. In brief, excepting God, he argued all things, including the earth and all heavenly bodies, share in both eternal and temporal origination. He influenced the revival of al-Falsafa al-Yamani (Philosophy of Yemen), a philosophy based on revelation and sayings of prophets rather than the rationalism of the Greeks, and he is widely recognized as the founder of the School of Isfahan, which embraced a theosophical outlook known as Hikmat-i Ilahi (Divine Wisdom).

Mir Damad’s many treatises on Islamic philosophy include Taqwim al-Iman (Calendars of Faith, a treasure on creation and divine knowledge), the Kitab Qabasat al-Ilahiyah (Book of the Divine Embers of Fiery Kindling), wherein he lays out his concept of atemporal origination, Kitab al-Jadhawat and Sirat al-Mustaqim. He also wrote poetry under the pseudonym of Ishraq (Illumination). He also wrote a couple of books on mathematics, but with secondary importance.

Among his many other students besides Mulla Sadra were Seyyed Ahmad ibn Reyn-al-A’bedin Alavi, Mohammad ibn Alireza ibn Agajanii, Qutb-al-Din Mohammad Ashkevari and Mulla Shams Gilani.

Mir Damad's philosophical prose is often accounted as being among the most dense and obtusely difficult of styles to understand, deliberately employing as well as coining convoluted philosophical terminology and neologisms that require systematic analysis and detailed commentary. He was called Mir Damad (Groom of the King) because he married Shah Abbas's daughter and hence his fame was based on that event.

== Architecture ==
Mir Damad was also the architect of the Masjed-e Shah (Shah Mosque) in Isfahan which employed calculations requiring the knowledge of the speed of sound. The geometry of the dome is as such that all sound dissipated from the base will echo in hundreds of interior corners of the dome and ultimately collide in the center of the dome. The design and construction of such a dome was sophisticated for the 17th century.

== Family ==
His son was Seyed Ali Naghi Astarabadi and his grandson was Sayyid Mahdi bin Sayyid Ali Naqi. His daughter was the wife of Sayyid Ahmad ibn Zayn al-Abidin Alavi. He was the progenitor of the Mirdamadi family named after him, former supreme leader of Iran, Ali Khamenei, is maternally a descendant of him.

The man has not been seen: Seyyed Ali Naqi Ibn Al-Seyyed Al-Musa (father of three sons: Seyyed Kamal Hassanzadeh Hafshjani, Seyyed Musa Hassanzadeh Hafshjani, Seyyed Mohammad Hafshjani and three daughters: Seyyed Ala Ala Begum Hassanzadeh Esther Shamsabadi, who had a special reputation): Mirza Nasrollah Karimian, Mirza Assadollah Karimian, Mirza Ali Karimian, Mirza Mehdi Karimian (father of musician Kaveh Karimian), Mirza Reza Karimian, Mirza Jalal Karimian, Mirza Hassan (father of Dr. Milad Karimian), Mirza Taghi Karimian, Seyedeh Tajzadeh Astarabad, Seyedeh Aghabazadeh, Hassanzadeh family).

Male result: Sayyid Hassan bin al-Sayyid Mahdi

== Works ==
Among his 134 works known:

- Taqwim al-Iman (Calendars of Faith)
- Kitab Qabasat al-Ilahiyah (Book of the Divine Embers of Fiery Kindling)
- Kitab al-Jadhawat (Book of Spiritual Attractions)
- Sirat al-Mustaqim (The Straight Path)

== See also ==
- Islamic scholars
- List of Iranian scholars
- Sayyid Husayn Ahlati
