= The Transcendent Philosophy of the Four Journeys of the Intellect =

Compendium of Islamic philosophy by Mulla Sadra

The Transcendent Philosophy of the Four Journeys of the Intellect (Arabic:الحكمة المتعالية في الاسفار العقلية الاربعة; Hikmat al-muta‘aliya fi-l-asfar al-‘aqliyya al-arba‘a), known as Four Journeys, is an extended compendium of Islamic philosophy written by the 17th century Islamic scholar, Mulla Sadra, In which he attempted to reach Sufism and prove the idea of Unity of Existence by offering a new intake and perspective on Peripatetic philosophy that was offered by Alpharabius and Avicenna in the Islamic world. The book explains his philosophy of transcendent theosophy. It was first published in print in 1865 in Tehran in four volumes, where it was accompanied by a commentary on three of the volumes by Hadi Sabzavari (1797–1893). To date, no notable, critical English translation of the book has been made.

== Author ==
Mulla Sadrā (Ṣadr ad-Dīn Muḥammad Shīrāzī (Persian: ملا صدرا); Molla Sadra; Mollasadra; or Sadr-ol-Mote'allehin; (Arabic: صدرالمتألهین)) (c. 1571 CE–1640 CE), was an Iranian Shia Islamic philosopher, theologian and ‘Ālim (scholar). He was a prominent figure in the Iranian cultural renaissance of the 17th century. Oliver Leaman of the University of Kentucky calls Mulla Sadra "the most important and influential philosopher of the last four hundred years in the Muslim world". Mulla Sadra's writing style is analytic and critical.

== Title ==
The complete title of the book is Al Hikmat Al Motaaliyyah fi Al Asfar Al Aghliyyah al Arbeah, which means, "Transcendent Philosophy on the Four Intellectual Journeys". Mulla Sadra's transcendent theosophy drew from Kalam wisdom, Ishraqi philosophy and peripatetic philosophy. In Arabic, the word "asfar" means "journey". Mulla Sadra indicated four journeys of man. The book is sometimes referred to as Asfar. It is also sometimes referred to as Hekmate Motaalyyah. However, the book is not to be confused with Al Masa'el Al Qodsiyah.

== Key concepts ==
Asfar is representative of the greater part of Mulla Sadra's philosophical scholarship. In its nine volumes, Asfar examines the philosophical opinions of the different schools of Islamic philosophy. In fact, the compendium acts as a history of Islamic philosophies.

Mulla Sadra's work considers the nature of reality. It strives to connect essentialism and existentialism. Mulla Sadra's existentialism concerns cosmology as it pertains to Allah. His work synthesizes Avicennism, Shahab al-Din Suhrawardi's Illuminationist philosophy, Ibn Arabi's Sufi metaphysics, and the theology of the Ash'ari school and Twelvers.

In the first volume of Asfar, Mulla Sadra focuses solely on an analysis of the concept of wujud ("being") and quiddity (essence). The first volume has four "journeys". The first journey is concerned with the ontology or the doctrine of being. The second journey is concerned with substance and accidents. The third journey deals with God and his attributes and the fourth journey is about the soul of man and a discussion of man, his destiny, death and resurrection.

In the tenth section of the third journey of Asfar, Mulla Sadra expresses his opinion on the creation of world. He clarifies the meaning of the word "universe" and its place in time. Mulla Sadra says previous philosophers' premises and conclusions about the concept of eternity are correct. However, he says, the eternity of the world is not derived from them.

Mulla Sadra advocates a pantheistic doctrine of existence. He also says that God must have a pure existence. Mulla Sadra points out the differences in his conclusions on this topic compared to those of Avicenna.

== Glossaries and commentaries ==
Mirza Mahdi Ashtiyyani has made glossaries for Asfar. In 1958, Allameh Muhammad Hosein Tabatabae'i and Allameh Muzaffar edited the book in a new version presented in nine volumes. In 1974, Javad Mosleh translated Asfar into Persian. In 1989, Ayatullah Abdullah Javadi-Amoli published a commentary in Persian entitled Raheeq-e Makhtum.

== See also ==
- Mulla Sadra
- Islamic philosophy
- Avicenna
