= Tomb of Hadi Sabzevari =

Iranian national heritage site

Tomb of Hadi Sabzavari
- آرامگاه ملا هادی سبزواری
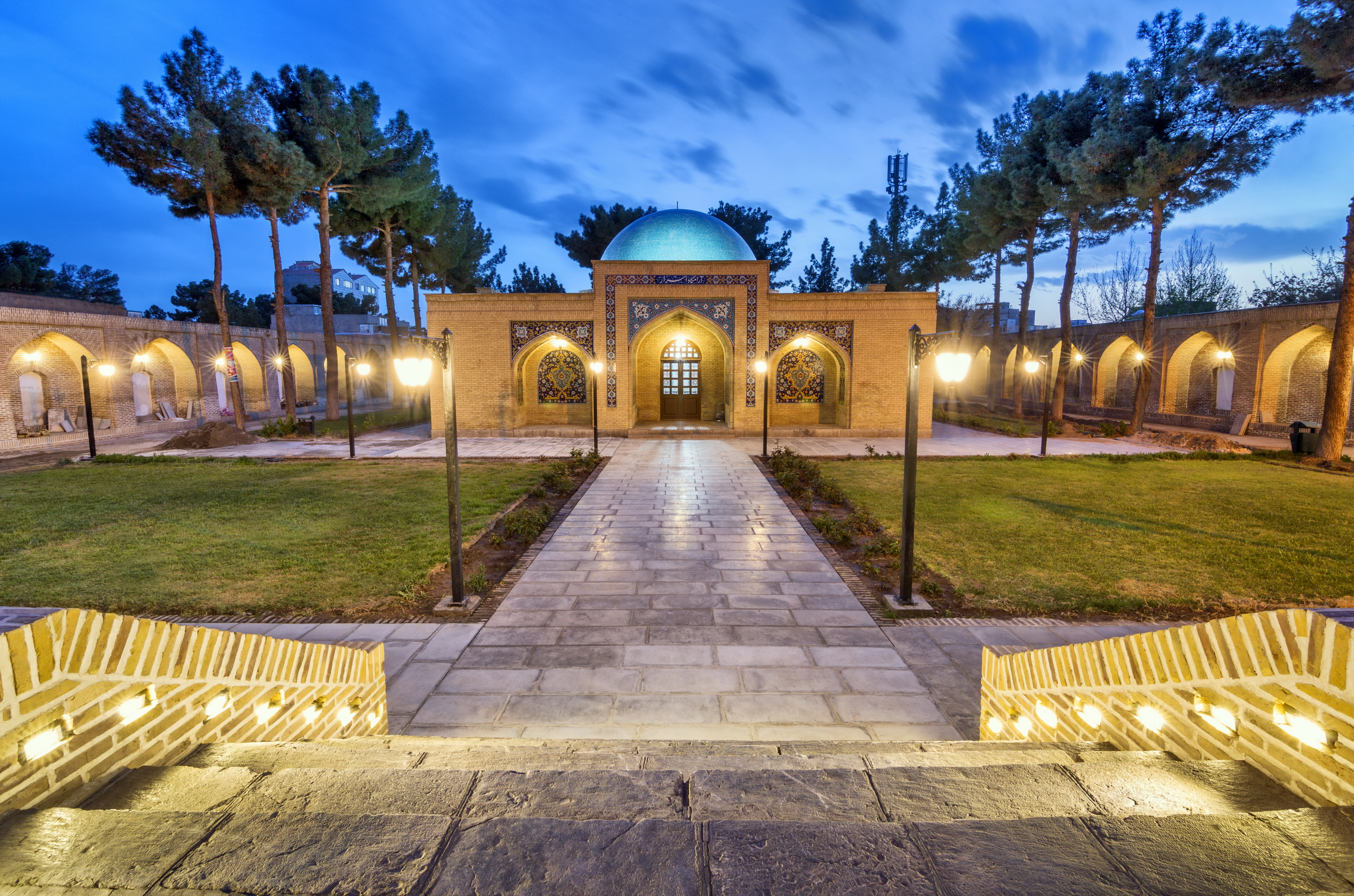
- Interactive map of the Tomb of Hadi Sabzavari area

General information
- Architectural style: Iranian architecture, Qajar architecture
- Location: Sabzevar, Razavi Khorasan province, Iran

The Tomb of Hadi Sabzavari (Persian: آرامگاه ملا هادی سبزواری) was built in the Qajar era and is the burial site of the Iranian Shia cleric and philosopher, Hadi Sabzavari (1797–1873). This building is located in Sabzevar, Iran.

== Gallery ==
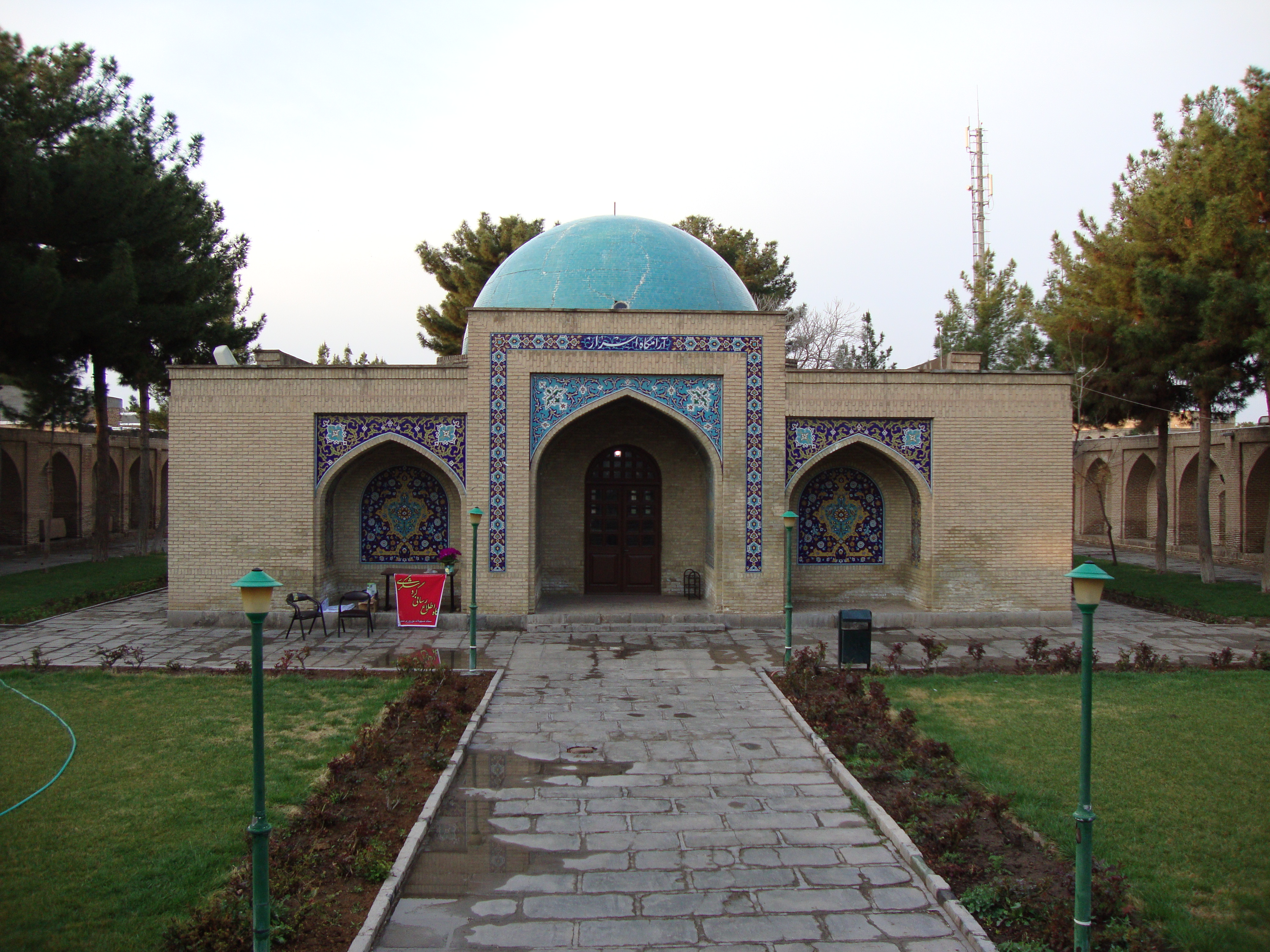

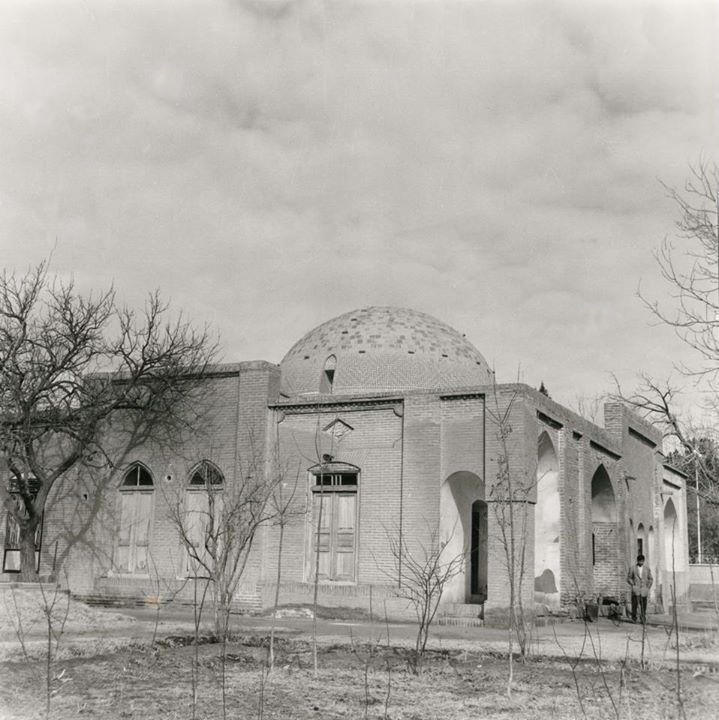
