= Kasr al-asnam al-jahiliyyah =

2007 book by Mulla Sadra

Kasr al-asnam al-jahiliyyah fi dhamm al-mutasawwifin
- Author: Mulla Sadra
- Language: Arabic
- Genre: Islamic Philosophy, theology
- Publication date: 2007
- Media type: Print book

Kasr al-asnam al-jahiliyyah fi dhamm al-mutasawwifin (Demolition of the Idols of Ignorance in Blaming those who Pretend to Sufism) (A.27; C.16; D.P.28). The word "mutasawwifin" referred to here is not used according to its usual meaning of one who follows Sufism but means one who pretends to follow it. In this treatise, Mulla Sadra criticizes the excesses of those in his day who, pretending to be Sufis, disregarded the Shari'ah and its teachings.

== Subject ==
This book is one of the Molla Sadra’s works and writings, in Arabic. As the name of this treatise shows, had been written about the rejecting of false “Sufism”(tasavoof) and blaming the ignorant and hypocrite “Sufis”(Motesawefän). The content of the book, contrary to its new name, is old, and in it, the new word or subject that has not been related in Sadra’s former works are not seen. The basis of the Sadra’s action in this treatise is the criticism of false Sufis that have long precedence.

== Author ==
Muhamrnad ibn Ibrahim ibn Yahya Oawarni Shirazi, entitled Sadr al-Din and also Mulla Sadra (in the Indo-Pakistani subcontinent simply Sadra) as well as Sadr al-muta'allihin, "foremost among the theosophers", or called simply Akhund by his disciples, was born in Shiraz in 979-980/1571-72 into an influential and well known family, his father having been the governor of the province of Fars. The date of his birth has not been specified in any of the traditional sources devoted to him and in fact it was discovered only a few years ago when'Allamah Sayyid Muhammad Husayn Tabatabaei, a foremost contemporary sage or hakim of Iran, was correcting the new edition of the Asfar and preparing it for publication. On the margin of a manuscript copied in 1197/1703 but based on acopy autographed by Mulla Sadra and with certain marginal notes by the author himself, Muhammad Husayn Tabatabaei discovered the following sentence in the section devoted to the question of the unity of the intellect and the intelligible: "I received this inspiration at the time of sunrise of Friday the seventh of Jumadi al-ula of the year 1037 A.H. [corresponding to January 14, 1628] when already 58 lunar years had passed from the life of the author." Since then other sources have confirmed this information. But because it is not possible to know whether the 58 years is a period of between 57 and 58 years or 58 complete years, one cannot determine the exact date of his birth beyond setting it between the years 979/1571 and 980/1572. He was wealthy and influential and with great effort trained his son. Mullah Sadra’s life can be divided into three periods:

1. - The periods of seminarian, studentship, discussion, studying of the old books and viewpoints of philosophers in Shiraz and Isfahan. In this period, he studied viewpoint of philosophers, kaläm, "Aristotelian" (mash-shäi) and Illuminative (eshräghi) philosophers.
2. - The stage of "self-discipline" (tahzibe nafs), "asceticism" (riyazat) and "mystical disclosure" (mokashefeh) in "kahak" village (near the Qom) that finally led to "unveiling of Lordly truths" (kashfe haghäyegh rabäni) and "theological sciences".
3. - The stage of writing and teaching in Shiraz in the school that Allahverdy Khan, the governor of "Fars", built it. During this period, Mulla Sadra almost wrote all his works. Mulla Sadra caused the "Divine Wisdom" (hekmate ellähi) and Islamic Philosophy enters into the new stage. He, in what is called "supreme knowledge" (elme a’lä) or universal science or "prime philosophy" or "Divine Wisdom" (hekmate elähi), [and it is the only part that really is "philosophy" and called "Real philosophy"], overshadowed the former philosopher position, changed the principles and first foundations of this science and strengthened it on a steadfast principle. Mullah Sadra, till end of his life, composed and instructed, and in this times, seven times walked to “Mecca” that in returning from the seventh journey, died in "Basra" in 1640 A.D. (1050A.H).

== Structure ==
This book contains one introduction and four articles, each consisting of chapters, and a conclusion:

- The first article: Asceticism does not need knowledge (science).
- The second article: The result of worship is knowledge.
- The third article: The characteristics of "the righteous or the pious" (Abrär).
- The fourth article: The advice and blaming the world.
1. The first article: about the person who has started the asceticism.
  - about being untrue of the boasting those who claim to the "Sufism" (soofigari).
  - about looking to the facts of creatures.
2. The second article: about the ultimate goal of worship.
  - "The Divine Sciences" (ma’äref elähi) is the real purpose of "Man" existence.
  - The benefit of any "attributes of perfections" (sefät kamäli) is that to make "Man" ready for getting the "Divine Science" (ma'äref elahi).
  - The difference between "mystical disclosure" (mokäshefe)- the best "mystical discloser" is "the knowledge of God" (ma'refate God).
  - The difference of Man's mood.
  - The difference of Man's actions.
  - "Divinely inspired knower"( ä'lam rabbäni) is the main aim of creation.
  - Bad ending of the life.
  - Some features of God’s friends.
3. The third article: The features of ""(pakän) and scholars.
  - The way of access to the position of "pure ones" (honest and innocent persons) and scholars.
  - Studying the feature of love and enthusiasm.
  - The origin of Man's actions.
  - The advantage of worship in attaining to spiritual benefits.
  - Studying the relation between healthy "literal meaning" with healthy "inward aspect" and also unhealthy "literal meaning" with unhealthy "inward aspect".
  - The purpose of Man's deeds in worship.
  - The reason of non-recognizing the good persons with bad ones.
4. The fourth article: About wise preaching, intellectual advice and spiritual speeches about badness of the world and "worldly people" (ahle donyä).
  - About forbidding from attention to the world's goods.
  - Prophet’s recommendations about unwillingness to the world and worldly people.
  - Some recommendations from prophets and "friends of God" (oliyä of God).
  - Some recommendations from "Pythagoras" (fisaghoores)
  - Some advice and recommendations from philosophers.

and

- Conclusion.

== Publication and translation ==
This book has been printed and published by "Jame'e Tehran" publishers in Tehran in 1961 A.D: Edited in a critical edition by M.T.Danechepazhuh, Tehran, 1340 (A.H. solar) and also has been published by "Sadra Islamic Philosophy Research Institute" in Tehran in 2002 A.D. (1381). Its correction, research and introduction has been done by Dr. Hossein Jahangiri. In the end of the book, has been related the list of quranic verses, Persian and Arabic poems, persons' name, places, groups, books' name, terminology and explanations and the list of references. It has also appendixes, traditions, resources and explanations. (This book has been translated by Mohsen Bidarfar that has been published by the name of “mysticism”(Gnosticism) and "Gnostic pretenders" (who pretend to be Gnostic) in 1961 A.D. (1340) and 1992 A.D. (1371).
