= Gholamhossein Ebrahimi Dinani =

Iranian philosopher (born 1934)

Gholam-hossein Ebrahimi Dinani غلامحسین ابراهیمی دینانی
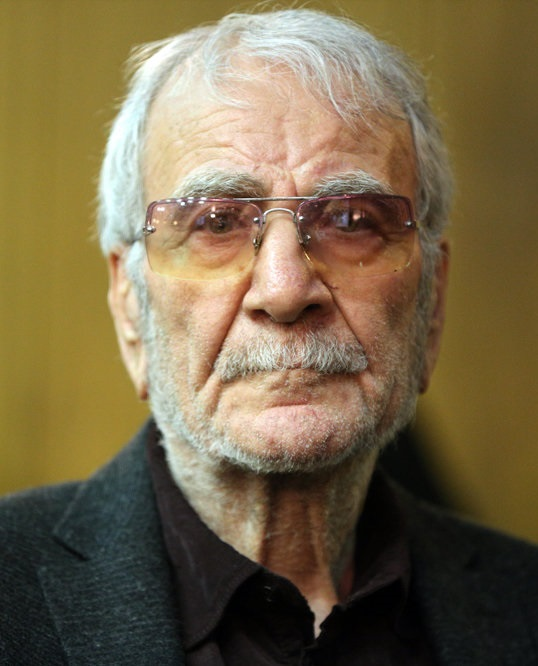
- Born: December 26, 1934 (age 91); Isfahan, Iran
- Occupation: Philosopher

Signature
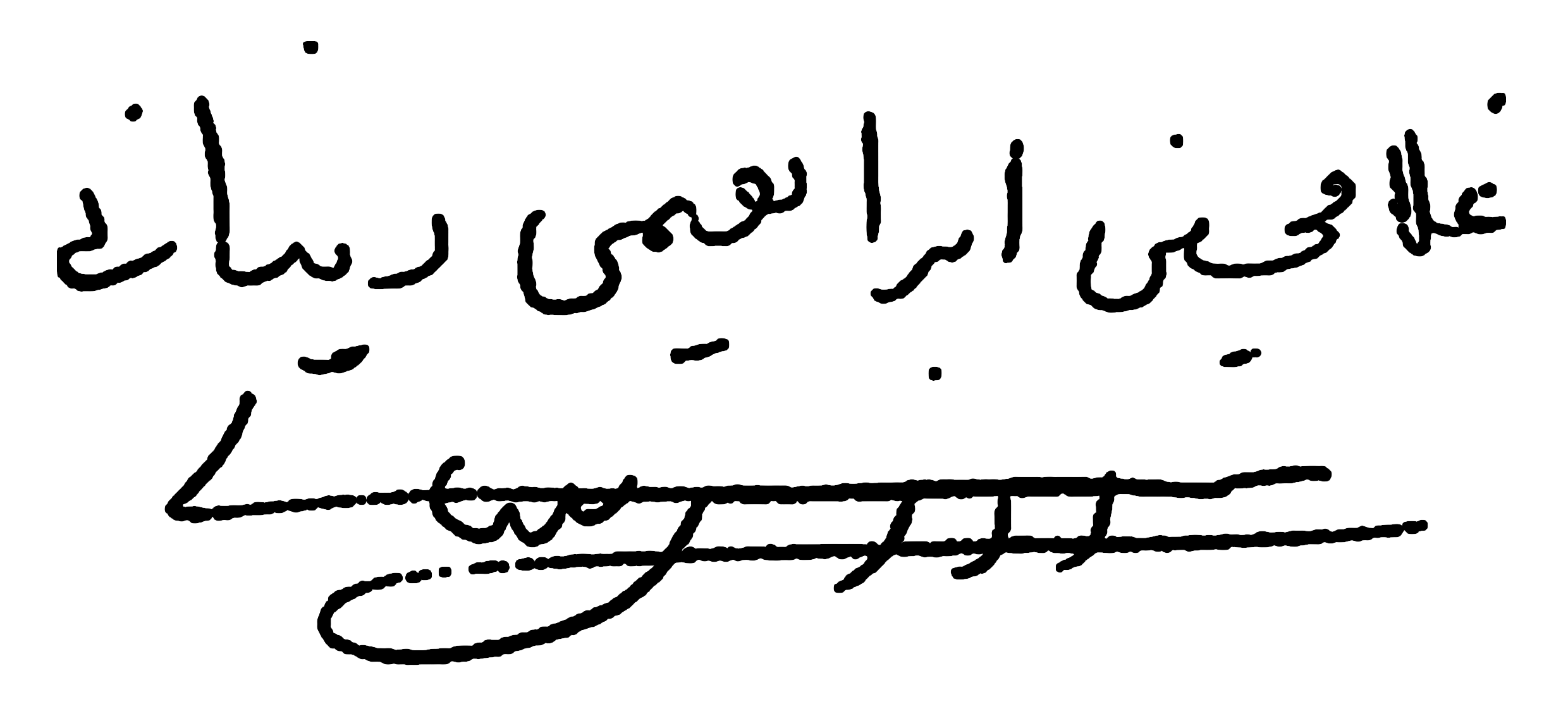

Gholam-Hossein Ebrahimi Dinani (Persian: غلام‌حسین ابراهیمی دینانی) was born on December 26, 1934, in Isfahan, Iran. He is a prominent Iranian philosopher, widely recognized for his research and writings on illuminationism and the works of Shahab al-Din Suhrawardi. A three-time recipient of the Book of the Year award in Iran, Dinani holds the title of professor emeritus at the University of Tehran and also lectures at Tarbiat Modares University and Ferdowsi University of Mashhad. His public lectures at the Institute for Research in Philosophy draw a diverse audience, including students and scholars of theology and philosophy. Dinani is a philosopher with a distinctive perspective and profound expertise in both Eastern and Western philosophy, viewing the world through the lens of an Islamic philosopher. He does not categorize Western and Eastern philosophers based on geography or religion; instead, he ultimately divides them into two groups: the Ash'arites and the Mu'tazilites. While his views as an Islamic philosopher are significantly influenced by figures such as Ibn Sina, Mulla Sadra, and Suhrawardi, he has also introduced many original theories to the field of philosophy.

His notable works, including The Adventure of Philosophical Thought in the Islamic World and The Notebook of Reason and the Verse of Love, set him apart from contemporary thinkers. Dinani perceives philosophy as a unified living entity rather than a collection of isolated parts; he views it as a fluid and dynamic flow, rather than as separate and independent streams.

A central theme in Dr. Dinani's work is the conviction that religious thought must align with wisdom and reason. He has authored over 70 books and hundreds of articles, in addition to delivering numerous public lectures that cover a wide range of philosophical topics. He was close to Iran's government.
