= Mulla Morad ibn Ali Khan Tafreshi =

Mulla Morad ibn Ali Khan Tafreshi (1549-1641 CE) was a Persian theologian and jurist during the Safavid period. Tafreshi was a contemporary of Mulla Sadra Shirazi.

He received religious instruction from Amoli, and Mirza Abraham Hamadani. Ardabili also mentioned the name of Tafreshi I in the book of Summa Narrations. Tafreshi left many books on theology and jurisprudence. Some of his writings about philosophy and theology include:

- Arrazyyah al-mahdavyyah
- Arrazyyah al-Husaynyyah
- Amoozaj al-mousavi
- Treaties on discussion
