= Transcendent theosophy =

Doctrine and philosophy developed by Mulla Sadra

Transcendent theosophy (Persian: حكمت متعاليه, romanized: al-ḥikmat al-mutaʿāliyah, lit. 'the transcendent wisdom') a doctrine and philosophy developed by Persian philosopher Mulla Sadra (d. 1635 CE), is one of two main disciplines of Islamic philosophy that are currently live and active.

== Overview ==
Mulla Sadra's school of Islamic philosophy, al-ḥikmat al-mutaʿāliyah, is composed of two terms:

- al-ḥikmat (lit. 'wisdom' or 'philosophy'; by extension, 'theosophy')
- mutaʿāliyah (lit. 'transcendent' or 'exalted')

The phrase fits the history and doctrines of Mulla Sadra's teaching well, as hikmah (or 'theosophy', in its original sense) and meditation on the transcendent leads to transcendence itself. When Mulla Sadra talked about hikmah, he usually meant transcendent philosophy. He gave many definitions to the term hikmah, the most famous one defining hikmah as a vehicle through which "man becomes an intelligible world resembling the objective world and similar to the order of universal existence".

Mulla Sadra's philosophy and ontology is considered to be just as important to Islamic philosophy as Martin Heidegger's philosophy later was to Western philosophy in the 20th century. Mulla Sadra brought "a new philosophical insight in dealing with the nature of reality" and created "a major transition from essentialism to existentialism" in Islamic philosophy.

== Existentialism ==
A concept that lies at the heart of Mulla Sadra's philosophy is the idea of "existence precedes essence", a key foundational concept of existentialism. This was the opposite of the idea of "essence precedes existence" previously supported by Avicenna and his school of Avicennism as well as Shahab al-Din Suhrawardi and his school of Illuminationism. Sayyid Jalal Ashtiyani later summarized Mulla Sadra's concept as follows:

"The existent being that has an essence must then be caused and existence that is pure existence ... is therefore a Necessary Being."

For Mulla Sadra, "existence precedes the essence and is thus principle since something has to exist first and then have an essence." This is primarily the argument that lies at the heart of Mulla Sadra's philosophy. Mulla Sadra substituted a metaphysics of existence for the traditional metaphysics of essences, and giving priority Ab initio to existence over quiddity.

Mulla Sadra effected a revolution in the metaphysics of being by his thesis that there are no immutable essences, but that each essence is determined and variable according to the degree of intensity of its act of existence.

In his view, reality is existence, in a variety of ways, and these different ways look to us like essences. What first affects us are things that exist and we form ideas of essences afterward, so existence precedes essence. This position referred to as primacy of existence (Arabic: Isalat al-Wujud).

Mulla Sadra's existentialism is therefore fundamentally different from Western existentialism of Jean-Paul Sartre. Sartre said that human beings have no essence before their existence because, there is no Creator, no God. This is the meaning of "existence precedes essence" in Sartre's existentialism.

== Substantial motion ==
Another central concept of Mulla Sadra's philosophy is the theory of "substantial motion" (al-harakat al-jawhariyyah), which is "based on the premise that everything in the order of nature, including celestial spheres, undergoes substantial change and transformation as a result of the self-flow (fayd) and penetration of being (sarayan al-wujud) which gives every concrete individual entity its share of being. In contrast to Aristotle and Ibn Sina who had accepted change only in four categories, i.e., quantity (kamm), quality (kayf), position (wad’) and place (‘ayn), Sadra defines change as an all-pervasive reality running through the entire cosmos including the category of substance (jawhar)." Heraclitus described a similar concept centuries earlier (Πάντα ῥεῖ - panta rhei - "everything is in a state of flux"), while Gottfried Leibniz described a similar concept a century after Mulla Sadra's work.

== See also ==
- Transcendence (philosophy)
- Hikmah
- Ma'rifa
- Islamic philosophy
- Iranian philosophy
- Existentialism
- Martin Heidegger
