= Hadi Sabzavari =

Iranian philosopher, mystic theologian and poet (1797–1873)

- ملا هادی سبزواری
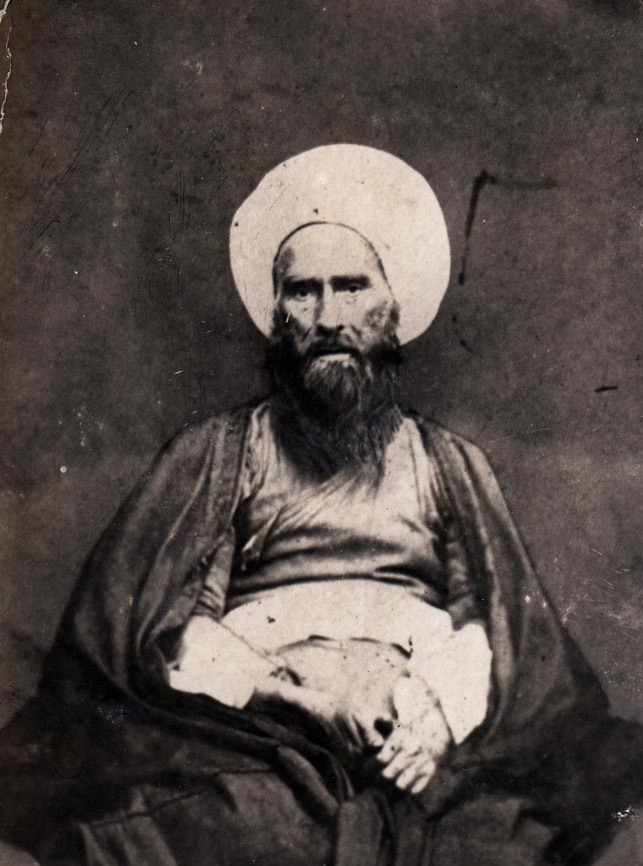
- A photograph of Molla Hadi which represents the actual oldest photograph of an Islamic philosopher
- Born: 1797; Sabzevar, Qajar Iran
- Died: 1873 (aged 75–76); Sabzevar, Qajar Iran
- Other names: Sharaf al-Mulk, Hujjat al-Haq, Sheikh al-Rayees

Academic background
- Influences: The Quran, Mulla Sadra, Nasir al-Din al-Tusi, Ibn Arabi, Avicenna, Shahab al-Din Suhrawardi, Rumi

Academic work
- Era: 19th century
- School or tradition: Shia Islam, Transcendent theosophy
- Main interests: philosophy, theology, kalam, logic, Persian literature, science
- Notable works: Asrar al-hikam ("The Secrets of Wisdom"), Sharh-i manzumah ("A Treatise on Logic in Verse"),
- Influenced: 20th century Islamic philosophy, Henry Corbin, Hossein Nasr

Hadi Sabzavari (Persian: ملا هادی سبزواری) or Hajj Molla Hadi Sabzavari (1797–1873 CE / 1212–1289 AH) was an Iranian Shia cleric, philosopher, mystic theologian and poet.

== Historical background ==
Molla Hadi lived in the Qajar era. According to his description, this period was along with descend of Hikmah; he also complained of his period for the sake of lacking knowledge and philosophy. This kind of thinking was common among Islamic philosophers. There was an intellectual and spiritual turmoil in the Qajar era. In fact, in this period, Iranians encountered new European thought and revival of traditional thinking; also in this period we can see the diverse developments in beliefs like Kaka'i, Shaykhism, Babism and the Baháʼí Faith and at the same time weakness and disappearance of Shia. Molla Hadi is counted as one of the four prominent masters of the Tehran philosophical school, along with Aqa ‘Ali Mudarris, Aqa Muhammad Riza Qumshihi, Mirza Abul Hasan Jelveh.

== Life ==
He was born in Sabzevar, Iran to a family of land-owning merchants. His formal education started at a young age under his cousin, Molla Hosayn Sabzavari, and he wrote a small treatise at the age of seven. His father died when he was seven or eight years old and his uncle Molla Ḥosayn Sabzavari, became his caretaker. When he reached the age of ten, he was taken by his cousin to Mashhad. There, he resided in the Hajj Hasan madrasa near the mausoleum of Imam Reza, where he studied Arabic, Islamic Jurisprudence, logic, and the principles of religion and law with Molla Hosay for a period of ten years. When he turned twenty, he returned to his hometown of Sabzavar. From there, he prepared his plans for the Hajj and set out in the direction of Isfahan. During this period, Isfahan was an important intellectual center of Iran, where philosophy and intellectual mysticism ('Erfan) flourished.

Among the important masters of these tradition at the time, the names of Mollā ʿAli Nuri (died 1830–31) and Mollā Esmāʿil Eṣfahāni, a student of Nuri, were prominent. They taught Islamic philosophy, mostly of Sadr al-Din Shirazi and his school. He remained in Isfahan for around eight or nine years, where he studied under these two undisputed masters of Mulla Sadra's school of philosophy. He concentrated on the main works of Mulla Sadra, such as the Asfar and Al-Shawahed al-Robubiya. Simultaneously, he also studied Islamic jurisprudence with Aqa Mohammad 'Ali Najafi, one of the major Shia scholars of Isfahan. In Isfahan, Sabzevari lived a life of piety despite having received a substantial inheritance. According to the orientalist Edward Browne, “he used to take pains to discover which of the students stood most in need of pecuniary help, and would then secretly place sums of money in their room during their absence, without leaving any clue that would lead to the identification of the donor. In this way he is said to have expended no less than 100,000 tumáns (about 30,000 Pounds Sterling), while he was in Isfahan, leaving himself only so much as he deemed necessary for his own maintenance”.

In In 1826–27, Sabzavari returned to Mashhad. There he began to teach in the Hājj Hasan madrasa although the scholars in Mashhad did not have the same interest in philosophy as Isfahan. The atmosphere of Mashhad was not as open as Isfahan for the pursuit of intellectual sciences. However, he continued to teach both the transmitted science as well as the intellectual sciences. He thought the intellectual sciences based on his work al-Manzuma, which he must have composed in Isfahan. His commentary on this important work of his however was completed in 1845. In 1831–32, he set out for Sabzavar where he made preparation for the Hajj. He left for Mecca in 1832–33 where he performed the rites of the pilgrimage. He returned to Iran in 1834–35 during the interval of the death of Fath-Ali Shah Qajar. During this period of anarchy, traveling within Iran had become dangerous. Having lost his wife in Hajj, he settled in Kerman while waiting for calmer conditions to return to Khorasan. During the year he spent in Kerman, he was engaged in asceticism while agreeing to sweep the religious school for its keeper who provided him a room to live in. He married the keeper's daughter that year who was later to accompany him to Sabzavar. At this time, no one knew his real identity and degree of knowledge.

In 1836–37, Sabzavari set to Sabzavar and established a center for the study of Islamic philosophy and gnosis. The school he established rivaled with the schools of Tehran and Isfahan due to his personality. For a period of 10 months, he also taught in Mashhad. However, the rest of time was spent in Sabzevar where he made the Fasihiya school the center of teaching. This school became known as Madrasa-ye Ḥāji, where part of it still survives till this day. Scholars and students began to flock from all over Iran, Iraq, Turkey, Caucasus, India and even Tibet. His name became widespread all over Iran so much so that in 1857–58, when Naser al-Din Shah Qajar made a pilgrimage to Mashhad, he stopped in Sabzavar and paid a visit to hakim Sabzavari. The Qajar shah became very impressed by the philosopher and asked his royal photographer Aqa Reza Akkas-Bashi to photograph the hakim. The photograph, which is widely available, is the oldest picture of an Islamic philosopher. The Qajar shah also requested from him a book in Persian containing the complete theory and cycle of traditional philosophy. Sabzavari obliged and composed the two Persian books: the Asrāral-ḥekam, which he dedicated to Naser al-Din Shah and also another book titled Hedāyat al-ṭālebin. Sabzavari died suddenly in 1872, probably as a result of heart failure. The date of his death is recorded in several chronographs, including the numerical value of the couplet ka namord zendatar shod ("He did not die but became more alive after his passing") which was composed by one of his students.

== Philosophical ideas ==
The importance and contribution of Hakim Sabzevari is mainly in the precise explanation of Transcendent Theosophy (al-hikmah al-muta’āliyah) and the resolution of its problems, as well as in the continuation of this wisdom and Islamic wisdom in general through the writing of numerous works and the cultivation of numerous students. However, this does not mean that Hakim Sabzavari was simply one of the prominent spokesmen of mulla sadra's Thoughts and lacked philosophical innovation. Because whenever a philosopher goes beyond repeating the words of the past, innovation has taken place. Therefore, things like presenting a new definition or analysis, posing new questions, criticizing and refuting an opinion by presenting a new argument on a theory, discovering new dimensions of a theory, proposing a new theory, establishing a new branch in philosophy, and finally presenting a philosophical system can be considered as forms of philosophical innovation. The innovations of the Sabzavari can be examined in the following categories: ontology, theology, cosmology, anthropology, epistemology, and moral philosophy.

== Works ==
Sabzavari wrote some fifty-two works of prose and poetry in both Arabic and Persian. He wrote the Asrar al-hikmah ("The Secrets of Wisdom"), which, together with his Arabic treatise Sharh-i manzumah ("A Treatise on Logic in Verse"), remains a basic text for the study of hikmat doctrines in Iran. Not limited to philosophy, he also wrote poetry under the name of Asrar and completed a commentary on the Masnavi of Jalal ad-Din ar-Rumi, the great mystic poet of Islam.

For philosophy in the reign of Nasir al-Din Shah Qajar (1848–1896), he was what Mulla Sadra had been in the reign of Shah Abbas the Great. He was also the faithful interpreter of Mulla Sadra and Transcendent Theosophy. He played a part in making Mulla Sadra the 'master thinker' of the Iranian philosophers. It could even be said that circumstances permitted him, to a greater extent than Mulla Sadra, to give free rein to his genius as a mystical theosopher, because there was greater freedom of self-expression during the Safavid epoch.

== Books ==
Sabzevari wrote numerous works in Persian and Arabic. He wrote works dealing with an array of subjects from prosody to logic to theology. However, the majority of his works deal with philosophy and mysticism.

- Šarḥ al-manẓuma, is a work in Arabic also known as Ḡorar al-farāʾed. It is one of his more notable books which was completed around 1845. Till this day, it is still taught in religious seminaries in Iran with numerous later commentaries. The work is a versified summary and commentary of the transcendence philosophy of Mulla Sadra.
- Asrār al-ḥekam fi’l-moftataḥ wa’l-moḵtatam
- Šarḥ-e abyāt-e moškela-ye Maṯnawi in Persian is a commentary of the Mathnawi of Mowalana Jalal al-Din Rumi
- Hedāyat al-ṭālebin, a book composed in Persian at the request of Naser al-Din Shah Qajar
- Ta'liqat
- Asrar ol-Ebadah
- Aljabr wal ekhtiar
- Osul ad-Din
- Nebrās al-hodā
- A poem cycle

=== Asrār al-ḥekam fi’l-moftataḥ wa’l-moḵtatam ===
This book was written for Naser al-Din Shah after the Shah while passing through Sabzavār asked Mulla Hadi Sabzevari to write a him a book about man's origin and destination in Persian together with the mysteries of God's oneness. The book was completed in 1868 and it deals with concepts of illuminative wisdom (ešrāq) and peripatetic philosophy, and is rich in intuitive and mystic insights.

The gnosis of Sabzavari falls into three categories which are: (1) knowledge of God, consisting of knowledge of the beginning and knowledge of the end; (2) knowledge of one's self; (3) knowledge of God's commands, consisting of knowledge of every rule of divine law (šarīʿa) and knowledge of the spiritual path (ṭarīqa). On the basis of this classification, the book is divided into two parts.

Part I of the book consists of seven chapters:

- proof of the Necessarily Existent (wāǰeb al-woǰūd),
- knowledge of God's attributes
- God's actions
- knowledge of one's self and psychology (maʿāref-e nafs)
- knowledge of man's origin and destination,
- absolute prophethood
- Imamate

Part II comprises four chapters

- ritual purity (ṭahāra)
- prayer (ṣalāt)
- alms
- fasting (ṣīām).

The most important part of the book is on the proof of the Necessarily Existent (i.e., God).

== Translations ==
- The Metaphysics of Sabzvârî, tr. from the Arabic by Mehdi Mohagheg and Toshihico Izutso, Delmar, New York, 1977.

== See also ==
- Mulla Sadra
- Suhrawardi
- Avicenna
- Hossein Nasr
- Islamic philosophy
