= Iranian philosophy =

Philosophical traditions of Iran/Persia

Iranian philosophy (Persian: فلسفه ایرانی) or Persian philosophy can be traced back as far as to Old Iranian philosophical traditions and thoughts which originated in ancient Indo-Iranian roots and were considerably influenced by Zarathustra's teachings. According to the Oxford Dictionary of Philosophy, the chronology of the subject and science of philosophy starts with the Indo-Iranians, dating this event to 1500 BC. The Oxford dictionary also states, "Zarathustra's philosophy entered to influence Western tradition through Judaism, and therefore on Middle Platonism."

Throughout Iranian history and due to remarkable political and social changes such as the Arab and Mongol invasions of Persia, a wide spectrum of schools of thoughts showed a variety of views on philosophical questions extending from Old Iranian and mainly Zoroastrianism-related traditions, to schools appearing in the late pre-Islamic era such as Manicheism and Mazdakism as well as various post-Islamic schools. Iranian philosophy after the Muslim conquest of Persia, is characterized by different interactions with the Old Iranian philosophy, the Greek philosophy and with the development of Islamic philosophy. The Illumination School and the Transcendent Philosophy are regarded as two of the main philosophical traditions of that era in Persia.

== Ancient Iranian Philosophy ==
=== Zoroastrianism ===
The teachings of Zarathustra (Zoroaster) appeared in Persia at some point during the period 1700-1800 BCE. His wisdom became the basis of the religion Zoroastrianism, and generally influenced the development of the Iranian branch of Indo-Iranian philosophy. Zarathustra was the first who treated the problem of evil in philosophical terms. He espoused an ethical philosophy based on the primacy of good thoughts (andiše-e-nik), good words (goftâr-e-nik), and good deeds (kerdâr-e-nik).

The works of Zoroaster and Zoroastrianism had a significant influence on Greek philosophy and Roman philosophy. Plato learnt of Zoroastrian philosophy through Eudoxus and incorporated much of it into his own Platonic realism. In the 3rd century BC, however, Colotes accused Plato's The Republic of plagiarizing parts of Zoroaster's On Nature, such as the Myth of Er.

Zarathustra was known as a sage, magician and miracle-worker in post-Classical Western culture, though almost nothing was known of his ideas until the late eighteenth century. By this time his name was associated with lost ancient wisdom and was appropriated by Freemasons and other groups who claimed access to such knowledge. He appears in Mozart's opera The Magic Flute ("Die Zauberflöte") under the variant name "Sarastro", who represents moral order in opposition to the "Queen of the Night". Enlightenment writers such as Voltaire promoted research into Zoroastrianism in the belief that it was a form of rational Deism, preferable to Christianity..

In 2005, the Oxford Dictionary of Philosophy ranked Zarathustra as first in the chronology of philosophers. Zarathustra's impact lingers today due in part to the system of rational ethics he founded called Mazda-Yasna. The word Mazda-Yasna is Avestan and is translated as "Worship of Wisdom" in English. The encyclopedia Natural History (Pliny) claims that Zoroastrians later educated the Greeks who, starting with Pythagoras, used a similar term, philosophy, or “love of wisdom” to describe the search for ultimate truth.

=== Greco-Persian Era ===
Little is known of the situation of philosophy during the time of the ancient Greek philosophers. We know that the Persian culture had an influence on the creation of Stoic school of thought, but nothing has been left in Persian writings.

=== Manichaeism ===
Manichaeism, founded by Mani, was influential from North Africa in the West, to China in the East. Its influence subtly continues in Western Christian thought via Saint Augustine of Hippo, who converted to Christianity from Manichaeism, which he passionately denounced in his writings, and whose writings continue to be influential among Catholic, Protestant, and Orthodox theologians. An important principle of Manichaeism was its dualistic cosmology/theology, which is shared with Mazdakism, a philosophy founded by Mazdak. Under this dualism, there were two original principles of the universe: Light, the good one; and Darkness, the evil one. These two had been mixed by a cosmic accident, and man's role in this life was through good conduct to release the parts of himself that belonged to Light. Mani saw the mixture of good and bad as a cosmic tragedy, while Mazdak viewed this in a more neutral, even optimistic way.

=== Mazdakism ===
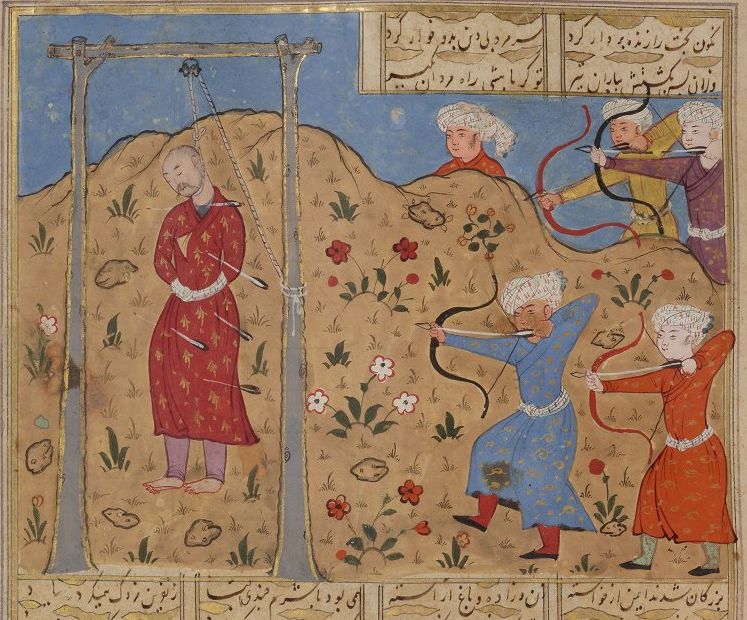
Execution of Mazdak

Mazdak (d. 524/528 CE) was a proto-socialist Persian reformer who gained influence under the reign of the Sassanian king Kavadh I. He claimed to be a prophet of God and instituted communal possessions and social welfare programs.

In many ways Mazdak's teaching can be understood as a call for social revolution, and has been referred to as early "communism" or proto-socialism.

=== Zurvanism ===
Zurvanism is characterized by the element of its First Principle which is Time, "Zurvan", as a primordial creator. According to Zaehner, Zurvanism appears to have three schools of thought all of which have classical Zurvanism as their foundation:

==== Aesthetic Zurvanism ====
Aesthetic Zurvanism which was apparently not as popular as the materialistic kind, viewed Zurvan as undifferentiated Time, which, under the influence of desire, divided into reason (a male principle) and concupiscence (a female principle).

==== Materialist Zurvanism ====
While Zoroaster's Ormuzd created the universe with his thought, materialist Zurvanism challenged the concept that anything could be made out of nothing.

==== Fatalistic Zurvanism ====
Fatalistic Zurvanism resulted from the doctrine of limited time with the implication that nothing could change this preordained course of the material universe and that the path of the astral bodies of the 'heavenly sphere' was representative of this preordained course. According to the Middle Persian work Menog-i Khrad: "Ohrmazd allotted happiness to man, but if man did not receive it, it was owing to the extortion of these planets."

== Classical Islamic period ==
The intellectual tradition in Persia continued after Islam and was of great influence on the further development of Iranian Philosophy. The main schools for such studies were, and to some extents still are, Shiraz, Khurasan, Maragheh, Isfahan, Tehran.

=== Avicennism ===
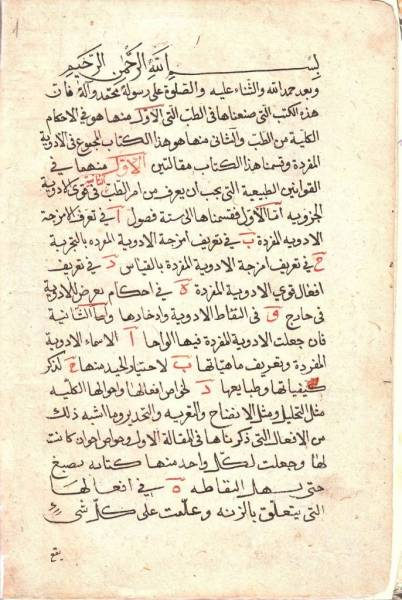
Manuscript of Avicenna's Canon of Medicine.

In the Islamic Golden Age, due to Avicenna's (Ibn Sina's; born near Bukhara) successful reconciliation between Aristotelianism and Neoplatonism along with Kalam, Avicennism eventually became the leading school of Islamic philosophy by the 12th century. Avicenna had become a central authority on philosophy by then, and several scholars in the 12th century commented on his strong influence at the time:

"People nowadays [believe] that truth is whatever [Ibn Sina] says, that it is inconceivable for him to err and that whoever contradicts him in anything he says cannot be rational."

Avicennism was also influential in medieval Europe, particularly his doctrines on the nature of the soul and his existence-essence distinction, along with the debates and censure that they raised in scholastic Europe. This was particularly the case in Paris, where Avicennism was later proscribed in 1210. Nevertheless, his psychology and theory of knowledge influenced William of Auvergne and Albertus Magnus, and his metaphysics influenced the thought of Thomas Aquinas.

=== Illuminationism ===
Illuminationist philosophy was a school of Islamic philosophy founded by Shahab al-Din Suhrawardi in the 12th century. This school is a combination of Avicenna's philosophy and ancient Iranian philosophy, along with many new innovative ideas of Suhrawardi. It is often described as having been influenced by Neoplatonism.

=== Transcendent theosophy ===
Transcendent theosophy is the school of Islamic philosophy founded by Mulla Sadra in the 17th century. Mulla Sadra bought "a new philosophical insight in dealing with the nature of reality" and created "a major transition from essentialism to existentialism" in Islamic philosophy, several centuries before this occurred in Western philosophy.

== Contemporary Iranian philosophy ==
Philosophy was and still is a popular subject of study in Iran. Previous to Western-style universities, philosophy was a major field of study in religious seminaries. Comparing the number of philosophy books currently published in Iran with that in other countries, Iran possibly ranks first in this field but it is definitely on top in terms of publishing philosophy books.

=== Main Trends ===
On the diversity and expansion of philosophy in Iran, Khosrow Bagheri has stated "One part of philosophical endeavor in Iran today, and perhaps the main one is concerned with the local philosophy which is dominated by the school of Mulla Sadra. He has provided a philosophy in line with the old metaphysical inclination but in the feature of a combination of mysticism, philosophy, and the Islamic religious views. On the other hand, a relatively strong translation movement has been shaped in which the Iranian readers are provided by some of the important sources of contemporary philosophy in Persian including both the analytic and continental traditions. In the former, Wittgenstein, Searle, and Kripke, and in the latter, Nietzsche, Heidegger, and Foucault can be mentioned. There have also been concentrations on a local polar contrast between Popper and Heidegger, and, due to the religious atmosphere, on the philosophy of religion."

It is also important to note that Sufism has had a great amount of influence on Iranian/Persian philosophy.

=== Impact on World Philosophy ===
There are some instances where the effect of Iranian philosophy is traceable in contemporary world philosophers.

Henry Corbin is one such instance whose major work on Central Asian and Iranian Sufism appears in The Man of Light in Iranian Sufism. His magnum opus is the four volume En Islam Iranien: Aspects spirituels et philosophiques. It has been translated into Persian twice from French.

Slavoj Žižek is another example who has expressed the significance of Iranian and Islamic philosophy in the case of subjectivity and how Iranian philosophers had already beaten the path which was later completed by modern philosophy. In this regard he has emphasized the role of Nadia Maftouni in shedding the light on early views of Islamic philosophers about Imagination:

Now I come with what the work of Nadia Maftouni means to me. Maybe this is a little bit of a wild reading but I will brutally impose my view. In her dealings of imagination, she demonstrates that already ancient Islamic philosophy went this way; namely she goes beyond Aristotle.

Aristotle has a theory of imagination and if we take away some subversive hints it's a pretty traditional theory of imagination. My main point is this one: In the West we usually reduce imagination to something subjective as opposed to objective reality. Things are out there, they are what they are in their identity, maybe this identity is not fully known to us but it exists out there. And then imagination is subjective. We project something on the objects, we fill in the gaps in our knowledge and so on.

But I think what we learn from the tradition which is close to me from German idealism, Hegel and others in the 20th century, up to—if I may engage in this wild speculation—up to philosophical implications of quantum physics, is that objectively also things are not simply what they are. What a thing is imminently implies the space of some kind of ontological imagination—imagination in the thing itself—what this thing might have been but didn't become; what is a secret potential in the thing. So, to understand a thing means not only forget about your mind, focus just on what that thing really is. To understand a thing means to include into its identity, all its potentialities. Maftouni demonstrates that already ancient Islamic philosophy went this way.

=== Philosophical Journals ===
Among journals being published in Iran on philosophy, there are FALSAFEH-The Iranian Journal of Philosophy published by the department of philosophy of the University of Tehran since 1972. and Hikmat va Falsafeh published by Allamah Tabataba'i University in Tehran.

Ma'rifat-e Falsafeh published by the Imam Khomeini Education and Research Institute in Qom, and many others. Also worthy of mention is the journal, Naqd o Nazar published by Daftar Tablighat in Qom, which often includes articles on philosophical topics and other issues of interest to religious thinkers and intellectuals.

== List of schools and philosophers ==
=== Ancient Iranian philosophy ===
- Zoroastrianism
  - Zarathustra (Zoroaster)
  - Hystaspes
  - Jamasp, Old Iranian nobleman, regarded as one of the first Iranian philosophers, see also Middle Persian book Jamasp Namag.
  - Ostanes
  - Astrampsychus
  - Gobryas
  - Patizeithes
  - Tansar, influential Persian high priest (mobad) considered one of the pivotal figures in the development of the political philosophy of the Sassanian state based on the concept of vohu kshathra or huxwadāīh ("Good Sovereignty")
  - Mardan-Farrux Ohrmazddadan
  - Adurfarnbag Farroxzadan
  - Adurbad Emedan
  - Faranbagh Dadagi or Farbag-i Dadweh
  - Azar Kayvan
  - Avesta
  - Gathas
- Anacharsis, a Scythian philosopher
- Persian Sibyl
- Mazdakism, Iranian proto-socialism in the Sassanid Empire
  - Mazdak
  - Mazdak the Elder
- Manichaeism
  - Mani
- Zurvanism
- University of Gundishapur
  - Borzouye, Persian philosopher, physician and Chancellor (vizier) of the Persian court, inventor of Backgammon. Borzouye wrote several books such as the translation of Panchatantra into Middle Persian and Burzoe's quotes. His philosophical ideas were described by Ibn al-Muqaffa.
  - Bakhtshooa Gondishapuri
- Emperor Khosrau's philosophical discourses
  - Paul the Persian
- Pahlavi literature

=== Islamic period ===
- Al-Farabi
- Muhammad ibn Zakariya al-Razi
- Miskawayh
- Avicenna
- Muhammad ibn Musa Al-Khwarizmi
- Imam Mohammad Ghazali Tusi
- Abd al-Qahir al-Jurjani
- Iranshahri
- Zakaria Razi
- Qutb-al-din Razi
- Afdal al-Din Kashani Persian genius Philosopher in 12th century.
- Fakhr al-Din Razi known as Imam Fakhr Razi
- Nasir al-Din Tusi
- Zakariya Qazwini
- Farid al-Din Attar (Attar Nishapuri)
- Umar Suhrawardi
- Umar Khayyam
- Ashraf Jahangir Semnani
- Ali Hamedani
- Mowlana Jalal ad-Din Balkhi (Rumi)
- Mahmoud Shabestari
- Shams al-Din Lahiji
- Nematollah Vali Kermani
- Abdol-Rahman Jami
- Shahab al-Din Suhrawardi and Illumination School
- Sadr al-Din Dashtaki Shiraz School
- Mir Damad and Isfahan School
- Mulla Sadra and Transcendent Philosophy
- Rajab Ali Tabrizi
- Qazi Sa’id Qumi
- Mulla Hadi Sabzevari and Neyshabor School
- Reza Davari Ardakani
- Hossein Elahi Ghomshei
- Mahmoud Khatami
- Nadia Maftouni
- Abdolkarim Soroush
- Ahmad Fardid
- Gholamhossein Ebrahimi Dinani

In history of Islamic philosophy, there were a few Persian philosophers who had their own schools of philosophy: Avicenna, al-Farabi, Shahab al-Din Suhrawardi and Mulla Sadra. Some philosophers did not offer a new philosophy, rather they had some innovations: Mirdamad, Khajeh Nasir and Qutb al-Din Shirazi belong to this group.

=== Iranian Baháʼí philosophy ===
`Abdu'l-Bahá, son and successor of the founder of the Baháʼí Faith, has explained the Baháʼí philosophy in the work Some Answered Questions. This text has been analyzed by Baháʼí scholars Ian Kluge and Ali Murad Davudi.

== See also ==
- Intellectual movements in modern Iran
- Eastern philosophy
- Ancient philosophy
- Religious intellectualism in Iran
- International rankings of Iran
