= James Winston Morris =

American Islamic theologian (born 1949)

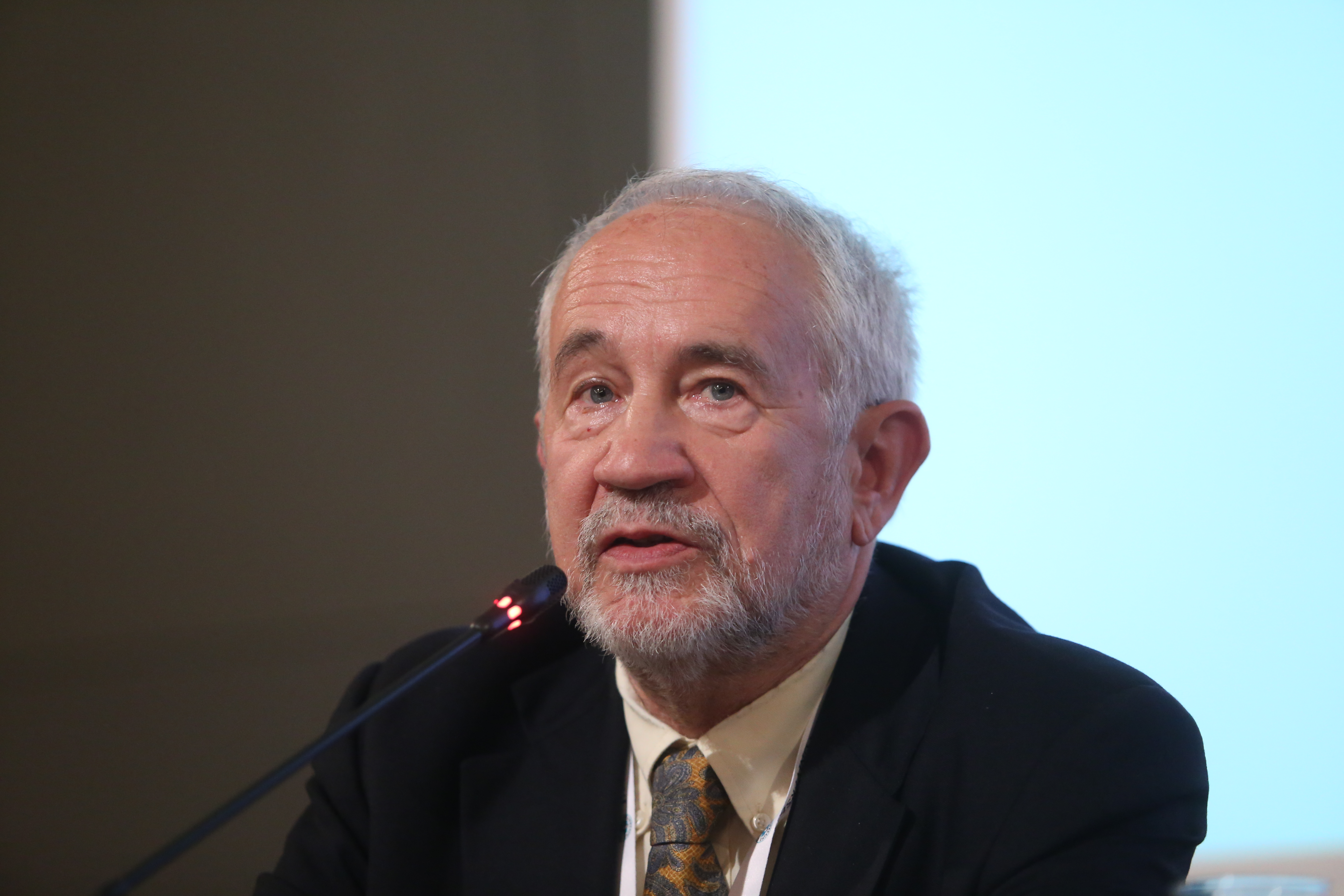
- Born: James Winston Morris; 1949 (age 76–77)

Academic background
- Education: University of Chicago, Harvard University
- Influences: Seyyed Hossein Nasr

Academic work
- Institutions: Boston College, University of Exeter
- Notable works: The Wisdom of the Throne: An Introduction to the Philosophy of Mulla Sadra

James Winston Morris (born 1949) is an American Islamic theologian, currently a professor in the Department of Theology at Boston College. Before teaching at Boston College, he held the Sharjah Chair of Islamic Studies at the University of Exeter.

== Biography and Academic background ==
He received a BA in Civilizational Studies from the University of Chicago in 1971, and a Ph.D. in Near Eastern Languages and Civilizations from Harvard University in 1980, for a thesis "Ibn Masarra: A Reconsideration of the Primary Sources". He also studied at the University of Strasbourg, the American University in Cairo, the Iranian Academy of Philosophy, and the Center for the Study of Civilizations, Tehran. He taught at the Princeton University, Oberlin College, Temple University, and the Institute of Ismaili Studies in Paris and London. He has been a visiting professor at the Ecole Pratique des Hautes Etudes (Paris), University of Malaya, and University of Sarajevo. He specialized in medieval Islamic philosophy, especially in the philosophy of Ibn 'Arabī.

== Publications ==
=== Books ===
- Ostad Elahi on Spirituality in Everyday Life. Kuala Lumpur: Centre for Civilizational Dialogue, University of Malaya, 2009.
- From Ethics and Devotion to Spiritual Realization: Ibn 'Arabī on 'What Is Indispensable For the Spiritual Seeker', Monograph, pp. viii + 37. Kuala Lumpur: University of Malaysia, Centre for Cilisational Dialogue, 2007.
- Knowing the Spirit, by Nûr Alî-Shâh Elâhi, translated by James Morris ( [S.l.]: State university of New York press, 2007.
- The Reflective Heart: Discovering Spiritual Intelligence in Ibn Arabi's 'Meccan Illuminations'. Louisville, KY: Fons Vitae of Kentucky, Inc, 2005. OCLC 535507748
- Orientations: Islamic Thought in a World Civilization. Sarajevo: El-Kalem, 2001 and Cambridge : Archetype, 2004.
- The Wisdom of the Throne: An Introduction to the Philosophy of Mulla Sadra. Princeton, Princeton University Press, 1981.
  - Review, Journal of the American Oriental Society Oct. - Dec. 1983, vol. 103, no. 4, p. 767-768
  - Review, Bulletin of the School of Oriental and African Studies, University of London, 1983, vol. 46, no. 1, p. 149-

=== Articles ===
- "The Spiritual Ascension: Ibn ʿArabī and the Miʿrāj Part I" Journal of the American Oriental Society, Oct. - Dec. 1987, vol. 107, no. 4, p. 629-652
- "The Spiritual Ascension: Ibn ʿArabī and the Miʿrāj Part II" Journal of the American Oriental Society, Jan. - Mar. 1988, vol. 108, no. 1, p. 63-77
- "Ibn ʿArabi and His Interpreters Part II: Influences and Interpretations" Journal of the American Oriental Society, Oct. - Dec. 1986, vol. 106, no. 4, p. 733-756
- Mulla Sadrā's Conception of the Barzakh and the Emerging Science of Spirituality: The Process of Realization (tahqīq). In Islam-West Philosophical Dialogue (Papers Presented at the First World Congress on Mulla Sadra), Tehran, SIPRI Institute, 2005, vol. X, pp. 93–103.
