= ASFAR =

ASFAR may refer to:

- AS FAR (football club) (Association Sportive des Forces Armées Royales), a Moroccan sports club
- AS FAR (women) a Moroccan professional women's football club

== See also ==
- Asfar or Metzad, an Israeli settlement in the West Bank
- Asfar (disambiguation)
