= Mulla Sadra =

17th-century Iranian Shia philosopher and theologian

Ṣadr ad-Dīn Muḥammad Shīrāzī (Mullā Ṣadrā)
- صدرالدین محمد شیرازی
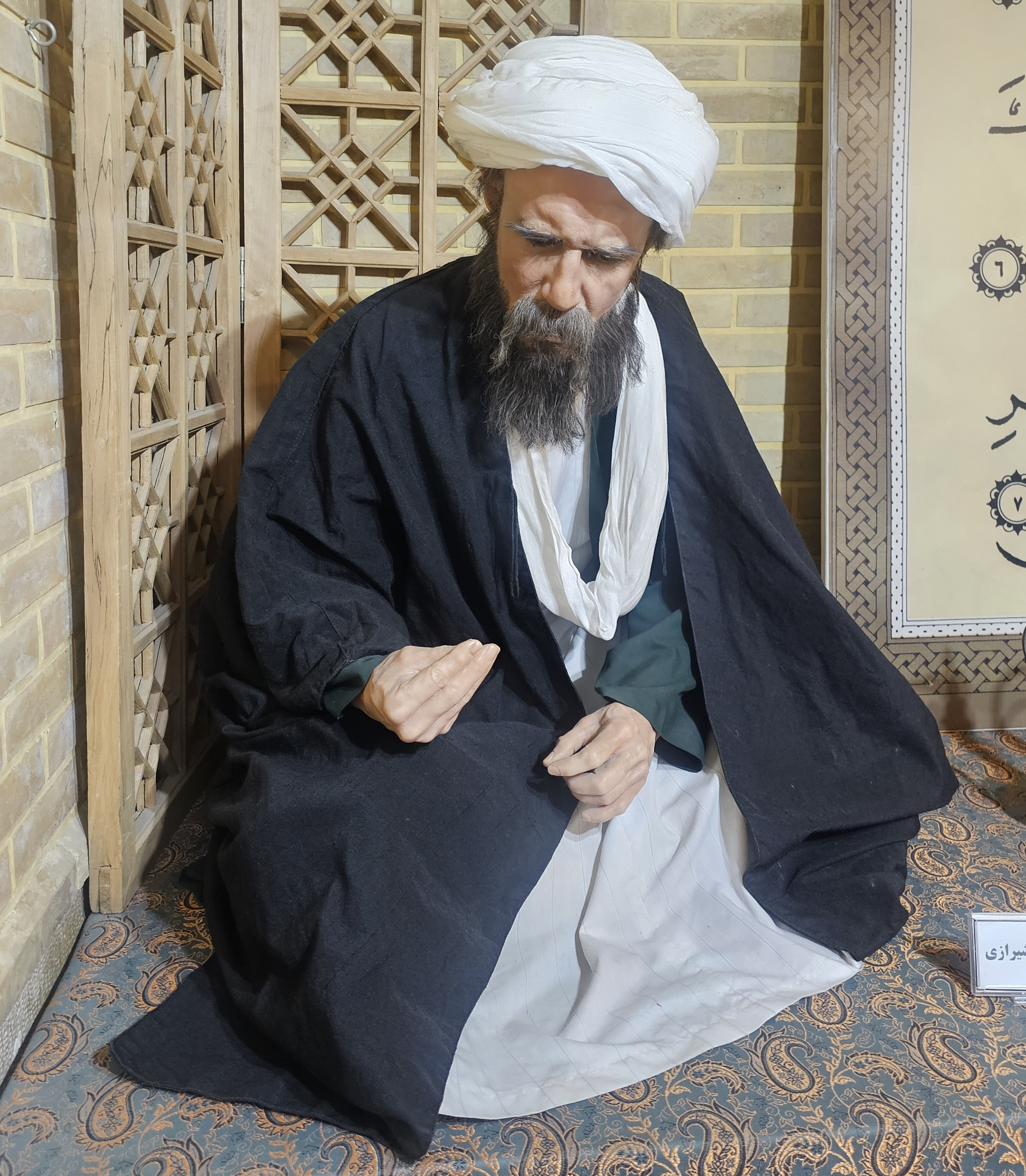
- Sculpture of Mulla Sadra

Personal life
- Born: c. 1571/2 Shiraz
- Died: c. 1635/40 Basra
- Buried: Imam Ali Shrine
- Era: Post-Classical Islamic philosophy
- Region: Safavid Persia
- Main interest(s): Islamic Philosophy, Illuminationism, Transcendent theosophy, Irfan, Tafsir

Religious life
- Religion: Islam
- Denomination: Shia
- Sect: Twelver
- Jurisprudence: Ja'fari

Muslim leader
- Influenced by: Imam Ali, Shahab al-Din Suhrawardi, Mir Damad, Avicenna, Baha al-Din al-Amili, Ibn Arabi
- Influenced: Mohsen Fayz Kashani, Hadi Sabzavari, Abul A'la Maududi, Gholamhossein Ebrahimi Dinani, Seyyed Hossein Nasr

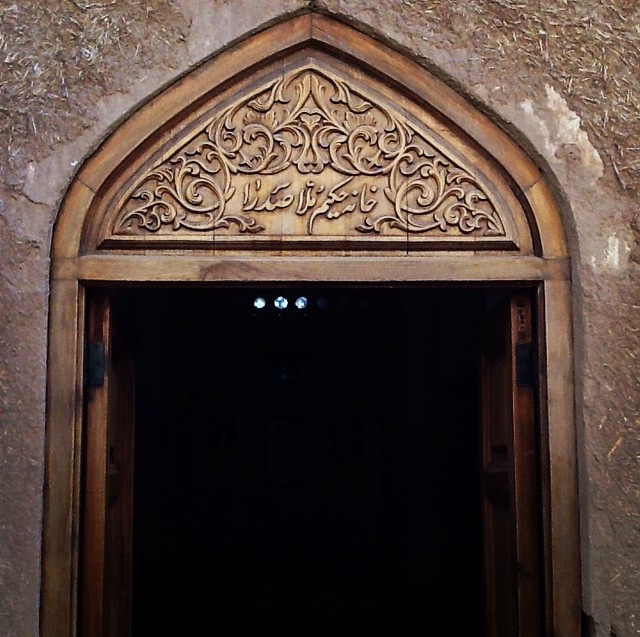
Entrance to Mulla Sadra's House in Kahak, Qom

Ṣadr ad-Dīn Muḥammad Shīrāzī, more commonly known as Mullā Ṣadrā (Persian: ملا صدرا; Arabic: صدر المتألهین; c. 1571/2 – c. 1635/40), was an Iranian Twelver Shi'i Islamic mystic, philosopher, theologian, and ‘Ālim who led the cultural renaissance in the country during the 17th century. According to Oliver Leaman, Mulla Sadra is arguably the single most important and influential philosopher in the Muslim world in the last four hundred years. Though not its founder, he is considered the master of the Illuminationist (or, Ishraghi or Ishraqi) school of Philosophy, a seminal figure who synthesized the many tracts of the Islamic Golden Age philosophies into what he called the Transcendent Theosophy or al-hikmah al-muta’āliyah.

Mulla Sadra brought "a new philosophical insight in dealing with the nature of reality" and created "a major transition from essentialism to existentialism" in Islamic philosophy, although his existentialism should not be too readily compared to Western existentialism. His was a question of existentialist cosmology as it pertained to God, and thus differs considerably from the individual, moral, and/or social, questions at the heart of Russian, French, German, or American Existentialism.

Mulla Sadra's philosophy ambitiously synthesized Avicennism, Shahab al-Din Suhrawardi's Illuminationist philosophy, Ibn Arabi's Sufi metaphysics, and the theology of the Sunni Ash'ari school of Kalam into the framework of Twelver Shi'ism. His main work is The Transcendent Philosophy of the Four Journeys of the Intellect, or simply Four Journeys, In which he attempted to reach Sufism and prove the idea of Unity of Existence by offering a new intake and perspective on Peripatetic philosophy that was offered by al-Farabi and Avicenna in the Islamic world.

== Biography ==
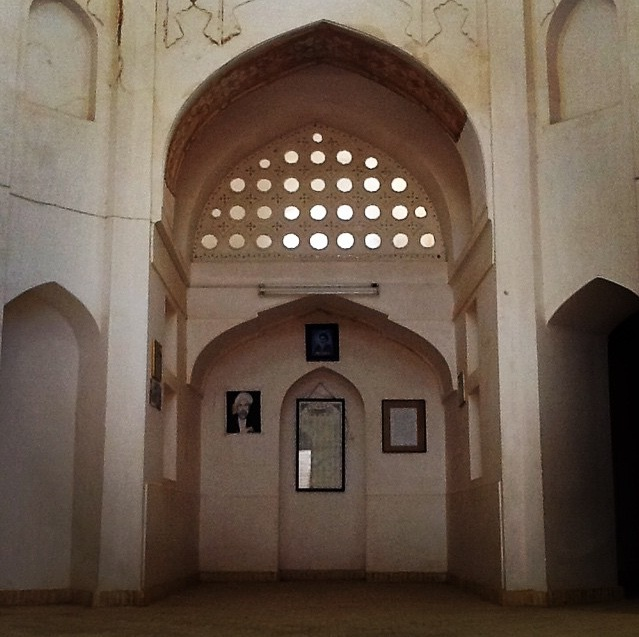
This is a view of the inside of the house of Mulla Sadra in Kahak. A copy of a painted portrait of him is hanged on the wall.

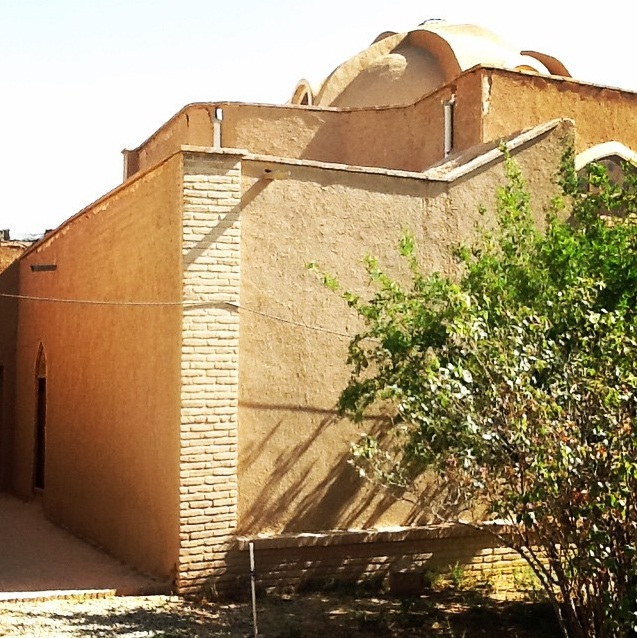
The house of Mulla Sadra in Kahak (a small village near the city of Qom, in Iran) where Mulla Sadra used to live in when he was exiled due to some of his ideas.

=== Early life ===
Mulla Sadra was born in Shiraz, Iran, to a notable Persian family of court officials in 1571 or 1572, In Mulla Sadra's time, the Safavid dynasty governed over Iran. Safavid kings granted independence to Fars province, which was ruled by Mulla Sadra's father, Khwajah Ibrahim Qavami, who was a knowledgeable and extremely faithful politician. As the ruler of the vast region of Fars province, Khwajah was rich and held a high position. When Mulla Sadra was born, the family named him Muhammad but called him Sadra. Years later, Sadra was nicknamed "Mulla", that is, "great scientist". Sadra was Khwajah's only child. In that time it was customary that the children of aristocrats were educated by private teachers in their own palace. Sadra was a very intelligent, strict, energetic, studious, and curious boy and mastered all the lessons related to Persian and Arabic literature, as well as the art of calligraphy, during a very short time. Following old traditions of his time, and before the age of puberty, he also learned horse riding, hunting and fighting techniques, mathematics, astronomy, some medicine, jurisprudence, and Islamic law. However, he was mainly attracted to philosophy and particularly to mystical philosophy and gnosis.

In 1591, Mulla Sadra moved to Qazvin and then, in 1597, to Isfahan to pursue a traditional and institutional education in philosophy, theology, Hadith, and hermeneutics. At that time, each city was a successive capital of the Safavid dynasty and the center of Twelver Shi'ite seminaries. Sadra's teachers included Mir Damad and Baha' ad-Din al-'Amili.

=== Teachers ===
Mulla Sadra became a master of the science of his time. In his own view, the most important of these was philosophy. In Qazvin, Sadra acquired most of his scholarly knowledge from two prominent teachers, namely Baha' ad-Din al-'Amili and Mir Damad, whom he accompanied when the Safavid capital was transferred from Qazvin to Isfahan in 1596. Shaykh Baha'i was an expert in Islamic sciences but also a master of astronomy, theoretical mathematics, engineering, architecture, medicine, and some fields of secret knowledge. Mir Damad also knew the science of his time but limited his domain to jurisprudence, hadith. and mainly philosophy. Mir Damad was a master of both the Peripatetic (Aristotelian) and Illuminationist schools of Islamic philosophy. Mulla Sadra obtained most of his knowledge of philosophy and gnosis from Damad and always introduced Damad as his true teacher and spiritual guide.

After he had finished his studies, Sadra began to explore unorthodox doctrines and as a result was both condemned and excommunicated by some Shi'i ʿulamāʾ. He then retired for a lengthy period of time to a village named Kahak, near Qom, where he engaged in contemplative exercises. While in Kahak, he wrote a number of minor works, including the Risāla fi 'l-ḥashr and the Risāla fī ḥudūth al-ʿālam .

=== Return to Shiraz ===
In 1612, Ali Quli Khan, son of Allāhwirdī Ḵhān and the powerful governor of Fārs, asked Mulla Sadra to abandon his exile and to come back to Shiraz to teach and run a newly built madrasa (Khan School, Persian: مدرسه خان). Mulla Sadra devoted his rest of life to teach the intellectual sciences, particularly his own teachings Transcendent Theosophy.

During his time in Shīrāz, Ṣadrā began writing treatises that synthesized wide-ranging strands of existing Islamic systems of thought at Khan School. The ideas of his school, which may be seen as a continuation of the School of Iṣfahān of Mīr Dāmād and Shaykh Bahāʾī, were promulgated after Sadrā's death by his pupils, several of whom would become sought-after thinkers in their own right, such as, Mullā Muḥsin Fayḍ Kāshānī (Mulla Sadra's son-in-law), and ʿAbd Razzāḳ Lāhidjī.

Although Ṣadrā's influence remained limited in the generations after his death, it increased markedly during the 19th century, when his ideas helped inspire a renewed Akhbārī tendency within Twelver Shīʿism. In recent times, his works have been studied in Iran, Europe, and America. He died in Basra after the Hajj and was buried in the present-day city of Najaf, Iraq.

== Philosophical ideas ==
=== Existentialism ===
Although Existentialism as defined nowadays is not identical to Mulla Sadra's definition, he was the first to introduce the concept. According to Mulla Sadra, "existence precedes the essence and is thus principal since something has to exist first and then have an essence." It is notable that for Mulla Sadra this was an issue that applied specifically to God and God's position in the universe, especially in the context of reconciling God's position in the Qur'an with the Greek-influenced cosmological philosophies of Islam's Golden Era.

Mulla Sadra's metaphysics gives priority to existence over essence (i.e., quiddity). That is to say, essences are variable and are determined according to existential "intensity" (to use Henry Corbin's definition). Thus, essences are not immutable. The advantage to this schema is that it is acceptable to the fundamental statements of the Qur'an, even as it does not necessarily undermine any previous Islamic philosopher's Aristotelian or Platonic foundations.

Indeed, Mulla Sadra provides immutability only to God, while intrinsically linking essence and existence to each other, and to God's power over existence. In so doing, he provided for God's authority over all things while also solving the problem of God's knowledge of particulars, including those that are evil, without being inherently responsible for them — even as God's authority over the existence of things that provide the framework for evil to exist. This clever solution provides for freedom of will, God's supremacy, the infiniteness of God's knowledge, the existence of evil, and definitions of existence and essence that leave the two inextricably linked insofar as humans are concerned, but fundamentally separate insofar as God is concerned.

Perhaps most importantly, the primacy of existence provides the capacity for God's judgement without God being directly, or indirectly, affected by the evil being judged. God does not need to possess sin to know sin: God is able to judge the intensity of sin as God perceives existence.

One result of Sadra's existentialism is "The unity of the intellect and the intelligible" (Arabic: Ittihad al-Aaqil wa l-Maqul. As Henry Corbin describes:

All the levels of the modes of being and perception are governed by the same law of unity, which at the level of the intelligible world is the unity of intellection, of the intelligizing subject, and of the Form intelligized — the same unity as that of love, lover and beloved. Within this perspective we can perceive what Sadra meant by the unitive union of the human soul, in the supreme awareness of its acts of knowledge, with the active Intelligence which is the Holy Spirit. It is never a question of an arithmetical unity, but of an intelligible unity permitting the reciprocity which allows us to understand that, in the soul which it metamorphoses, the Form—or Idea—intelligized by the active Intelligence is a Form which intelligizes itself, and that as a result the active Intelligence or Holy Spirit intelligizes itself in the soul's act of intellection. Reciprocally, the soul, as a Form intelligizing itself, intelligizes itself as a Form intelligized by the active Intelligence.

=== Substantial motion ===
Another central concept of Mulla Sadra's philosophy is the theory of "substantial motion" (Arabic:al-harakat al-jawhariyyah), which is "based on the premise that everything in the order of nature, including celestial spheres, undergoes substantial change and transformation as a result of the self-flow (sarayan al-wujud) and penetration of being (fayd) which gives every concrete individual entity its share of being. In contrast to Aristotle and Avicenna who had accepted change only in four categories, i.e., quantity (kamm), quality (kayf), position (wad) and place (ayn), Sadra defines change as an all-pervasive reality running through the entire cosmos including the category of substance (jawhar)."

=== Existence as reality ===
Mulla Sadra held the view that Reality is Existence. He believed that an essence was by itself a general notion, and therefore does not, in reality, exist.

To paraphrase Fazlur Rahman on Mulla Sadra's Existential Cosmology: Existence is the one and only reality. Existence and reality are therefore identical. Existence is the all-comprehensive reality and there is nothing outside of it. Essences which are negative require some sort of reality and therefore exist. Existence therefore cannot be denied. Therefore, existence cannot be negated. As Existence cannot be negated, it is self-evident that Existence is God. God should not be searched for in the realm of existence but is the basis of all existence. Reality in Arabic is "Al-Haq", and is stated in the Qur'an as one of the Names of God.

To paraphrase Mulla Sadra's Logical Proof for God:

1. There is a being
2. This being is a perfection beyond all perfection
3. God is Perfect and Perfection in existence
4. Existence is a singular and simple reality
5. That singular reality is graded in intensity in a scale of perfection
6. That scale must have a limit point, a point of greatest intensity and of greatest existence
7. Therefore, God exists

=== Causation ===
Sadra argued that all contingent beings require a cause which puts their balance between existence and non-existence in favor of the former; nothing can come into existence without a cause. Since the world is therefore contingent upon this First Act, not only must God exist, but God must also be responsible for this First Act of creation.

Sadra also believed that a causal regress was impossible because the causal chain could work only in the matter that had a beginning, middle, and end:

1. a pure cause at the beginning
2. a pure effect at the end
3. a nexus of cause and effect

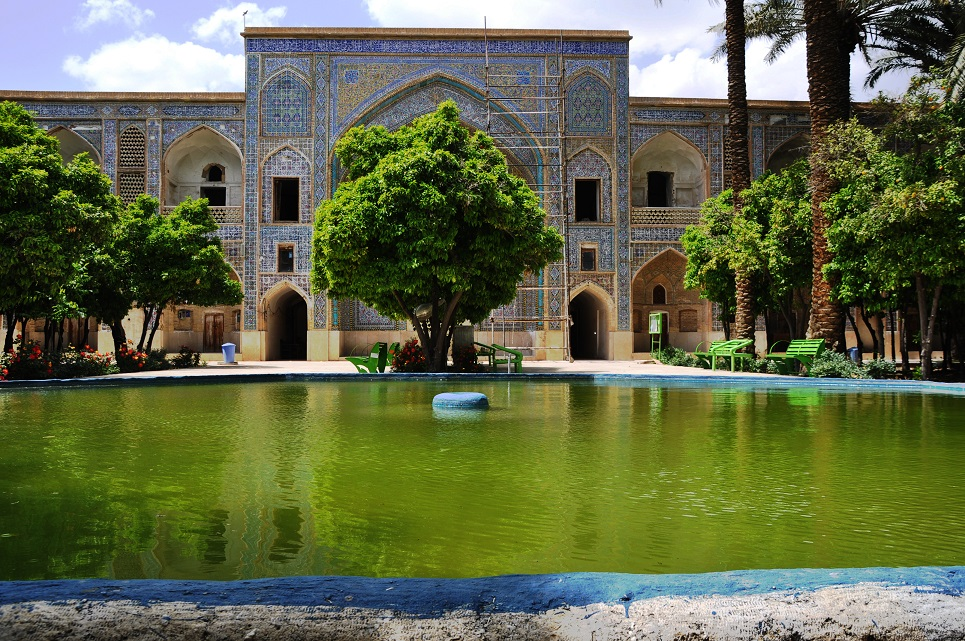
Khan School (est. 1595 AD) was a major madrasa that Mulla Sadra was teaching his philosophy during his residence in Shiraz until he died.

The Causal nexus of Mulla Sadra was a form of existential ontology within a cosmological framework that Islam supported. For Mulla Sadra the causal "End" is as pure as its corresponding "Beginning", which instructively places God at both the beginning and the end of the creative act. God's capacity to measure the intensity of Existential Reality by measuring causal dynamics and their relationship to their origin, as opposed to knowing their effects, provided the Islamically acceptable framework for God's judgement of reality without being tainted by its particulars. This was a solution to a question that had haunted Islamic philosophy for almost one thousand years: How is God able to judge sin without knowing sin?

=== Truth ===
For Mulla Sadra a true statement is a statement that is true to the concrete facts in existence. He held a metaphysical and not a formal idea of truth, claiming that the world consists of mind-independent objects that are always true and truth is not what is rationally acceptable within a certain theory of description. In Mulla Sadra's view one cannot have access to the reality of being: only linguistic analysis is available. This theory of Truth has two levels: the claim that a proposition is true if it corresponds to things in reality; and that a proposition can be true if it conforms with the actual thing itself.

== List of known works ==
- Sharh Usool Al-Kafi شرح اصول الکافي Exegesis of one of the most Important Hadith collection in Shi'a school of thought, Al-Kafi contains narrations from twelve Imams from the family of Muhammad
- Hikmat Al Muta'alyah fi-l-asfar al-'aqliyya al-arba'a [The Transcendent Philosophy of the Four Journeys of the Intellect], a philosophical encyclopedia and a collection of important issues discussed in Islamic philosophy, enriched by the ideas of preceding philosophers, from Pythagoras to those living at the same time with Mulla Sadra, and containing the related responses on the basis of new and strong arguments. In four large volumes; also published several times in nine smaller volumes. He composed this book gradually, starting in about 1015 A.H. (1605 A.D.); its completion took almost 25 years, until some years after 1040 A.H. (1630 A.D.). Book is also translated in Urdu by Indian scholar Abul Ala Maududi by the name of Asfar e Arba.
- al-Tafsir (A commentary upon the Qur'an)
- Diwan Shi’r (Collection of Poems), a number of scholarly and mystic poems in Persian.
- Si Asl, Mulla Sadra's only extant book of philosophy in Persian. Here, by resorting to the main three moral principles, he has dealt with moral and educative subjects related to scientists, and advised his contemporary philosophers.
- Sharh al-hidayah, a commentary on a book called Hidayah, which had been written on the basis of Peripatetic philosophy.
- 'Arshiyyah, also called al-Hikmat al-'arshiyyah, a referential book about Mulla Sadra's philosophy. As in al-Mazahir, he has tried to demonstrate the Beginning and the End concisely but precisely. This book has been translated by Professor James Winston Morris into English with an informative introduction.
- al-Mabda' wa’l-ma‘ad, also called al-Hikmat al-muta‘aliyyah, considered to be a summary of the second half of Asfar. He called this book the Beginning and the End, since he believed at heart that philosophy means the knowledge of the Origin and the Return.
- al-Mazahir This book is similar to al-Mabda' wa’l-ma‘ad, but is shorter than it. It is, in fact, a handbook for familiarizing readers with Mulla Sadra's philosophy.
- Huduth al-'alam, on the issue of the origination of the world, which is a complicated and disputable problem for many philosophers. He proved his solid theory through the theory of the trans-substantial motion.
- Iksir al-'arifin, a gnostic and educative book.
- al-Hashr, a theory of the resurrection of animals and objects in the Hereafter.
- al-Masha‘ir, on existence and its related subjects. Professor Henry Corbin has translated it into French and written an introduction to it. This book has recently been translated into English, too.
- al-waridat al-qalbiyyah, a brief account of important philosophical problems, it seems to be an inventory of the Divine inspirations and illuminations he had received all through his life.
- Iqad al-na‘imin, on theoretical and actual gnosis, and on the science of monotheism. It presents some guidelines and instructional points to wake up the sleeping.
- al-Masa‘il al-qudsiyyah, a booklet deals mainly with issues such as existence in mind and epistemology. Here, Mulla Sadra has combined epistemology and ontology.
- al-Shawahid al-rububiyyah, a philosophical book, written in the Illuminationist style, and represents Mulla Sadra's ideas during the early periods of his philosophical thoughts.
- al-Shawahid al-rububiyyah, a treatise not related to Mulla Sadra's book of the same name (see above). It is an inventory of his particular theories and opinions which he had been able to express in philosophical terms.
- Sharh-i Shafa, a commentary upon some of the issues discussed in the part on theology (Ilahiyyat) in Ibn-Sina's al-Shifa.
- Sharh-i Hikmat al-ishraq, a useful and profound commentary or collection of glosses on Suhrawardi's Hikmat al-ishraq and Qutb al-Din Shirazi's commentary upon it.
- Ittihad al-'aquil wa’l-ma’qul, a monographic treatise on the demonstration of a complicated philosophical theory, the Union of the Intellect and the Intelligible, which no one could prove and rationalize prior to Mulla Sadra.
- Ajwibah al-masa’il, consisting of at least three treatises in which Mulla Sadra responds to the philosophical questions posed by his contemporary philosophers.
- Ittisaf al-mahiyyah bi’l wujud, a monographic treatise dealing with the problem of existence and its relation to quiddities.
- al-Tashakhkhus, explaining the problem of individuation and clarified its relation to existence and its principality, which is one of the most fundamental principles he has propounded.
- Sarayan nur wujud, a treatise dealing with the quality of the descent or diffusion of existence from the True Source to existents (quiddities).
- Limmi’yya ikhtisas al-mintaqah, A treatise on logic, this work focuses on the cause of the specific form of the sphere.
- Khalq al-a’mal, a treatise on man's determinism and free will.
- al-Qada' wa’l-qadar, on the problem of Divine Decree and Destiny.
- Zad al-Musafir, demonstrating resurrection and the Hereafter following a philosophical approach.
- al-Mizaj, a treatise on the reality of man's temperament and its relation to the body and soul.
- Mutashabihat al-Qur'an, a treatise consists of Mulla Sadra's interpretations of those Qura’nic verses which have secret and complicated meanings. It is considered as one of the chapters in [Mafatih al-ghayb].
- Isalat-i Ja’l-i wujud, on existence and its principality as opposed to quiddities.
- al-Hashriyyah, a treatise on resurrection and people's presence in the Hereafter, it deals with man's being rewarded in paradise and punished in hell.
- al-alfazh al-mufradah, an abridged dictionary for interpreting words in the Qur'an.
- Radd-i shubahat-i iblis, explaining Satan's seven paradoxes and providing the related answers.
- Kasr al-asnam al-jahiliyyah (Demolishing the idols of the periods of barbarism and man's ignorance). His intention here is to condemn and disgrace impious sophists.
- al-Tanqih, dealing with formal logic.
- al-Tasawwur wa’l-tasdiq, a treatise dealing with issues of the philosophy of logic and inquiries into concept and judgment.
- Diwan Shi’r (Collection of Poems), a number of scholarly and mystic poems in Persian.
- A Collection of Scientific-Literary Notes, some short notes of his own poetry, the statements of philosophers and gnostics, and scientific issues have been left from his youth, which comprise a precious collection. This book can familiarize the readers with subtleties of Mulla Sadra's nature. These notes were compiled in two different collections, and it is likely that the smaller collection was compiled on one of his journeys.
- Letters: except for a few letters exchanged between Mulla Sadra and his master, Mir Damad, none of his letters has survived. These letters have been presented at the beginning of the 3-volume

== Legacy ==
=== Iran ===
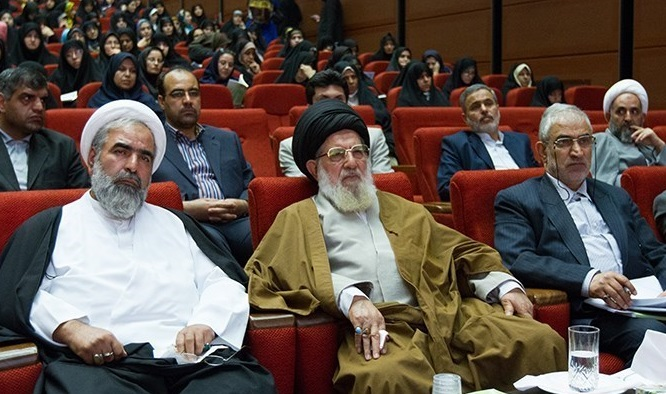
Mulla Sadra Commemoration Conference (Persian: همایش بزرگداشت ملاصدرا)

Mulla Sadra's legacy was preserved into the Qajar period (c. 1785–1925), during which a more receptive intellectual climate contributed to a revival of interest in his works. Scholars associated with the Ṣadrian tradition edited, commented upon, and taught his writings, establishing pedagogical lineages that have continued into the modern period. Among twentieth-century figures associated with this tradition, Muhammad Husayn Tabataba’i (d. 1981) became one of the most widely read interpreters; his philosophical works, drawing on Mulla Sadra's system with certain adaptations, have been used as instructional texts in Iranian philosophy curricula. The study of Mulla Sadra's philosophy expanded further after the 1979 Islamic Revolution, with his works being taught in both religious seminaries and universities. State-supported initiatives also contributed to the institutionalization of Sadrian studies, including the establishment of research centers and the organization of international conferences, such as the Sadra Islamic Philosophy Research Institute in Tehran (founded in 1994) and the World Congress on Mulla Sadra held in 1999.

Mulla Sadra's Commemoration Day (Persian: روز بزرگداشت) is annually held in Iran at the first of Khordad (the third month of the Solar Hijri calendar); on the other hand, this day (1st-Khordad) has been registered among the occasions of Iranian calendars.

=== Iraq ===
In Iraq, Mulla Sadra's works have been taught with relative continuity over the past three centuries, particularly in major Twelver Shiʿi centers of learning such as Najaf. The influence of Ṣadrian philosophy can be observed among a number of twentieth-century Iraqi religious scholars with philosophical training, including Muhammad Baqir al-Sadr, whose writings reflect engagement with elements of his metaphysical framework.

=== South Asia ===
The influence of Mulla Sadra among the Muslims in South Asia has been the subject of increasing scholarly attention, as South Asia was the first region outside Iran in which his influence can be documented. A notable number of expositions and commentaries were produced in India on one of his shorter works, the Commentary on Sharḥ al-Hidaya, which was used as a teaching text in philosophical curricula for several centuries. In later periods, Sadrian philosophy also gained adherents among a number of influential scholars in Pakistan, contributing to the wider circulation of Transcendent Theosophy beyond Iran. In his study Filsuf-i Shirazi dar Hind (“The Philosopher of Shiraz in India”), Akbar Subut compiled references to Mulla Sadra in the writings of approximately 90 scholars associated with the Indian-Islamic scholarly milieu, while Mawdudi, the main figure of Islamic revivalism and Islamism in the region in the last century, had translated thousands of pages from the Asfar in his youth.

== See also ==
- List of Iranian scientists
- Iranian philosophy
- List of Shi'a Muslims
- Al Akbariyya (Sufi school)
- Hossein Nasr
- Advaita Vedanta
- Kalam
- Islamic philosophy
- Irfan
