= Zayn al-Din Omar Savaji =

12th-century Persian philosopher and logician

Zayn al-Din Omar Savaji (Persian: زین الدین عمر ساوجی) was a twelfth century Persian philosopher and logician.

== Life ==
He was born in Saveh (modern Arak province in Iran). He flourished in the early twelfth century. After serving as a judge in Saveh, he went to pursue scholarly interests in Neyshapur. He earned his living by being a copyist of manuscripts of philosophical texts.

== Work and influence ==
Five of his works have been published, three are still in manuscript form and the rest are unknown or possible misattributions. Some of the books he wrote are supposed to have been destroyed when his house burned. His works on logic, in which he made innovative proposals for the use of Persian in place of Arabic terms, were especially influential. He among the few Muslim philosophers who quested the Aristotelian method. He proposed a revisions in the order of the subject matter in Aristotle's Organon. He is cited frequently in the later Iranian philosophical tradition, though he has remained almost unknown to Western historians of philosophy and logic.
