= Dichotomy of soul and spirit in Islamic philosophy =

The distinction between soul (Arabic: نفس, romanized: nafs) and spirit (Arabic: روح, romanized: rūḥ) in the Quran and hadith has rarely been considered by commentators, so that these two words are used interchangeably and synonymously. However, some theologians and scholars of religious scripture insist on the difference between the soul and the spirit and their order of existence. This difference in philosophical discussions is of little concern because of its specific applications, but in Quranic culture the distinction is debatable. There are many reasons that have made this topic less controversial but the most important ones are the lack of scientific evidences, and the dispersion of ideas.

== Man has several spirits ==
The discussions on the epistemology of soul have given rise to many fields of study from ethics, psychology, education, and philosophy to commentary of Qur'anic verses and relevant hadiths among which philosophical speculations have a special place. One critical question or a common subject raised by most philosophers is whether the soul is united or divided. Plato was the first to express an idea about multiplicity of souls arguing that "the reason for internal conflict in individuals is the existence of numerous souls within them."

The majority of Muslim philosophers, including Mulla Sadra (1571–1640), never believed that the soul is divided as it is distinct from the spirit. Sadra's ontological views about the creation of soul were sharply in contrast with the assumptions of Greek philosophers who considered the spirit as a primordial-immaterial and heavenly existent. In Sadraic philosophy the soul is defined bodily in its origination such that it is created along with the creation of the body. Sadra denied the existence of the soul before the body and tried to hold this view in spite of the counter-evidences from the Hadith. he also rejected Plato's theory of numerous souls on the basis that "the soul is the seat of all human faculties though it is simple in composition."

In talking about how the soul reaches a climax of perfection through a staged-process Sadra argues that "when the soul first enters the fetus it is at the developmental stage of a vegetative soul." This vegetative soul next develops into an animal soul and has the potential to further develop into a rational soul and even, in some noble individuals, to the level of a "universal-divine" soul. The latter stage represents the highest level of human perfection; a transcendental stage in which, as concluded by philosophers, "the active intellect is joined" and, as observed by the mystics, "absorption in divine essence occurs."

== The distinctness of the spirit ==
In his more recent studies the psychologist Ahmad Zumurrudian has recognized that there is a distinction between the soul and the spirit, although more philosophical justifications still should be made to support the theory.

Using the soul and the spirit synonymously is seen in almost all Qur'anic commentaries. Also, in commentaries based on the Hadith and tradition, using the two terms interchangeably is very common. In Islamic traditions, a distinction between soul, spirit and body is emphasized by addressing the actions of each part separately. According to a hadith from Imam Sadiq:

God created two connected worlds, the world of upper and lower, then combined the two worlds into the son of Adam...Adam testified that there is no god but God and created him with the soul and body and the spirit. The spirit that does not leave him unless he leaves this world and the soul that he can see dreams and stations by it and body which will be corroded and returns to soil after death.

The view for separation of soul from spirit and body is more strengthened by another hadith narrated by Muhammad Baqir Majlisi from al-Durr al-Manthur on the creation of Adam:

God created Adam as He wills...He created his flesh and blood, his bones, hair, and his body from soil and water; this is the beginning of the creation of Adam. Then He put the soul into his body. Then by the soul man can stand and sit, listen and see, learn and know what animals can know and beware of dangers. Then God put the spirit into the body. By the spirit Adam knows right from wrong and guidance from error and he camouflages and learns and manages all of his affairs.

In Shi'a literature there are also a number of hadiths which exemplify prophets and imams as the most perfect models of creation, purporting that they have five independent spirits to guide them to the straight path. The believers with four spirits are the second in position and disbelievers and animals are last in the chain with three spirits. Two of these spirits are the holy spirit and the spirit of faith. However, the former belongs only to the prophets who used it to judge when they lacked information for normal judgement, while the latter was breathed into all human beings.

== See also ==
- Soul dualism
