= Abu al-Abbas Iranshahri =

9th-century Persian mathematician, astronomer and philosopher

Personal life
- Born: 9th century Nishapur (circa 9th century)
- Died: 9th/10th century
- Main interest(s): Mathematics, astronomy, medicine, science and philosophy
- Notable work(s): Hasti, Ketab-e jalil, Ketab-e athir,

Senior posting
- Influenced: Nasir Khusraw, Biruni, Razi

Abu al-Abbas Iranshahri (Persian: ابوالعباس ایرانشهری) was a 9th-century Persian philosopher, mathematician, natural scientist, historian of religion, astronomer and author. According to traditional sources, he is the first figure in the wider Muslim world to be associated with philosophy after the advent of Islam.

== Life ==
He was born in Nishapur (modern Khorasan in Iran), the city also known as Iranshahr, hence his title Iranshahri. According to Nasir Khusraw, Iranshahri taught Rhazes and Biruni ancient Iranian philosophy.

== Religious Beliefs ==
According to Al-Biruni his rare impartiality was rooted in his lack of dependence on a particular religion. He created a religion and invited others to that.

== Works ==
He authored several books and treatises in Arabic and in Persian. All the books written, some of which are mentioned in passing by Biruni and Nasir Khusraw, have been lost.

He wrote three books; Jalil, Athir, and Masael u'ttabi'a, about philosophy and wisdom. Abulma'ali states that Iranshahri brought a new religion with a Persian book and named his miracle Hasti (existence). According to Biruni, he was knowledgeable about Christianity, Zoroastrianism, Manichaeism, Hinduism, and Shamanism.

== Philosophy ==
According to Abu'l Ma'ali, the author of bayan al-Adyan, Iranshahri considered himself a Prophet and wrote a book in Persian which he claimed have received a divine revelation by the angel called Hasti (Existence). He believed in the unity of all religions and considered existing differences among them the results of special interests (ḡarażμ) of their followers. According to Biruni, Iranshahri had said that God took covenant from light and darkness on the days of Nowruz and Mehragan, which may reflect Zurvanite influence. According to Nasir Khusraw, Iranshahri had expressed philosophical concepts in religious terms in such books as Ketab-e jalil and Ketab-e athir, and had led people to the true religion and the understanding of monotheism.

He maintained that God was always a creator, and there was not a time when he was non-creative (u-rā ṣonʿ nabud) before He turned into being creative. According to him, it is requisite that He always be creator, then it is necessary for that in which His creation appeared to be eternal (qadim). His creation makes its appearance (padid-āyanda ast) in Matter (hayulā), and therefore, Matter, a sign of the apparent power of God, is eternal; and since Matter, which is eternal, requires the existence of Space (makān), it follows that Space should be eternal too. His ideas on time were that time, world, and duration (zamān dahr wa moddat) are names whose meanings are derived from the same essence (jawhar). He also philosophized that Time, a substance in motion and restless (jawhar-e ravanda wa biqarār), is the sign of God's knowledge, in the same way that Space is the sign of His power; motion is the sign of His action, and the being (jesm) is the sign of His ability, and every one of these signs is infinite and eternal.

== See also ==
- Rhazes
- al-Biruni
- Iranian philosophy
- Islamic philosophy
- Natural philosophy
- Nasir Khusraw
- Henry Corbin
