= Qutb al-Din Razi =

Quṭb al-Dīn al-Rāzī al-Taḥtānī
- Born: 1294 or 1295; Persia
- Died: 1364 or 1365 CE (766 AH); Persia

Philosophical work
- Era: philosophy
- Region: Islamic philosophy
- School: Avicennism; Shāfiʿī jurisprudence
- Main interests: Logic; Metaphysics; Islamic jurisprudence
- Notable works: Taḥrīru al-qawāʿid al-manṭiqiyya, Lawāmiʿ al-asrār, al-Muḥākamāt bayna sharḥay al-Ishārāt, Risāla fī taḥqīq al-kulliyāt, Risālat al-maʿmūla fī al-taṣawwur wa-l-taṣdīq
- Notable ideas: Theory of universals (al-kullī al-ṭabīʿī), conception and assent

Quṭb al-Dīn al-Rāzī al-Taḥtānī (d. 766 AH / 1365 CE) was a 14th-century Islamic philosopher, logician, jurist, and commentator in the post-Avicennan philosophical tradition. He played a significant role in refining logical and philosophical discourse, particularly in relation to issues such as universals, and was associated with the Shafi'i legal school.

== Philosophical and logical contribution ==
His philosophical corpus includes major works in logic such as Taḥrīr al-qawāʿid al-manṭiqiyya and Lawāmiʿ al-asrār, as well as philosophical commentaries like al-Muḥākamāt bayna sharḥay al-Ishārāt.

He contributed significantly to the study of universals, particularly through critical engagement with Avicenna’s theory of the natural universal (al-kullī al-ṭabīʿī) the view that universal quiddity exists within particulars as a part of their essence.

His treatises such as Risāla fī taḥqīq al-kulliyāt and Risālat al-maʿmūla fī al-taṣawwur wa-l-taṣdīq shaped later debates in predication, definition, and universal concepts.

== Selected works ==
- Risālat at-taṣauwurāt wa-'t-taṣdīqāt
- Al-Razi, Qutb al-Din (1883). Qutbi.
- Lawāmiʻ al-asrār fī sharḥ Maṭāliʻ al-anwār. 1899.
- تحرير القواعد المنطقية في شرح الرسالة الشمسية للكاتبي. Dar Al Kotob Al Ilmiyah دار الكتب العلمية. January 2014. ISBN 978-2-7451-8471-9.
- Sharḥ al-Maṭāliʻ fī al-manṭiq. 1989.
- Kitāb sharḥ al-maṭāliʻ. 1896.
- Taḥrīr al-qawāʻid al-manṭiqīyah fī sharḥ al-Risālah al-Shamsīyah. 1860.
- Taḥrīr al-qawāʻid al-manṭiqīyah fī sharḥ al-risālah al- shamsīyah. Dār al-Ṭibāʻah Mashhadī Muḥammad Taqī. 1883.
- Hādhā ḥāshiyah min ḥawāshī al-Ishārāt mawsūmah wa-maʻrūfah bi-al-Muḥākamāt: Maʻa ḥāshiyatihā Mīrzā Jān. al-Maṭbaʻah al-ʻĀmirah. 1873.
