= Illuminationism =

Islamic philosophy introduced by Suhrawardi

Illuminationism (Persian حكمت اشراق hekmat-e eshrāq, Arabic: حكمة الإشراق ḥikmat al-ishrāq, both meaning "Wisdom of the Rising Light"), also known as Ishrāqiyyun or simply Ishrāqi (Persian اشراق, Arabic: الإشراق, lit. "Rising", as in "Shining of the Rising Sun") is a philosophical and mystical school of thought introduced by Shahab al-Din Suhrawardi (honorific: Shaikh al-ʿIshraq or Shaikh-i-Ishraq, both meaning "Master of Illumination") in the twelfth century, established with his Kitab Hikmat al-Ishraq (lit: "Book of the Wisdom of Illumination"), a fundamental text finished in 1186. Written with influence from Avicennism, Peripateticism, and Neoplatonism, the philosophy is nevertheless distinct as a novel and holistic addition to the history of Islamic philosophy.

== History ==
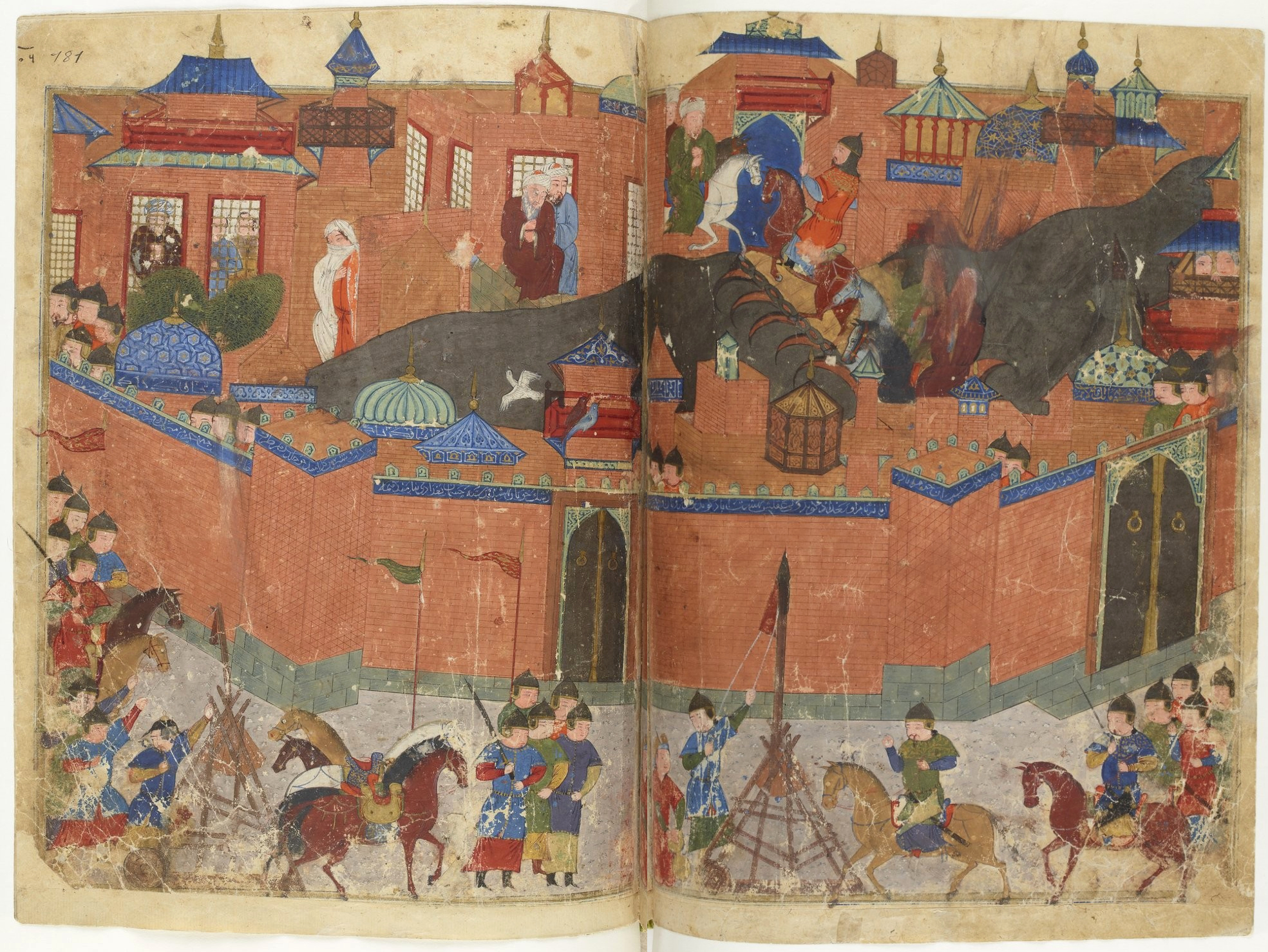
Ilkhanate-Mongols besieging Baghdad under the command of Hulagu Khan, c. 1430.

While the Ilkhanate-Mongol Siege of Baghdad and the destruction of the House of Wisdom (Arabic: بيت الحكمة, romanized: Bayt al-Ḥikmah) effectively ended the Islamic Golden Age in 1258, it also paved the way for novel philosophical invention. Such an example is the work of philosopher Abu'l-Barakāt al-Baghdādī, specifically his Kitāb al-Muʿtabar ("The Book of What Has Been Established by Personal Reflection"); the book's challenges to the Aristotelian norm in Islamic philosophy along with al-Baghdādī's emphasis on "evident self-reflection" and his revival of the Platonic use of light as a metaphor for phenomena like inspiration all influenced the philosophy of Suhrawardi. The philosopher and logician Zayn al-Din Omar Savaji further inspired Suhrawardi with his foundational works on mathematics and his creativity in reconstructing the Organon; Savaji's two-part logic based on "expository propositions" (al-aqwāl al-šāreḥa) and "proof theory" (ḥojaj) served as the precursory model for Suhrawardi's own "Rules of Thought" (al-Żawābeṭ al-fekr). Among the three Islamic philosophers mentioned in Suhrawardi's work, al-Baghdādī and Savaji are two of them.

Upon finishing his Kitab Hikmat al-Ishraq (lit: "Book of the Wisdom of Illumination"), the Persian philosopher Shahab al-Din Suhrawardi founded Illuminationism in 1186. The Persian and Islamic school draws on ancient Iranian philosophical disciplines, Avicennism (Ibn Sina's early Islamic philosophy), Neoplatonic thought (modified by Ibn Sina), and the original ideas of Suhrawardi.

== Key concepts ==
In his Philosophy of Illumination, Suhrawardi argued that light operates at all levels and hierarchies of reality (PI, 97.7–98.11). Light produces immaterial and substantial lights, including immaterial intellects (angels), human and animal souls, and even 'dusky substances', such as bodies.

Suhrawardi's metaphysics is based on two principles. The first is a form of the principle of sufficient reason. The second principle is Aristotle's principle that an actual infinity is impossible.

=== Ishraq ===
The essential meaning of ishrāq (Persian اشراق, Arabic: الإشراق) is "rising", specifically referring to the sunrise, though "illumination" is the more common translation. It has used both Arabic and Persian philosophical texts as means to signify the relation between the "apprehending subject" (al-mawżuʿ al-modrek) and the "apprehensible object" (al-modrak); beyond philosophical discourse, it is a term used in common discussion. Suhrawardi utilized the ordinariness of the word in order to encompass the all that is mystical along with an array of different kinds of knowledge, including elhām, meaning personal inspiration.

== Legacy ==
Suhrawardi tried to present a new perspective on questions like those of existence. He not only caused peripatetic philosophers to confront such new questions, but also gave new life to the body of philosophy after Avicenna. According to John Walbridge, Suhrawardi's critiques of Peripatetic philosophy could be counted as an important turning point for his successors. Although Suhravardi was first a pioneer of Peripatetic philosophy, he later became a Platonist following a mystical experience. He is also counted as one who revived the ancient wisdom in Persia by his philosophy of illumination. His followers, such as Shahrzouri and Qutb al-Din al-Shirazi tried to continue the way of their teacher. Suhrewardi makes a distinction between two approaches in the philosophy of illumination: one approach is discursive and another is intuitive.

=== Safavid Iran ===
Illuminationist thinkers in the School of Isfahan played a significant role in revitalizing academic life in the Safavid Empire under Shah Abbas I (1588–1629). Avicennan thought continued to inform philosophy during the reign of the Safavid Empire. Illuminationism was taught in Safavid Madrasas (places of study) established by pious shahs.

==== Mulla Sadra ====
Mulla Sadra (Ṣadr ad-Dīn Muḥammad Shīrāzī) was a 17th-century Iranian philosopher who was considered a master of illuminationism. He wrote a book titled al-Asfār al-Arbaʻah meaning 'the four journeys', referring to the soul's journey back to Allah. He developed his book into an entire school of thought; he did not refer to al-Asfār as a philosophy but as "wisdom." Sadra taught how one could be illuminated or given wisdom until becoming a sage. Al-Asfar was one piece of illuminationism which is still an active part of Islamic philosophy today. It was representative of Mulla Sadra's entire philosophical worldview. Like many important Arabic works it is difficult for the western world to understand because it has not been translated into English. Mulla Sadra eventually became the most significant teacher at the religious school known as Madrasa-yi Khan. His philosophies are still taught throughout the Islamic East and South Asia.

Al-Asfar is Mulla Sadra's book explaining his view of illuminationism. He views problems starting with a Peripatetic sketch. This Aristotelian style of teaching is reminiscent of Islamic Golden Age Philosopher Avicenna. Mulla Sadra often refers to the Qur'an when dealing with philosophical problems. He quotes Qur'anic verses while explaining philosophy. He wrote exegeses of the Qur'an such as his explanation of Āyat al-Kursī.

Asfār means journeys. In al-Asfar is a journey to gain wisdom. Mulla Sadra used philosophy as a set of spiritual exercises to become more wise.

In Mulla Sadra's book The Transcendent Philosophy of the Four Journeys of the Intellect he describes the four journeys of

1. A journey from creation to the Truth or Creator
2. A journey from the Truth to the Truth
3. A journey that stands in relation to the first journey because it is from the Truth to creation with the Truth
4. A journey that stands in relation to the second journey because it is from the Truth to the creation.

=== Mughal India ===
Recent scholarship has examined the reception of Suhrawardī's Illuminationist philosophy in the Mughal intellectual milieu through analyses of later commentarial traditions. Suheyl Umar, a former director of the Iqbal Academy Pakistan, has argued that the Illuminationist (Ishrāqī) philosophy achieved a broad and diffuse presence within the intellectual culture of Mughal India, with the Ishrāqī thought coming to function as a widely shared philosophical framework across segments of the learned milieu. One study focuses on debates over human voluntary action in the super-commentary of Mīr Zāhid (d. 1689) on Suhrawardī's Hayākil al-nūr, highlighting differing conceptions of the relationship between cognition, desire, and volition. Whereas Suhrawardī and later commentators such as Jalāl al-Dīn Dawānī (d. 1502) tended to interpret volition as an intensified form of desire dominating the soul, Mīr Zāhid distinguished between desire, understood as oriented toward the goal of an action, and volition, understood as directed toward the performance of the action itself. This line of interpretation situates Mughal engagements with Illuminationist thought within a broader pattern of critical appropriation rather than simple adherence to Suhrawardī's philosophical system.

=== Western world ===
None of Suhrawardi's works was translated into Latin, so he remained unknown in the Latin West, although his work continued to be studied in the Islamic East. According to Hosein Nasr, Suhrawardi was unknown to the west until he was translated into western languages by contemporary thinkers such as Henry Corbin, and he remains largely unknown even in countries within the Islamic world.

== See also ==
- Body of light
- Divine illumination
- Divine light
- Divine spark
- Inward light
- Luminous mind
- Perennialism
- Knowledge by presence – Theory of knowledge in Islamic philosophy
