= Asfar =

Asfar may refer to

- Al-Asfar Lake, body of water in Saudi Arabia
- Asfar ibn Shiruya (died 931), Iranian military leader
- Jean Asfar (1917–2010), Egyptian fencer
- Metzad, Israeli settlement

== See also ==
- ASFAR (disambiguation)
