= Shihab al-Din Yahya ibn Habash Suhrawardi =

12th-century Persian philosopher and founder of the school of Illuminationism

Shaykh Shihāb al-Dīn Yaḥyā ibn Ḥabash ibn Amīrak al-Suhrawardī
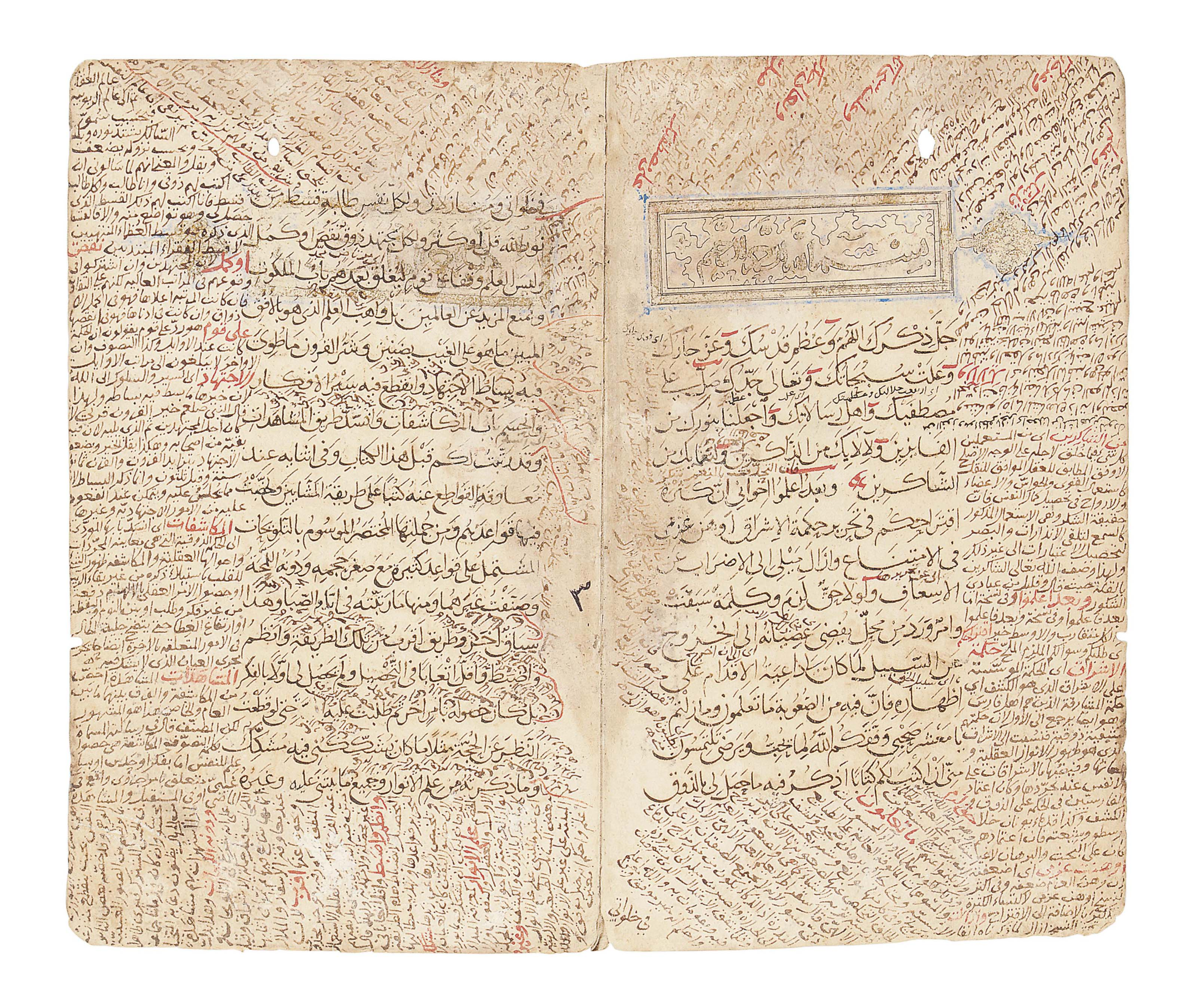
- Manuscript of Ḥikmat al-Ishrāq, copied by Shams ibn Jamal al-Hatani in Iran on 13 October 1220.
- Title: Shaykh al-Ishrāq, al-Maqtūl

Personal life
- Born: 549 AH | 1154 CE Sohrevard, Seljuk Empire
- Died: 587 AH | 1191 CE Aleppo, Ayyubid Sultanate
- Notable works: Ḥikmat al-Ishrāq (The Philosophy of Illumination, 1186); al-Talwīḥāt al-lawḥiyya wa-l-ʿarshiyya (The Intimations); al-Mashāriʿ wa-l-muṭāraḥāt (Paths and Conversations); al-Muqāwamāt (The Oppositions); Hayākil al-Nūr (Temples of Light); al-Alwāḥ al-ʿImādiyya (Tablets to ʿImād); Qiṣṣat al-ghurba al-gharbiyya (The Tale of the Occidental Exile)
- Education: Maragheh, Isfahan
- Known for: Founding Illuminationist philosophy, the metaphysics of light, the theory of presential knowledge, and the imaginal world
- Other names: Sohrevardi, Shihab al-Din, Shaykh al-Ishrāq, Shaykh al-Maqtūl
- Occupation: Philosopher, mystic, writer

Religious life
- Religion: Islam
- Denomination: Sunni
- School: Illuminationism also known as Ishrāq philosophy, Perennial philosophy
- Jurisprudence: Shafi'i
- Creed: Ash'ari (possibly)

Senior posting
- Teacher: Majd al-Din al-Jili, Zahir al-Din al-Farisi

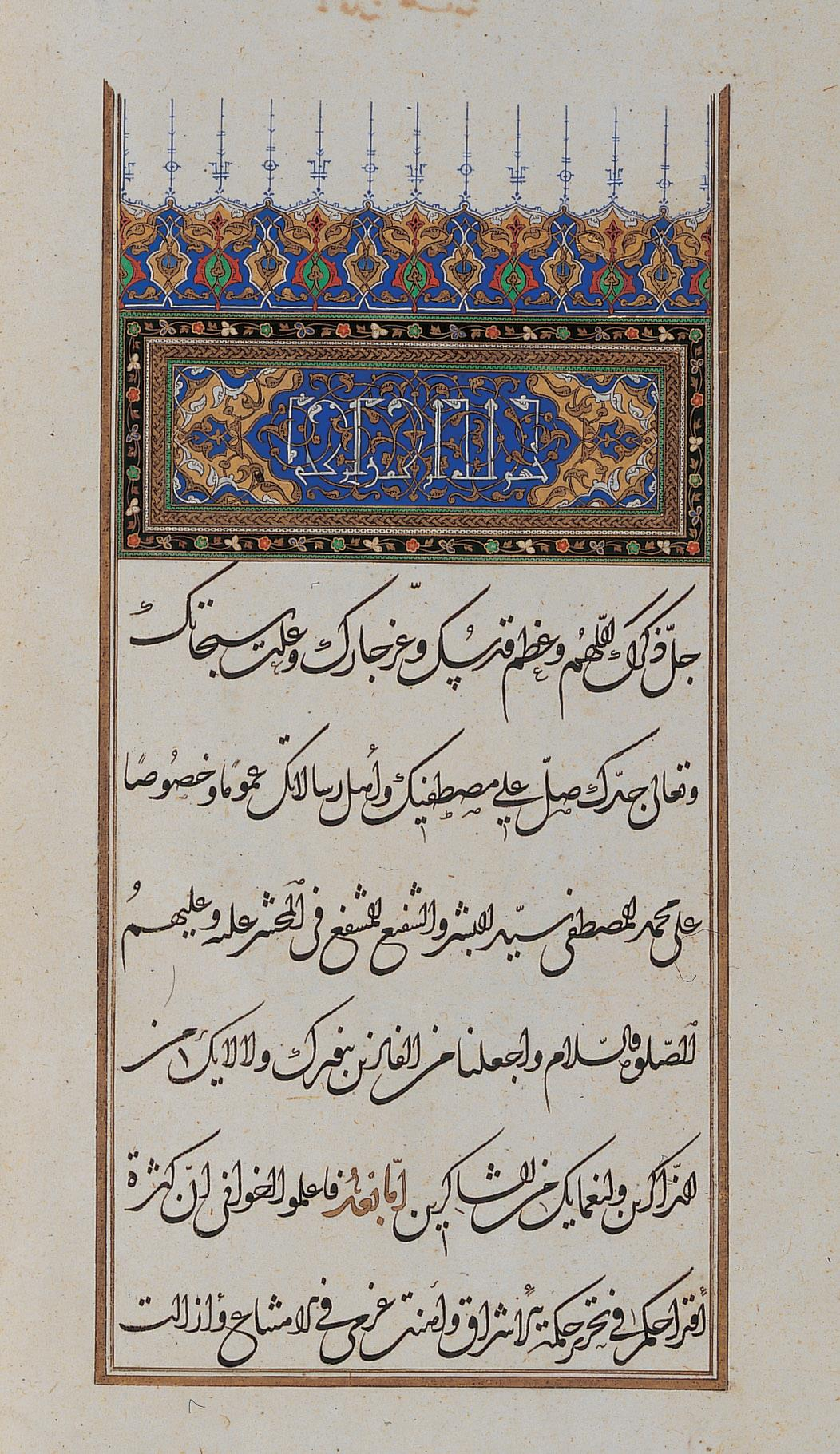
Opening page from the manuscript of Hikmat al-ʿIshraq transcribed by Sayyid Muhammad Munshi for the library of sultan Mehmed II. Istanbul, dated 1477-8 (882 AH). Topkapı Palace Museum

Shihāb al-Dīn Abū al-Futūḥ Yaḥyā ibn Ḥabash ibn Amīrak al-Suhrawardī (Persian: شهاب‌الدین سهروردی, also known as Sohrevardi; 1154–1191) was a Persian philosopher and founder of the Iranian school of Illuminationism, an important school in Iranian and Islamic philosophy.

He is referred to by the honorific title Shaikh al-ʿIshraq "Master of Illumination" and Shaikh al-Maqtul "the Murdered Master", in reference to his execution for heresy. Mulla Sadra, the Persian sage of the Safavid era described Suhrawardi as the "Reviver of the Traces of the Pahlavi (Iranian) Sages", and Suhrawardi, in his magnum opus "The Philosophy of Illumination", thought of himself as a reviver or resuscitator of the ancient tradition of Persian wisdom. Suhrawardi provided a new Platonistic critique of the peripatetic school of Avicenna that was dominant in his time, writing on logic, physics, epistemology, psychology, and metaphysics.

== Life ==
Of Persian stock, Suhrawardi was born in 1154 in Suhraward, a village located between the towns of Zanjan and Bijar Garrus in Iran. He learned wisdom and jurisprudence in the city of Maragheh. His teacher was Majd al-Dīn Jīlī who was also Fakhr al-Din al-Razi’s teacher. He then went to Iraq and Syria for several years and developed his knowledge while he was there.

His life spanned a period of less than forty years during which he produced a series of works that established him as the founder of a new school of philosophy, called "Illuminationism" (hikmat al-Ishraq). According to Henry Corbin, Suhrawardi "came later to be called the Master of Illumination (Shaikh-i-Ishraq) because his great aim was the renaissance of ancient Iranian wisdom". which Corbin specifies in various ways as the "project of reviving the philosophy of ancient Persia".

In 1186, at the age of thirty-two, he completed his magnum opus, The Philosophy of Illumination.

There are several contradictory reports of his death. The most commonly held view is that he was executed sometime between 1191 and 1208 in Aleppo on charges of cultivating Batini teachings and philosophy, by the order of al-Malik al-Zahir, son of Saladin. Other traditions hold that he starved himself to death, others tell that he was suffocated or thrown from the wall of the fortress, then burned by some people.

== Influences on Suhrawardi ==
Suhrawardi was a strong defender of Peripatetic philosophy, until he was influenced by those whom he described as those who "have traveled the path of God", like - as noted by Suhrawardi - Plato from the Greek tradition, Hermes (Thoth) from Egypt, and Pythagoras the Phoenician, and also figures in the Persian tradition. His philosophical project aims to revive the lost hikma of east and west.

It is also apparent that Suhrawardi was strongly influenced by the Sufi tradition, bearing in mind his mystical spiritual journeys that he considered a necessary prerequisite for understanding his Illuminationist philosophy. Zoroastrianism also appears to have influenced Suhrawardi, as its symbols appear in some of his works.

== Teachings ==
Arising out of peripatetic philosophy as developed by Ibn Sina (Avicenna), Suhrawardi's illuminationist philosophy is critical of several of Ibn Sina's positions and radically departs from him in creating a symbolic language (mainly derived from ancient Iranian culture or Farhang-e Khosravani) to give expression to his wisdom (hikma).

Suhrawardi taught a complex and profound emanationist cosmology, in which all creation is a successive outflow from the original Supreme Light of Lights (Nur al-Anwar). The fundamental of his philosophy is pure immaterial light, where nothing is manifest, and which unfolds from the Light of Lights in a descending order of ever-diminishing intensity and, through complex interaction, gives rise to a "horizontal" array of lights, similar in conception to Platonic forms, that governs mundane reality. In other words, the universe and all levels of existence are but varying degrees of Light—light and darkness. In his division of bodies, he categorises objects in terms of their reception or non-reception of light.

Suhrawardi considers a previous existence for every soul in the angelic realm before its descent to the realm of the body. The soul is divided into two parts, one remains in heaven and the other descends into the dungeon of the body. The human soul is always sad because it has been divorced from its other half. Therefore, it aspires to become reunited with it. The soul can only reach felicity again when it is united with its celestial part, which has remained in heaven. He holds that the soul should seek felicity by detaching itself from its tenebrous body and worldly matters and access the world of immaterial lights. The souls of the gnostics and saints, after leaving the body, ascend even above the angelic world to enjoy proximity to the Supreme Light, which is the only absolute Reality.

Suhrawardi elaborated the Neoplatonist idea of an independent intermediary world, the imaginal world (ʿalam-i mithal عالم مثال). His views have exerted a powerful influence down to this day, particularly through Mulla Sadra’s combined peripatetic and illuminationist description of reality.

== Influence ==
Suhrawardi's Illuminationist project was to have far-reaching consequences for Islamic philosophy in Shi'ite Iran. His teachings had a strong influence on subsequent esoteric Iranian thought and the idea of “Decisive Necessity” is believed to be one of the most important innovations in the history of logical philosophical speculation, stressed by the majority of Muslim logicians and philosophers. In the 17th century, it was to initiate an Illuminationist Zoroastrian revival in the figure of the 16th century sage Azar Kayvan.

Many later philosophers were influenced by the Illuminationist philosophy of Suhrawardi including Athir al-Din al-Abhari, Al-Allama al-Hilli, Ibn Abi Jumhur al-Ahsa'i, Jalal al-Din Davani, and also Mulla Sadra.

== Suhrawardi and pre-Islamic Iranian thought ==
Suhrawardi thought of himself as a reviver or resuscitator of the ancient Persian wisdom. He states in Hikmat al-'Ishraq that:

There was among the ancient Persians a community of people guided by God who thus walked the true way, worthy Sage-Philosophers, with no resemblance to the Magi (Dualists). It is their precious philosophy of Light, the same as that to which the mystical experience of Plato and his predecessors bear witness, that we have revived in our book called Illuminationist Philosophy (Hikmat al-'Ishraq), and I have had no precursor in the way of such project.

Suhrawardi uses pre-Islamic Iranian gnosis, synthesising it with Greek and Islamic wisdom. The main influence from pre-Islamic Iranian thought on Suhrawardi is in the realm of angelology and cosmology. He believed that the ancient Persians' wisdom was shared by Greek philosophers such as Plato as well as by the Egyptian Hermes and considered his philosophy of illumination a rediscovery of this ancient wisdom. According to Nasr, Suhrawardi provides an important link between the thought of pre-Islamic and post-Islamic Iran and a harmonious synthesis between the two. And Henry Corbin states: "In northwestern Iran, Sohravardi (d. 1191) carried out the great project of reviving the wisdom or theosophy of ancient pre-Islamic Zoroastrian Iran."

In his work Alwah Imadi, Suhrawardi offers an esoteric interpretation of Ferdowsi's Epic of Kings (Shah Nama) in which figures such as Fereydun, Zahak, Kay Khusraw and Jamshid are seen as manifestations of the divine light. Seyyed Hossein Nasr states: "Alwah 'Imadi is one of the most brilliant works of Suhrawardi in which the tales of ancient Persia and the wisdom of gnosis of antiquity in the context of the esoteric meaning of the Quran have been synthesized".

In this Persian work Partaw Nama and his main Arabic work Hikmat al-Ishraq, Suhrawardi makes extensive use of Zoroastrian symbolism and his elaborate angelology is also based on Zoroastrian models. The supreme light he calls both by its Quranic and Mazdean names, al-nur al-a'zam (the Supreme Light) and Vohuman (Bahman). Suhrawardi refers to the hukamayya-fars (Persian philosophers) as major practitioners of his Ishraqi wisdom and considers Zoroaster, Jamasp, Goshtasp, Kay Khusraw, Frashostar and Bozorgmehr as possessors of this ancient wisdom.

Among pre-Islamic Iranian symbols and concepts used by Suhrawardi are: minu (incorporeal world), giti (corporeal world), Surush (messenger, Gabriel), Farvardin (the lower world), gawhar (pure essence), Bahram, Hurakhsh (the Sun), shahriyar (archetype of species), isfahbad (light in the body), Amordad (Zoroastrian angel), Shahrivar (Zoroastrian angel), and the Kiyani Khvarenah.

With regards to the pre-Islamic Iranian concept of Khvarenah (glory), Suhrawardi mentions:

"Whoever knows philosophy (hikmat) and perseveres in thanking and sanctifying the Light of the Lights, will be endowed with royal glory (kharreh) and with luminous splendor (farreh), and—as we have said elsewhere—divine light will further bestow upon him the cloak of royal power and value. Such a person shall then become the natural ruler of the universe. He shall be given aid from the high heavens, and whatever he commands shall be obeyed; and his dreams and inspirations will reach their uppermost, perfect pinnacle."

و هر که حکمت بداند و بر سپاس و تقدیس نور الانوار مداومت نماید، او را خرّه کیانی بدهند و فرّ نورانی ببخشند، و بارقی الاهی او را کسوت هیبت و بهاء بپوشاند و رئیس طبیعی شود عالم را، و او را از عالم اعلا نصرت رسد و سخن او در عالم علوی مسموع باشد، و خواب و الهام او به کمال رسد.»

== Suhrawardi and Illumination school ==
According to Hossein Nasr since Sheykh Ishraq was not translated into Western languages in the medieval period, Europeans had little knowledge about Suhrawardi and his philosophy. His school is ignored even now by later scholars. Sheykh Ishraq tried to pose a new perspective on questions like the question of Existence. He not only caused peripatetic philosophers to confront new questions but also gave new life to the body of philosophy after Avicenna.

According to John Walbridge, Suhrawardi's critique on peripatetic philosophy can be counted as an important turning point for his successors. Suhrawardi tried to criticize Avicennism in a new approach. Although Suhrawardi first was a pioneer of peripatetic philosophy, he later became a Platonist following a mystical experience. He is also considered as the one who revived the ancient wisdom of Persia by his philosophy of Illumination. His followers include other Kurdish and Persian philosophers such as Shahrazuri and Qutb al-Din al-Shirazi who tried to continue the way of their teacher. Suhrawardi made a distinction between two approaches in his Illuminationism: one approach is discursive and the other is intuitive.

== Scholarly views on Suhrawardi ==
There are different and contradictory views regarding the character of Suhrawardi's school. Some scholars such as Hossein Ziai believe that the most important aspects of his thought are his logic and critique of the peripatetic conception of definitions. On the other hand, scholars like Mehdi Hairi and Sayyid Jalal Addin Ashtiyyani, believe that Suhrawardi remained within the framework of peripatetic and neo-Avicennian philosophy. Mehdi Amin Razavi criticises both these groups for ignoring the mystical dimension of Suhrawardi's writings. In turn, scholars such as Henry Corbin and Hossein Nasr view Suhrawardi as a theosophist and focus on the mystical dimension of his work. Viewing in another way, Nadia Maftouni has analysed Suhrawardi's works to figure out the elements of philosophy as a way of life. As she holds, the priority of practical reason to theoretical reason, the emphasis on intuition, taking philosophy as a practice of attaining optional death, and proposing ways to heal mental diseases may well be considered the main elements of philosophy as a way of life in Suhrawardi's allegorical treatises.

== Writings ==
Suhrawardi left over 50 writings in Persian and Arabic.

=== Persian writings ===
- Partaw Nama ("Treatise on Illumination")
- Hayakal al-Nur al-Suhrawardi [Sohravardi, Shihaboddin Yahya] (1154–91) Hayakil al-nur ("The Temples of Light"), ed. M.A. Abu Rayyan, Cairo: al-Maktaba al-Tijariyyah al-Kubra, 1957. (The Persian version appears in oeuvres vol. III.)
- Alwah-i Imadi ("The tablets dedicated to Imad al-Din")
- Lughat-i Muran ("The language of Termites")
- Risalat al-Tayr ("The Treatise of the Bird")
- Safir-i Simurgh ("The Calling of the Simurgh")
- Ruzi ba Jama'at Sufiyaan ("A Day with the Community of Sufis")
- Fi Halat al-Tufulliyah ("On the State of Childhood")
- Awaz-i Par-i Jebrail ("The Chant of Gabriel's Wing")
- Aql-i Surkh ("The Red Intellect")
- Fi Haqiqat al-'Ishaq ("On the Reality of Love")
- Bustan al-Qolub ("The Garden of Hearts")

=== Arabic writings ===
- Kitab al-talwihat
- Kitab al-moqawamat
- Kitab al-mashari' wa'l-motarahat, Arabic texts edited with introduction in French by H. Corbin, Tehran: Imperial Iranian Academy of Philosophy, and Paris: Adrien Maisonneuve, 1976; vol II: I. Le Livre de la Théosophie oriental
- (Kitab Hikmat al-ishraq) 2. Le Symbole de foi des philosophes. 3. Le Récit de l'Exil occidental, Arabic texts edited with introduction in French by H. Corbin, Tehran: Imperial Iranian Academy of Philosophy, and Paris: Adrien Maisonneuve, 1977; vol III: oeuvres en persan, Persian texts edited with introduction in Persian by S.H. Nasr, introduction in French by H. Corbin, Tehran: Imperial Iranian Academy of Philosophy, and Paris: Adrien Maisonneuve, 1977. (Only the metaphysics of the three texts in Vol. I were published.) Vol. III contains a Persian version of the Hayakil al-nur, ed. and trans. H. Corbin
- L'Archange empourpré: quinze traités et récits mystiques, Paris: Fayard, 1976, contains translations of most of the texts in vol. III of oeuvres philosophiques et mystiques, plus four others. Corbin provides introductions to each treatise, and includes several extracts from commentaries on the texts. W.M. Thackston, Jr, The Mystical and Visionary Treatises of Shihabuddin Yahya Suhrawardi, London: Octagon Press, 1982, provides an English translation of most of the treatises in vol. III of oeuvres philosophiques et mystiques, which eschews all but the most basic annotation; it is therefore less useful than Corbin's translation from a philosophical point of view)
- Mantiq al-talwihat, ed. A.A. Fayyaz, Tehran: Tehran University Press, 1955. The logic of the Kitab al-talwihat (The Intimations)
- Kitab hikmat al-ishraq (The Philosophy of Illumination), trans H. Corbin, ed. and intro. C. Jambet, Le livre de la sagesse orientale: Kitab Hikmat al-Ishraq, Lagrasse: Verdier, 1986. (Corbin's translation of the Prologue and the Second Part (The Divine Lights), together with the introduction of Shams al-Din al-Shahrazuri and liberal extracts from the commentaries of Qutb al-Din al-Shirazi and Mulla Sadra. Published after Corbin's death, this copiously annotated translation gives to the reader without Arabic immediate access to al-Suhrawardi's illuminationist method and language)

=== English translations ===
- The Philosophy of Illumination: A New Critical Edition of the Text of Hikmat Al-Ishraq, edited by John Walbridge and Hossein Ziai, Provo, Brigham Young University Press, 1999.
- The Shape of Light: Hayakal al-Nur, interpreted by Shaykh Tosun Bayrak al-Jerrahi al-Halveti, Fons Vitae, 1998.
- The Mystical & Visionary Treatises of Suhrawardi, Translated by W.M. Thackson, Jr., London, The Octagon Press, 1982.

== See also ==
- Suhrawardiyya

== Sources ==
- Amin Razavi, M. (1997) Suhrawardi and the School of Illumination, Richmond: Curzon. (Clear and intelligent account of the main principles of his thought.)
- Corbin, H. (1971) En Islam iranien: aspects spirituels et philosophiques, vol. II: Sohrawardi et les Platoniciens de Perse, Paris: Gallimard. (Corbin devoted more of his time to the study of al-Suhrawardi than to any other figure, and this volume represents the essence of his research.)
- Jad Hatem Suhrawardî et Gibran, prophètes de la Terre astrale, Beyrouth, Albouraq, 2003
- Ha'iri Yazdi, M. (1992) The Principles of Epistemology in Islamic Philosophy: Knowledge by Presence, Albany, NY: State University of New York Press. (An original work on epistemology by a contemporary Iranian philosopher drawing critical comparisons between certain Islamic and Western philosophers; incorporates the best exposition in a Western language of al-Suhrawardi's theory of knowledge.)
- Nasr, S.H. (1983) Shihab al-Din Suhrawardi Maqtul, in M.M. Sharif (ed.) A History of Muslim Philosophy, vol. I, Wiesbaden: Otto Harrassowitz, 1963; repr. Karachi, no date. (Still one of the best short introductions to al-Suhrawardi, particularly useful on the cosmology.)
- al-Shahrazuri, Shams al-Din (c. 1288) Sharh hikmat al-ishraq (Commentary on the Philosophy of Illumination), ed. H. Ziai, Tehran: Institute for Cultural Studies and Research, 1993. (Critical edition of the 13th-century original; Arabic text only, but a useful short introduction in English.)
- Walbridge, John (1999) The Leaven of the Ancients: Suhrawardi and the Heritage of the Greeks, Albany, New York: State University of New York Press.
- Walbridge, John (2001) The Wisdom of the Mystic East: Suhrawardi and Platonic Orientalism, Albany, New York: State University of New York Press.
- Ziai, H. (1990) Knowledge and Illumination: a Study of Suhrawardi's Hikmat al-ishraq, Atlanta, GA: Scholars Press. (A pioneering study of al-Suhrawardi's logic and epistemology, particularly his criticism of the peripatetic theory of definition; unfortunately this work suffers from sloppy production.)
- Ziai, H. (1996a) Shihab al-Din Suhrawardi: Founder of the Illuminationist School, in S.H. Nasr and O. Leaman (eds) History of Islamic Philosophy, London: Routledge, 434-64. (Biography of al-Suhrawardi.)
- Ziai, H. (1996b) The Illuminationist Tradition, in S.H. Nasr and O. Leaman (eds) History of Islamic Philosophy, London: Routledge, 465-96. (General description of the Illuminationist tradition.)
