= Gharbzadegi (book) =

Non-fiction book by Jalal Al-e Ahmad

- Author: Jalal Al-e-Ahmad
- Original title: غرب‌زدگی
- Language: Persian
- Subject: Islamic history socio-political critique
- Genre: non-fiction
- Published: September or October 1962 (parts of it were published)
- Publication place: Imperial State of Iran

Gharbzadegī (Persian: غرب‌زدگی, romanized: ġarb-zadagī, lit. 'weststruckness', pronounced [ˈɣarb.ˈzadaˈɡiː]) is a Persian non-fiction book by Jalal Al-e-Ahmad, an Iranian intellectual, translator, and fiction writer, the first sections of which were published in 1341 SH (1962). Gharbzadegī conveys Al-e-Ahmad's particular view regarding thought of Weststruckness and the perpetual, millennia-long war of the "evil" West against the "good" non-West. The year after some of its sections were released, Gharbzadegī was placed by SAVAK among the banned books. This book received almost unanimously negative reviews from critics.

== Release and reception ==
The writing of Gharbzadegī was completed in 1340 SH (1961 or 62). (Note: Since the year 1340 SH covers parts of the two years 1961 and 1962 AD, and because no document stated the month or season in which the book was completed in 1340, it was therefore written as "1961 or 62".) Parts of it were published for the first time in the magazines Kitāb-i Māh and Kayhān-i Māh in Mehr 1341 (September or October 1962). Subsequently, both magazines were shut down, and the book's second edition—which was supposed to be published a year later with additions—was banned by SAVAK until the 1979 Revolution. Despite being banned by the government, the book continued to be circulated and distributed clandestinely, effectively remaining available to almost anyone who sought it in the 1960s and 1970s.

=== Critical response ===
Gharbzadegī received overwhelmingly negative critical reception. Abbas Amanat in Iran: A Modern History provides a critical and comprehensive analysis of Jalal Al-e-Ahmad's Gharbzadegī, positioning it as a highly influential but deeply flawed text. Assessing the book's origins, its author's complex biography, its intellectual debts, and its lasting impact, Amanat presents Gharbzadegī as a pivotal yet profoundly problematic work. He views it as a hastily constructed, self-righteous, and conspiratorial pamphlet that, while tapping into genuine anxieties about modernity and identity, offered a simplistic and historically distorted narrative. Amanat believes this narrative has had a pernicious and lasting effect on Iranian political and cultural discourse. He also describes Al-e Ahmad's theory of weststruckness as hurried, Third-Worldist, careless, and nativist. Mohsen Ghane'-Basiri is fundamentally critical of Jalal's book. While acknowledging Al-e-Ahmad's historical significance as an activist, he argues that the book is not a valid or rigorous analysis, but rather a problematic ideological and metaphysical construct born of a specific historical context (tyranny of Pahlavi). Ghane'-Basiri contends that the book's core methodology is fundamentally flawed—treating the West as a monolithic, conspiratorial force rather than a pluralistic phenomenon—which leads to a distorted and counterproductive understanding of the West, modernity, and Iran's own societal challenges. Ghane'-Basiri ultimately positions the work as an obstacle to genuine development and understanding, asserting that its flawed framework has had lasting negative consequences for Iranian intellectualism by preventing self-examination and fostering a dysfunctional relationship with modernity. Mohammad Zakeri of Etemad newspaper maintains a balanced, analytical perspective throughout, neither wholly endorsing nor dismissing Al-e-Ahmad's framework. While acknowledging significant methodological weaknesses and subsequent critiques, the reviewer affirms the importance of Al-e-Ahmad's work as a courageous intervention in its historical context and suggests its core concerns retain relevance for contemporary Iranian society.

Gholam Vatandoust's stance is one of scholarly ambivalence. He—writing for Middle East Studies Association Bulletin—acknowledges the book's undeniable cultural impact and historical significance. However, he maintains critical distance regarding its intellectual rigor and factual accuracy. The review positions Gharbzadegī as a culturally symptomatic document—more valuable for understanding the mindset of a generation than as a work of historical scholarship. For Canadian Journal of Political Science writing, Shiraz Dossa's position is one of sympathetic endorsement. He clearly aligns with the book's critical posture toward Western cultural influence and the complicity of local intellectuals. While maintaining scholarly objectivity by noting the work's factual and rhetorical flaws, he presents these as secondary to its power as a cultural critique. The review positions Gharbzadegī not as a work of dispassionate scholarship but as an important primary document of intellectual and spiritual dissent. Mohammad Rahbar of BBC Persian calls the book a hasty, story-driven work that offers "an angry interpretation" of the disorder and backwardness of the Muslim East. Dariush Ashoori praises Al-e-Ahmad's courage but sees his economic and historical reasoning as misguided, arguing that the author ultimately flees the Western world only to fall into fundamentalism and reactionarism. John Campbell of Foreign Affairs dismisses Al-e-Ahmad's arguments as shrill, and often puerile. Sadegh Zibakalam traces the book's anti-Western sentiment to the ideological traditions of the Tudeh Party.

== See also ==
- Gharbzadegi (Weststruckness)
- Sharqzadegi (Eaststruckness)
- Westernization
- Easternization
