= Gholam-Hossein Sa'edi =

Iranian writer (1936–1985)

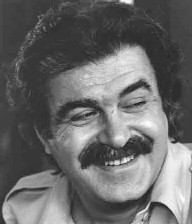
- Born: 15 January 1936; Tabriz, Imperial State of Iran
- Died: 23 November 1985 (aged 49); Paris, France
- Occupation: Writer

Gholām-Hossein Sā'edi MD, also transliterated as Gholamhoseyn Sa'edi and Ghulamhusayn Sa'idi (Persian: غلامحسین ساعدی; 15 January 1936 in Tabriz – 23 November 1985 in Paris), was a prolific Iranian writer.

He published over forty books, representing his talents in the fiction genres of drama (under the pen name Gohar Morad or Gowhar Murad, according to Library of Congress arabicised transliteration), the novel, the screenplay, and the short story in addition to the non-fiction genres of cultural criticism, travel literature and ethnography. Many consider the screenplay for Gav ("The Cow"), Dariush Mehrjui's 1969 film, to be Sa'edi's magnum opus as it ushered in the New Wave Iranian cinema. After the 1979 Iranian Revolution and his subsequent exile, he maintained an important figure in the scene of Persian literature despite the Iranian diaspora of which he unwillingly became a part.

Till his death in Paris, due to depression and related alcoholism, he remained one of the most prominent and prolific of Iranian writers and intellectuals internationally.

== Biography ==
Sa'edi was born in Tabriz, Iran, the cultural and economic center of the northwestern Iranian region of Azerbaijan, to Tayyebe and Ali Asghar Sa'edi. His father, who belonged to the Sa'ed ol-Mamalek clan, worked as a government administrator. The family lived in relative poverty. His older sister died when she was eleven months old, but he grew up with a younger brother and sister. In 1941, after the Soviet Union invaded Tabriz in the Anglo-Soviet invasion of Iran, he and his family fled to a village. There, Sa'edi became fascinated with the culture of rural Iran. As a boy he was an avid reader fascinated particularly by writings of Anton Chekhov. It was in those days, he wrote many years later, that his "eyes suddenly opened."

In 1945, his native province became an autonomous socialist republic. Although the separatist state lasted only a year, it temporarily instated Azerbaijani as the official language in addition to inspiring the young Sa'edi. In 1949, he joined the youth organization of the outlawed separatist party, the Azerbaijani Democratic Party. In addition to instigating villagers against large land owners, he helped edit three magazines: Faryad, So’ud, and Javanan-e Azarbayjan. In 1953, after Operation Ajax, the CIA coup d'état against the democratically elected Prime Minister Mohammad Mosaddeq, he and his younger brother were arrested and imprisoned at Shahrbani Prison in Tabriz. Although he renounced his allegiances to the communist Tudeh Party of Iran, he continued his socio-politically critical literary career.

Although Sa'edi started writing in his boyhood, he started publishing his first short stories in the early 1950s. He published more stories through the course of the decade and his first play, Leylaj'ha, in 1957, albeit under the female pen name, Gohar Morad (also spelled Gowhar Murad). After moving to Tehran in the early 1960s, where he and his brother, Akbar, founded a medical clinic in the impoverished south of the city, he became acquainted with the literary intelligentsia of Iran. In addition to living with Ahmad Shamlou, a renowned lyric poet, he befriended Jalal Al-e Ahmad, author of Gharbzadegi ("Weststruckness"), Simin Daneshvar, Parviz Natel-Khanlari, Jamal Mirsadeghi, Mina Assadi and others. He also traveled to southern Iran, specifically areas of the Persian Gulf coast, and wrote ethnographic travel literature.

In the 1960s, freedom of expression diminished greatly in Iran. Sa'edi and other intellectuals protested the Ministry of Culture and Art policy of 1966 forcing all publishers to seek state permission to print literature. In 1968, after their protests failed, Sa'edi and other writers formed the Kanun-e Nevisandegan-e Iran ("Association of Iran Writers"). Although censorship of some of his works continued, Sa'edi continued to publish. In addition to dramas, stories, novels, and screenplays, Sa'edi participated in the publication of literary magazines, scientific journals and also published fifteen translations of European psychological and medical literature. In 1973, Amir Kabir Publishers made Sa'edi editor of Alefba, a quarterly literary magazine. However, in 1974 the Pahlavi government banned the journal and SAVAK, its secret police, arrested and tortured Sa'edi. Already having a history of suicidal thoughts, Sa'edi's depression loomed after his release from Tehran's infamous Evin Prison nearly a year later.

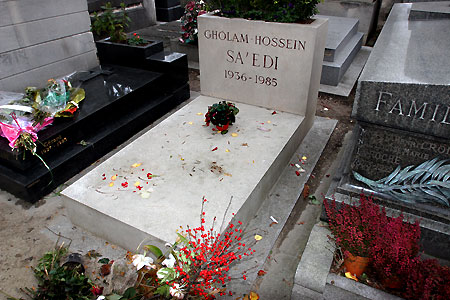
Père Lachaise Cemetery.

The late 1970s and early 1980s saw Sa'edi's last attempts to promote democracy in Iran. In 1977, he partook in the event Dah Shab-e Sher ("Ten Nights of Poetry") in Tehran organized by the Association of Iranian Writers in cooperation with the Goethe-Institut. The International Freedom to Publish Committee of the Association of American Publishers invited Sa'edi to New York City where he spoke and met American playwright Arthur Miller. After the revolution, he joined the National Democratic Front, a liberal leftist party founded (in honor of Mosaddeq) in opposition to the Islamist right wing led by Ayatollah Khomeini.

After the foundation of the theocratic Islamic republic and the execution of his friend, the playwright Saeed Soltanpour, Sa'edi fled to France via Pakistan. In 1982, in Paris, he founded the Association of Iranian Writers in Exile and reestablished the journal Alefba. Additionally, he co-founded the exilic Anjoman-e Te'atr-e Iran ("Iranian Theater Society") and wrote two more plays, in addition to several essays.

Although it did not halt his literary activities, the torment of exile exacerbated Sa'edi's depression and alcoholism. In 1985, after years of heavy drinking, Sa'edi was diagnosed with cirrhosis. He continued to drink until admitted to St. Antoine's hospital in Paris on 2 November 1985. On 23 November, he died with his wife and father by his side. Days later he was buried, with a memorial organized by the Association of Iranian Writers in Exile, at Père Lachaise Cemetery near Sadegh Hedayat's grave.

== Education ==
In 1942, Sa'edi's started attending elementary school at Badr School. He started intermediate school in 1948 at Mansur School but later transferred to Hekmat School. In 1954, he graduated from high school and later that year entered medical school at Tabriz University (today the medical school is the independent Tabriz University of Medical Sciences). After graduating in 1961 with his dissertation titled Alal-e Ejtema'yi-ye Psiku-nuruz'ha dar Azarbayjan ("Societal Causes of Psychoneurosis in Azerbaijan"), he served his mandatory military service as a doctor at the Saltanatabad Garrison in Tehran. In 1962, he enrolled at the University of Tehran (today its medical school is the independent Tehran University of Medical Sciences) to complete his medical specialization in psychiatry, while completing his medical residency at Ruzbeh Hospital.

== Works ==
Drama

- Leylaj'ha (1957)
- Qased'ha (1957)
- Shaban Faribak (1957)
- Karbafak'ha dar Sangar (1960)
- Bamha va Zir-e Bamha (1961)
- Kalat-e Gol (1961)
- Arusi (1962)
- Shahadat (1962)
- Faqir (1963)
- Ziyafat, Faqir (1963)
- Az Pa Niyoftadeha (1963)
- Dah Lal-bazi (1963)
- Entezar (1964)
- Khaneha-ra Kharab Konid (1964)
- Behtarin Baba-ye Donya (1965)
- Chub be-dast'ha-ye Varazil (1965)
- Panj Nemayeshnameh az Enqelab-e Mashrutiyat (1966)
- A-ye bi Kolah, A-ye ba Kolah (1967)
- Khane-ye Roshani (1967)
- Dikte va Zaviye (1968)
- Parvar Bandan (1969)
- Ma Nemishenavim (1970)
- Vay bar Maghlub (1970)
- Janeshin (1970)
- Chesm dar barabar-e Chesm (1971)
- Aqebat-e Qalam-Farsayi (1975)
- Ruh-e Chah (1978)
- Mah-e Asal (1978)
- Ghambad (1983)
- Do Nemayeshnameh (1986)
- Khayyat-e Afsun Shodeh (1988)
- Mar dar Mabad (1993)
- Lal-baziha (3rd edition - Dec. 1353 /1975/)

Stories and Novels

- Aftab Mahtab (1955)
- Morgh-e Anjir (1956)
- Khaneha-ye Shahr-e Rey (1957)
- Khane-ye Barf (1959)
- Shabneshini ba Shokuh (1960)
- Geda (1962)
- Qodrat-e Taze (1962)
- Do Baradar (1962)
- Raz (1963)
- Azadaran-e Bayal (1964)
- Dandil (1966)
- Shafa-ye Ajel (1966)
- Vahemeha-ye bi Nam va Neshan (1967)
- Gomshode-ye lab-e Darya (1967)
- Mahdi-ye Digar (1967)
- Tars va Larz (1968)
- Tup (1969)
- Maqtal (1970)
- Gur va Gahvareh (1973)
- Bazi Tamam Shod (1974)
- Madkhali bar yek Dastan-e Boland (1977)
- Vagon-e Siyah (1979)
- Dar Aghaz-e Sofreh (1980)
- Ey-vay To Ham? (1981)
- Ashoftehal-e Bidarbakht (1981)
- Jarukesh-e Saqf-e Aseman (1981)
- Sejane (1982)
- Dar Sarache-ye Dabbaghan (1983)
- Kelas-e Dars (1983)
- Agar Mara Bezanand (1983)
- Mir-e Mohanna (1986)
- Shanbe Shoru Shod (1986)
- Dastan-e Esma'il (1986)
- Mehmani (1988)
- Sandvich (1989)
- Sedakhune (1990)
- Padgan-e Khakestari (1990)
- Gharibe dar Shahr (1990)
- Maqtal (1993)
- Tatar-e Khandan (1994)
- Ashghalduni (?)

Screenplays

- Fasl-e Gostakhi (1969)
- Gav (1969)
- Afiyatgah (1988)

Children's Books

- Kaleybar (1970)
- Marand (1970)
- Kalat-e Nan (1976)
- Kalat-e Kar (1978)
- Yeki Yekdane (1983)

== Short Analysis of One of His Short Stories, Two Brothers ==
In Two Brothers, he pictures the life of two brothers in search of a calm and free life without the presence of each other. In 1967, after a long pause the notions of Realism were started again in Persian literature, and since Sa’edi had the history of receiving medical education, he developed his characters to show human illusions in their social lives. The use of realism in his works provides readers with the chance to relate to the characters. He questions the truth between the two brothers and readers wonder who has the right to blame the other. This use of verisimilitude in Sa’edi's Two Brothers creates a division between the reality he is depicting and the one in our minds.

Sa’edi was a famous Persian doctor and writer who contributed a great deal in Persian literature with his realistic point of view. With picturing inferior social facts of his time, he started a new path of realism in Persian literature. He started writing as a career by imitating other authors of his time and their styles. He was so much under the influence of Sadegh Hedayat that even attempted suicide. He changed his believes and political ideas in the course of his life and suffered a few months in prison.

== Translations of Saedi's Works ==
- Gholam-Hossein Saedi, The Cannon (توپ), translated by Faridoun Farrokh (ِIbex Publishers). ISBN 978-1-58814-068-5.
- Gholam-Hossein Saedi, The Mourners of Bayal (عزاداران بیل), translated by Edris Ranji (ِIbex Publishers). ISBN 978-1-588141-49-1.
- Gholam-Hossein Saedi, Paura e tremore (ترس و لرز), translated into Italian by Felicetta Ferraro (Ponte33). ISBN 978-88-96908-14-3

== See also ==
- Iranian Azerbaijanis
- Mohammad-Ali Jamalzadeh
- Mina Assadi
- Mohammad Hanif (Iranian writer)

Dandil:Stories from Iranian Life by Gholam-Hossein Sa'edi, translated by Hasan Javadi, Robert Campbell and Julie Maisami with an introduction by H.Javadi, Random House 1981. Hasan Javadi, Satire in Persian Literature, Fairleigh Dickinson University Publications, 1985.

== Notes ==
Minoo Southgate translated Sa'edi's Tars va Larz. The title of the translation, which is preceded by a long introduction, is Fear and Trembling, published by Three Continents Press.
