= Mehrzad Boroujerdi =

Iranian political scientist

- مهرزاد بروجردی
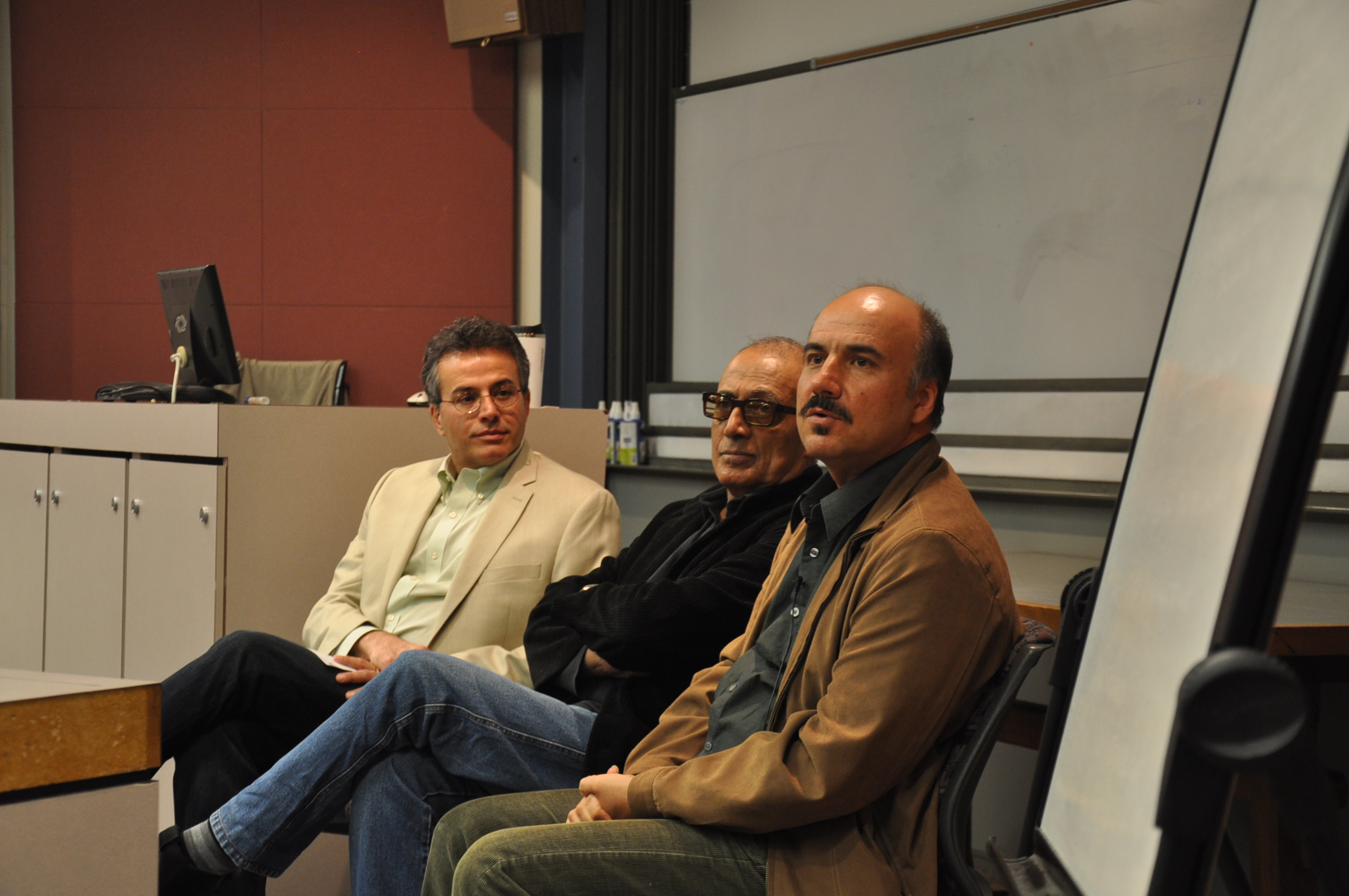
- Boroujerdi (on the left) alongside Abbas Kiarostami (middle) in Syracuse University

Academic background
- Education: American University (PhD)
- Thesis: Orientalism in Reverse: Iranian Intellectuals and the West, 1960–1990 (1990)
- Doctoral advisor: Şerif Mardin, Nicholas Onuf, Ahmad Ashraf
- Other advisors: Ali Mirsepassi, Mehdi Aminrazavi

Academic work
- Discipline: Political science
- Sub-discipline: Iranian studies
- Institutions: Missouri University of Science and Technology
- Website: http://mehrzadboroujerdi.com/

Mehrzad Boroujerdi (born in Aghajari, Iran) is an Iranian political scientist. He is currently the vice provost and dean of College of Arts, Sciences and Education at Missouri University of Science and Technology.

== Life ==
Boroujerdi was born in Aghajari, and spent his youth in the Khuzestan province, Iran. Shortly before the Iranian Revolution, he emigrated to the United States to pursue his studies. He received his B.A. in political science with a minor in sociology from Boston University in 1983 (magna cum laude), his M.A. from Northwestern University in 1985, and his PhD from the American University in Washington, D.C. in 1990. He subsequently held post-doctoral position at Harvard University and Rockefeller Foundation fellow at the University of Texas at Austin.

He was the former president of Association for Iranian Studies, the oldest Iranian studies research group in the western hemisphere, a former fellow of American Council on Education.

His 1996 book Iranian Intellectuals and the West has been widely reviewed by scholars such as Mohamad Tavakoli-Targhi, Ali Mirsepassi, Abbas Milani, Farhang Rajaee, Gawdat Bahgat, Saïd Amir Arjomand, Ebrahim Biparva, William B. Quandt, Stephanie Cronin, Misagh Parsa, and Nikki Keddie among others.

== Selected publications ==
=== Monographs ===
- Boroujerdi, Mehrzad; Rahimkhani, Kourosh (2018). Postrevolutionary Iran: A Political Handbook. Syracuse University Press. doi:10.2307/j.ctt20p56tf. ISBN 978-0-8156-3574-1. JSTOR j.ctt20p56tf.
- Boroujerdi, Mehrzad (2010). Tarāshīdam, parastīdam, shikastam : guftārhāʼ-i dar sīyāsat va huvīyat-i Irānī (I carved, worshiped and shattered: essays on Iranian politics and identity) (in Persian). Nashr-i Nigāh-i Muʻāṣir. hdl:10919/96489.
- Boroujerdi, Mehrzad (1996-11-01). Iranian Intellectuals and the West: The Tormented Triumph of Nativism. Syracuse University Press. ISBN 978-0-8156-0433-4.

=== Edited volumes ===
- Mirror For the Muslim Prince: Islam and the Theory of Statecraft. Syracuse University Press. 2013. JSTOR j.ctt1j1w04g.
