= Iran: A Modern History =

2017 history book by Abbas Amanat

- Author: Abbas Amanat
- Language: English
- Subject: History of Iran from Safavids to 2009
- Genre: History book
- Published: 2017; ebook and printed edition: 2018; first audiobook: 1397 SH (2018 or 2019); first Persian translation: 2022; first Chinese translation
- Publisher: Yale University Press
- Publication place: United States of America
- Pages: 1028
- Award: The Times newspaper's Book of the Week; was among Choice Outstanding Academic Titles in 2018
- ISBN: 9780300112542
- OCLC: 971223468
- Dewey Decimal: 955.03
- LC Class: DS272 .A435 2017

Iran: A Modern History is a history book by Abbas Amanat, historian and university professor, first published in 2017 by Yale University Press. The book, which took nearly twenty years to complete, offers an account and analysis of five centuries of Iranian history—from the background leading to the rise of the Safavid dynasty to the Green Movement of 2009. Iran was generally well received by critics.

== Content summary ==
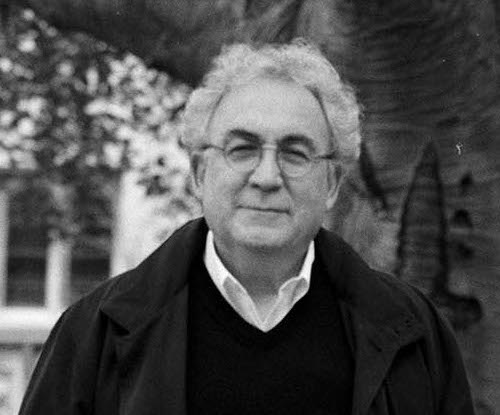
Abbas Amanat at Yale University (2020)

Iran: A Modern History is organized into four main parts and seventeen chapters, accompanied by a preface, introduction, and epilogue. In this book, Abbas Amanat presents and analyzes roughly five centuries of Iranian history after the Mongol era, tracing developments from the rise of the Safavid order to the Green Movement of 2009.

In 1501, a fifteen-year-old Isma'il declares himself king, founding the Safavid dynasty and forcibly imposing a Shi'i identity on his realm through violent decrees. The text places this rise within a broader early modern "Axial Age" of gunpowder empires, tracing the Safavids' evolution from a mystical Sufi order into a militant, messianic movement powered by zealous Qezilbash tribesmen. Isma'il's conquests and importation of Arab jurists build a clerical state, but his aura of invincibility is shattered by Ottoman artillery at the Battle of Chaldiran in 1514, plunging him into melancholy and leaving a legacy that fuses Persian kingship with Shi'ism. Under his son Tahmasp, rising jurist authority, Ottoman invasions, and devastating factionalism bring the empire to the brink of collapse by the late sixteenth century.

Shah Abbas I reshapes the empire by breaking Qezilbash power through a new army of slave soldiers armed with firearms. He reconquers lost territories, recapturing Tabriz and Baghdad, and builds Isfahan's grand Naqsh-e Jahan Square as a model Safavid city blending sacred and secular life. A royal silk monopoly and the forced migration of Armenian merchants to New Julfa fuel a new economy, while strategic diplomacy with European East India Companies helps expel the Portuguese from Hormuz. Intellectually, the mystical philosophy of Mulla Sadra flourishes, but the rise of the conservative cleric Majlesi, who emphasizes rigid orthodoxy and ritual, ultimately stifles creative promise.

The Safavid world collapses in 1722 when Isfahan falls to Afghan invaders, a defeat rooted in harem-reared princes, courtly vice, and the climate-driven pressures of the Little Ice Age that strengthened nomadic tribes. Nader Shah, a military genius, expels the Afghans and invades Mughal India, returning with legendary treasures like the Peacock Throne, but his destructive rule and failed religious reforms end with his assassination in 1747. The benevolent Karim Khan Zand governs wisely from Shiraz, refusing the title of shah, but his death plunges Iran back into civil war until the brutal Agha Mohammad Khan Qajar, a castrated hostage-turned-conqueror, establishes Tehran as the capital and founds a new dynasty through sheer ferocity.

The early Qajar era under Fath-Ali Shah sees partial stability and a dazzling court culture rooted in ancient Persian symbols, but this fragile consolidation is tested by European powers. Strategic entanglements with Britain and France against Russian territorial threats culminate in devastating military defeats and the humiliating Treaty of Torkamanchay. Domestically, a powerful Usuli clerical establishment emerges as a force of social control, stifling innovative thought. This spiritual void, combined with the trauma of foreign defeat, fuels religious dissent, exemplified by the messianic Babi movement that proclaims a new prophetic cycle.

Naser al-Din Shah's long reign is an era of fragile equilibrium where Iran survives intense foreign pressures without being colonized. The towering reformist chief minister Amir Kabir seeks to modernize the army but is brutally murdered by a conservative elite, illustrating deep obstacles to change. A flamboyant modernizer secures the scandalous Reuter Concession, which virtually sells the country's entire economic potential. Spiraling economic dependence on foreign banks and concessions sets the stage for the nationwide Tobacco Protest, where merchants, clergy, and ordinary citizens unite for the first time to successfully force the shah to repeal a foreign monopoly, heralding a new age of popular resistance.

In December 1905, the public beating of sugar merchants ignites a massive protest at Tehran's Friday mosque, where a preacher delivers a bold sermon introducing the novel concepts of law and a constitution, marking the birth of the Constitutional Revolution. The movement is fueled by new voices of dissent, including the odd ideological union of secular modernist Malkom Khan and political Islam pioneer Jamal al-Din Afghani. Exiled intellectuals craft a powerful discourse of decline by contrasting an idealized pre-Islamic past with a gloomy present. A dramatic sanctuary in the British legation transforms a limited protest into a call for a constitution, but the struggle to frame it explodes into civil war following the brutal bombardment of the parliament in 1908.

World War I devastates Iran as its declared neutrality is violated by Russian, British, and Ottoman forces, turning the country into a battleground and causing a famine and pandemic that kill nearly a million people. The widely despised 1919 Anglo-Persian Agreement is seen as reducing Iran to a British protectorate. Amid this chaos, the romantic Jangal movement's forest rebellion is crushed, and Reza Khan methodically consolidates power through a 1921 coup, quelling tribal revolts before dismantling the Qajar dynasty to establish his own Pahlavi monarchy.

By 1925, the old order is finished. An engineered vote abolishes the Qajars, with lonely deputies delivering symbolic protests likened to a eulogy for the Constitutional Revolution. Four key ministers build the Pahlavi state, modernizing finances, the judiciary, and infrastructure, but each is later destroyed by Reza Shah's paranoid despotism. Sweeping social engineering tears through old Tehran, enforces dress codes, and mandates the unveiling of women, an act that both liberates a generation and unravels the ancient pact between the state and the Shi'i clergy. the Allied invasion of 1941 swiftly deflates the shah's image and forces his humiliating abdication, leaving a contested legacy of transformative modernization built on brutal autocracy.

The 1941 occupation shatters two decades of Pahlavi sovereignty claims, triggering a tumultuous period of political instability yet also a renewed struggle for democracy. Mohammad Mosaddeq's rise is an unavoidable nationalist response to foreign meddling, and he champions the nationalization of oil during a turbulent premiership beset by British embargoes and internal fractures. The 1953 CIA-backed coup ends this fragile experiment with participatory politics and is described as an unhealed wound in the Iranian psyche, ushering in the return of arbitrary Pahlavi rule and shaping a lasting narrative of victimization and anti-Western sentiment.

The Shah's post-1953 rule brings relative prosperity and land reform but generates deep discontent, particularly among migrants who later turn to the radical clergy. His White Revolution modernizes the country while dismantling traditional village life. The dramatic rise of Ruhollah Khomeini as opposition leader culminates in the violent June 1963 uprising, which is brutally crushed but establishes him as a symbol of resistance. In the cultural sphere, prominent poets and writers give voice to profound political disillusionment and a dark, desperate longing for a savior that foreshadows the coming revolution.

The decade from 1963 to 1973 marks the shah's best years of economic growth, but the warning of the 1963 uprising is ignored. The post-1973 oil boom ultimately unsettles socio-political balances, while Prime Minister Hoveyda's tenure cultivates a culture of sycophantic obedience. An extravagant 1971 Persepolis celebration excludes ordinary Iranians and highlights the monarch's deepening delusions. In this climate, popular culture channels widespread social disillusionment, and intellectual figures like Jalal Al-e Ahmad and Ali Shari'ati captivate a generation by transforming Shi'ism into a radical ideology of revolutionary protest against a "plague of Westoxication."

The Iranian Revolution unfolds swiftly between 1978 and 1979, a strange ideological mix of leftist ideas, anti-Western sentiment, and political Islam that evolves into a monolithic movement led by Khomeini. A regime article insulting Khomeini ignites deadly riots, and cycles of forty-day mourning commemorations swell the protests. The bloody crackdown of "Black Friday" shatters any hope for reconciliation, and Khomeini shrewdly exploits his Paris exile to amplify his message. The shah's tearful departure is followed by Khomeini's triumphant return, and the army's neutrality declaration completes the regime's downfall, an outcome the text frames as an unavoidable popular, Islamic revolution after decades of autocratic rule.

Khomeini breaks decisively with the Shi'i quietist tradition through his doctrine of the "governance of the jurist," framing it as a divine duty to erect an Islamic government and a battle against Western colonialism. A new kind of revolutionary mullah emerges, products of both madrasa and secular education who are radicalized by anti-imperialist struggles. This coalition of bazaar merchants and lay Islamist modernists helps make Khomeini palatable to the middle class, but they are quickly discarded once the clerics consolidate power. Khomeini cultivates a messianic aura, blending Qur'anic concepts with socialist rhetoric to mobilize the urban poor as the "Imam of the disinherited."

In the eighteen months following the revolution, the Islamic Republic rapidly consolidates power through flurries of institution-building while navigating crises from ethnic uprisings to the American hostage crisis. A clerically dominated Assembly of Experts enshrines the supreme authority of the guardian jurist in a theocratic constitution riddled with contradictions. The first president's moderate Islamist vision is crushed by hardliners, triggering a "reign of terror" that purges the Mojahedin, the left, and even former allies. An Islamic Cultural Revolution closes universities for three years to obliterate secular and Western influences.

The hostage crisis, where radical students seize the US Embassy with Khomeini's endorsement, consolidates his power, destroys US-Iran relations, and fosters a propaganda-driven street culture. The devastating war with Iraq, launched by Saddam Hussein, initially unifies the country through a potent culture of martyrdom, with human wave attacks linked to the Battle of Karbala. Even after repelling Iraq, Khomeini prolongs the war in a costly messianic vision that ends in humiliating stalemate. The era concludes with vengeful 1988 mass executions of political prisoners, the Rushdie fatwa, and the dismissal of his designated heir before Khomeini's death ends the revolution's charismatic first phase.

Post-revolutionary Iran undergoes profound transformation as the old elite are purged and replaced by a new ruling class of Khomeinist clergy, their privileged relatives, and war veterans. A demographic revolution creates a youthful, literate society whose political agency the regime both relies upon and denies. The reform movement under Khatami is crushed by hard-liners despite a massive popular mandate, while Ahmadinejad's demagogic presidency squanders oil wealth and empowers the Revolutionary Guards' economic empire. A vibrant culture of dissent persists through filmmakers and musicians who defy censorship, and the brutally crushed 2009 Green Movement reveals an unbroken, simmering popular demand for freedom.

== Release and reception ==
Iran: A Modern History was first published as a 1028-page volume in 2017 with both print and electronic formats by Yale University Press. A year later, an audiobook edition, approximately 42 hours long and narrated by Derek Perkins, was released by Tantor Media. In Tehran, the first Persian translation of the book—titled تاریخ ایران مدرن (lit. 'History of Modern Iran') and comprising 1,107 pages—was published without copyright permission; it was translated by Mohammad Aghajari and released in 1397 SH (2018 or 2019 AD) by the Pārseh Institute for Translation and Book Publishing. In 2022, Ji Kaiyun, director of the Center for Iranian Studies at Southwest University in China, together with Xing Wenhai and Li Xin, published the first Chinese translation of the work under the title 伊朗五百年 (lit. 'Five Hundred Years of Iran') through People's Daily Press in Beijing.

=== Critical response ===
Iran: A Modern History was generally well received by critics. Fatima Raza from Strategic Studies is unequivocally positive, endorsing the book as a "masterpiece" and an "invigorating read" for those with prior knowledge of the region. She believes it successfully combines detailed articulation with rigorous analysis, creating a work that stands at par with Shahnameh on Persian civilization. Steve Donoghue writing for Open Letters Monthly offers also a highly positive assessment of the book, characterizing it as a "magisterial" and essential text. Donoghue endorses the book as "essential reading," particularly for Western audiences unfamiliar with this history, citing its broad scope, deep detail, and surprisingly readable narrative style. The final verdict is that the work's value lies not only in its comprehensive historical account but also in Amanat's masterful storytelling, which elevates the text to offer readers a profound and engaging historical experience. Monica Ringer of International Journal of Middle East Studies notes two primary shortcomings: first, the absence of footnotes constitutes a significant drawback for scholars, a lacuna only partially compensated for by the annotated bibliography; and second, she describes the prevalence of typographical errors as "distracting" for such a seminal work. Despite these editorial and production flaws, she is overwhelmingly positive, declaring Iran to be "a milestone" that "will continue to be required reading in Iranian history for generations to come." Ringer affirms its value for both undergraduate students and specialist scholars, praising Amanat's interpretive insights and his successful synthesis of a vast and complex field. Paul Lay delivers a highly favorable assessment of Iran, positioning the book as a monumental and invaluable scholarly work that provides essential context for understanding contemporary Iran. Lay argues that the book's primary achievement is revealing the deep, complex, and often contradictory cultural and historical foundations that have shaped the nation over five centuries, moving beyond the typical Western focus on 20th-century political events. He endorses the book as a "revelation" and an "invaluable survey," believing it successfully corrects superficial understandings of Iran by providing a deep, nuanced, and culturally rich historical narrative that is essential for grasping the country's past and its distinct identity.

For the Middle East Quarterly, Michael Rubin offers a bifurcated assessment of Amanat's book. He acknowledges the work as a "rich, detailed, nuanced" magnum opus that serves as an excellent resource for understanding Iran's history and culture up until 1979. However, he argues that the book's credibility is significantly undermined when it addresses the period following the Islamic Revolution, citing factual inaccuracies and significant omissions—particularly regarding Iranian-sponsored terrorism. Rubin juxtaposes these omissions with Amanat's stated goal to "humanize Iranian society" and move "beyond the misconceptions," concluding that for him, these flaws undermine that goal and erode the book's credibility when dealing with recent history. Justin Marozzi of The Sunday Times praises Amanat's research as masterful, extensive, and profound. Ervand Abrahamian of The New York Review of Books lauds it as a majestic contribution to untangling the complexities of Iran's past. C. P. W. Gammell of the Literary Review calls it "a truly great book" and "history at its most rewarding," highlighting its rigorous, clear, unbiased, and accurate analysis. Massoud Farasati characterizes it as the most important Iranian history book available and superior to Abrahamian's A History of Modern Iran, recommending it to anyone seeking a grounding in Iran's past. Amir Taheri, chairman of the Gatestone Institute, criticizes the book for following "received ideas" and "the standard Western scholars' view" of Iranian history, while praising Amanat's account of the Islamic Republic as "refreshingly balanced."

=== Accolades ===
The Times selected the book as its Book of the Week; it was also among the Choice Outstanding Academic Titles in 2018.

== See also ==
- Iran Between Two Revolutions
- The Cambridge History of Iran
- The Comprehensive History of Iran
