= Ehsan Naraghi =

Ehsan Naraghi احسان نراقی
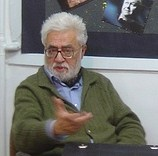
- Born: 2 February 1926; Kashan, Iran
- Died: 2 December 2012 (aged 86); Tehran, Iran
- Education: Dar ol-Fonoon
- Occupations: Sociologist, writer
- Title: Legion of Honour
- Spouse: Angel Sheybani (1959–2012)

Ehsān Narāghi (2 February 1926 – 2 December 2012; Persian: احسان نراقی) was an Iranian sociologist, writer and Farah Pahlavi adviser

== Education ==
During his high school he went to Dar ol-Fonoon in Tehran. Then he studied sociology in the University of Geneva and received his PhD at Sorbonne University in Paris.

== Career ==
In Iran, he was a professor of sociology and director of the Social Studies and Research at the University of Tehran (Iran). As a sociologist, he has collaborated for many years in the work of international scientific associations. In 1965, he prepared for the United Nations the first worldwide study on the "Brain Drain". He has written widely on sociological issues in developing countries, and in 1970 he gave courses on youth, education and society in the Third World countries, at the University of Paris VIII: Vincennes—Saint-Denis.

After his experience of being jailed during the Islamic Revolution of Iran, he wrote his book "From Palace to Prison: Inside the Iranian Revolution".

He was the first major sociologist who investigated brain-drain phenomenon due to migration of the third world's best intellectuals to developed countries. Some of his works were featured in a chapter of a book by the Iranian Sociologist, Ali Mirsepassi in Mirsepassi, Ali (2019). "Ehsan Naraghi:: Chronicle of a Man for All Seasons". Iran's Quiet Revolution The Downfall of the Pahlavi State. The Global Middle East. Cambridge University Press. pp. 58–106. doi:10.1017/9781108641852.004. ISBN 978-1-108-48589-0. S2CID 241890226.

He was a member of UNESCO as a director of UNESCO's Youth Division for many years, and, after his retirement, as an advisor to the Director General of UNESCO until 1999.

== Awards and honours ==
He was the only Iranian who was awarded Légion d'honneur medal twice, once by De Gaulle, and then by Mitterrand.

== Death ==
He died on 2 December 2012 after a long illness.

== Works and publications ==
- Naraghi, Ehsan (1991). Des palais du Shah aux prisons de la révolution (in French). Balland. ISBN 9782715808751. ISSN 1152-0914.
- Naraghi, Ehsan (2007). From Palace to Prison: Inside the Iranian Revolution. I B Tauris & Co Ltd. p. 301. ISBN 978-1-566-63767-1.
- Naraghi, Ehsan (1995). Enseignement et changements sociaux en Iran du VIIe au XXe siècle - Islam et laïcité, leçons d'une expérience séculaire (in French). Les Editions de la MSH. ISBN 978-2-735-10432-1.
- Naraghi, Ehsan (1967). "La sociologie et la société en Iran". Revue Française de Sociologie (in French). 8 (2): 184–188. doi:10.2307/3319238. JSTOR 3319238.
- Naraghi, Ehsan (June 1989). "The Republic's citizens of honor". UNESCO Courier. 42 (6): 12+. ISSN 0041-5278.
- Naraghi, Ehsan (November 1992). "Religion, secularism and democracy". UNESCO Courier. 45 (11): 38+. ISSN 0041-5278.
- Naraghi, Ehsan (December 1994). "Roads to revolution". UNESCO Courier. 47 (12): 22. ISSN 0041-5278.
- Naraghi, Ehsan (1976). "The Cultural Identity of Iran and the Contemporary World". The New Review of Two Worlds (in French): 287–298. ISSN 0151-914X. JSTOR 44197313.
- Naraghi, Ehsan (1957). "Les Classes Moyennes en Iran". Cahiers Internationaux de Sociologie. 22: 156–173. ISSN 0008-0276. JSTOR 40689157.
- Naraghi, Ehsan; Peroncel-Hugoz, JP (1989). "LA FRANCE ET L'IRAN: CHANGEMENT DE CAP: Entretien avec le sociologue iranien Ehsan Naraghi". Esprit (1940-). 156 (11): 127–131. ISSN 0014-0759. JSTOR 24274444.
- Naraghi, Ehsan (1972). "Unesco, youth and the regeneration of education". Prospects. 2 (1): 233–238. doi:10.1007/BF02195800. ISSN 1573-9090. S2CID 143848892.
- Naraghi, Ehsan (2007). "Signification et portée des recherches sur la société en Iran". Social Science Information. 7 (1): 107–135. doi:10.1177/053901846800700612. S2CID 144097487.
- Naraghi, Ehsan (2007). "The Islamic Antecedents of the Western Renaissance". Diogenes. 44 (1): 73–106. doi:10.1177/039219219604417307. S2CID 144281195.
- Naraghi, Ehsan (1965). "Problèmes sociaux de l'industrialisation dans un pays du Tiers Monde" [SOCIAL PROBLEMS OF INDUSTRIALISATION IN A DEVELOPING COUNTRY]. Civilisations (in French). 15 (4): 504–518. ISSN 0009-8140. JSTOR 41230907.
- Naraghi, Ehsan (1967). "L'EXODE DES COMPÉTENCES: Un obstacle majeur au développement" [BRAIN DRAIN: A major obstacle to development]. Politique étrangère (in French). 8 (184): 269–279. doi:10.3406/polit.1967.2184. ISSN 0032-342X. JSTOR 42669311.

== See also ==
- Intellectual movements in Iran
- University of Geneva
