= Ali M. Ansari =

British professor

Ali Massoud Ansari FRSE
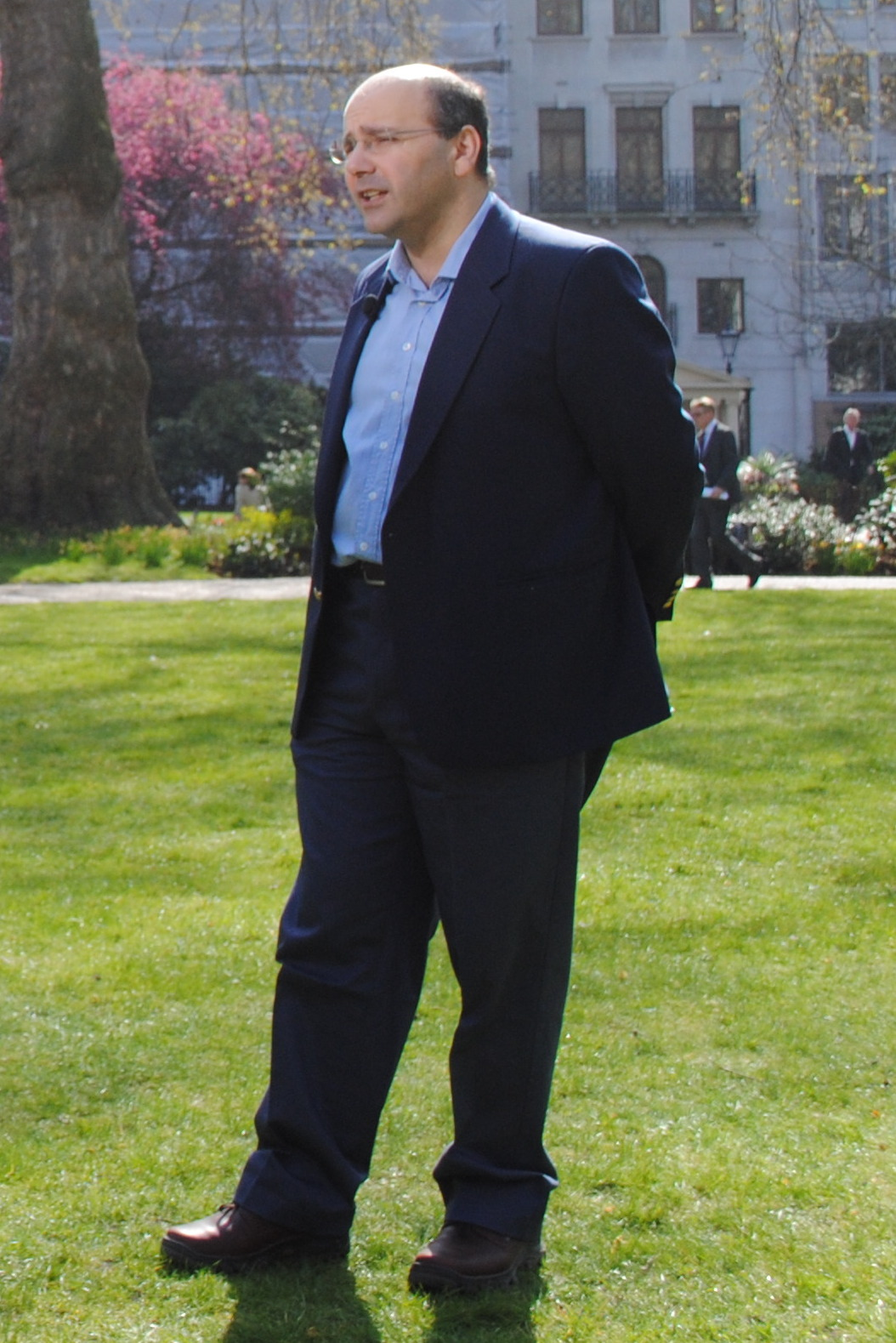
- Ali Ansari speaking to Fox News about Iran in 2012
- Born: Ali Massoud Ansari; 24 November 1967 (age 58); Rome, Italy
- Spouse: Marjon Esfandiary
- Father: Mohammad Ali Massoud Ansari
- Relatives: Ahmad Ali Ansari (brother)

Academic background
- Education: University College London; King's College London; School of Oriental and African Studies
- Thesis: Shah Mohammad Reza Pahlavi & the Myth of Imperial Authority (1998)
- Doctoral advisor: Charles R. H. Tripp
- Other advisors: Farhang Rajaee, David d'Avray

Academic work
- Discipline: Historian
- Sub-discipline: Iranian studies
- Institutions: University of St Andrews

Ali Massoud Ansari (Persian: علی مسعود انصاری, born 24 November 1967 in Rome) is a Professor in Modern History with reference to the Middle East at the University of St Andrews in Scotland, where he is also the founding director of the Institute for Iranian Studies.

== Education and career ==
Ansari was educated at Colonel Brown Cambridge School Dehradun, Royal Russell School, University College London (BA), King's College London (MA), and obtained his PhD from the University of London's School of Oriental and African Studies (SOAS).

He is also an Associate Fellow at Chatham House and sits on the Governing Council of the British Institute of Persian Studies (BIPS). He is a regular speaker at conferences and events regarding Iran, including "Iran's New Parliament" at the New America Foundation. His work appears in The Guardian, The Independent, and the New Statesman, among other publications.

In March 2016 Ansari was elected a Fellow of the Royal Society of Edinburgh, Scotland's National Academy for science and letters.

== Personal life ==
Ansari is the son of Mariam Dariabegi and Mohammad Ali Massoud Ansari, cousin of Farah Pahlavi. He married Marjon Esfandiary in 2010, after which he had a celebration held at Chatham House.

== Selected bibliography ==
- Modern Iran Since 1921: the Pahlavis and After (2003)
- Confronting Iran: The Failure of American Foreign Policy and the Roots of Mistrust (2006)
- Iran Under Ahmadinejad (2008)
- The Politics of Nationalism in Modern Iran (2012)
- Iran: A Very Short Introduction (2014)
- Iran’s Constitutional Revolution of 1906 and Narratives of the Enlightenment (2016)
- Iran, Islam and Democracy: The Politics of Managing Change, 3rd Edition (2019)
- Iran (2024)
