= Ahmad Fardid =

Iranian philosopher (1910–1994)

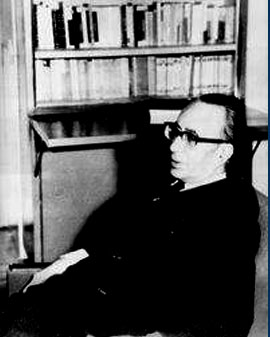
Ahmad Fardid

Seyyed Ahmad Fardid (Persian: سید احمد فردید; 1910, Yazd – 16 August 1994, Tehran), born Ahmad Mahini Yazdi, was a prominent Iranian philosopher and a professor of Tehran University.

He is considered to be among the philosophical ideologues of the Islamic government of Iran which came to power in 1979, following the revolution. Fardid was under the influence of Martin Heidegger, the influential German philosopher, whom he considered "the only Western philosopher who understood the world and the only philosopher whose insights were congruent with the principles of the Islamic Republic. These two figures, Khomeini and Heidegger, helped Fardid argue his position."

== Early life and education ==
Ahmad Fardid was born in 1910 in Yazd. His father, Seyyed Ali Marvi, was a small scale farmer. In 1922, at the age of 12, he began to attend Islamic and secular schools in Yazd, where he started to learn Arabic, as well as philosophy and mathematics. At the same time, his father employed a private tutor to teach him French.

In 1926, Fardid moved to Tehran to start middle-school at Soltani High School, where he began to attend study meetings with scholars of Islamic studies.

Two years later, in 1928, he commenced classes at Dar al-Fonun, notably the first modern university and modern institution of higher learning in Iran.

Fardid later studied philosophy at Sorbonne and University of Heidelberg.

== Philosophy ==
=== Influence of Heidegger ===
The sparsity of Fardid’s written work has led to his recognition as an "oral philosopher". This was, to be sure, a puzzling attribute. Although Fardid tried to justify his expository reluctance to the poverty and contamination of the language, (in the Heideggerian sense) some suspect his reticence stemmed from his paralyzing perfectionism.

Fardid's turbulent intellect was absorbed in the enterprise of synthesizing (promisingly or otherwise) the results of his studies of Eastern civilizations with the Western philosophy, as interpreted by Heidegger. Fardid's project remains unfinished and fraught with shortcomings and errors. Nevertheless, it remains an enormously intriguing and valuable endeavor. Heidegger himself on several occasions (including in his encounters with D.T. Suzuki concerning "transmetaphysical thinking" and in his valedictory interview with Der Spiegel) optimistically alluded to the possibility of a convergence of Eastern and Western thought but he never explored the subject matter himself, citing a lack of knowledge and insight about the non-Western universe of discourse. Ahmad Fardid, from his corner, hoped to produce a blueprint for the endeavor, but he succeeded only in vaguely adumbrating certain contours of it. His influence is evident in the work of many philosophers in modern Iran, even if that is left concealed in their biographies and writings due to the criticism that is generally directed at his thinking by intellectuals with liberal and leftist politics.

=== Criticism of anthropocentrism and rationalism ===
Fardid decried the anthropocentrism and rationalism brought by classical Greece, replacing the authority of God and faith with human reason, and in that regard he also criticized Islamic philosophers like al-Farabi and Mulla Sadra for having absorbed Greek philosophy.

== Legacy ==
Fardid coined the concept of "Westoxication" which was then popularized by Jalal Al-e-Ahmad on his then widely known book Gharbzadegi, and after the Iranian Revolution of 1979, became among the core ideological teachings of the new Islamic government of Iran. Among those influenced by his thought are also included "the theoretician of Islamic cinema", Morteza Avini, and the former conservative president, Ahmadinejad.

== Quotes ==
- My wish is to be free from the modern cave, which is filled with self-founded nihilism, enchantment by earthly gods (taghutzadegi), and historicism. This is my ideal, and wherever I see a lack of angered fists and the prevalence of compromise, I will be disappointed... because to possess and insist on a position is the right move.
- Weststruckness has dominated us for a hundred years... The youth are looking for the God of the yesteryears and that of the future. They are looking for the God of the Qur᾽an, while the nihilistic and self-founded history of the contemporary world has put down deep roots among us.
- There is no way to find democracy in the Qur’an. The Islamic Government is achieving the truth of the ”day before yesterday” and the “day after tomorrow.” Democracy belongs to Greece, and they embody idolatry.
- Humanism has nothing to do with the human. In the Universal Declaration of Human Rights, there is no trace of the human... It is all about liberty, equality, and fraternity of the ego (nafsi ammarah) and the satanic self.
- In accordance with Heidegger, I put forward a historical position [mowghef]. Mankind is in a historical age when God is absent, the true God... Now, human is the Truth which is apparent, that, human is god, and the Greek taghut [idolatry] embodies the human. This is the humanism that I previously mentioned: humanism and human taghut [idolatry].
- Mysticism's one eye has been blinded by wahdat al-vojud ("Unity of Being'), and the other one has been blinded by Bergson. According to Bergson, there is turbulence in the world. Where is presence? Where is God? I hope the human dies of the unrest. This intrinsic (natural) wisdom [esnokherad], which is like darkness, appears like lightness for Bergson. Bergson's gnosis is one of the examples of Westoxification. In fact, there is no gnosis in the West. During the last four hundred years, philosophy in the West has focused on the actually existing reality (mowjud). In fact, you can not find any question about "existence" [vojud] in the nineteenth century, and all discussion were centered on mowjud.
