= Pivot of the Universe =

1997 book by Abbas Amanat

Pivot of the Universe: Nasir al-Din Shah Qajar and the Iranian Monarchy, 1831–1896
- Author: Abbas Amanat
- Language: English
- Subject: Naser al-Din Shah Qajar's reign
- Genre: history book
- Published: 1997
- Publisher: University of California Press
- Dewey Decimal: 955.04092
- LC Class: DS307.N38 A63 1997

Pivot of the Universe is a 1997 book by Abbas Amanat, published by the University of California Press. The book is a biography of Nasir al-Din Shah Qajar's reign (1848–1896), centered on court intrigue, foreign pressure, and selective modernization.

== Summary ==
The book traces Nasir al-Din Shah Qajar from his lonely childhood as the child of an unhappy dynastic marriage, through his accession in 1848 amid Babi revolts and foreign intrigue, to his long reign marked by the execution of Amir Kabir, the Herat war, the dismissal of Nuri, and his eventual abolition of the premiership in favor of direct rule. It shows him balancing Britain and Russia, selectively adopting modern technology while resisting reform, cultivating Shi'ite royal legitimacy, and growing increasingly autocratic and isolated until his assassination in 1896.

== Release and reception ==
Pivot of the Universe by Abbas Amanat was published in 1997 by the University of California Press, and it was generally well received by critics.
