= Alefba =

Alefba (Persian: الفبا) means alphabet. It is also name of a Persian-language literary magazine with two periods of publication, one in Iran before the 1979 revolution and another thereafter in France. Gholam-Hossein Sa'edi was the editor of both versions. In Iran the publisher was Amir Kabir Publishers, while in France the publisher was the "Association of Iranian Writers in Exile".

== Tehran ==
Several Iranian literary magazines emerged in 1960s and 1970s as a result of new authors and increased literary production in the country. In 1973, Amir Kabir Publishers invested 25,000 toman (about $3,500) in a new quarterly literary magazine, Alefba, and selected Gholamhoseyn Sa'edi to be the editor. Aside from the editorial labor, Sa'edi was responsible for its choosing its title, as well as penning the calligraphy decorating the cover. Alefba quickly gained status as one of Iran's top literary journals and famous Iranian intellectuals, such as Simin Daneshvar, had their works published in it. Nevertheless, Sa'edi frequently selected works of previously unpublished writers or writers he knew personally to be published, and esteemed the political independence of the magazine, which featured writers with different worldviews. In 1974, Sa'edi was arrested by SAVAK, the late shah's secret police. He edited first six issues of the magazine between 1973 and 1976. The last issue of Alefba (last issue in Tehran) was published in 1977.

== Paris ==
After the revolution, in 1982, Gholamhoseyn Sa'edi fled to France. Within months of his exile, together with the Association of Iranian Writers in Exile, Sa'edi began to publish a new version of Alefba in Paris. He continued to edit the magazine until his untimely death in 1985. The final 1986 issue is a collection of Sa'edi's previously unpublished works. Sa'edi wrote that the goal of Alefba was "to keep alive the Iranian art and culture which the Islamic Republic oppresses." In addition to publishing works of numerous other Iranians in exile, Alefba was the sole literary venue in which Sa'edi published his own works in exile.
