= Abbas Amanat =

Iranian historian (born 1947)

- عباس امانت
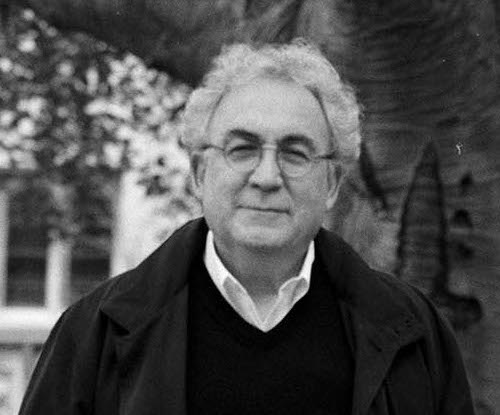
- Amanat in 2020
- Born: 14 November 1947 (age 78); Iran
- Occupations: William Graham Sumner Professor of History at Yale University; Director of the Yale Program in Iranian Studies

Academic background
- Education: Oxford University (D.Phil.); Tehran University (B.A.); Alborz High School
- Thesis: The Early Years of the Babi Movement: Background and Development (1981)
- Doctoral advisor: Albert Hourani and John Gurney
- Other advisor: Hamid Enayat

Academic work
- Discipline: Modern History
- Institutions: Yale University
- Doctoral students: Michael Rubin
- Main interests: Iranian studies, Qajar Iran
- Notable works: Iran: A Modern History; Pivot of the Universe: Nasir al-Din Shah Qajar and the Iranian Monarchy, 1831 – 1896

Abbas Amanat (Persian: عباس امانت; born November 14, 1947) is an Iranian-born American historian, scholar, author, editor, and university professor. He serves as the William Graham Sumner Professor of History Emeritus at Yale University and Director of the Yale Program in Iranian Studies.

== Early life and education ==
Amanat is a graduate of Alborz High School (Tehran, 1966). He received his B.A. degree from Tehran University in social sciences in 1971 and his D.Phil. from the Faculty of Oriental Studies, Oxford University in 1981. He studied with Albert Hourani and John Gurney as well as with Wilfred Madelung, Roger Owen, Hamid Enayat and Wilfred Knapp. The external examiner of his D.Phil. dissertation: "Emergence and Early Development of the Babi Movement, 1844–1850", successfully defended in Hilary 1981, was A.K.S. Lambton. He later was appointed as a Fellow of St. Catherine's College, Oxford (1981–82). He is the brother of architect Hossein Amanat and Mehrdad Amanat (a historian and an author).

== Career ==
Amanat began teaching first in the Program of Religious Studies at SUNY Stony Brook in 1982 and soon after was appointed as an assistant professor in the Department of History, Yale University in the fall of 1983. As of 2020, he is professor of history and director of the Yale Program in Iranian Studies. Amanat is a historian of Iran, Shia Islam, and the modern Middle East.

He specializes in Qajar Iran as well as in the history of messianic and apocalyptic movements in the Islamic world. Among other topics, he has written about Iranian identity and changing attitudes among Iranians over time. Amanat was a Carnegie Scholar of Islamic Studies (2005–2007) and the recipient of the Mellon-Sawyer Grant for comparative study of millennialism (1998–2001). He was the Editor-in-Chief of Iranian Studies, journal of the International Association for Iranian Studies (1991–98), and chair of the Council on Middle East Studies at Yale University (1993–2004).

Amanat is the Consulting Editor for Qajar History at the Encyclopædia Iranica. He is the author of 25 entries in the Encyclopædia Iranica on the history of the Qajar period, including: "Constitutional Revolution," "Court and Courtiers: Qajar Period," "Fath 'Ali Shah Qajar," "Great Britain: British Influence in Persia in the 19th Century," "Historiography: Qajar Period," "Historiography: Pahlavi Period," "Islam in Iran: Messianic Movements," and "Hajji Baba of Ispahan."

Amanat has published numerous journal articles and contributed to volumes of essays. He also edited and co-edited several volumes including most recently with Assef Ashraf, The Persianate World: Rethinking A Shared Space, Leiden and Boston, Brill Publishers, 2018 and with Farzin Vejdani, Iran Facing Others: Identity Boundaries in Historical Perspective New York, Palgrave MacMillan, January 2012.

== Books ==
- Amanat, Abbas (March 1, 1989). Resurrection and Renewal: The Making of the Babi Movement in Iran, 1844–1850. Cornell University Press. ISBN 978-0801420986. (In this study of millenarian movements in Shi'i Iran and Iraq Amanat draws attention to complementary cultural, religious and socioeconomic contexts. He views messianic movements as agents of renewal and indigenous reform often in contrast to the religious establishment and its dry and legalistic interpretation of Islam with a regressive worldview. Utilizing new material, he reexamines the life and time of the founder of the movement, the Bab, and career of the celebrated Babi leader and poet Qurrat al-'Ayn (Taherah) and her contribution to the shaping of the movement.)
- Amanat, Abbas (1997). Pivot of the Universe: Nasir al-Din Shah and the Iranian Monarchy, 1831-1896. University of California Press. ISBN 978-1845118280. (The life and political career of Nasir al-Din Shah Qajar is the material for a case study of tensions within the institution of Persian monarchy and its encounter with forces of modernity. Its Persian translation: Qebleh-e Alam (trans. Hasan Kamshad, Tehran: Nashr Karnameh, 2004) stirred much debate especially with reference to the revisionist treatment of the celebrated premier Mirza Taqi Khan Amir Kabir)
- Amanat, Abbas (March 15, 2009). Apocalyptic Islam and Iranian Shi'ism. I.B. Tauris. ISBN 978-1845119812. (Looking at diverse trends in Iranian Shi'ism and within the broader context of Islamic apocalyptic movements, this book argues how ancient apocalyptic trends reemerged during the Islamic Revolution of 1979 and exploited afterward by the state.)
- Amanat, Abbas; Vahman, Fereydun (August 1, 2016). Az Tehran Ta Akka: Babiyan Va Bahaiyan Dar Asnad Dowran-E Qajar. Ashkaar Publishers. ISBN 9780997676907. (This is a documentary history of the Babi movement in exile and during the birth of the Baháʼí Faith viewed through the lens of Iranian and Ottoman officials.)
- Amanat, Abbas (October 24, 2017). Iran: A Modern History. Yale University Press. ISBN 978-0300112542. This is a critical history of half a millennium of political, socioeconomic and cultural history of Iran from the rise of the Safavid Empire to the 1979 revolution and its aftermath. Since its publication it has been positively reviewed among other places in The Economist, The New York Review of Books, The Wall Street Journal, The Times of London, the Sunday Times, and the Literary Review. Iran took 20 years of work to complete.
- Amanat, Abbas and Assef Ashraf (eds.) (2018). The Persianate World: Rethinking A Shared Space Leiden and Boston: Brill Publishers.

== Publications ==
- The Persianate World: Rethinking A Shared Space (2018)
- Iran: A Modern History (2017)
- From Tehran to Akka: Babis and Bahai's Official Records of Qajar Iran (2016)
- Iran Facing Others: Identity Boundaries in a Historical Perspective (2012)
- Is There a Middle East?: The Evolution of a Geopolitical Concept (2011)
- Apocalyptic Islam and Iranian Shi’ism (2009)
- Shari’a: Islamic Law in the Contemporary Context (2007)
- U.S.-Middle East Historical Encounters: A Critical Survey (2007)
- Imagining the End: Visions of Apocalypse from Ancient Middle East to Modern America (2002)
- Pivot of the Universe: Nasir al-Din Shah and the Iranian Monarchy, 1831-1896 (1997)
- Crowning Anguish: Memoirs of a Persian Princess from the Harem to Modernity (1995)
- Resurrection and Renewal: the Making of the Babi Movement in Iran, 1844-1850 (1989)
- Cities and Trade: Consul Abbot on the Economy and Society of Iran, 1847-1866 (1983)
