= Hamid Enayat =

Iranian Political Scientist

- حمید عنایت
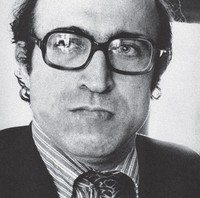
- Born: 1932; Tehran
- Died: 1982 (aged 49–50)

Academic background
- Education: University of Tehran (BA); London School of Economics (MA); University of London (PhD)
- Thesis: The Impact of the West on Arab Nationalism (1962)

Academic work
- Era: Contemporary Politics
- Discipline: Political Science
- Institutions: St. Antony’s College, Oxford; University of Tehran; Khartoum University
- Notable students: Ali Mirsepassi, Farhang Rajaee

Hamid Enayat (Persian: حمید عنایت; 1932 Tehran, Iran - 1982) was an Iranian political scientist and translator.

== Life and works ==
He was born in Tehran to a middle-class family with a background in religious scholarship. He earned his bachelor's degree in political science from Tehran University in 1954. He went on to complete his master's and doctorate in politics at the University of London and London School of Economics, in 1958 and 1962, respectively. In his youth, he was affiliated with the Tudeh party, but after the 1953 coup d’état (q.v.), he joined Khalil Maleki's League of Iranian Socialists (Jāmaʿa-ye sosīālīsthā). In 1960, he co-founded and served as secretary of the Confederation of Iranian Students in Europe, which later led to the formation of the Confederation of Iranian Students, National Union (q.v.). Between 1965 and 1966, he worked as a visiting professor at Khartoum University in Sudan. Upon returning to Iran in 1966, he was appointed associate professor of political science at University of Tehran. In 1980, he became a Lecturer in modern Middle Eastern history and a Fellow of St. Antony’s College, Oxford, a position he held until his death.

== Selected publications ==
=== Books ===
- Enayat, Hamid (1982). Modern Islamic Political Thought. doi:10.1007/978-1-349-16765-4. ISBN 978-0-333-27969-4.

=== Articles ===
- Enayat, Hamid (1974). "State of National Scholarship: The State of Social Sciences in Iran". Middle East Studies Association Bulletin. 8 (3): 1–12. ISSN 0026-3184. JSTOR 23058017.
- Enayat, Hamid (1973). "The Politics of Iranology". Iranian Studies. 6 (1): 2–20. doi:10.1080/00210867308701435. ISSN 0021-0862. JSTOR 4310126.
- Enayat, Hamid (1968). "Islam and Socialism in Egypt". Middle Eastern Studies. 4 (2): 141–172. doi:10.1080/00263206808700097. ISSN 0026-3206. JSTOR 4282240.
