= Savushun =

1969 Persian novel by Simin Daneshvar

Savushun (Persian: سووشون [ʃævuːˈʃuːn]) is a 1969 Persian historical novel by Iranian writer Simin Daneshvar. It is the first novel in Persian written by a female author. The story is about the life of a landowning family in Shiraz faced with the occupation of Iran during World War II. Savushun has sold over five hundred thousand copies in Iran.

Savushun is "groundbreaking" and highly acclaimed work in contemporary Persian literature, with both literary and popular success within and outside Iran. The novel has been translated to English and 16 other languages. When writing about the novel's importance, critic Kaveh Bissari describing an exact translation by M.R. Ghanoonparvar in 1990 and the version A Persian Requiem by Roxane Zand in 1991.

Daneshvar uses folklore and mythology in Savushun. Linguistically, savushun is a corruption of Siyâvashun, which refers to the traditional mourning for Siyâvash, a hero in the Shahnameh.

== Adaptations ==
Simin Daneshvar was particularly sensitive about her novel being adapted, and she generally did not agree to adaptations of this work.

=== Theater ===
Manijeh Mohamedi, a playwright and theater director, managed to obtain permission from Daneshvar to adapt "Suvashun" into a play. The stage production, under the same title, featured actors such as Afsaneh Bayegan (as Zari), Mohammad Eskandari (as Yousef), Mehdi Miami, Mohsen Zehtab, and Habib Dehghan-Nasab. This play was performed in the main hall of Tehran's City Theater from March 2001 to May 2002. The play's script, adapted by Mohamedi, was later published by Ghatreh Publishing in 2007 under the title "Suvashun: Based on the Immortal Novel by Simin Daneshvar."

A radio adaptation of "Suvashun" was also broadcast on Radio Namayesh in 2013, directed and arranged by Nima Mehr.

=== Cinema and television ===
Mohammad Motavasselani, an Iranian director, mentioned that he acquired the rights to adapt "Suvashun" into a film many years ago. He has since negotiated with various directors and producers to bring the project to fruition. However, due to the significant budget and specific requirements needed for the film, no producer has yet committed to investing in the project. A television adaptation of this novel, directed by Narges Abyar, is currently in development. In November 2022, the Cinema of the Revolution and Sacred Defense Association announced that they are producing a film-series adaptation of "Suvashun".

== See also ==
- Tangsir (novel)
