= Mohammad Hanif (Iranian writer) =

Iranian novelist (born 1961)

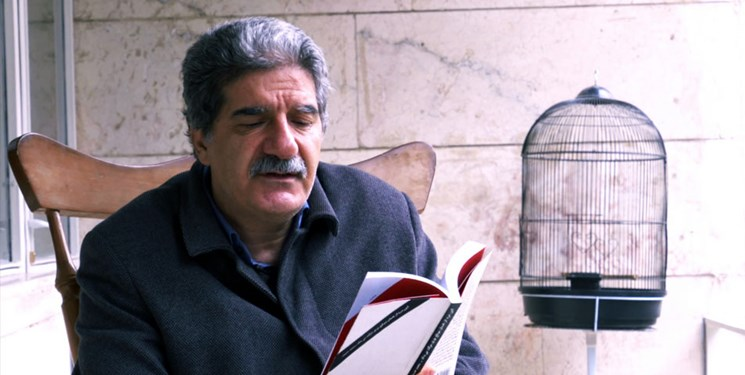
- Mohammad Hanif reading out from one of his novels. (2015)
- Born: 1961 (age 64–65); Boroujerd, Iran
- Education: Kharazmi University
- Known for: Novelist, Literary Critic, and Researcher
- Notable work: With Hard Labor (2019), Localization of Magical Realism in Iran (2016)

Mohammad Hanif (born 1961) is an Iranian novelist and scholar. He is the winner of many national awards including the prestigious Iran's Book of the Year Awards, Jalal Al-e Ahmad Literary Awards, Golden Pen Award.

== Life ==
A few years after the 1979 Revolution, he started his career as a country schoolteacher. However, soon he was fired from his job due to unfounded political charges. Then he entered Kharazmi University to study history, but literature, as well as creative writing, remained a priority for him. His specialty in history encouraged him to write extensively on Persian folklore and also made him one of the few Iranian novelists using magic realism in his novels: an approach particularly evident in his later works, e.g., The Magical Hat and Copper Statue (novel), That Man Smelled Death Since Then (novel), With Hard Labor (novel) and Localization of Magical Realism in Iran (research). He is now mainly focused on fiction.

== Fiction ==
- With Hard Labor (2019)
- Gupta's Magic (2018)
- That Man Smelled Death Since Then (2017)
- The Magical Hat and Copper Statue (2012)
- The Cage: Life in a Prison Camp (2009)
- The Dreams of Deer (2008)
- Icy Flowers (1998)

== See also ==
- Magic Realism
- Iranian Folklore
- Gholam-Hossein Sa'edi
- Moniro Ravanipour
- Gabriel García Márquez
- Louise Erdrich
