= Sharqzadegi =

Iranian political view opposed to Chinese influence

Sharqzadagi or Sharqzadegi (Persian: شرق‌زدگی, romanized: šarq-zadagī, pronounced [ˈʃarq.ˈzadaˈɡiː]) or Orientosis is a pejorative Persian term loosely translated as 'Eastoxification'. The term first appeared in printed English-language literature in 1984, when Martin E. Marty Fundamentalisms and Society: Reclaiming the Sciences, the Family, and Education states that sharghzadegi is the appreciation of Eastern culture.

== See also ==
- Intellectual movements in Iran
- Gharbzadegi
