= Simin Daneshvar =

Iranian writer (1921–2012)

Simin Dāneshvar
- سیمین دانشور
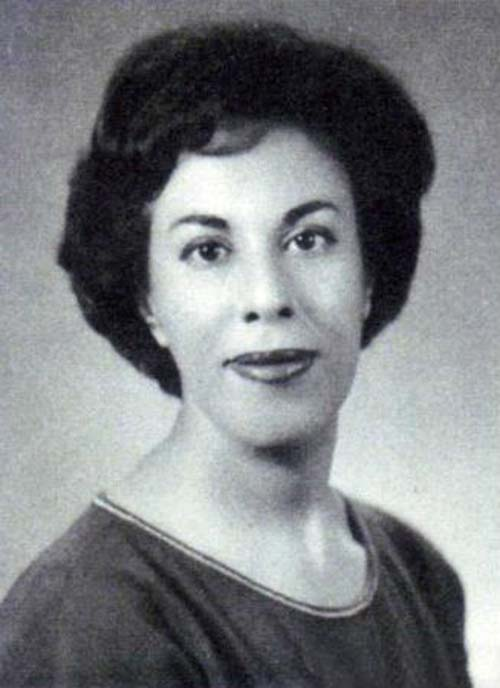
- Born: 28 April 1921; Fasa, Sublime State of Iran
- Died: 8 March 2012 (aged 90); Tehran, Iran
- Resting place: Behesht-e Zahra Cemetery
- Education: University of Tehran; Stanford University
- Occupations: Academic, novelist, fiction writer, literary translator
- Notable work: Savushun (1969)
- Spouse: Jalal Al-e-Ahmad (1950−1969, his death)

Simin Dāneshvar (Persian: سیمین دانشور; 28 April 1921 – 8 March 2012) was an Iranian academic, novelist, fiction writer, and translator.

She was largely regarded as the first major Iranian woman novelist. Her books dealt with the lives of ordinary Iranians, especially those of women, and through the lens of recent political and social events in Iran at the time. Daneshvar had a number of firsts to her credit; in 1948, her collection of Persian short stories was the first by an Iranian woman to be published. The first novel by an Iranian woman was her Savushun ("Mourners of Siyâvash", also known as A Persian Requiem, 1966), which went on to become a bestseller. Daneshvar's Playhouse, a collection of five stories and two autobiographical pieces, is the first volume of translated stories by an Iranian woman author. Being the wife of the famous Iranian writer Jalal al-Ahmad, she had a profound influence on his writing, she wrote the book "the Dawn of Jalal" in memory of her husband. Daneshvar was also a renowned translator, a few of her translations were "The Cherry Orchard" by Anton Chekhov and "The Scarlet Letter" by Nathaniel Hawthorne. Her last book is currently lost and was supposed to be the last book of her trilogy which started with "the lost island". Al-Ahmad and Daneshvar never had a child.

== Early life ==
Simin Daneshvar was born on 28 April 1921 in Shiraz, Qajar Iran. Her father, Mohammad Ali Daneshvar, was a physician. Her mother was a painter. Daneshvar attended the English bilingual school, Mehr Ain and in eighth grade published her first article, "Winter Is Not Unlike Our Life," in a local newspaper. Daneshvar then entered the Persian literature department at the University of Tehran in the fall of 1938. In 1941, her third year of university, her father died, and to support herself she began writing pieces for Radio Tehran as the "Nameless Shirazi". She wrote about cooking and food as well as other things. She also began writing for the foreign affairs section of a newspaper in Tehran, since she could translate from English.

== Literary career ==
Daneshvar started her literary life in 1935, when she was in the eighth grade. In 1948, when she was 27, she published Atash-e khamoosh (Quenched Fire). It was the first collection of short stories published by a woman in Iran, and as such gave her a measure of fame, but in later years Daneshvar refused to republish the work because she was embarrassed by the juvenile quality of the writing. Daneshvar continued studying at the university. Her Ph.D. dissertation, "Beauty as Treated in Persian Literature," was approved in 1949 under the supervision of Professor Badiozzaman Forouzanfar. In 1950, Daneshvar married the well-known Iranian writer Jalal Al-e Ahmad. Simin’s sister (Victoria Daneshvar) said: we have gone to Isfahan and when we have decided to get back to Tehran, there was a man, he asked my sister to sit on his side. So Miss Simin sat next to him. The next morning, I saw my sister who was getting ready to go out. I have decided to go out too. When I opened the door, I saw Mr. Al-Ahmad. They got married on the ninth day of their visit. For the wedding, they invited all of the writers, even Sadegh Hedayat. They rented a house and started living there. In 1952, she traveled to the United States as a Fulbright Fellow working on creative writing at Stanford University with Wallace Stegner. While there, she wrote in English and published two short stories. When she returned to Iran, she joined the faculty at University of Tehran.

She had to translate many books in order to support her household, often was earning more than Jalal. In 1961, she published "Shahri chun behesht" (A city like paradise), twelve years after her first short story collection. In 1963, she attended the Harvard University International Summer Session, a seminar of 40 members from around the world. In 1968, she became the chairwoman of the Iranian Writers Union. In 1969, her novel, Suvashun, was published. Her husband died that same year, in their summer home on the Caspian Sea.

Daneshvar and Al-e-Ahmad were unable to have children, which was a topic of several of his works. Daneshvar continued teaching as an associate professor in the university, later becoming the chair of the Department of Art History and Archaeology, from the 1970s until her retirement in 1981.

== Death ==
Daneshvar was hospitalised in Tehran for acute respiratory problems in 2005. She was released after one month in August 2005. She died at her home in Tehran on 8 March 2012 after a bout with influenza. Her body was buried on 11 March at Behesht-e Zahra.

It had been announced that her body would be buried in Firouzabadi mosque in Ray next to her husband, Jalal Al-e-Ahmad, but this was later denied.

== Works ==
As an author and translator, Daneshvar wrote sensitively about the lives of Iranian women.

Daneshvar's most successful work, Savushun, a novel about settled and tribal life in and around her home-town of Shiraz, was published in 1969. One of the best-selling Persian novels, it has undergone at least sixteen reprints and has been translated into many languages. She also contributed to the periodicals Sokhan and Alefba.

In 1981, she completed a monograph on Jalal Al-e Ahmad, Ghoroub-e Jalal (The sunset of Jalal's days).

Daneshvar's stories reflect reality rather than fantasy. They contain themes such as child theft, adultery, marriage, childbirth, sickness, death, treason, profiteering, illiteracy, ignorance, poverty and loneliness. The issues she deals with are the social problems of the 1960s and 1970s, which have immediacy and credibility for the reader. Her inspiration is drawn from the people around her. In her own words: "Simple people have much to offer. They must be able to give freely and with peace of mind. We, too, in return, must give to them to the best of our abilities. We must, with all our heart, try to help them acquire what they truly deserve."

In Language of Sleep, a biography play which attempts to portray the lives of two great female authors, German-Romanian novelist Herta Muller and herself Simin Daneshvar was written by Mona Ahmadi.

=== Publications/Novels/Books ===
- Savushun, 1969.
  - Sou Va Shoun سووشون (Farsi Edition), 1970.
  - Savushun English translation, 1990.
- Selection [Entekhāb], 2007.
- the trilogy Wandering [Sargardāni]
  - Wandering Island (Island of Wandering) [Jazire-ye Sargardāni], 1992.
  - Wandering Cameleer [Sāreban Sargardān], 2001.
  - Wandering Mountain [Kuh-e Sargardān] (never published, unknown reason)^{*}
  - The Israeli Republic: An Iranian Revolutionary's Journey to the Jewish State, 2017 (Contributing author). ISBN 978-1-632-06139-3
  - Island of Bewilderment: A Novel of Modern Iran (Middle East Literature In Translation), 2022. ISBN 978-0-815-61147-9

=== Short story collections ===
- The Quenched Fire [Atash-e Khamoosh] (1948)
- A City Like Paradise [Shahri Chun Behesht] (1961)
- To Whom Shall I Say Hello? [Be Ki Salaam Konam?] (1980)
- Ask the Migrating Birds (1997)

=== Translations by Daneshvar ===
- Arms and the Man by George Bernard Shaw (1949)
- "Enemies" by Anton Chekhov (1949)
- Beatrice by Arthur Schnitzler (1953)
- The Scarlet Letter by Nathaniel Hawthorne (1954)
- The Human Comedy by William Saroyan (1954)
- Cry, the Beloved Country by Alan Paton (1972)
- The Cherry Orchard by Anton Chekhov (2003)
- Works by Alberto Moravia and Ryūnosuke Akutagawa

=== Translations of Daneshvar's works ===
- In English, Savushun has been translated by M. R. Ghanoonparvar (1990) and, under the title A Persian Requiem, by Roxane Zand (1992). ISBN 978-0-807-61273-6
- Daneshvar's Playhouse, a collection of short stories that includes "The Loss of Jalal", is translated and arranged by Maryam Mafi (1989). ISBN 978-0-934-21119-2
- Sutra and Other Stories (1994). ISBN 978-0-934-21142-0
- Translation into Spanish: El bazar Vakil, Grupo Editorial Norma, Santafé de Bogotá, Colombia, 1992. Work by Hernardo Valencia Goekel, from the English version called Daneshvar's Playhouse (1989).
- Translation into German: Drama der Trauer - Savushun. Glaré Verlag, Frankfurt/Main 1997.
- In India, Savushun is translated into Malayalam by S. A. Qudsi.
- In Norway: "En familie fra Shiraz" translated into Norwegian by N. Zandjani. Gyldendal Norsk forlag. Oslo 2007.
- In Poland: “Dni niepewności” (Persian original: Ruzegar-e agari) and “Z prochu w popiół" (Persian original: Az chak be chakestar) appeared in the anthology Kolacja cyprysu i ognia. Współczesne opowiadania irańskie (Dinner of the Cypress and Fire. Contemporary Iranian Short Stories) which was selected and rendered into Polish by Ivonna Nowicka, Krajowa Agencja Wydawnicza, Warszawa 2003. Both short stories come from the book Az parandegan-e mohajer bepors.
- Also Japanese, Russian, Chinese, and Turkish.

== See also ==
- Forugh Farrokhzad
- Simin Behbahani
- Mina Assadi
- Women in Iran
- List of Iranian women
