= Farhang Rajaee =

Iranian political scientist (born 1952)

Academic background
- Education: University of Virginia (PhD)
- Thesis: Islam and Politics: Ayat-Allah Ruhollah Musavi Khomeyni's Fundamental Political Ideas (1983)
- Doctoral advisor: Kenneth W. Thompson
- Other advisor: Hamid Enayat

Academic work
- Era: Contemporary Politics
- Discipline: Political Science
- Institutions: Carleton University
- Website: carleton.ca/polisci/people/rajaee-farhang/

Farhang Rajaee (Persian: فرهنگ رجایی; born 1952 Arak, Iran) is a professor of political science and humanities at Carleton University. He specializes in political theory and non-Western traditions, particularly modern political thought in Islam.

== Life and works ==
He earned a BA in Political Science from the University of Tehran in 1975, an MA in public administration from the University of Oklahoma in 1977, and a PhD in foreign affairs from the University of Virginia in 1983.

=== Selected publications ===
- Rajaee, Farhang (2010). Islamism and Modernism: The Changing Discourse in Iran. University of Texas Press. ISBN 978-0-292-77436-0.
- Rajaee, Farhang (2000). Globalization on Trial: The Human Condition and the Information Civilization. IDRC. ISBN 978-0-88936-909-2.
- Farhang Rajaee (1993). The Iran-Iraq war : politics of aggression. Internet Archive. Gainesville : University Press of Florida. ISBN 978-0-8130-1176-9.
- Rajaee, Farhang (1983). Islamic values and world view : Khomeyni on man, the state, and international politics. Internet Archive. Lanham, MD : University Press of America. ISBN 978-0-8191-3578-0.

==== Translations ====
- Taleghani, Mahmoud (1983). Islam And Ownership.
- Shariati, Ali (1986). What is to be done : the enlightened thinkers and an Islamic renaissance. Internet Archive. Houston, Tex., U.S.A. : Institute for Research and Islamic Studies. ISBN 978-0-932625-04-5.
