= Jalal Al-e-Ahmad =

Iranian novelist, short-story writer, translator and philosopher

Jalāl Āl-e-Ahmad جلال آل‌احمد
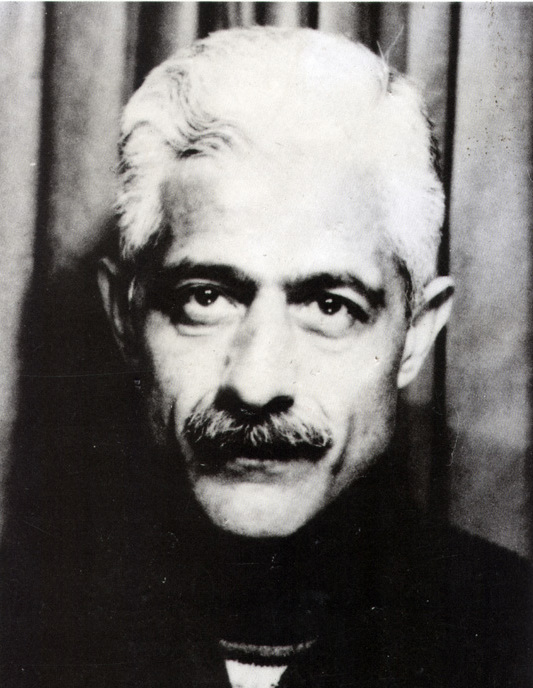
- Born: 2 December 1923; Tehran, Sublime State of Iran
- Died: 9 September 1969 (aged 45); Asalem, Imperial State of Iran
- Education: Tehran Teachers' College (BA); University of Tehran (MA)
- Occupations: Writer, social and political critic
- Political party: Tudeh Party (1945–1948); Third Force (1948–1951); Toilers Party (1951–1952); Third Force (1952–1953)
- Spouse: Simin Daneshvar (1950−1969, his death)

Signature
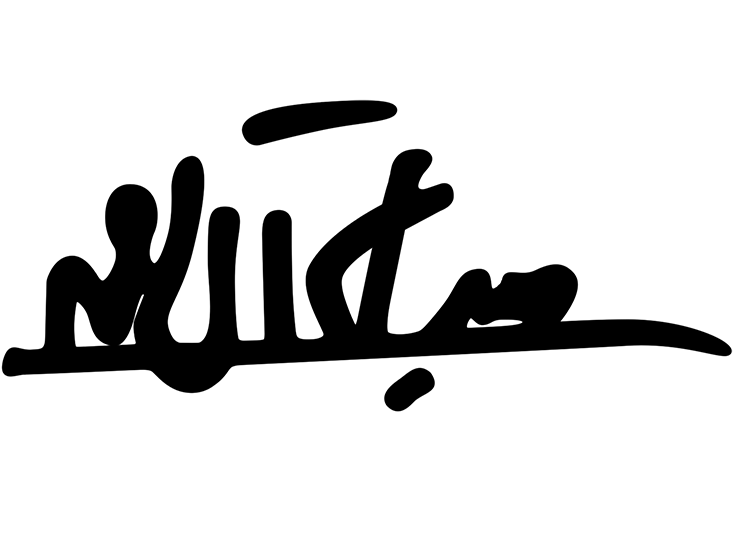

Seyyed Jalāl Āl-e-Ahmad (Persian: جلال آل‌احمد; 2 December 1923 – 9 September 1969) was a prominent Iranian novelist, short-story writer, translator, philosopher, socio-political critic, sociologist, as well as an anthropologist who was "one of the earliest and most prominent of contemporary Iranian ethnographers". He popularized the term gharbzadegi — variously translated in English as "westernstruck", "westoxification", and "Occidentosis" — producing a holistic ideological critique of the West "which combined strong themes of Frantz Fanon and Marx".

== Biography ==
Jalal Al-e-Ahmad was born in Tehran, into a religious family — his father was a cleric — "originally from the village of Aurazan in the Taliqan district bordering Mazandaran in northern Iran, and in due time Al-e-Ahmad was to travel there, exerting himself actively for the welfare of the villagers and devoting to them the first of his anthropological monographs". He was a cousin of Mahmoud Taleghani. After elementary school Al-e-Ahmad was sent to earn a living in the Tehran bazaar, but also attended Marvi Madreseh for a religious education, and without his father's permission, night classes at the Dar ul-Fonun. He went to Seminary of Najaf in 1944 but returned home very quickly. He became "acquainted with the speech and words of Ahmad Kasravi" and was unable to commit to the clerical career his father and brother had hoped he would take, describing it as "a snare in the shape of a cloak and an aba." He describes his family as religious in an autobiographical sketch written in 1967.

In 1946, Al-e-Ahmad earned an M.A. in Persian literature from Tehran Teachers College and became a teacher, at the same time making a sharp break with his religious family that left him "completely on his own resources." He pursued academic studies further and enrolled in a doctoral program of Persian literature at Tehran University but quit before he had defended his dissertation in 1951.

In 1950, he married Simin Daneshvar, a well-known Persian novelist. Jalal and Simin were infertile, a topic that was reflected in some of Jalal's works.

In 1960, before Kharg Island had been transformed into a major oil terminal and shipping port, upon visiting the island, Al-e-Ahmad called it "the orphan pearl of the Persian Gulf".

He died in Asalem, a rural region in the north of Iran, inside a cottage which was built almost entirely by himself. He was buried in the Firouzabadi Mosque in Ray, Iran. According to rumors he was poisoned by SAVAK, but this was vehemently contradicted by his wife, who confirmed the official cause of death, pulmonary embolism due to alcohol and nicotine abuse.

In 2010, the Tehran Cultural Heritage, Tourism, and Handicrafts Department bought the house in which both Jalal Al-e Ahmad and his brother Shams were born and lived.

== Political life ==
=== Gharbzadegi: "Westoxification" ===
We have been unable to preserve our own historicocultural character in the face of the machine and its fateful onslaught. Rather, we have been routed. We have been unable to take a considered stand in the face of this contemporary monster. So long as we do not comprehend the real essence, basis, and philosophy of Western civilization, only aping the West outwardly and formally (by consuming its machines), we shall be like the ass going about in a lion's skin. We know what became of him. Although the one who created the machine now cries out that it is stifling him, we not only fail to repudiate our assuming the garb of machine tenders, we pride ourselves on it. For two hundred years we have resembled the crow mimicking the partridge (always supposing that the West is a partridge and we are a crow). So long as we remain consumers, so long as we have not built the machine, we remain occidentotic. Our dilemma is that once we have built the machine, we will have become mechanotic, just like the West, crying out at the way technology and the machine have stampeded out of control.

— Jalal Al-e Ahmad, Occidentosis: A Plague From the West, Mizan Press (1984), p. 31

Al-e-Ahmad is perhaps most famous for using the term gharbzadegi, originally coined by Ahmad Fardid and variously translated in English as weststruckness, westoxification and occidentosis - in a book by the same name Occidentosis: A Plague from the West, self-published by Al-e Ahmad in Iran in 1962. In the book Al-e-Ahmad developed a "stinging critique of Western technology and by implication of Western 'civilization' itself". He argued that the decline of traditional Iranian industries such as carpet weaving was the beginning of Western "economic and existential victories over the East." His criticism of Western technology and mechanization was influenced, through Ahmad Fardid, by Heidegger, and he also considered Jean-Paul Sartre as another seminal philosophical influence. There was also Ernst Jünger, to whom Jalal ascribes a major part in the genealogy of his famous book, and he goes on to say "Junger and I were both exploring more or less the same subject, but from two viewpoints. We were addressing the same question, but in two languages." Throughout the twelve chapters of the essay, Al-e Ahmad defines gharbzadegi as a contagious disease, lists its initial symptoms and details its etiology, diagnoses local patients, offers a prognosis for patients in other localities, and consults with other specialists to suggest a rather hazy antidote.

His message was embraced by the Ayatollah Khomeini, who wrote in 1971 that

"The poisonous culture of imperialism [is] penetrating to the depths of towns and villages throughout the Muslim world, displacing the culture of the Qur'an, recruiting our youth en masse to the service of foreigners and imperialists..."

and became part of the ideology of the 1979 Iranian Revolution, which emphasized nationalization of industry, independence in all areas of life from both the Soviet and the Western world, and "self-sufficiency" in economics. He was also one of the main influences of Ahmadinejad.

== Discourse of authenticity ==
Ali Mirsepasi believes that Al-e Ahmad is concerned with the discourse of authenticity along with Shariati. According to Mirsepasi, Jalal extended his critiques of the hegemonic power of the West. The critique is centered on the concept of westoxication. Al-e Ahmad attacks secular intellectuals with the concept. He believes that the intellectuals could not construct effectively an authentically Iranian modernity. On this occasion, he posed the concept of “return” to an Islamic culture which is authentic at the same time. Al-e Ahmad believed that to avoid the homogenizing and alienating forces of modernity, it is necessary to return to the roots of Islamic culture. In fact, Al Ahmad wanted to reimagine modernity with Iranian-Islamic tradition.

=== Political activism ===
Al-e-Ahmad joined the communist Tudeh Party along with his mentor Khalil Maleki shortly after World War II. They "were too independent for the party" and resigned in protest over the lack of democracy and the "nakedly pro-Soviet" support for Soviet demands for oil concession and occupation of Iranian Azerbaijan. They formed an alternative party the Socialist Society of the Iranian Masses in January 1948 but disbanded it a few days later when Radio Moscow attacked it, unwilling to publicly oppose "what they considered the world's most progressive nations." Nonetheless, the dissent of Al-e-Ahmad and Maleki marked "the end of the near hegemony of the party over intellectual life."

He later helped found the pro-Mossadegh Tudeh Party, one of the component parties of the National Front, and then in 1952 a new party called the Third Force. Following the 1953 Iranian coup d'état Al-e-Ahmad was imprisoned for several years and "so completely lost faith in party politics" that he signed a letter of repentance published in an Iranian newspaper declaring that he had "resigned from the Third Force, and completely abandoned politics." However, he remained a part of the Third Force political group, attending its meetings, and continuing to follow the political mentorship of Khalil Maleki until their deaths in 1969. In 1963, visited Israel for two weeks, and published 4 essays describing his experiences, which included a visit to Kibbutz Ayelet HaShahar, in which he praised both David Ben-Gurion and Moshe Dayan's visionary leadership as being in the prophetic tradition as "guardians" of the State. He greatly admired the fusion of the religious and secular as bridging both eastern and western culture and saw it as a potential model for the state of Iran. In 5th essay, allegedly written a month after the Six-Day War Ahmad reversed course and wrote a venomous reassessment of Israel replete with antisemitic tropes of Jewish control of banks, the media and Holocaust inversion, though some scholars speculate a different authorship.

Despite his relationship with the secular Third Force group, Al-e-Ahmad became more sympathetic to the need for religious leadership in the transformation of Iranian politics, especially after the rise of Ayatollah Khomeini in 1963.

== Literary career ==
=== Early short stories ===
Al-e Ahmad began publishing fiction in the 1940s. His first published short story, Ziarat (The Pilgrimage), appeared in the literary journal Sokhan in 1945. It was later included in his first collection, Did o Bazdid (The Exchange of Visits), published in the same year.

The collection was followed by Az Ranji ke Mibarim (From Our Suffering) in 1947, Se-tar (The Sitar) in 1948 and Zan-e Ziyadi (The Superfluous Woman) in 1952. These stories often depict ordinary people and their everyday experiences, particularly individuals affected by poverty, social inequality and institutional constraints. Their concise narrative style and use of familiar speech helped establish Al-e Ahmad's distinctive voice in modern Persian fiction.

=== Novels and longer fiction ===
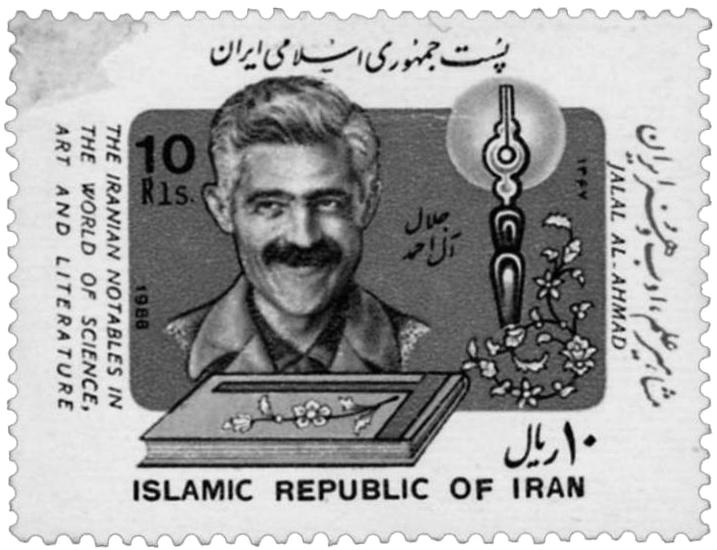
An Iranian postage stamp commemorating Jalal Al-e Ahmad, issued in 1988.

Al-e Ahmad's first major work of longer fiction was Sargozasht-e Kandoha (The Tale of the Beehives), published in 1954. The work uses an allegorical narrative involving bees and honey to comment on contemporary Iranian society and the political conflict surrounding the nationalization of the oil industry. Its symbolic treatment of power and economic dependence reflects the political concerns that also appear in his essays.

His best-known novel, Modir-e Madreseh (The School Principal), was published in 1958. The novel follows a schoolteacher who becomes the principal of a newly established elementary school on the outskirts of Tehran. Through his encounters with teachers, pupils, parents and local officials, the narrator reveals the problems of the educational system and the broader social environment. The work is notable for its first-person narration, colloquial language and critical portrayal of bureaucracy, corruption and institutional indifference. It is widely regarded as one of Al-e Ahmad's most successful works of fiction.

In 1961, he published Nun va'l-Qalam (By the Pen), a historical allegory that uses a setting drawn from the past to explore political authority, social conflict and the history of political movements in Iran. Unlike some of his other works, it adapts elements of traditional Persian storytelling to a modern fictional structure.

His later novel Nefrin-e Zamin (The Cursing of the Land), published in 1967, is closely related to The School Principal. It follows a teacher working in a rural school and examines village life, economic conditions and the relationship between urban intellectuals and rural communities. The work combines fiction with the author's interests in ethnography and social criticism.

=== Literary criticism and essays ===
Alongside fiction, Al-e Ahmad wrote extensively on literature, culture and intellectual life. His essays examined the role of writers in society, the relationship between tradition and modernity, and the cultural responsibilities of intellectuals. His critical writing was often polemical and direct, reflecting his belief that literature and criticism should engage with the social and political conditions of their time.

One of his major critical works was Dar Khedmat va Khianat-e Rowshanfekran (The Services and Disservices of the Intellectuals), written and published in parts during the 1960s. The work examines the historical role of Iranian intellectuals, their relationship with political power and their capacity to contribute to cultural independence. A complete edition was published in 1979.

His other essay collections include Haft Maqaleh (Seven Essays), Se Maqale-ye Digar (Three More Essays) and Arzyabi-ye Shetabzadeh (A Hasty Evaluation).

== Ethnographic studies and travel writing ==
Al-e Ahmad's literary output extended beyond fiction and political essays. He travelled to rural and remote areas of Iran, documenting local customs, dialects, social structures and economic conditions. These studies introduced urban readers to communities and ways of life that were often underrepresented in modern Persian literature.

His first major village study, Owrazan, published in the 1950s, examined the village of Aurazan in the Taleqan region, from which his family originated. The work describes its geography, customs, folklore, dialect and social organization. It reflects his interest in the relationship between local culture and the wider transformations taking place in Iranian society.

In Tat-neshinha-ye Boluk-e Zahra (The Tat People of Block-e Zahra), published in 1958, he documented the language, customs and social life of the Tat communities in the Buin-Zahra region. The study is an important example of his interest in local cultures and the preservation of regional traditions.

In 1960, he published Dorr-e Yatim-e Khalij-e Fars (The Orphan Pearl of the Persian Gulf), a study of Kharg Island. The work records observations about the island, its inhabitants and its economic and social conditions before its later transformation into a major oil-export terminal.

His travel writing includes Khassi dar Miqat (A Straw in the Miqat), published in 1966, based on his experience of the Hajj pilgrimage in 1964. He also wrote accounts of journeys to the Soviet Union, Europe, the United States and Israel. Some of these travel writings remained unpublished in complete form during his lifetime, while portions appeared separately or were collected posthumously.

== Visit to Israel ==
In early 1963, Al-e Ahmad travelled to Israel and visited several locations, including the kibbutz of Ayelet HaShahar. His observations were later published posthumously in a travelogue commonly known as Safar be Velayat-e E'zra'il (Journey to the Province of Israel or Journey to the Land of Israel). The account records his impressions of Israeli society, political institutions and the relationship between religion and national identity.

His views on Israel and Zionism changed over time. The travelogue reflects an initial mixture of curiosity, interest and ambivalence, while later writings became more critical. Scholars have situated this shift within the political and intellectual debates of the 1960s, including the aftermath of the 1953 coup in Iran, changing anti-colonial movements and the Six-Day War.

== Translations ==
Al-e Ahmad translated several works of European literature into Persian, particularly from French. His translations included works by Albert Camus, Fyodor Dostoevsky, André Gide, Jean-Paul Sartre, Eugène Ionesco and Ernst Jünger.

His translations included:

- The Stranger by Albert Camus, translated as Biganeh.
- The Misunderstanding by Albert Camus, translated as Su-e Tafahom.
- The Gambler by Fyodor Dostoevsky, translated as Qomar-baz.
- The Fruits of the Earth by André Gide, translated as Ma'edeha-ye Zamini (with P. Daryush).
- Return from the U.S.S.R. by André Gide, translated as Bazgasht az Shoravi.
- Dirty Hands by Jean-Paul Sartre, translated as Dast-haye Aludeh.
- Rhinoceros by Eugène Ionesco, translated as Kargadan.
- Über die Linie by Ernst Jünger, translated as Obur az Khatt (with M. Human).

His translations introduced Persian readers to major works of modern European literature and reflected his engagement with contemporary philosophical and literary debates.

== Literary style and influence ==
Al-e Ahmad developed a distinctive prose style characterized by concise sentences, colloquial expressions, direct narration and a critical tone. His language often reflects the rhythms of everyday Persian speech, while drawing on the expressive resources of classical Persian prose. His fiction frequently uses first-person narration, autobiographical elements and episodes taken from ordinary social life.

His stories and novels often examine the relationship between individuals and institutions, including schools, political organizations, religious authorities and local communities. Rather than focusing primarily on elaborate psychological description, many of his narratives develop through incidents, dialogue and the narrator's observations of social behaviour. This approach is especially evident in The School Principal and The Cursing of the Land.

Al-e Ahmad was also influenced by modern European writers, including Albert Camus, Jean-Paul Sartre and Louis-Ferdinand Céline. At the same time, he remained engaged with classical Persian literature and traditional narrative forms. His fiction and essays combine these influences with an interest in the social realities of contemporary Iran.

His ethnographic studies expanded the range of subjects represented in modern Persian prose by bringing rural communities, regional dialects and local customs into literary and intellectual discussion. His work as a teacher, editor and critic also helped shape literary debates among younger Iranian writers.

He was an important supporter of the modern Persian poet Nima Yushij and contributed to the acceptance of Nima's innovations in modern Persian poetry. Al-e Ahmad's essays and public interventions helped establish a broader discussion about literary modernism, cultural independence and the social responsibility of writers.

== Death ==
Al-e Ahmad died on 9 September 1969 in Asalem, in northern Iran, aged 45. He had been staying in a rural cottage that he had helped build. His sudden death gave rise to speculation that he had been poisoned by SAVAK, the intelligence and security organization of the Pahlavi government. His wife, Simin Daneshvar, rejected the poisoning allegation and supported the reported medical explanation of his death. The circumstances have remained the subject of discussion, but the poisoning claim has not been established as fact by conclusive evidence.

He was buried at the Firouzabadi Mosque in Ray, Iran. His death at the age of 45 ended a literary career that had produced fiction, essays, translations, travel accounts and ethnographic studies over approximately twenty-four years.

== Legacy ==
Al-e Ahmad remains a significant figure in modern Iranian intellectual and literary history. His works have been widely discussed for their treatment of cultural identity, modernization, political authority, religion and the position of intellectuals in society. Gharbzadegi in particular became a major reference point in debates about Western influence and cultural independence in Iran, although its arguments have been interpreted and criticized in different ways.

His literary works, especially The School Principal, By the Pen and The Cursing of the Land, continue to be studied as examples of modern Persian fiction. His travel writing and village studies are also considered important records of Iranian social and cultural life during the mid-20th century.

=== Jalal Al-e Ahmad Literary Award ===
The Jalal Al-e Ahmad Literary Award is an Iranian literary prize established in his name. It was approved by the Supreme Council of the Cultural Revolution in 2005, and the first awards were presented in 2008. The award recognizes works in categories including novels, short stories, literary criticism and historical research. It is one of the major state-sponsored literary awards in Iran.

== Selected works ==
The following list includes major books by Al-e Ahmad. Publication dates refer to the original Persian editions unless otherwise stated.

=== Short-story collections ===
- Did o Bazdid (The Exchange of Visits, 1945)
- Az Ranji ke Mibarim (From Our Suffering, 1947)
- Se-tar (The Sitar, 1948)
- Zan-e Ziyadi (The Superfluous Woman, 1952)
- Panj Dastan (Five Stories, published posthumously, 1974)

=== Novels and novellas ===
- Sargozašt-e Kandoha (The Tale of the Beehives, 1954)
- Modir-e Madreseh (The School Principal, 1958)
- Nun va'l-Qalam (By the Pen, 1961)
- Nefrin-e Zamin (The Cursing of the Land, 1967)
- Sangi bar Guri (A Stone upon a Grave, written before his death; published posthumously)

=== Essays and critical works ===
- Haft Maqaleh (Seven Essays, 1955)
- Se Maqale-ye Digar (Three More Essays, 1960)
- Gharbzadegi (Weststruckness or Occidentosis, 1962)
- Arzyabi-ye Shetabzadeh (A Hasty Evaluation, 1964)
- Dar Khedmat va Khianat-e Rowshanfekran (The Services and Disservices of the Intellectuals, published in parts during 1964–1968; complete edition 1979)
- Karnameh-ye Se Saleh (Three Years' Record, 1968)
- Israel, Agent of Imperialism (Persian publication, 1978)

=== Ethnographic studies and monographs ===
- Owrazan (Aurazan, 1956)
- Tat-neshinha-ye Boluk-e Zahra (The Tat People of Block-e Zahra, 1958)
- Dorr-e Yatim-e Khalij-e Fars (The Orphan Pearl of the Persian Gulf, 1960)

=== Travel writing ===
- Khassi dar Miqat (A Straw in the Miqat, 1966)
- Chahar Kaba (Four Kaabas), a collection of travel accounts including journeys to the Soviet Union, the United States, Europe and Israel; published in collected form after his death.

=== Translations ===
- Albert Camus, The Stranger (Persian translation: Biganeh)
- Albert Camus, The Misunderstanding (Persian translation: Su-e Tafahom)
- Fyodor Dostoevsky, The Gambler (Persian translation: Qomar-baz)
- André Gide, The Fruits of the Earth (Persian translation: Ma'edeha-ye Zamini)
- André Gide, Return from the U.S.S.R. (Persian translation: Bazgasht az Shoravi)
- Jean-Paul Sartre, Dirty Hands (Persian translation: Dast-haye Aludeh)
- Eugène Ionesco, Rhinoceros (Persian translation: Kargadan)
- Ernst Jünger, Über die Linie (Persian translation: Obur az Khatt)

== See also ==
- Persian literature
- Modern Persian literature
- Gharbzadegi
- Iranian Writers' Association
- Simin Daneshvar
- Nima Yushij
