= Contemporary Politics =

- Discipline: Political science, Sociology
- Language: English

Publication details
- History: 1995-present
- Publisher: Taylor & Francis
- Frequency: Quarterly
- Impact factor: 1.421 (2019)

Standard abbreviations
- ISO 4: Contemp. Politics

Indexing
- ISSN: 1356-9775 (print); 1469-3631 (web)
- OCLC no.: 869666473

Links
- Journal homepage; Online archive

Contemporary Politics is a quarterly peer-reviewed academic journal in the discipline of political science, and is published by Taylor & Francis. According to the Journal Citation Reports, the journal has a 2019 impact factor of 1.421.

== Abstracting and indexing ==
Contemporary Politics is abstracted and indexed in:

- International Political Science Abstracts
- Sociological Abstracts
