= Ali Mirsepassi =

Iranian-American sociologist and political science

- Born: October 27, 1950

Academic background
- Education: University of Tehran (BA); American University (MA, PhD)
- Thesis: The Historical and Structural Development of Labor Politics in Modern Iran (1985)
- Doctoral advisor: Samih Farsoun, Jurg Siegenthaler, Ken Kusterer
- Other advisor: Hamid Enayat

Academic work
- Discipline: Intellectual History, Sociology
- Institutions: New York University

Ali Mirsepassi (born 1950) is an Iranian-American sociologist and political scientist and the Albert Gallatin Research Excellence Professor of Middle Eastern and Islamic studies at New York University.

== Books ==
- Mirsepassi, Ali; Fernée, Tadd Graham (2024). The Intellectual Thought of Al-Ghazālī. The Global Middle East. Cambridge: Cambridge University Press. doi:10.1017/9781009538114. ISBN 978-1-009-53816-9.
- Mirsepassi, Ali (2023). The Loneliest Revolution: A Memoir of Solidarity and Struggle in Iran. Edinburgh Historical Studies of Iran and the Persian World. Edinburgh University Press. ISBN 978-1-3995-1141-4.
- Mirsepassi, Ali (2021). The Discovery of Iran: Taghi Arani, a Radical Cosmopolitan. Stanford University Press. ISBN 978-1-5036-2914-1.
- Mirsepassi, Ali (2019). Iran's Quiet Revolution: The Downfall of the Pahlavi State. The Global Middle East. Cambridge: Cambridge University Press. doi:10.1017/9781108641852. ISBN 978-1-108-48589-0.
- Mirsepassi, Ali (2018). Iran's Troubled Modernity: Debating Ahmad Fardid's Legacy. The Global Middle East. Cambridge: Cambridge University Press. doi:10.1017/9781108566124. ISBN 978-1-108-47639-3.
- Mirsepassi, Ali (2017). Transnationalism in Iranian Political Thought: The Life and Times of Ahmad Fardid. The Global Middle East. Cambridge: Cambridge University Press. doi:10.1017/9781316941195. ISBN 978-1-107-18729-0.
- Mirsepassi, Ali; Fernée, Tadd Graham (2014). Islam, Democracy, and Cosmopolitanism: At Home and in the World. Cambridge: Cambridge University Press. doi:10.1017/cbo9781107284296. ISBN 978-1-107-05397-7.
- Mirsepassi, Ali (2010). Democracy in Modern Iran: Islam, Culture, and Political Change. New York University Press. doi:10.18574/nyu/9780814795644.001.0001. ISBN 978-0-8147-6439-8.
- Mirsepassi, Ali (2010). Political Islam, Iran, and the Enlightenment: Philosophies of Hope and Despair. Cambridge: Cambridge University Press. doi:10.1017/cbo9780511975127. ISBN 978-0-521-76882-5.
- Mirsepassi, Ali (2000). Intellectual Discourse and the Politics of Modernization: Negotiating Modernity in Iran. Cambridge Cultural Social Studies. Cambridge: Cambridge University Press. doi:10.1017/cbo9780511489242. ISBN 978-0-521-65000-7.

=== Editorials ===
- Keshavarzian, Arang; Mirsepassi, Ali, eds. (2021). Global 1979: Geographies and Histories of the Iranian Revolution. The Global Middle East. Cambridge: Cambridge University Press. doi:10.1017/9781108979658. ISBN 978-1-108-83907-5.
