= Gharbzadegi =

Iranian political view of Western culture as toxic

Gharbzadagi or Gharbzadegi (Persian: غرب‌زدگی, romanized: ġarb-zadagī, pronounced [ɢærb.zæ.de.gíː]) or Occidentosis is a Persian-origin term translated among other ways as 'Westoxification' or 'West-struck-ness'. The concept describes an unquestioned imitation by Eastern cultures of Western appearance, behaviour (particularly consumerism and materialism), modes of reasoning and expression with an insufficient intellectual understanding thereof. This would lead the ruling classes to reason and behave in ways inconsistent with their environment, and to apply Western solutions to Eastern problems.

The term implies both that Iran is "intoxicated" (زده -zada) with the West, but also a victim of the West's "toxins" or disease. The "intoxication or infatuation... impairs rational judgment" so that Iran is prevented from perceiving the danger of the object of its infatuation — the toxins of the West — "moral laxity, social injustice, secularism, devaluation of religion, and obsession with money, all of which are fueled by capitalism" and result in "cultural alienation." The term is used to refer to the loss of Iranian cultural identity through the adoption and imitation of Western models and Western criteria in education, the arts, and culture; through the transformation of Iran into a passive market for Western goods and a pawn in Western geopolitics.

The phrase was first coined in the 1940s by Ahmad Fardid, a professor of philosophy at the University of Tehran, to refer to the hegemony of ancient Greek philosophy — a different meaning from that later popularised by Jalal Al-e-Ahmad. It gained common usage following the clandestine publication in 1962 of the book Occidentosis: A Plague from the West by Jalal Al-e-Ahmad.

== Different translations to English ==
- "Westoxication", is by far the predominant translation in English references. It was used by Brad Hanson who found other renderings of gharbzadegi to be too literal. Hanson assumed Al-e Ahmad was "playing on the word senzadegi, the affliction of wheat by an aphid-like pest quite common in Iran". Hanson argued that it seeks to convey both intoxication (the infatuation with the West) and infection (Westernization as the poisoning of an indigenous culture). Mehrzad Boroujerdi added, "it most closely resembles Al-e Ahmad's usage of gharbzadegi as a medical metaphor denoting a social illness".
- "Disease of Westernism"; Peter Avery used this term to refer to the topic of Al-e Ahmad's essay in 1965.
- "Occidentalization"; Al-e Ahmad himself reportedly equated gharbzadegi with this term.
- "Weststruckness"; in the early 1970s, Michael Craig Hillmann used this term.
- "Weststrucktedness"; in the late 1970s, Paul Sprachman considered this term archaic and "West-strickenness" as cacophonic and stylistically problematic.
- "Westities"; Edward Mortimer used this term in Faith and Power, attempting to render gharbzadegi while preserving the various ideas encapsulated in Persian. It was also used in Sprachman's translation to distinguish between the noun (gharbzadegi) and the essay's title ("Plagued by the West"), a term which is often included in German references as well (Geplagt vom Westen).
- "Occidentosis"; this appears in the title of Robert Campbell's English translation and L'occidentalité in the French.
- "Xenomania"; Hamid Algar opts for this term in his notes to the translation of Ayatollah Khomeini's government.
- "Westomania" is preferred by Reza Baraheni in The Crowned Cannibals, and was also chosen by Farzaneh Milani in Veils and Words.
- "Euromania"; Roy Mottahedeh used this term in The Mantle of the Prophet.

== Al-e Ahmed's idea ==
Al-e Ahmed describes Iranian behavior in the twentieth century as being "Weststruck." The word was play on the dual meaning of "stricken" in Persian, which meant to be afflicted with a disease or to be stung by an insect, or to be infatuated and bedazzled.

"I say that gharbzadegi is like cholera [or] frostbite. But no. It's at least as bad as sawflies in the wheat fields. Have you ever seen how they infest wheat? From within. There's a healthy skin in places, but it's only a skin, just like the shell of a cicada on a tree."

Al-e Ahmad argued that Iran must gain control over machines and become a producer rather than a consumer, even though once having overcome Weststruckness it will face a new malady — also western — that of 'machinestruckness'.

"The soul of this devil 'the machine' [must be] bottled up and brought out at our disposal ... [The Iranian people] must not be at the service of machines, trapped by them, since the machine is a means not an end."

The higher productivity of the foreign machines had devastated Iran's native handicrafts and turned Iran into an unproductive consumption economy. "These cities are just flea markets hawking European manufactured goods ... [In] no time at all instead of cities and villages we'll have heaps of dilapidated machines all over the country, all of them exactly like American 'junkyards' and every one as big as Tehran."

The world market and global divide between rich and poor created by the machine — "one the constructors" of machines "and the other the consumers" — had superseded Marxist class analysis.

Al-e Ahmad believed intellectuals were unable to construct an authentically Iranian modernity, and that the one element of Iranian life uninfected by gharbzadegi was religion. Twelver Shia Islam in Iran had authenticity and the ability to move people, so to eliminate the homogenizing and alienating forces of Western modernity it was necessary to "return" to authentic culture.

=== Western popular culture ===
"Gharbzadegi" is the title of a political song by British avant-garde musician Robert Wyatt, which appears on Old Rottenhat (Rough Trade, 1985) and can also be heard on the tribute LP Soupsongs Live: The Music of Robert Wyatt.

== See also ==
- Sharqzadegi
- Intellectual movements in Iran
- Jahiliyyah
- Westernizer
- Tehran American School

== Bibliography ==
- Al-e Ahmad, Jalal. Occidentosis: A Plague from the West (Gharbzadegi), translated by R. Campbell. Berkeley, CA: Mizan Press, 1983.
- Al-e Ahmad, Jalal. Plagued by the West (Gharbzadegi), translated by Paul Sprachman, Columbia University, NY; Delmar, NY:: Caravan Books, 1982.
- Al-e Ahmad, Jalal. Weststruckness (Gharbzadegi), translated by John Green and Ahmad Alizadeh. Costa Mesa, CA: Mazda Publishers, 1997.
- Hanson, Brad (29 January 2009). "The "Westoxication" of Iran: Depictions and Reactions of Behrangi, Āl-e Ahmad, and Shari ati". International Journal of Middle East Studies. 15 (1): 1–23. doi:10.1017/s0020743800052387. S2CID 162995598.
