= Religious intellectualism in Iran =

Religious intellectualism in Iran (Persian: روشنفکری دينی) is a process that involves philosophers, sociologists, political scientists and cultural theorists.

== Summary ==
The unifying traits of these intellectuals include their recognition of reform in the Islamic thought, democracy, civil society and religious pluralism and their opposition to the absolute supremacy of the Faqih. The rise of religious intellectuals can be followed through the writings of Abdolkarim Soroush. Soroush’s main idea is that there are perennial unchanging religious truths, but our understanding of them remains contingent on our knowledge in the fields of science and philosophy.

Influenced by Persian mysticism, religious intellectuals advocated a type of reformist Islam that went beyond most liberal Muslim thinkers of the 20th century and argued that the search for reconciliation of Islam and democracy was not a matter of simply finding appropriate phrases in the Qur'an that were in agreement with modern science, democracy, or human rights. Drawing on the works of Molana Jalaleddin Balkhi, Immanuel Kant, G.W.F. Hegel, Karl Popper, and Erich Fromm, Iranian intellectuals called for a reexamination of all tenets of Islam, insisting on the need to maintain the religion's original spirit of social justice and its emphasis on caring for other people.

Iranian religious intellectuals criticize both tradition and modernity. They believe that modernity has an essential hardcore (that includes e.g. critical wisdom) and some non-essential associates. Therefore, it is possible to define what they call "Iranian modernity" which is not necessarily incompatible with religion.

== E'tezalieh movement ==
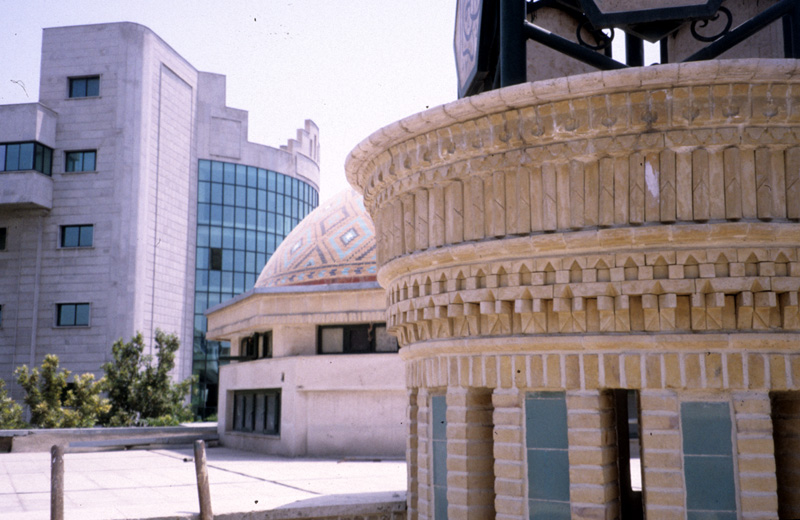
One of Tehran's major hospitals is named after Ali Shariati (located in Amir abad district.

The glorious period of religious intellectual achievements was due to a well-known early school of thought known as "Mo'tazeleh". This school of thought flourished during the early Abbasid era. They adopted the method of applying rationality in the process of making interpretations of code of religion.

Two centuries after the death of the Prophet there were two distinct schools of Islamic speculative theology, the Motazelites who in the 8th century were the first Muslims to apply Greek philosophy to Islamic doctrine, and the Asharites, the "nominalists of Islam", followers of the 10th century orthodox theologian al-Ashari. Acknowledging the absolute oneness of God, the Motazelites reasoned therefore that the Koran could not legitimately be thought the co-eternal word of God, which was the orthodox view, but was rather created. There was place therefore for a realm of truth and morality not derived from religion, a rationality or secularity not simply given in the Kuran.

Iranian religious intellectuals, in the tradition of the Motazelites, proceed from a rationality not confined to religion, a free and independent thought which is thoroughly modern in its assertions as distinct from its presuppositions.

== History of religious intellectualism in Iran ==
The history of Iranian religious intellectualism dates back to 19th century. Contrary to widespread opinion, Mohammad Kazem Khorasani (1839–1911) reasoned that absolute guardianship belongs to God, and absolute human authority (including the prophet) should be rejected. Khorasani categorizes people's affairs into two areas:

- Public domain, matters which people refer to their chiefs or governments, as political issues or public domain or uncertain issues.
- Private issues, i.e. particular issues relating to individuals. In this area some religious Judgments (Ahkam) such as ownership, marriage and inheritance have been laid down by the religion. To Khorasani, observing these canonical judgments is obligatory on all, even the Prophet or the Imams.

Khorasani's ideas differed from the foremost theologians of his time, for example Mirza Hossein Na'eeni who was also very influential in the course of Persian Constitutional Revolution.

In brief, Khorasani firstly considers judgment as a specific right for jurisprudents; secondly, he does not regard legislation as an obligation for jurisprudents, but their supervision over legislation as necessary, so that no law enters a religious society against the religion; and thirdly, he denies specific right for jurisprudents to manage the public domain. Absolute rejection of jurisprudents' specific right to manage the public domain makes it possible for all people to participate. On this basis, Khorasani announces his historical saying: "In Imam Mahdi's occultation, government belongs to the public". This statement is seen by Iranian scholars as the foundation of democracy in an Islamic society.

The history of Iranian religious intellectualism in the 20th century can be divided into two stages, as follows.

=== Phase I: The ideological discourse ===
- Prototype of scholars: Ali Shariati (1933–1977)

Shariati thought that modernization might be consistent with traditional religious values. He also disassociated religion from the monopoly of the clerics. Not surprisingly, once in power, the Islamic Republic tried to counter his teachings. Nevertheless, his ideas have continued to have strong resonance within Iranian society.

According to Ali Rahnema: "Shariati was a man of his times. He reflected the mood, conditions, problems, pains and conceivable solutions of his times . . . He does not fit into any classical stereotype. Those who try to portray him as such, simply deform the man."

Shariati was a critic of both tradition and modernity. After several decades of his death, he is still the most influential Iranian religious intellectual inside and outside of Iran.

=== Phase II: Epistemologial/Democratic discourse ===
- Prototype of scholars: Abdolkarim Soroush

Regarding the socio-political role of religion, the epistemological discourse has "minimalist" expectations. "Rationalism", Soroush states, "is one of the most sturdy elements of epistemological discourse," especially as it promotes democratic methods of governance. Further, the collective intellect of society should decide its administration, not a preplanned religious platform that is, in reality, the cumulative understanding of the fuqaha. The rhetoric of this democratic discourse is noncombative and emphasizes the personal "rights" of "citizens" and calls for the institutionalization of civil liberties. Therefore, people’s participation in politics should be based on their political rights and free will as citizens of the state, and not on the basis of their ideological/religious duties as subjects. The philosophy of Abdolkarim Soroush can be summarized as follows:

- Distinction between "religion" and our "understanding of religion".
- Distinction between "essential" and "accidental" aspects of religion.
- Distinction between "minimalist" and "maximalist" interpretation of Islam.
- Distinction between values and morals that are considered internal in respect to Islam and those that are external.
- Distinction between Religious "belief" and Religious "Iman".
- Distinction between religion as an ideology/identity and religion of truth.

Here is a sketchy comparison of several newly developed Iranian theologies:

- Soroush theology: Variable nature of religious knowledge
- Kadivar theology: Plural nature of religious knowledge
- Shabestari theology: Limited nature of religious knowledge

It is also helpful to compare these modern theologies with the theology developed by Mehdi Bazargan several years earlier:

- Bazargan theology:

Bazargan's main contribution to modern Iranian theology is the following: The main mission of prophets was to inform people about God and the next life. It was not the prophets’ mission to teach people how to manage society, or what kind of government to have. That is to say, it is not necessary for Muslims to refer to the Quran in order to discover laws for politics, economics and society, or theories of mathematics or natural sciences, and so on. To discover these laws, Muslims, like non-Muslims, must refer to collective reason; that is, to rely on achievements in the fields of science and philosophy.

== Iranian intellectual Islam and modernity ==
Characteristics of "Intellectual Islam" as defined by Iranian scholars or "the principles of compatibility of Islam and Modernity" can be mentioned as follows:

- First Principle: Comparing with the Official Islam which had been "Formalist", the Intellectual Islam is "Teleological", and believes that all religious precepts, holy rites and propositions are in the service of a lofty goal.
- Second principle: In intellectual Islam this statement “The goal of no religious precept could not be understood by human reason” is not right.
- Third principle: The intellectual Moslems say that without respecting the individuality and freedom of choice human dignity cannot be respected.
- Fourth principle: The intellectual religious are distinguished from La’ic (non-religious) intellectuals at least in three cases:
  - First, religious people including religious intellectuals (Moslem, Christian or Jewish) are living faithfully in their private lives, believe in God and in the other world, and follow religious styles in their moralities and are people of prayer, following God and religious rites.
  - Secondly, the religious intellectuals are bound to religious morality in public domain and in interaction with the others. What is more important, is their practical adherence to religious criteria.
  - Thirdly, the religious people and the believers try to observe human dignity, justice and morality in public policy making.

== Secularization of religion ==
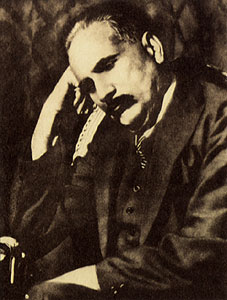
Iqbal had significant influence on Iranian intellectualism.

Abdolkarim Soroush believed that secularism is not fundamental to modernity and it is the Western case of modernity that is secular. According to Soroush secularism can be in two domains: in the mind and in social institutions. A secular mind cannot possibly be religious. However, it is possible to reconcile secular institutions with a religious society. He also put forward the idea of "minimal secularization".

Saeed Hajjarian allegedly showed the supremacy of politics as such over any religious norm when he said that the survival of the Islamic Republic was paramount and that no religious ritual should stand in its way. This kind of decision, he states, means that politics are more important than religion and that this acknowledges the secularization of religion. In this context, he argues, it is possible to reassess velayat faqih and to reject its supremacy within the political field in Iran.

In brief, Iranian religious intellectuals distinguish various kinds of secularism:

- political secularism
- philosophical secularism
- social secularism

They only accept "political secularism" and reject the two others. According to Iranian scholars, political secularism has two major pillars. One pillar is the question of legitimacy and the other consists of the political system’s neutrality towards religious and theoretical schools. They have argued that the system’s legitimacy hinges on justice, not on any particular type of religion, and the acceptance of the system comes from the people.

== Religious pluralism and Rumi philosophy ==
Pluralism was introduced by Abdolkarim Soroush to contemporary Iranian philosophy. He got the original idea from Rumi, the Persian poet and philosopher. Soroush's ideas on religious pluralism has been inspired by the English philosopher of religion John Hick. In light of his Kantian influences, Soroush claims that knowledge of transcendent reality can only be known as it is being perceived.

As John Hick put it, pluralism is the belief that no one religion has a monopoly of the truth or of the life that leads to salvation. In the poetic words of the great Sufi, Rumi, speaking of the religions of the world, "The lamps are different but the Light is the same; it comes from beyond" (Rumi: Poet and Mystic, trans. R.A. Nicholson, London and Boston: Unwin, p. 166).

Rumi, very respectfully makes frequent references to Greek philosophers of different schools of thought including the atomists. In many of his poems, he resembles God to sunlight which is reflected in the prism of human thought as different religious orders. This allegory is probably the best illustration of pantheism which regards God as One and at the same time believes in His multiple representations in the world (this sounds like panentheism). Although pantheism was not a thoroughgoing pluralism, its advocacy of a pluralistic notion of God's representation, gave rise to a pluralistic tendency in religious and philosophical thought of the Mediaeval Times in the Islamic world, and pantheism even influenced prominent thinkers of Modern Times such as Leibniz and Spinoza.

== Tolerance and Iranian religious intellectualism ==
Hafiz, an Iranian poet of the eighth/fourteenth century, championed tolerance. He wrote: "In these two expressions lies peace in this world and the next / With friends, magnanimity; with enemies, tolerance". Hafez knew well that, in a religious society, inviting people to exercise tolerance would fail to have any impact or captivate hearts unless it was accompanied by an insightful theory of human nature and religion. This is why he astutely tried throughout his works to use the language of poetry and allusion to elucidate a theory of this kind and to persuade his audience that his recommendation was not just a case of well-intentioned sermonizing but that magnanimity and tolerance were sound philosophical notions that rested on solid foundations.

Hafez even drew on the troubling notion of determinism (predestination, fatalism) to reinforce his tolerance-inclined thinking. He says, we are all prisoners of destiny; a Muslim person is Muslim by virtue of geography and history, just as a Christian is a Christian on the same grounds.

One century earlier, Rumi stated that we each hold a portion of the truth in our hands and no one has all of it. This admission of the deficiency of knowledge is enough to make us more humble, and patience and tolerance are nothing other than one of the fruits of the tree of humility.

Iranian religious intellectuals borrowed the concept of "tolerance" from these Persian thinkers and developed it further.

== Democracy, religion, and Iranian philosophy ==
Democracy is one of the propositions that many religious people are afraid of approaching. According to the philosopher of religions Abdolkarim Soroush we do not have one democracy from ancient Greece to today, but many of them, hence there is a plurality of democracies in the international community. Democracy prevailed in different eras depending on the conditions of the time. What alters the hue and color of democracy is a society’s specific characteristics and elements.

Democracy can be secular or religious. But what occurs is coincidence, and not unity. Relativistic liberalism and democracy are not identical. On the other hand, democracy is not violated when a faith is embraced, it is violated when a particular belief is imposed or disbelief is punished.

Religious democracy means that the values of religion play a role in the public arena in a society populated by religious people. Religious democracy is an example of how democratic values can exist in a different cultural elaboration than what is usually known before. But, in a secular society, some other characteristics are important and focused on, and that becomes the basis for democracy.

Two major idea against the religious democracy could be recognized:

From the secularism point of view, the ideals of a democratic society and a secular state are unified. Therefore, the firm separation of religion and state is insisted in such a way that implies that without this separation there can be no freedom from tyranny. Absolute sovereignty of the people dominates this idea. Religion should be put aside from the scene in order to establish democracy and freedom.

From the legalism point of view, democracy can never enjoy a general acceptance in a religious society. Anything outside of the rigid, but pervasive, interpretation of the religious texts is rejected and the absolute sovereignty of God prevails such that there is no role for the sovereignty of people. The less freedom a society enjoys, the stronger religion will be.

== Some particular problems ==
There are many issues about Islam that have been the origin of human rights concerns over the last few decades. Many of such problems have been solved (in theory) almost hundred years ago by Iranian philosophers of religion and many of such problems are now "considered history" in Iranian academic circles. Such questions however have been a matter of concern among traditional theologians. Here is a list of some such problems that have been solved by traditional theologians:

- Apostasy:
  - Solved by religious intellectuals hundred years ago.
  - Solved by traditional humanists Ahmad Ghabel and Hossein Ali Montazeri.
  - Solved in some specific cases by fundamentalists: Ali Khamenei and Mahmoud Hashemi Shahroudi in the case of Hashem Aghajari.
- Stoning:
  - Solved by traditional humanists: Allameh Tabatabaei
  - Solved by fundamentalists: Mahmoud Hashemi Shahroudi (As the Head of Judiciary, he ordered a ban on the practice of stoning in December 2002.)
- Suicide bombing:
  - Solved by traditional humanists: Yousef Sanei and Ahmad Ghabel
- Blood money:
  - Solved by traditional humanists: Yousef Sanei
- Hijab:
  - Solved by traditional humanists: Ahmad Ghabel, Hassan Yousefi Eshkevari, Mahmoud Taleghani and Hossein Ali Montazeri
- Clerical administration and theocracy:
  - Solved by traditional humanists: Ahmad Ghabel
- Trans sexuality:
  - Solved by Ruhollah Khomeini and Mehdi Karimi Nia.

Ideological issues like Jihad do not have any place in modern Iranian theology since the end of the ideological discourse (phase 1). However some issues like homosexuality, prostitutions and promiscuity are still under investigation in the context of Iranian theology. The current view among religious intellectuals is that the act of homosexuality is "simply immoral". However no one conducted a solid research on the issue in Iran up to now. The current understanding about the nature of homosexuality among such scholars seems to be similar to European psychologists' view before 1885.

== Criticism ==
This movement and its ideas have been criticized from different viewpoints. On one hand some intellectuals and academicians like Javad Tabatabaei have criticized using religious as the attribute of intellectualism. On the other hand, some others like Seyyed Hossein Nasr have criticized them because of merging Islam with modernism. Furthermore, theologians like Morteza Motahhari, Javadi Amoli and Mesbah Yazdi have criticized them because of diversion from Shia and Islamic theology.

== Notable figures ==
- Akhound Khorasani
- Allameh Na'ini
- Mahmoud Taleghani
- Yadollah Sahabi
- Mehdi Bazargan
- Ali Shariati
- Morteza Motahhari
- Mohammad Mojtahed Shabestari
- Abdolkarim Soroush
- Mohsen Kadivar
- Saeed Hajjarian
- Alireza Alavitabar
- Mahmoud Sadri
- Ahmad Zeidabadi
- Hashem Aghajari
- Yousef Sanei
- Hossein-Ali Montazeri
- Mostafa Mohaqqeq Damad
- Mohammad Khatami
- Hassan Yousefi Eshkevari
- Abdol Ali Bazargan
- Ezzatollah Sahabi
- Arash Naraghi

== References and further reading ==
- Ashk Dahlén, Islamic Law, Epistemology and Modernity: Legal Philosophy in Contemporary Iran, New York: Routledge (2003).
- Ashk Dahlén, Sirat al-mustaqim: One or Many? Religious Pluralism Among Muslim Intellectuals in Iran, The Blackwell Companion to Contemporary Islamic Thought, ed. I. Abu-Rabi, Oxford (2006).
- Farideh Farhi, Religious Intellectuals, the "Woman Question," and the Struggle for the Creation of a Democratic Public Sphere in Iran, International Journal of Politics, Culture, and Society. Volume 15, Number 2 / December, 2001
- Forough Jahanbakhsh, Islam, Democracy. and Religious Modernism in Iran: From Bazargan. to Soroush, Leiden: Brill (2001)
- Forough Jahanbakhsh, The Emergence and Development of Religious Intellectualism in Iran, Historical Reflections, Vol.30, No.3, Fall 2004, pp. 469–490.
- Farhad Khosrokhavar, The New Intellectuals in Iran Social Compass, Vol. 51, No. 2, 191–202 (2004)
- Mirsepassi, Ali. Religious Intellectuals and Western Critiques of Secular Modernity, Comparative Studies of South Asia, Africa and the Middle East – Volume 26, Number 3, 2006, pp. 416–433
- Mahmoud Sadri, Sacral Defense of Secularism: The Political Theologies of Soroush, Shabestari, and Kadivar. International Journal of Politics, Culture and Society, Vol. 15, No. 2, Winter 2001.
- Ahmad Sadri and Mahmoud Sadri Reason, Freedom, and Democracy in Islam: Essential Writings of Abdolkarim Soroush. OXFORD University press. ISBN 0-19-515820-2
- Mohammad Mojtahed Shabestari, The Secular Nature of Law in Islam: A Basis for Democracy. Global Dialogue, No. 6 (1/2) (2004).

== See also ==
- Intellectual movements in Iran
- Institute for Interreligious Dialogue
- Liberalism in Iran
- Clericalism in Iran
- Islamic Principlism in Iran
- Religious traditionalism in Iran (Iranian traditional humanism)
- Modernism (Roman Catholicism)
- Liberal Christianity
- Humanism
- Islam and modernity
- Middle East and globalization
- Anti-intellectualism
- Age of Enlightenment
- Secularism in the Middle East
- Irreligion in the Middle East

Scholars:

- John Hick
- Javed Ahmad Ghamidi
- John Esposito
- Hamid Dabashi
- Mohammed Arkoun

== Notes ==
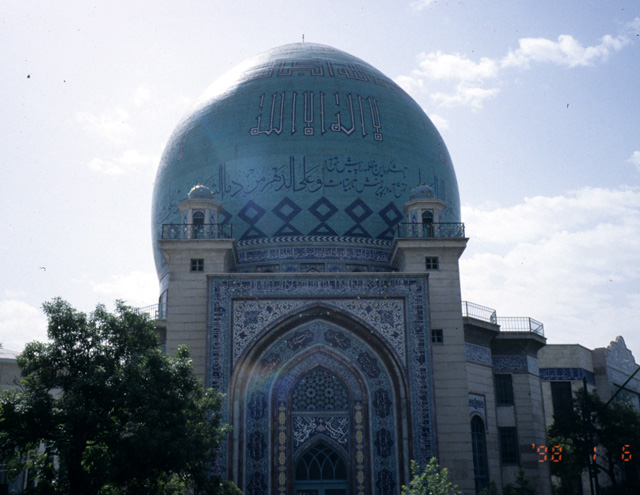
Hoseiniyeh Ershad, where Ali Shariati used to hold many of his speeches.
