= Intellectual movements in Iran =

Intellectual movements in Iran concern the development of modern intellectual thought in Iran, particularly since the nineteenth century. Iranian intellectuals became increasingly engaged with political and social reform, Iran's relationship with the modern West, and questions of nationalism, identity, religion, and modernity.

These movements were mediated through education, translations, the press, travel, and new institutions such as Dar al-Funun. These debates contributed to major developments in Iranian political and cultural life, including the Constitutional Revolution and later debates over nationalism, Islam, democracy, and the nature of modernity.

== History of Iranian modernity ==
Iranian intellectual engagement with modernity developed particularly through the country's encounter with European political, intellectual, and scientific ideas from the nineteenth century onward. Iranian intellectuals debated how European institutions and ideas could be adapted to Iranian society while preserving or redefining Iranian cultural and religious traditions. Intellectuals differed over which reforms were necessary: some emphasized constitutional government and the rule of law, others modern education and science, while others advocated more radical changes to religious, cultural, and political institutions.

Some twenty-five hundred years ago, when Herodotus was writing his Histories, Persia was the West's ultimate other. The encounter with European modernity became a central theme of Iranian intellectual thought in the nineteenth and twentieth centuries.

Iranian intellectuals also drew on Iran's pre-Islamic and Islamic heritage when considering modernity and national identity. References to figures such as Cyrus the Great and Zoroaster became particularly significant in modern discussions of Iranian history and identity.

== Generations of Iranian intellectuals ==
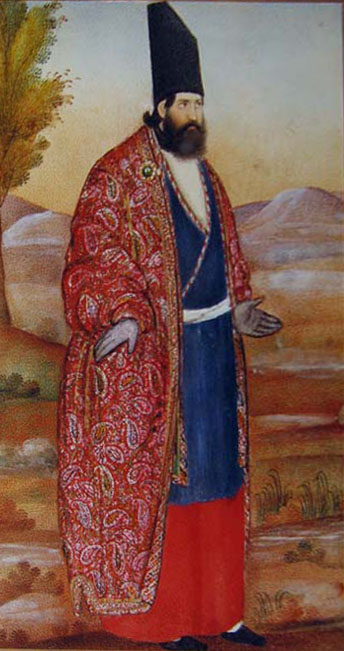
Portrait of Iranian prime minister, Amir Kabir by Sani ol molk.

=== First generation ===
The first generation of modern Iranian intellectuals emerged during the nineteenth century, as reformers responded to Iran's encounter with European political, scientific, and cultural developments. They criticized aspects of existing political, educational, and social institutions and advocated different forms of reform, including modern education, the adoption of European sciences, and changes to political and legal institutions. Among the prominent intellectuals associated with this movement were Mirza Abdul'Rahim Talibov Tabrizi and Fath-'Ali Akhoundzadeh.

=== Second generation ===
A second generation of Iranian intellectuals and writers emerged in the late nineteenth and early twentieth centuries, engaging more extensively with European political thought, literature, science, and institutions. This milieu included figures such as Mohammad-Taqi Bahar, Ali Dashti, Mohammad-Ali Foroughi, Sadeq Hedayat, Bozorg Alavi, Ahmad Kasravi, Saeed Nafisi, and Hasan Taqizadeh. Some of these figures also participated directly in political and administrative reform, including Ali Akbar Davar and Abdolhossein Teymourtash.

=== Third generation ===
The third generation of Iranian intellectuals emerged amid the growing influence of Marxism and other radical political ideologies on Iranian political and social thought. Iranian intellectuals engaged with Marxist ideas through both European and Soviet sources, while developing broader critiques of capitalism, imperialism, the state, and established social institutions. This generation increasingly viewed intellectual activity as a means of social and political criticism, with intellectuals assuming prominent roles in debates over morality, culture, social justice, and political change. Jalal Al-e-Ahmad and Ali Shariati were among the prominent intellectuals associated with this generation.

=== Fourth generation ===
A fourth generation of Iranian intellectuals emerged in the late 1980s and 1990s, associated with intellectual journals such as Goftegu and Kiyan. In contrast with earlier ideological approaches, these intellectuals increasingly questioned comprehensive ideological systems and emphasized critical inquiry, pluralism, and new approaches to the relationship between Islam, democracy, and modernity. Abdolkarim Soroush was one of the most prominent figures associated with this intellectual current.

== Modern art movement ==
Iranian modern art developed through an interaction between Iranian artistic traditions and international modernist trends. From the mid-twentieth century onward, Iranian artists increasingly experimented with modernist forms while engaging with questions of Iranian identity and cultural heritage. Iranian cinema also became an important medium for exploring questions of modernity, society, and cultural identity. The Iranian New Wave, particularly the work of directors such as Abbas Kiarostami, gained international recognition for its distinctive aesthetic and philosophical approach. Modern visual art likewise developed through attempts to combine Iranian artistic traditions with modern forms and techniques.

== Modern and contemporary architecture movement ==
Modern Iranian architecture developed particularly from the early twentieth century, as Iranian architects increasingly engaged with international modernist architecture while also responding to Iran's architectural heritage and cultural traditions. The establishment of modern educational institutions, particularly the Faculty of Fine Arts at the University of Tehran, contributed to the development of modern architectural practice and education in Iran.

Architects associated with the development of Iranian modernism included Vartan Hovanessian, Mohsen Foroughi, Heydar Ghiai, Abdolaziz Farmanfarmaian, and Hooshang Seyhoun. Their work incorporated international modernist principles while addressing the changing needs of Iranian society and the country's architectural context.

From the 1960s onward, Iranian architects increasingly explored ways of relating modern architectural forms to Iranian historical, cultural, and environmental contexts. Nader Ardalan and Kamran Diba, among others, developed approaches that sought to reconcile modern architecture with Iranian traditions and cultural identity. Following the 1979 Iranian Revolution, Iranian architects continued to engage with international architectural developments, including postmodernism and later theoretical approaches. Abbas Gharib and Bahram Shirdel are among the architects associated with these later developments.

== Music movement ==
Modern Iranian music developed alongside broader social and cultural changes during the late nineteenth and twentieth centuries. The introduction of Western musical forms and institutions contributed to changes in Iranian musical education and performance, while musicians and composers sought to develop new approaches to Persian music. The Tehran Symphony Orchestra, established in 1933, became an important institution for the performance of Western classical and Iranian symphonic music.

Following the 1979 Iranian Revolution, Persian classical music continued to develop through ensembles, composers, and performers working within and beyond Iran. Groups such as the Aref Ensemble and, later, Masters of Persian Music, contributed to the performance and international dissemination of Persian classical music. Iranian composers and performers also continued to explore combinations of Iranian musical traditions with Western instruments, orchestration, and compositional techniques.

Folk musicians such as Sima Bina contributed to the preservation and dissemination of regional Iranian musical traditions, including music from Khorasan, Kurdistan, southern Iran, and Mazandaran.

== Literature and poetry ==
Modern Persian literature developed alongside the broader intellectual and social changes of the nineteenth and twentieth centuries. Writers and poets increasingly experimented with new literary forms and genres while addressing contemporary social, political, and cultural questions. The Constitutional Revolution of 1905–1911 in particular contributed to the expansion of literary expression and the emergence of new forms of political and social criticism in Persian literature. Among the influential modern literary and intellectual figures were Sadeq Hedayat, Ahmad Kasravi, Abdolhossein Zarrinkoub, Shahrokh Meskoob, Ebrahim Golestan, and Sadegh Choubak.

== Drama ==
The introduction and translation of European plays in nineteenth-century Iran contributed to the emergence of modern Iranian theatre. European theatre, with its written texts and more formalized acting practices, was introduced into Iran in the late nineteenth century and became part of the country's broader modernization process. Playwrights including Mirza Fatali Akhundov contributed to this development through works that circulated in Persian. Twentieth-century Iranian drama subsequently developed through playwrights such as Bahram Beyzai and Akbar Radi, who became prominent figures in modern Iranian theatre.

== Modern science in Iran ==
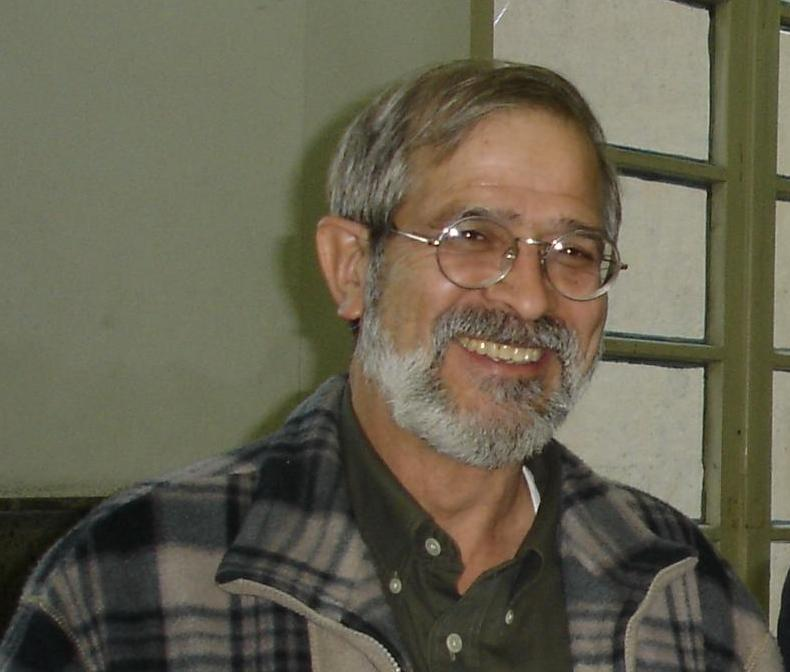
Mohammad-Nabi Sarbolouki, an influential figure in science policy making, prominent scientist and one of the pioneers of biotechnology and biomaterial research in IranMehrdad, Morteza; Heydari, Akbar; Sarbolouki, Mohammad Nabi; Etemad, Shapour (2004). "Basic science in the Islamic Republic of Iran". Scientometrics. 61 (1): 79–80. doi:10.1023/B:SCIE.0000037364.65282.4d.

The development of modern science in Iran accelerated in the nineteenth century with the establishment of institutions such as Darolfonoon in 1851 and the dispatch of Iranian students to Europe. These initiatives contributed to the introduction of modern scientific education and European scientific knowledge into Iran.

The establishment of the University of Tehran in 1934 marked another important stage in the institutional development of modern science in Iran. Iranian universities subsequently expanded scientific education and research across a range of disciplines.

One of the main Iranian scientific movements in the late 20th century was in the field of chemistry and pharmaceutical chemistry. The main leaders of this movement were Abbas Shafiee, Bijan Farzami, Mohammad-Nabi Sarbolouki, Issa Yavari and Ahmad Reza Dehpour. The movement resulted in hundreds of research papers in peer-reviewed international journals.

In 2007, the United Nations awarded Hossein Malek-Afzali the United Nations Population Award. Malek-Afzali helped design strategies to improve health procedures, particularly in adolescent health, reproductive health and family planning. In the field of reproductive health, he helped engage policymakers and religious leaders in the design and implementation of reproductive health programmes in Iran.

== Iranian women's movement ==
Currently women's rights groups are among the most active social rights groups in Iran and are mostly involved in an effort to gain equal rights for women in the Iranian legal system by opposing specific discriminatory laws. However, under the Presidential regime of Mahmoud Ahmadinejad, elected president in 2005, women's rights advocates have been beaten, jailed and persecuted.

Women have played an important role in Iranian intellectual and cultural life, including in literature, cinema, science, and political and social activism. Women's participation in these fields expanded significantly during the twentieth century.

Women also became prominent in Iranian cinema, literature, and visual arts, Some these women included Shirin Neshat, Tahmineh Milani, Rakhshan Bani-Etemad, and Samira Makhmalbaf. Bibi Khatoon Astarabadi was an important female writer and activist associated with the Constitutional period.

== Historical landmarks ==
=== Persian constitutional revolution ===
The Constitutional Revolution of 1905–1911 was a major turning point in modern Iranian history. The constitutional movement drew on ideas of liberalism, representative government, social justice and civil rights, and led to the establishment of the National Consultative Assembly. Writers and journalists such as Mirza Jahangir Khan Shirazi and Farrokhi Yazdi became prominent voices of the constitutionalist movement and its associated calls for political reform, freedom and social change.

=== 28 Mordad coup ===
In the 1953 Iranian coup d'état, known in Iran as the 28 Mordad coup, the Prime Minister of Iran Mohammad Mosaddegh was overthrown on 19 August 1953. The coup d'état was orchestrated by the United Kingdom (under the name Operation Boot) and the United States (under the name TPAJAX Project).

Mossadegh had sought to reduce the semi-absolute role of the Shah granted by the Constitution of 1906, thus making Iran a full democracy, and to nationalize the Iranian oil industry, consisting of vast oil reserves and the Abadan Refinery, both owned by the Anglo-Iranian Oil Company, a British corporation (now BP). A military government under General Fazlollah Zahedi was formed which allowed Mohammad-Rezā Shāh Pahlavi, the Shah of Iran (Persian for an Iranian king), to effectively rule the country as an absolute monarch according to the constitution. The Shah subsequently consolidated his political authority and ruled Iran until his own overthrow in February 1979.

Declassified documents later provided substantial evidence of British and U.S. involvement in planning and supporting the 1953 coup. The CIA is quoted acknowledging the coup was carried out "under CIA direction" and "as an act of U.S. foreign policy, conceived and approved at the highest levels of government."

=== Iranian Revolution ===
Scholars have offered different interpretations of the Iranian Revolution, including explanations emphasizing the interaction of modernity, Islamic identity, political opposition, and Iran's historical experience.

=== 2nd of Khordad movement ===
The election of Mohammad Khatami in 1997 marked the rise of a reform movement that emphasized political participation, civil society, and greater openness. Reformist intellectuals and political activists debated the relationship between democracy, Islam, and the institutions of the Islamic Republic. Saeed Hajjarian was an important strategist and theorist associated with the reform movement. He argued for reconsidering the relationship between religion and politics and for reforming the political institutions of the Islamic Republic. He later argued that the reform project had its roots in the Constitutional Revolution and remained incomplete.

The 2nd of Khordad movement encompassed a broader political and intellectual current than Khatami's presidential reform program. The reformist camp was heterogeneous, with differences over the nature, extent, and strategy of political reform within the Islamic Republic.

=== Campaigns against intellectuals ===
The post-revolutionary Cultural Revolution transformed Iran's universities and academic institutions, closing universities and resulting in the dismissal of thousands of professors and instructors. The early 1980s also saw widespread repression of political opponents, including arrests and executions. In the 1990s, the Chain murders of Iran involved the killing of a number of dissidents, writers, journalists, and intellectuals.

== Intellectual circles in late 20th century ==
Intellectual circles in postrevolutionary Iran can be classified into the following categories:

=== Revolutionary intellectual circles ===
Revolutionary intellectuals included thinkers who criticized aspects of the Pahlavi order and developed alternative political, social, and cultural ideas. Ali Shariati, Jalal Al-e Ahmad, and Morteza Motahhari were among the influential thinkers associated with intellectual currents that contributed to the ideological environment preceding the 1979 Revolution.

=== Reformist intellectual circles ===
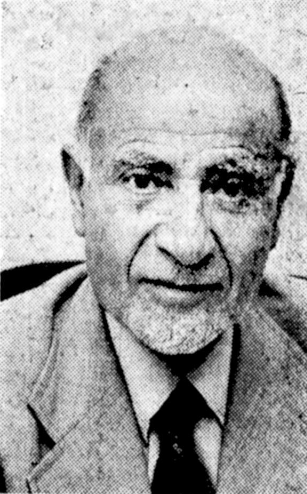
Iranian scholar Mehdi Bazargan was an advocate of democracy and civil rights. He also opposed the cultural revolution and US embassy takeover.

Reformist religious intellectuals sought to reinterpret Islamic thought in response to modern political, philosophical, and social ideas. Figures associated with this current included Mehdi Bazargan, Abdolkarim Soroush, Mohammad Mojtahed Shabestari, Mostafa Malekian, Mohsen Kadivar, and Alireza Alavitabar. While these thinkers differed in their positions, many addressed questions concerning democracy, civil society, religious pluralism, and the relationship between Islam and political authority.

Abdolkarim Soroush became particularly influential for his argument that religious knowledge is historically and intellectually conditioned, while religious belief itself should be distinguished from human interpretations of religion. He also explored the possibility of reconciling Islam with democracy.

=== Democratic religious circles (In-system reformers) ===
A related current consisted of religious reformers who sought political and institutional reform within the framework of the Islamic Republic. Figures associated with this current included Mohammad Khatami, Abdollah Nouri, Yousef Sanei, Mir-Hossein Mousavi, and Mostafa Moin. Their positions varied, but the reformist movement generally advocated greater political participation, the rule of law, civil society, and greater political and social freedoms.

=== Neo-conservative intellectual circles ===
Conservative and neo-conservative intellectual currents developed in opposition to many of the ideas associated with the reform movement. Thinkers associated with these currents included Reza Davari Ardakani, Javad Larijani, and Mehdi Golshani. Some emphasized criticism of Western models of modernity and democracy and defended an Islamic conception of political and cultural order. Davari drew extensively on Heidegger's critique of modernity and developed a sustained criticism of Western models of modernity and their application to Iran.

=== Non-religious intellectual circles ===
Non-religious intellectuals in contemporary Iran have approached modernity, secularism, Iranian identity, political thought, and the relationship between Iran and the West from diverse perspectives. Figures associated with different strands of this intellectual milieu include Javad Tabatabaei, Dariush Shayegan, Amir Hossein Aryanpour, Ramin Jahanbegloo, Ehsan Naraghi, Khosro Naghed, Abbas Milani, and Aramesh Doustdar.

Dariush Shayegan examined the tensions between Iranian cultural traditions and modernity, later emphasizing the fragmented and plural nature of contemporary cultural identities. He criticized unitary conceptions of cultural identity and argued for greater openness to cultural plurality.

=== Traditional scholars ===
Another important current was associated with traditionalist thinkers such as Hossein Nasr, who criticized modernity from a religious and metaphysical perspective. Nasr argued that modern civilization had marginalized or weakened the sacred and sought an alternative grounded in traditional Islamic thought, metaphysics, and sacred knowledge.

== Philosophy in contemporary Iran ==
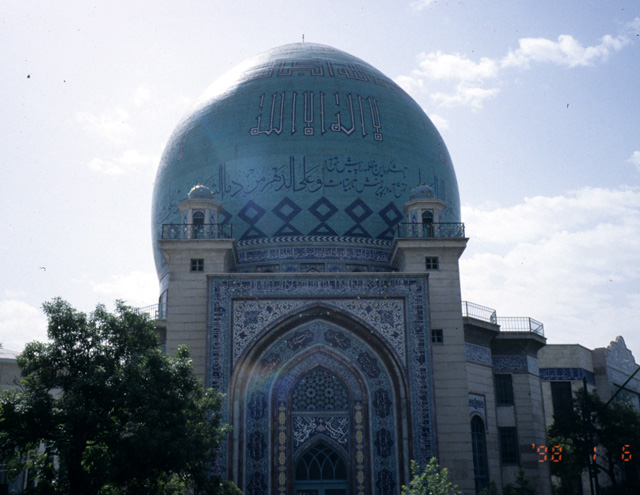
Hoseiniyeh Ershad, where Ali Shariati used to hold many of his speeches.

Philosophy has played an important role in modern Iranian intellectual life. Contemporary Iranian philosophical discourse includes several overlapping traditions, including Islamic philosophy, engagement with Western philosophy, and debates concerning modernity, secularism, religion, and political thought.

Western philosophy was introduced to Iranian intellectual circles through translations, education, and engagement with European philosophical thought. During the twentieth century, Iranian philosophers and intellectuals engaged with a range of Western traditions, including Marxism, phenomenology, existentialism, Heideggerian thought, and later analytical philosophy.

Ahmad Fardid was an influential figure in the reception of Heideggerian philosophy in Iran, while figures such as Reza Davari Ardakani and Dariush Shayegan developed their own interpretations of Heidegger and of modernity and Western thought.

Analytical philosophy also found a place in Iranian intellectual and academic life, although its reception was more limited and uneven than that of continental philosophy. Iranian philosophers engaged with analytic approaches in areas including philosophy of science, ethics, political philosophy, philosophy of language, and philosophy of mind. Among those associated with this engagement were Abdolkarim Soroush, Hamid Vahid Dastgerdi, and Mahmoud Khatami.

== See also ==
- History of philosophy
- History of ideas
- Intellectual history
- Iranian modern and contemporary art
- Iranian philosophy
- Isfahan School
- Persian literature
- Religious intellectualism in Iran
- Science and technology in Iran
