= Irreligion in the Middle East =

Lack of religion in the Middle East

Irreligion in the Middle East is the lack of religion in the Middle East. Though atheists in the Middle East are rarely public about their lack of belief, as they are persecuted in many countries where they are classified as terrorists, there are some atheist organizations in the Middle East. Islam dominates public and private life in most Middle Eastern countries. Nonetheless, there reside small numbers of irreligious individuals within those countries who often face serious formal and, in some cases, informal legal and social consequences.

In terms of atheism and apostasy, while the Quran condemns the practice, it does not explicitly criminalize or pronounce a hadd (a specific criminal punishment) for apostasy. Muslim scholars have traditionally believed that it should be penalized with execution as per the hadiths on the matter but many scholars today argue that this punishment should not be implemented as it related to treason in the past and does not anymore.

Middle Eastern nations with some form of Sharia law in court punish non-believers in varying ways, however, many non-Muslims and even some Muslims argue that these punishments are barbaric and inhumane.

== Background ==
In the World Values Survey conducted from 2010 to 2014, results show that in Yemen, Jordan, and Iraq, fewer than 0.5% of those surveyed self-defined themselves as atheists; meanwhile, the highest percentage of self-defined atheists within the Middle East was in Kuwait, at 0.8%. Despite the relatively low number of publicly atheist individuals in the Middle East, some media platforms have claimed that the Middle East is witnessing a new rise of outspoken secular and irreligious citizens. In a BBC News article that highlights a recent Arab Barometer survey on Middle East and North African citizens, Egypt was shown to have a comparatively significant increase in the proportion of people who say they are not actively religious from 2013 to 2019.

Some of these citizens who come from a state with severe punishments for atheists, like the death penalty, have reported living in fear.

Regardless, transparent data on how many citizens in the Middle East are atheists, apostates, or of other form of irreligious identity have been challenging for researchers to discover. In one report by the Immigration and Refugee Board of Canada, atheists residing in Kurdish region of Iraq also have difficulties expressing their disbelief publicly—despite the Kurdish government generally considered to be secular.

== Rise of the "New Atheists" ==
One of the rising form of non-religious sectors within the Middle East have been labeled as the new atheists. This organization essentially retaliates against religious institutions by claiming they are violent and unnecessary, though some argue that they are mostly criticizing the Islamic faith and community. The new atheism popularly rose from the U.S. following the 9/11 attacks and widespread coverage on Islamic extremists, and it found a number of followers within the Middle East.

Ismail Mohammed, from Egypt, is a new atheist who utilizes social media platforms to vocalize atheism. An Egyptian newspaper Al-Sabah claimed 3 million of Egypt's 84 million population have no religion, citing an unnamed US survey but no such survey exists. However, the exact number of apostates or atheists in Egypt has not been accurately measured, and the validity of this estimate has not been proven.

== Persecution of non-believers ==
Like other non-Muslims, atheists suffer persecution in the Middle East. 88 percent of Muslims in Egypt reportedly approve of the death penalty for those who leave Islam. In one report by the International Humanists, in Article 121 of Iranian law, homosexuality is punishable up to death for a non-Muslim subject, while the Muslim active party is punished through 100 lashes.

Though persecution of blasphemous atheists are often carried out by law in the Middle East, some states like Turkey and Lebanon do allow atheists to live rather safely though withstanding any promise of legal form of safety.

Meanwhile, some scholars have been opposing the death penalty for apostasy in the Islamic realm. Writers Abdullah Saeed and Hassan Saeed published a book claiming the history and fundamentals of Islam support freedom of religion, and that since the Quran does not explicitly state to punish apostasy with death it is unethical to support capital punishment for non-religious individuals. And although the Quran does not state exactly how apostasy should be punished, it has historically been debated among the Islamic communities. Scholars Rudolph Peters and Gret J.J. De Vries document that some, like the Hanafite lawyers, did argue that under the penal law an Imam should execute the apostate by a sword; meanwhile women and children have been seen as uniformly by the community as the exceptions to execution.

== Prevalence ==
Though still uncommon, public acknowledgement of atheism is widely considered to be growing in the Middle East. Though data on how prevalent atheism is can be difficult to measure where social desirability bias may obscure survey answers, there have been attempts to record potential trends. Youth in the Persian Gulf countries have increasingly been expressing their atheism on the Internet in recent years, despite residing in heavily religious societies. The Web and the Internet have been a popular tool where more than 50 atheist Facebook groups and pages, some with more than 8,000 followers, have formed especially since the Arab spring.

== Relevant data ==
In a 2012 Global Religious based survey conducted by Gallup showed the percentage of people who identify as religious, with the highest being 96, Iraq came in at 88 and Saudi Arabia at 75. Meanwhile, the Global Atheism Index for the same year shows the percent of self-identified atheist in Iraq at 0 and in Saudi Arabia at 5. In comparison, the Global Distribution of self-identified atheist was at 13 percent.

In another aspect of BBC News' survey conducted by Arab Barometer in 2013, which was shortly after the Arab Spring, Lebanese citizens have significantly declined in religious beliefs. According to a summary by Arab Weekly, the survey indicates that less than 25 percent of Lebanese identify as religious, but it is not clear how many are atheists.

A 2020 Online Survey by Gamaan found a much larger percentage of Iranians identifying as atheist (8.8%), Zoroastrian (8%), a large fraction (22.2%) identifying as not following an organized religion and only 40% self-identifying as Muslims.

In 2010, a Pew Research study found that in Jordan and Egypt, where 58 percent and 74 percent respectively believe that Sharia law should be imposed on both Muslim and non-Muslim citizens of their nation, had a high number of people who believe in the death penalty for those who abandon their Islamic faith. The study found 86 percent of Egyptians, 82 percent of Jordanians, as well as 66 percent from Palestinian Territory surveyed citizens who support sharia law also support capital punishment for apostates; also 46 percent Lebanese and 42 percent Iraqis agreed to the capital punishment.

== List of notable non-religious Middle Eastern people ==
- Ali Al Bukhaiti Yemeni politician, journalist, and writer.
- Husayn Muruwwa Lebanese communist and ex-ayatollah.
- Armin Navabi Ex-Muslim atheist and secular activist, author, podcaster and vlogger including founder of Atheist Republic
- Ashraf Dehghani Iranian female communist revolutionaries, and is a member of the Iranian People's Fedai Guerrillas
- Aous Shakra Palestinian philosopher and politician
- Aramesh Dustdar Philosopher, writer, scholar and a former philosophy lecturer at Tehran University
- Afshin Ellian Iranian-Dutch professor of law, philosopher, poet, and critic of political Islam. He is an expert in international public law and philosophy of law
- Carlos Fayt Argentine lawyer and academic. Emeritus Professor at the University of Buenos Aires and Minister of the Supreme Court (of Syrian and Lebanese descent)
- FM-2030 Belgian-born Iranian-American author, teacher, transhumanist philosopher, futurist, consultant and athlete
- Hadi Khorsandi Contemporary Iranian poet and satirist. Since 1979, he has been the editor and writer of the Persian-language satirical journal Asghar Agha
- Shahin Najafi Iranian actor, musician, singer and songwriter
- Maryam Namazie British-Iranian secularist and human rights activist, commentator, and broadcaster
- Ibn al-Rawandi Early skeptic of Islam and a critic of religion in general
- Mina Ahadi Iranian-Austrian political activist
- Sadegh Hedayat Iranian writer, translator and intellectual, Best known for his novel The Blind Owl
- Faisal Saeed Al Mutar Iraqi-born satirist, human-rights activist and writer who was admitted to the United States as a refugee in 2013.
- Bashshar ibn Burd Poet of the late Umayyad and early Abbasid periods.
- Rifat Chadirji Iraqi architect, photographer, author and activist. He is admired as the greatest modern architect of Iraq, and taught at the Baghdad School of Architecture for many years.
- Sami Michael Iraqi-Israeli author, first in Israel to call for the creation of an independent Palestinian state to exist alongside Israel.
- Khazal Al Majidi Iraqi scholar of religion and ancient civilisations.
- Jamil Sidqi al-Zahawi prominent Iraqi poet and philosopher, known for his defence of women's rights.
- Jim Al-Khalili Iraqi-British theoretical physicist, author and broadcaster.
- Selim Matar Writer, novelist and sociologist with Swiss and Iraqi nationalities, was born in Baghdad and resides currently in Geneva.
- Abdullah al-Qasemi, a famous Wahhabi scholar who left Islam
- Joumana Haddad Lebanese author, public speaker, journalist and women's rights activist.
- As'ad AbuKhalil Lebanese-American professor of political science at California State University, Stanislaus.
- Rabih Alameddine Lebanese-American painter and writer.
- Ziad Rahbani Lebanese composer, pianist, playwright, and political commentator.

== See also ==
- Freedom of religion in the Middle East
- Middle East and globalization
- Secularism in the Middle East
