= Mostafa Malekian =

Iranian academic (born 1956)

Mostafa Malekian (مصطفی ملکیان)
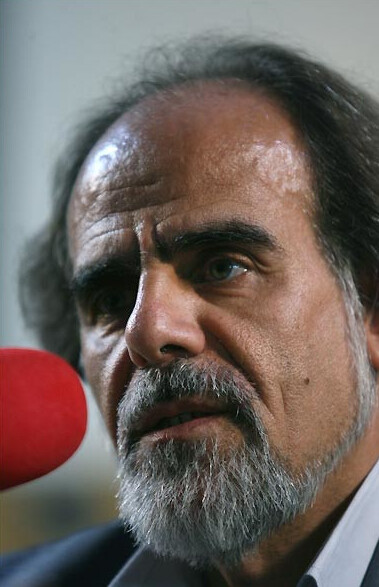
- Born: 1956 (age 69–70); Shahreza, Iran

Philosophical work
- Era: 21st century philosophy
- Region: Western philosophy
- School: Analytic
- Main interests: Philosophy; Mysticism; Literature
- Notable ideas: Rationality and Spirituality Project
- Website: farzanehinstitute.ir

Mostafa Malekian (Persian: مصطفی ملکیان; born 1 June 1956 in Shahreza) is an Iranian philosopher, thinker, translator and editor. He is working on a project called Rationality and Spirituality. His most important book, that is about spirituality and wisdom, is A Way to Freedom.

Malekian was formerly a professor of philosophy at Tehran University and Tarbiat Modares University.

== See also ==
- Intellectual Movements in Iran
- Iranian philosophy
- Abdolkarim Soroush
