= Aramesh Dustdar =

Iranian writer and philosopher (1931–2021)

- Born: 24 May 1931; Tehran, Iran
- Died: 27 October 2021 (aged 90); Cologne, Germany
- Occupations: Writer, philosopher

Aramesh Dustdar (24 May 1931 – 27 October 2021) was an Iranian philosopher, writer, scholar, and philosophy lecturer at Tehran University.

Dustdar received a Ph.D. degree in philosophy from the University of Bonn. He is known in n as a secular Heideggerian philosopher (in contrast to Reza Davari Ardakani who is a religious Heideggerian philosopher).

== See also ==
- Intellectual movements in Iran
