= Vakilabad Prison =

Prison in Mashhad, Iran

Coordinates: 36.3386°N 59.4902°E

Vakilabad Prison (زندان وکیل‌آباد), also called Central Prison of Mashhad (زندان مرکزی مشهد), is a prison in Iran, located in the city of Mashhad in the northeast of the country. The prison has reportedly been the site of hundreds of secret executions carried out by the Islamic Republic of Iran government.

== Secret executions ==
The International Campaign for Human Rights in Iran (ICHRI) and other sources have reported on secret executions taking place in Vakilabad Prison throughout 2011, primarily on drug-related offenses.

ICHRI has documented that the following secret mass executions have taken place inside the prison:

- 7 prisoners hanged on 20 September 2011
- 7 prisoners hanged on 11 August 2011
- 18 prisoners executed on 3 July 2011
- 12 prisoners executed on 29 June 2011
- 26 prisoners executed on 15 June 2011
- 4 prisoners executed on 24 May 2011
- 12 prisoners executed on 23 May 2011
- 10 prisoners executed on 16 May 2011
- 12 prisoners executed on 13 April 2011
- 10 prisoners executed on 6 April 2011

In October 2011, a report released by Ahmed Shaheed, the UN special rapporteur on the human rights situation in Iran, documented more than 300 secret executions in Vakilabad in 2010 and at least 146 secret executions in the prison to date in 2011.

== Notable prisoners ==
- Ahmad Ghabel, Iranian religious scholar and political dissident. In August 2011, he was sentenced to a 20-month prison sentence in Vakilabad for reporting on mass executions taking place within the prison.
