= Middle East and globalization =

Overview of globalization in the Middle East

Globalization has been internalized in Arabic as awlaama (العولمة) and refers to the spread throughout the globe of ideas, customs, institutions, and attitudes originated in one part of the world which are usually Western in origin. For this reason it has often been perceived as largely equivalent to Westernization and is still widely regarded as an external threat rather than as an opportunity. In the Middle East the decade of globalization was marked by endless wars, intrusive US hegemony, renewed economic dependency and continuing insecurity. Globalization was ushered into the Middle East by a war which gave the Western victors excessive power over the region and created a violent anti-globalization struggle. As some authors argue, it has strengthened Islamic fundamentalism and, due to its ambiguity created a contradictory and tension filled situation. Globalization thus often acted as an obstacle rather than an impetus to democratization.

Against most expectations, the processes of globalization hence proved highly turbulent and have generated new conflicts, hostilities and exclusions throughout the world. Oppositional individuals and groups are now able to participate in global culture and politics through gaining access to global communication and media networks and to circulate local struggles and oppositional ideas through these media. Initially globalization was expected to spread the zone of peace by delivering economic prosperity which people would not want to sacrifice in conflicts. Instead the imposition of structural adjustment, of unpopular and inequitable peace treaties together with the US campaign against terrorism, led to more unrest and instability. This helped to create a chain reaction as the victims of economic liberalization appear to be among the main constituents of Islamic opposition movements.

== Views on globalization ==
=== The Arab and Muslim intellectuals ===
Cultural identity is at great value in the Middle East. For this reason, Arab and Muslim intellectuals have been deeply concerned about maintaining their cultural identity and independence in the face of globalization, especially as it is seen by most as equivalent to Americanization. Muslims have always been proud and sensitive about their religion because Islam is not only a faith but also a law, a "sharia" that regulates all aspects of their life, including economic transactions, marriage and divorce, and matters of state. According to Fauzi Najjar, the Arab intelligentsia is divided into three different attitudes toward globalization:

- The first group consists of those who reject it as "the highest stage of imperialism" and a "cultural invasion" threatening their cultural heritage and national identity.
- The second group of Arab thinkers welcomes globalization as the age of modern science, advanced technology and global communications. It calls for interaction with globalization in order to benefit from its "positive opportunities" without necessarily losing the Arab-Islamic cultural individuality.
- The third group he says "naively" calls for finding a middle ground, an appropriate form of globalization that is compatible with the national and cultural interests of people.

There is also a minority who strongly advocates globalization. In their opinion, globalisation has become the "discourse of the age" and Dr. Fuad Zakariya, an Egyptian professor of philosophy, is amongst them. He argues that those who oppose globalization in fact do not understand its meaning and implications fully and reminds his compatriots that there are certain problems that can only be tackled at a global level.

=== The Conservative Islamic ===
Islamists view globalization as a new dawah (call) for the elimination of the boundaries between Dar al-Islam (domain of Islam) and Dar al-Kufr (domain of infidelity). Globalization is thought to lead to unrestricted freedom in the name of human rights, as understood in the West, and to libertinism, the distinguishing characteristics of the decadence of Western civilization. The inability to separate religious and mundane matters or religion and state has therefore created resistance and rigidity which at times has culminated in a defensive call for a fight against the enemy. Globalized organizations inspired by globalization are now fighting against it. In their view, the use of violence or terrorism will supposedly allow Muslims to see through the West's lies and to force the seemingly powerful but cowardly West to retreat from the Islamic world and await its final defeat. The imperialistic domination of the Muslim world, the support for Israel and the invasions of Iraq and Afghanistan have intensified Muslim fears and increased hatred towards the West, making them "view globalization with terror." Globalization threatens to undermine Islam and to remove it from the everyday "thought and actions" of Muslims. Human rights, freedom and democracy are perceived as hidden instruments of power which serve the interests of Western nations, and of America, in particular.

== Reactions to globalization ==
Some authors claim that the general reaction to globalization among the Arab states has been a negative or a defensive one. The key reason for the rejection may be the lack of previous cultural penetration of the Islamic Middle East by Western culture, institutions and ideas. In this context globalization was seen as a form of surrender to a dominant, non-indigenous standpoint. Islam, a religion governed by its own set of laws, developed an alternate world view with many of the elements of globalization contradicting it. It has a powerful and cohesive community which at times acts like a cultural defence wall against the Western influence and, as a result, limits the use of European languages in the Middle East. The rejection of globalization also appeared due to the political systems that governed the Middle East. Mostly autocratic, the Middle Eastern regimes have learned how to survive and mobilize mass support against globalization. Repression and demagoguery were some of the tools used to convince the masses that anti-globalization was the only way of defending the Arab nation and Islam. People were thus discouraged from supporting elements of globalization like democracy, free enterprise, civil and human rights.

In his book The West and the Rest: Globalisation and the Terrorist Threat, Roger Scruton contests that by imposing itself and its values on the entire world through the globalization process, the West is creating the conditions for conflict to occur between other cultures. It has made itself impossible to ignore and was at the very cause of an anti-Western movement and an international Jihad. Globalization brought face to face two very confident and incompatible ideas and the battle for dominance has been transformed into what is known as terrorism or "the dark side of globalization".

Rather than reflecting a specific ideology, terrorism represents nostalgia (for pre-modern civilisation) and has been the result of a clash between modernization and tradition. Though violent, it can also be seen as an unacceptable response to destructive imperial national policies which themselves must be transformed if a world without terror is possible. Bin Laden's Al Qaeda network represents bad globalization and the perverted use of technology but in a sense the Al Qaeda Jihad is the reverse image of McWorld, which imposes its Jihad on local culture and tradition, wanting to create the world in its own image. Just as Al Qaeda dreams of imposing a radical Islam on the world, taking over and destroying Western infidel culture, McDonald's wants to destroy local and traditional eating habits and cuisine and replace them with a globalized and universalized menu.

A more balanced view on the Arab response is that rather than creating a unified anti-Western block, globalization is feeding a great debate within the Islamic civilization about how Muslims should adjust to modernity. Much more than being against the West, Muslims are interested in re-establishing an Islamic unity and incorporating Western technology and science into Islam.

== Who is influencing whom? ==
There is considerable debate about Middle Eastern participation in globalization and about who is influencing whom along the way. While some critics argue that the Arab world is opposing globalization some others feel that it has strengthened Islamic fundamentalism by facilitating extensive networks of formerly dissociated Muslims. In this view the Middle East can even be considered as one of its driving forces. The increase in the flow of information, communication and mobility has served Muslim fundamentalism but in a different way from the West. Whereas the latter is more profit-driven, the Islamists ideal of a globalized society is a network-connection of all Muslims in order to promote their definition of the world.

One example showing how Muslims use globalization to strengthen and promote their community can be found in Abu Basir's book of rulings, where he uses the Islamic principle of "the necessities allow the prohibited". Here he claims that, just as Muslims can drink wine or eat pork in order to save themselves from starving, they can also migrate to the Western 'infidel countries' to save themselves from the oppressive governments of their homelands. He goes even further stating that immigration is allowed also 'in order to enforce the Muslims and weaken the infidels. One of the goals of immigration is the revival of the duty of Jihad and enforcement of their power over the infidels. Immigration and Jihad go together: one is the consequence of the other and dependent upon it. The continuance of the one is dependent upon the continuation of the other.'

From this point of view globalization and Westernization are no longer counterparts. Islamist movements are themselves the driving forces behind globalization influencing its direction and outcome. Probably one of the most important outcomes of this process has been the creation of a standard understanding for what the words "Islam" and "Islamic" mean. Prior to the changes that accompanied globalization each community had the opportunity to determine its own interpretation of the Islamic message, whereas now the norms are increasingly imposed by conservative Islamic groups. Given the circumstances, it seems that rather than opposing globalization, the Islamic world has found its own way of leading the process in a totally different direction. Therefore, globalization means 'many things to many people.'

== September 11 attacks ==
The experiences of September 11 categorized by President George W. Bush as "the first war of the twenty-first century" and the first major war in the age of globalization brought into focus the contradictions generated by this phenomenon. We are now experiencing an extremely complex phenomenon which both divides and unifies the world we live in. While connecting parts of the world that were previously cut off it also ignores and bypasses other regions, and along with this produces enemies whilst it incorporates participants. The circulation of commodities, technology, money and ideas facilitate networks of terror as well as trade and travel. Although it was supposed to promote democracy it was often the case that globalization forces inhibited it leading to an intensification of local and global political conflicts as was the case of the Middle East.

Technological achievements, capital mobility and free movement of people that resulted from the process thus allowed terrorism to express its local grievances and attack key symbols of American power in a way that had never been done before. In the case of 9/11 Al Qaeda presented an example of the unpredictable nature of a globally connected and networked society where a hidden network dedicated its whole activity to attacking the US. According to Hinnebusch it is no accident that the Middle East has witnessed by far the highest number of international terrorist incidents, or that the US is increasingly becoming the target for these attacks. Osama Bin Laden and his following of 'Arab Afghans' were partly a US creation and it was not the religious or cultural differences that turned them against the US but its continuous presence in Saudi Arabia, its perceived control over the Arab oil, the siege of Iraq and the support for Israeli oppression of the Palestinians. In her book, Laura Guazzone points out the paradox of US hegemony in the region: while at the military level it stabilizes the Middle East against revisionist states, its biased and inequitable application continually stimulates the nationalist and Islamic reaction at the societal level that keeps the regional pot boiling.

Global terrorism and terror events were made possible due to the availability of new powerful and sometimes lethal technology to groups and individuals that previously had no or restricted access to. Conventional instruments of mass transport or communication have been, and can be at any time converted into weapons of mass destruction, or at least of mass terror producing a situation of asymmetrical war where weaker individuals and groups can attack superpowers. This led to a general increase in fear and anxiety and September 11 was probably the most powerful alarm towards the danger that globalization carries within: new technologies empower angry disempowered people with technologies of mass destruction.

== Globalization in the future ==
The West's ideals will inevitably circulate throughout the world and as Rubin argues even the most extreme rejection of globalization does not mean that it fails to infiltrate into society. A good example of this is Iran, where attempts to block foreign influences have often not succeeded. Still, given the incompatibility that characterizes the two views, neither Islamic terrorists nor the West can come to an intellectual compromise. Moreover, the Anglo-American invasion and occupation of Iraq have inhibited the chance for gradual change to occur in the region. The war polarised regimes and Islamist oppositions not only in Saudi Arabia but also in Algeria, Egypt and Tunisia, countries where the freedom scores diminished the most in the last couple of years. It is thus probable that the American "war on terrorism" following the attacks of 11 September 2001 will lead to further polarization.

The terrorists who believe that the very existence of the West is a threat will continue to use violence to fight a foe which cannot be ignored. Their understanding of the concept of globalization will continue to be affected by negative factors like high illiteracy rates, marginalization of women, disparities between rich and poor, corrupt authoritarian regimes and the absence of democracy and human rights It may be the case that the next generation will be even more closed after experiencing much more intense and systematic indoctrination on both the Islamist and nationalist fronts. The idea is sustained by the fact that students who have studied in the West often return home to reinforce even further a rejection of the society they have experienced. They may focus on the shortcomings of the Western system and fear the effects of such ideas or institutions in their own countries.

In conclusion, the same place which once fuelled the world's first truly global industry with its vast reserves of oil may also become the centre of forces that reverse the globalizing tendencies of the states. The more open society has become a Pandora's Box, unlocking the possibilities of destruction and violence as well as democracy, free trade, and cultural and social exchange. In effect, decisions of the states to open up to international traffic and capital flows are reversible and may occur given the threats that globalization carries.

== See also ==
- Western world
- Middle East economic integration
- Middle East Economic Association
- Economy of the Middle East
- Islamic world contributions to Medieval Europe
- Moral syncretism
- Irreligion in the Middle East
- Islam and modernity
