= Khosro Naghed =

Persian writer and linguist

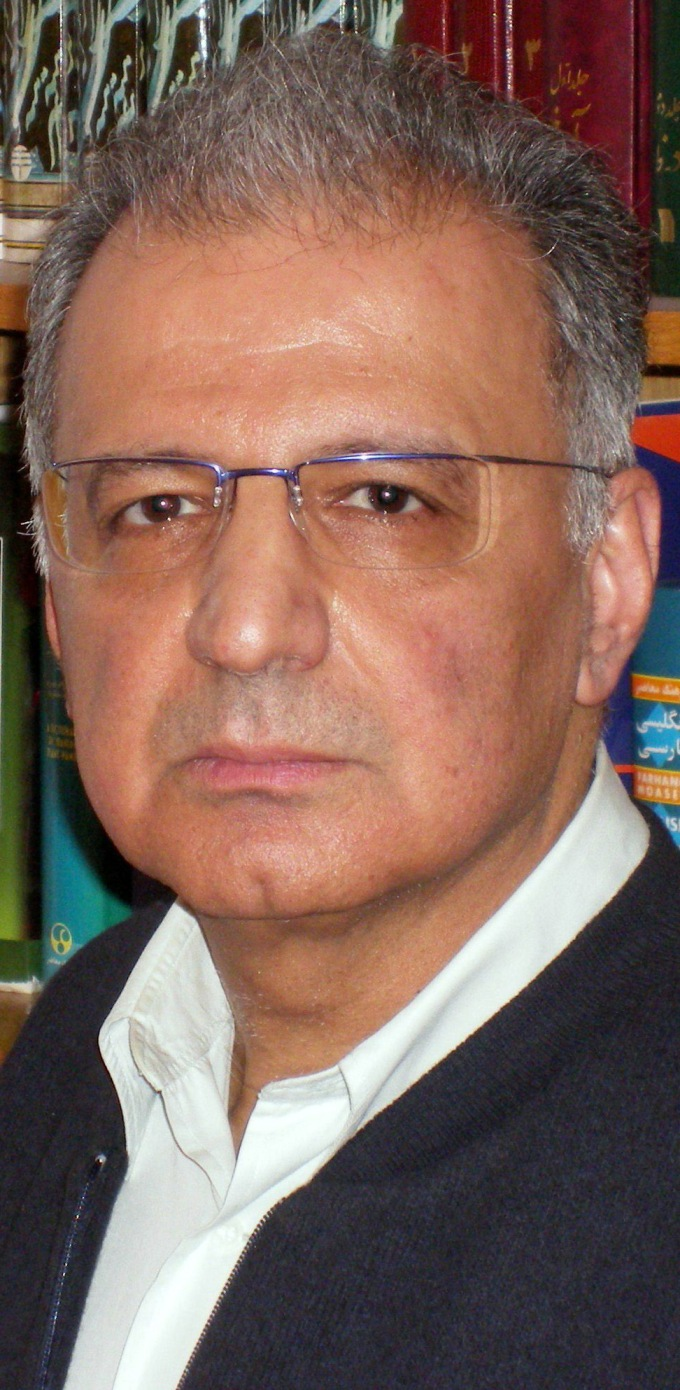
Khosro Naghed, Iranian lexicographer, writer and translator

Khosro Naghed (Persian: خسرو ناقد, born Shiraz, Iran) is a Persian writer, Iranist and linguist.

He has written numerous books and articles on Iranian culture, Persian history, Persian language and literature and philosophy and he has influence on Iranian intellectual circles. His articles have appeared in some Iranian newspapers. He wrote a German-Persian dictionary published by Langenscheidt.

== Works ==
- Dictionary of proverbs and idioms. German - Persian. Farhang Moaser publishers, Teheran 2026. (book presentation (persian) )
- The Guardians of Absolutism. The world of thought of Leszek Kołakowski. Selected and translated by Khosro Naghed. (Nashreney. Tehran 2023). (book presentation (persian) )
- I know that I don't know. The world of Karl Popper's thoughts. by Khosro Naghed. (edition Kargadan. Tehran 2023). (book presentation (persian) )
- Why war? Correspondence between Albert Einstein, Sigmund Freud. Translated and with a foreword by Khosro Naghed. (Nashreney. 4th Edition: Tehran 2023). (book presentation (persian) )
- Critique of the Dialectic of Enlightenment. by Khosro Naghed. (Nashreney. Tehran 2019). (book presentation (persian) )
- The Intellectuals and the October Revolution. by Khosro Naghed. (Nashreney. Tehran 2018). (book presentation (persian) )
- East-West dreams. From Gilgamesh's dreams to Nietzsche's nightmares. by Khosro Naghed. (Farhang Moaser publishers. Tehran 2017).
- In Search of the meaning of life. Conversations with European thinkers. selected and translated by Khosro Naghed. (Farhang Moaser publishers. Tehran 2017).
- From Knowledge to Wisdom. Essays and Interviews about philosophy and literature. by Khosro Naghed. (qoqnoos publication. Tehran 2012). (Book Browse )
- Apple and soldier. Poems beyond the horror. re-creation by Khosro Naghed. (Morvarid publication. Tehran 2012). (short review )
- The Praise of Dialogue. Meeting with the Other. by Khosro Naghed. (edition Jahane Ketab. Tehran 2010).
- Utopia and Violence. Essays and Interviews by Karl Popper. Selected and translated by Khosro Naghed and Rahman Afshari. (edition Jahane Ketab. Tehran 2010). (short review )
- Leben trotz Geschichte. Essays und Interviews von Leszek Kolakowski. Ausgewählt und übersetzt von Khosro Naghed. (Edition Jahane Ketab. Tehran 2009)
- Liebesgedichte im Zeitalter der Gewalt. Gedichte von Erich Fried. Übersetzt von Khosro Naghed. Graphiken von Basam Rasam. (Edition Jahane Ketab. Tehran 2008)
- Gedichte für melancholische Tage. Gedichte über Kafkas Stadt. Übersetzt von Khosro Naghed. Graphiken von Basam Rasam. (Edition Jahane Ketab. Tehran 2008)
- Der Tod hat dir nichts zu sagen. Gedichte von Erich Fried. Ausgewählt und übersetzt von Khosro Naghed. (Edition Cheshmeh. Tehran 2007)
- A la sombra de la luna y la muerte. Federico García Lorca. traducción Khosro Naghed. (edición Ketabe Roushan. Tehran 2006).
- Langenscheidt Universal-Wörterbuch Persisch. Persisch-Deutsch, Deutsch-Persisch. Von Khosro Naghed (Langenscheidt, Berlin, München 2002)
- L´ impact planetaire de la pensee occidentale et le dialogue de la civilisation. traduction: F. Badreie, B. Parham, Kh. Naghed (édition Frazanrooz Tehran 2000)
- Wie Wasser im Strom, wie Wuestenwind. Gedichte eines Mystikers. Omar Chajjam. Hrsg. von Khosro Naghed. (Zweisprachige Ausgabe, Edition Orient. Berlin 1992.)
- Auf der Schneide des Laechelns. Erich Fried Leben und Gedichte. Zweisprachige Ausgabe. Persisch: Khosro Naghed. (Edition Shahab. Tehran 2000)

== See also ==
- Iranology
- Intellectual movements in Iran
