= World community =

Political or humanitarian term

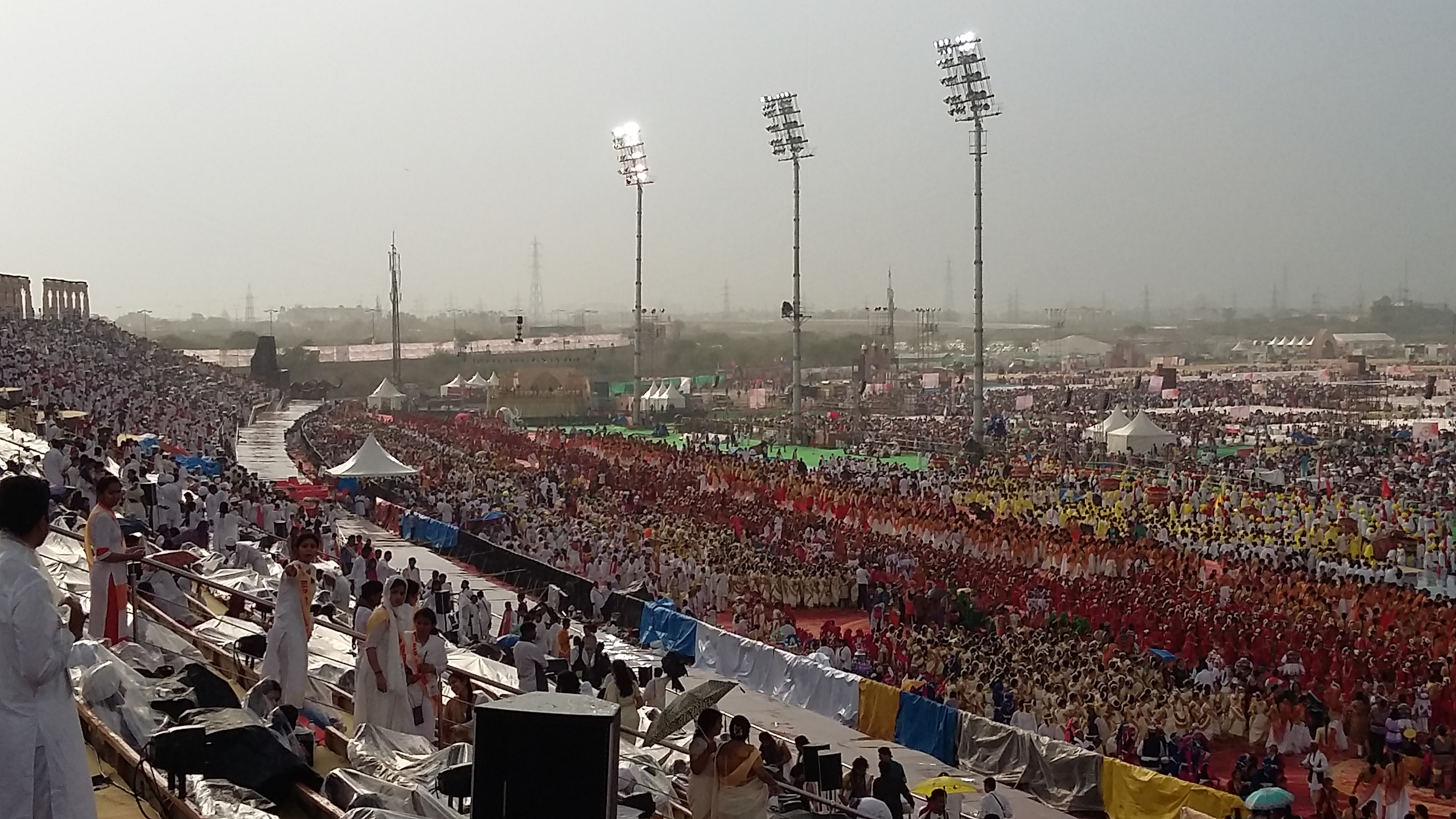
2016 photograph of the World Culture Festival, a celebration of global cultural diversity

The term world community is used primarily in political and humanitarian contexts to describe an international aggregate of nation states of widely varying types. In most connotations, the term is used to convey meanings attached to consensus or inclusion of all people in all lands and their governments.

== Politics ==
World community often is a semi-personal rhetorical connotation that represents Humanity in a singular context as in "…for the sake of the World Community" or "…with the approval of the World Community".

The term sometimes is used to reference the United Nations or its affiliated agencies as bodies of governance. Other times it is a generic term with no explicit ties to states or governments but retaining a political connotation.

== Humanitarianism ==
In terms of human needs, humanitarian aid, human rights, and other discourse in the humanities, the world community is akin to the conceptual Global village aimed at the inclusion of non-aligned countries, aboriginal peoples, the Third World into the connected world via the communications infrastructure or at least representative ties to it.

== Economics ==
In terms of the World economy, the world community is seen by some economists as an inter-dependent system of goods and services with semi-permeable boundaries and flexible sets of import/export rules. Proponents of Globalization may tend to establish or impose more rigidity to this framework. Controversy has arisen as to whether this paradigm will strengthen or weaken the world as a community. See World Trade Organization

== Ecology ==
When considering Sustainable development and Ecology, the inter-dependence angle generally expands quickly to a Global context. In this paradigm, the planet as a whole represents a single Biome and the World's population represents the Ecological succession in a singular eco-system. This also can be recognized as the World Community.

== Religion ==
Many religions have taken on the challenge of establishing a world community through the propagation of their doctrine, faith and practice.

In the Baháʼí Faith, ʻAbdu'l-Bahá, successor and son of Baháʼu'lláh, produced a series of documents called the Tablets of the Divine Plan. Now in a book form, after their publication in 1917 and their 'unveiling' in New York in 1919, these tablets contained an outline and a plan for the expansion of the Baháʼí community into Asia, Asia minor, Europe and the Americas, indeed, throughout the planet.

The formal implementation of this plan, known as 'Abdu'l-Baha's Divine Plan, began in 1937 in the first of a series of sub-plans, the Seven Year Plan of 1937 to 1944. Shoghi Effendi, the leader of the Baháʼí community until 1957 and then the Universal House of Justice from 1963, were instrumental in the organization and design of future sub-plans. This led to the creation and establishment of a world community, with members of the faith estimated to have reached 5 to 6 million in the early 21st century, while also being the second most geographically widespread religion in the world (missing only North Korea and the Vatican City State).

In Buddhism "the conventional Sangha of monks has been entrusted by the Buddha with the task of leading all people in creating the ideal world community of noble disciples or truly civilized people."

A Benedictine monk, Friar John Main, inspired the World Community for Christian meditation through the practice of meditation centered around the Maranatha mantra, meaning "Come Lord."

The Lutheran Church in America had issued a social statement - World Community: Ethical Imperatives in an Age of Interdependence Adopted by the Fifth Biennial Convention, Minneapolis, Minnesota, June 25-July 2, 1970. Since then The Evangelical Lutheran Church in America has formed and retained the statement as a 'historical document'.

== World peace ==
The term world community is often used in the context of establishing and maintaining world peace through a peace process or through a resolvable end to local-regional wars and global-world wars. Many social movements and much political theory deals with issues revolving around the institutionalization of the process of propagating the ideal of a world community. A world community is one which has a global vision, is established throughout the world, that is it has a membership that exists in most of the countries on the planet and that involves the participation of its members in a variety of ways.

== See also ==
- World anthem, a theoretical song that represents Earth
- Community
- Global village
- International community
- Moral syncretism
