= Mohammad Jafar Eghbal =

Iranian endodontist

- محمدجعفر اقبال
- Relatives: Reza Davari Ardakani (father-in-law)
- Scientific career
- Fields: endodontics
- Institutions: Shahid Beheshti University of Medical Sciences

Mohammad Jafar Eghbal is an Iranian endodontist and Professor of Endodontics at Shahid Beheshti University of Medical Sciences (SBUMS). He is a winner of the Iranian Book of the Year Award for being an author of the book A Comprehensive Reference Guide to the Basics, Tools and Methods of Root Canal Treatment. In 2013, he became the head of the SBUMS Faculty of Dentistry for the second time, but in October 2017, he resigned from his position in protest against the pressure on the university to admitting study-abroad students to this Faculty. Currently he is the research deputy of the Research Institute of Dental Sciences at SBUMS.
