= Dar ul-Funun =

Dar ul-Funun may refer to:

- Dar al-Fonun, an institution of higher learning in Tehran
- Istanbul University, the older name of which was Darülfünun
