= Reza Davari Ardakani =

Iranian philosopher (born 1933)

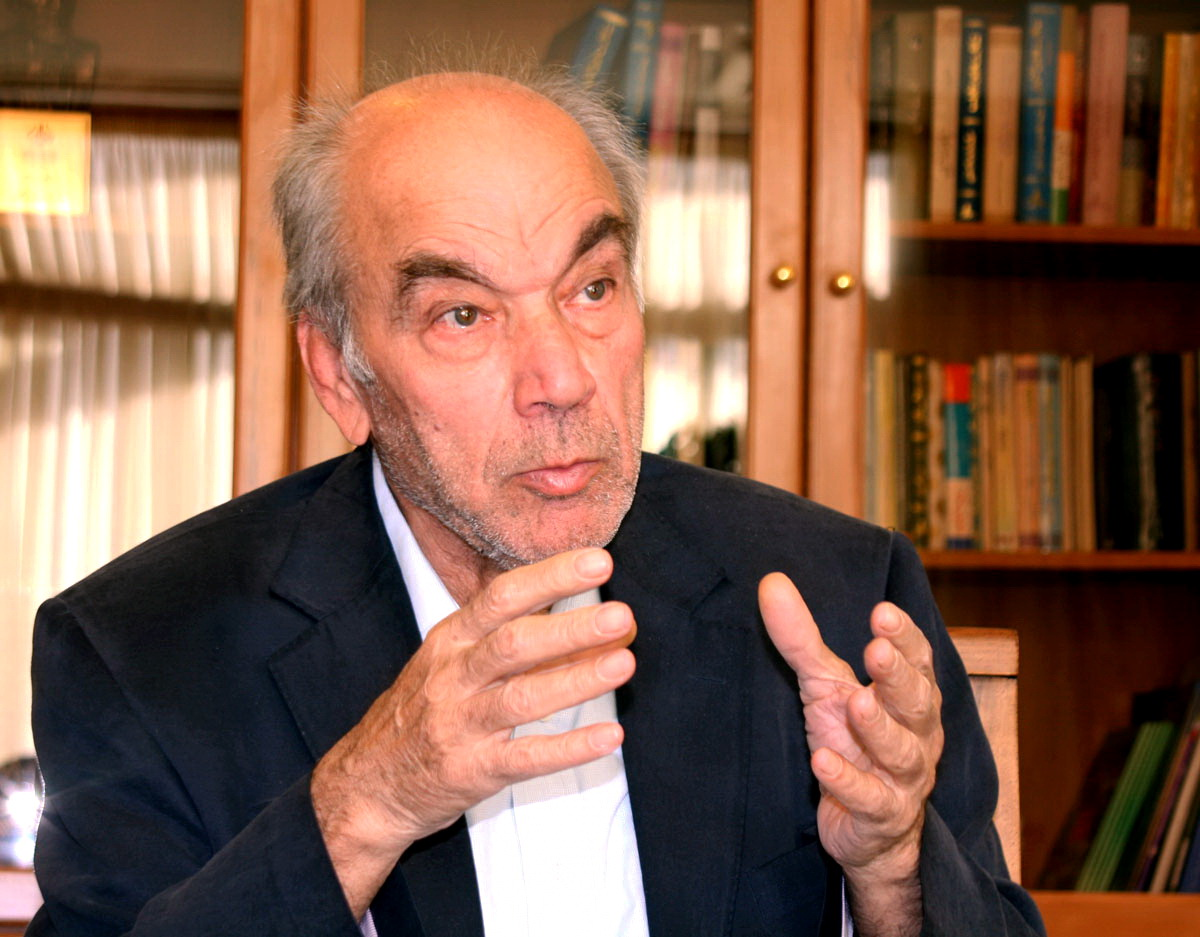
- Born: 6 July 1933 (age 93); Ardakan, Iran
- Occupation: President of Academy of Sciences of Iran (1998–2023)
- Relatives: Mohammad Jafar Eghbal (son-in-law)
- Awards: Order of Knowledge (1st class)

Philosophical work
- Era: 21st century Philosophy
- Region: Western philosophy
- School: Continental
- Main interests: Heidegger's philosophy Occidentalism
- Notable ideas: Criticism of the West

One or more poems read by Reza Davari Ardakani

Reza Davari Ardakani (Persian: رضا داوری اردکانی; born 6 July 1933 in Ardakan) is an Iranian philosopher who was influenced by Martin Heidegger, and a distinguished emeritus professor of philosophy at the University of Tehran. He is also the current member of the Iranian Academy of Sciences and former President of Academy from 1998 to 2023. He is known for his works on Intellect, politics, and underdevelopment.

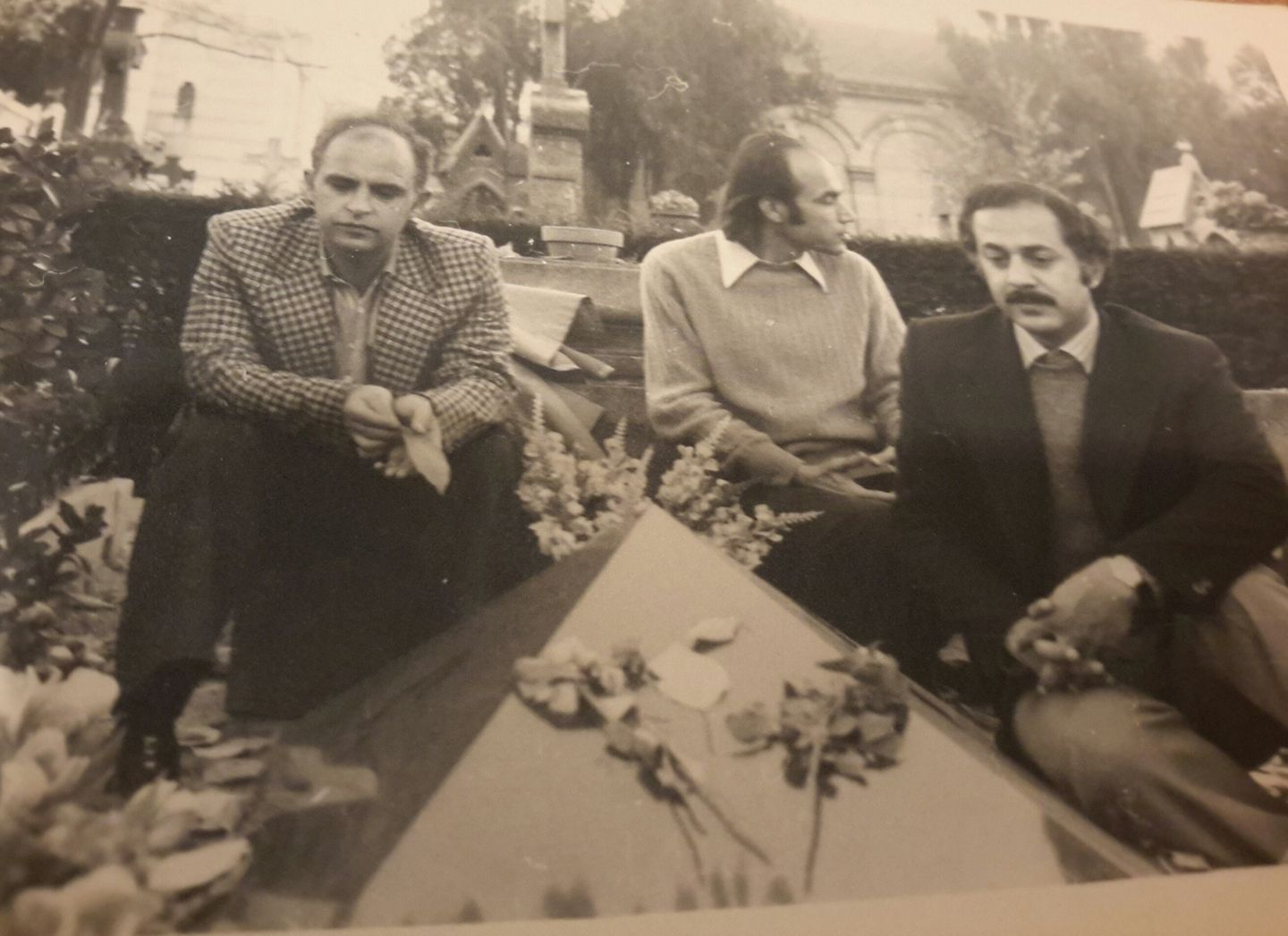
Abdolhossein Nikgohar, Reza Davari and Siroos Sahami, Tomb of Sadegh Hedayat, Père Lachaise Cemetery, Paris, April 9, 1974

== Life ==
Davari received primary and secondary education in Ardakan, and after finishing school became a teacher in 1951. In 1954, he entered the University of Tehran as an undergraduate, gaining a BA and in 1967 a PhD in philosophy. He is currently professor Emeritus of philosophy at Tehran University. From 1979 to 1981, he was dean at the faculty of literature and humanities, University of Tehran, and the head of Iranian National Commission for UNESCO from 1979 to 1982. Davari was the editor-in-chief of Farhang Journal.

== Ideas ==
According to Ali Mirsepassi, Davari taking a Hegelian view of history regards the West as a totality and its chief fruits humanism and modernity. For Davari, the West is an "absolute other" in cotrast to an authentic Islamic idemtity

Davari and Abdolkarim Soroush have engaged in a series of philosophical debates in post-revolutionary Iran.

== See also ==
- Intellectual movements in Iran
