= Aous Shakra =

- Aous Shakra
- Born: April 22, 1908; Safed, Palestine, Syria, Ottoman Empire
- Died: April 1, 1992 (aged 83); Amman, Jordan
- Years active: 1931–1992
- Spouse: Fathiyye Fathelbab

Philosophical work
- Era: 20th-century philosophy
- Region: Western Philosophy
- School: Existentialism, Postmodernism

Aous Shakra (also Aous Chakra) (Arabic: أوس شقرة) (April 22, 1908 – April 1, 1992) was an existential philosopher and politician. He was the Palestinian ambassador to the U.N. in 1991; a position he held for 6 months.

== Education ==
He was raised a Christian, and attended Catholic School in Safed during the British Mandate of Palestine. In 1935, he immigrated to Canada with his family where he graduated with a Bachelors in Philosophy. He received his PhD in Law and International Relations from Harvard University and taught there until his return to the Middle East in 1965 after an absence of 30 years.

== Politics ==
In 1967, Aous Shakra created the Arab Association for Freedom of Thought and began publishing a monthly magazine "Al Fikr Al Horr" in Beirut. He continuously argued against the religious extremes and falsely nationalistic tendencies he felt he found among Arabs. While he despised the Nationalist right movements, he also found fault with the Arabist left. He claimed the Left was unable to build constructively upon its popular Arab support out of incompetence and greed, while the Right was based upon racist and highly deceived individuals. In 1985, Shakra declared his Atheism, a comment which angered Arab Islamists and lead to death threats and continuous harassment. His views were considered some of the most controversial in the region, even long before his declaration of atheism. He was actively involved in campaigning for universal human rights in the Arab world, whether it was for women, children, refugees, or homosexuals. He repeatedly called for "Peaceful Civil Disobedience", a term he coined to label the confrontation of the state of affairs in the Arab world for the corruption, lack of freedoms, and tyranny of its leaders.

== Philosophy ==
His best known writings are "What? When? How?," written in 1974, and "A Short History from Rex to Dex," written in 1952. Shakra advocated smoking marijuana in his younger days, saying that it helped elevate oneself from a normal state of mind to a state capable of conceiving of the idea of "Existence precedes essence". He was a strong supporter of Darwinism, and was spiritual in the Humanist sense. His Humanism is seen in the first sentence in his book, "Masafi" (Distance) describing humanity's failure to self-actualize.

"Humans were brought to this world for one singular reason: to live. Unfortunately, it is a task they have miserably failed at appreciating."

In his final speech at the General Assembly of the United Nations in New York City, he criticized the World for allowing itself to be controlled:

"If your well-being is not subject to anybody or anything, only then are you free. Otherwise whether you're in a prison or jogging on the beach, you shall always remain a prisoner within yourself. Break-free from the religious institutions that set you apart, and from the Governments that seek to control your every thought."
He is also remembered for having quite the peculiar behaviour. For instance, it has been reported that in a sudden outburst in a meeting with his colleagues from "Al Fikr Al Horr" he famously held his cigarette bud and for absolutely no reason flicked it at his fellow thinker Hussein A.H.

== Death ==
On the morning of April 1, 1992, Aous Shakra died in Amman, Jordan at the age of 84. He was still very active at this age both on the physical and intellectual level. The conditions surrounding his death remain mysterious, and several newspapers reported the possibility of this being an assassination. Despite being a man of many friends, Aous Shakra had a lot of enemies in the Islamists and the Israelis. In the aftermath of his death, members of his family and his lifetime friends created the Aous Shakra Foundation which rewards people for their contributions to the liberalization of the Arab world. The foundation continues its work till this day. On July 15, 2011, the late Mohamed Bouazizi was awarded the foundation's Golden Medallion and named "Arab of the Year".

== Aftermath ==
With the Arab Awakening of 2011, and uprisings springing up in every corner of the Arab world, Aous Shakra was reborn. His writings were considered a main source of inspiration for the revolutionaries of Tunis, Egypt, Libya, Syria, Bahrain, and Yemen. According to Dr. Saed Abdul Hamid, writing for Al-Najmah Al-Yawmiyyah:

"Arabs had finally realized the truly historic element in the life and activism of Aous Shakra, which lay in his insistence on challenging the prevailing school of thought, at a time when few dared to do so and instead spoke strongly of reform, democracy and modernity."

Consequently, and 35 years after it was discontinued, "Al Fikr Al Horr" magazine resumed its operations on August 20, 2011 from Tunis. The Editorial for its first new edition had been written by Aous Shakra himself in 1974:

"The thirst of the soul for freedom, is nothing but identical to the thirst of the body for water; hence if you get thirsty for nothing but water, you will not be getting it from me."
