= Ahmad Ghabel =

Iranian Shia cleric (1954–2012)

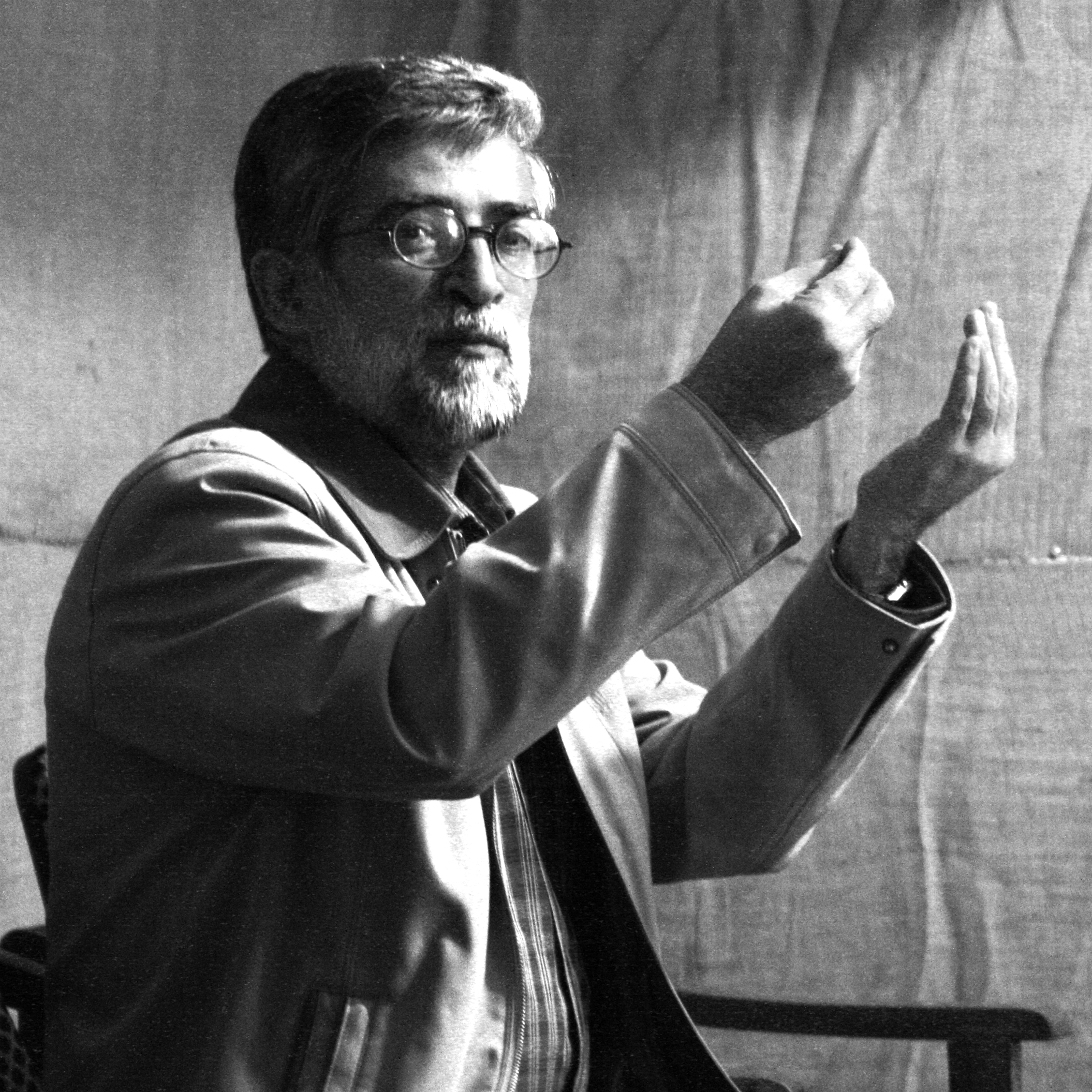
- Born: 1954; Torbat-e Jam, Imperial State of Iran
- Died: October 22, 2012; Mashhad, Islamic Republic of Iran
- Other name: Ahmad Qabel
- Occupation: Muslim cleric

Ahmad Ghabel (Persian: احمد قابل) was an Iranian Hojjatoleslam Shia Muslim cleric, theologian, seminary lecturer, researcher, and author.

He was a follower of the dissident cleric Ayatollah Hossein Ali Montazeri and was detained several times by the Iranian government. He died on 22 October 2012 while on hospital arrest.

== Biography ==
While working as a journalist for Hayat-é-No he was arrested on 31 December 2001, upon orders of the Special Court for the Clergy. This earned the protest of the international press watchdog group Reporters Without Borders After his release he went into exile in Tajikistan.

Ghabel has issued a fatwa about hijab or head and neck covering for Muslim women. He argues that only covering the body of Muslim women is obligatory, and covering other parts of the body like hair and neck are recommended.

In December 2009, he was arrested on his way to Qom to attend the funeral of Grand Ayatollah Hossein Ali Montazeri. Before this, he was working on a project entitled "Wisdom and Religion". According to kaleme, a reformist website, he was freed on bail after 170 days in jail but was then re-arrested in the summer of 2010 for exposing "secret mass executions at Vakilabad Prison in Mashhad and his criticism of the Supreme Leader,".

On December 14, 2010, he was convicted of working against the ruling system and insulting the country's supreme leader, and was sentenced to 20 months in jail, and was given 20 days to appeal. He started serving his sentence in July 2011 but was transferred to a hospital that summer in order to do surgery on a brain tumor.

He died on 22 October 2012 while on hospital arrest, after a six-day coma.

== See also ==
- Iranian reform movement
