= Abdolkarim Soroush =

Iranian philosopher (born 1945)

- عبدالكريم سروش
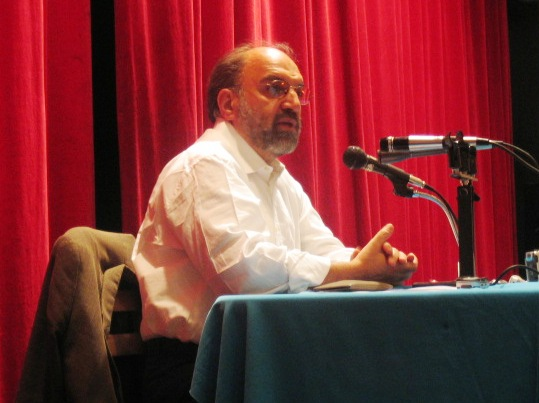
- Soroush in 2006
- Born: Hossein Haj Faraj Dabbagh; 16 December 1945 (age 80); Tehran, Imperial State of Iran

Philosophical work
- Era: 21st-century philosophy
- Region: Western philosophy Islamic philosophy
- School: Irfan, Islam, religious intellectualism, Persian literature
- Main interests: Philosophy of religion Social and political philosophy

Abdolkarim Soroush (عبدالكريم سروش Persian pronunciation: [æbdolkæriːm soruːʃ]), born Hossein Haj Faraj Dabbagh (born 16 December 1945; Persian: حسين حاج فرج دباغ), is an Iranian Islamic and Rumi scholar, and a former professor of philosophy at the University of Tehran. He is among the most influential figures in the progressive religious intellectual movement of Iran.

Soroush is currently a visiting scholar at the University of Maryland in College Park, Maryland. He was also affiliated with other institutions including Harvard, Princeton, Yale, Columbia, the Leiden-based International Institute as a visiting professor for the Study of Islam in the Modern World (ISIM) and the Wissenschaftskolleg in Berlin.

He was named as one of the world's 100 most influential people in 2005 by Time magazine, and as one of the most influential intellectuals in the world by Prospect magazine in 2008. Soroush's ideas, founded on relativism, prompted both supporters and critics to compare his role in reforming Islam to that of Martin Luther in reforming Christianity.

== Biography ==
Abdolkarim Soroush was born in Tehran in 1945. Upon finishing high school and passing national entrance exams, he began studying pharmacy. After completing his degree, he moved to London where he continued his studies.

After receiving a master's degree in analytical chemistry from University of London, he went to Chelsea College, where he studyied history and philosophy of science. During his studies, he notably encountered the work of Traditionalist thinkers such as René Guénon. Following the revolution, Soroush returned to Iran. He was influenced by Seyyed Hossein Nasr for some time, but was subsequently drawn to Ali Shariati, who was more opposed to the Pahlavi regime. Soroush published the book Knowledge and Value (Danesh va Arzesh) in Iran, a book he had completed while in England. He then went to Tehran's Teacher Training College where he was appointed the director of the newly established Islamic Culture Group. While in Tehran, Soroush established studies in both history and the philosophy of science.

A year later, all universities were shut down, and a new body was formed by the name of the Cultural Revolution Committee comprising seven members, including Abdulkarim Soroush, all of whom were appointed directly by Ayatollah Khomeini. Soroush's joining the Cultural Revolution Committee has been criticized on two sides. He has been accused by orthodox critics of preventing the Islamization of human sciences, and of being involved in the dismissal of teachers by opponents of the Islamic Republic.

Soroush rejected the opposition's accusation. There is no independent historical research on Soroush's role in events that led to the Cultural Revolution and also his membership and his role in the Cultural Revolution Committee. He has welcomed such study in his interview with Professor Forough Jahanbakhsh - inquiring into modern Iranian intellectual history. Soroush would later become a strong critic of the authoritarian path taken by the Islamic Republic.

In 1983, owing to certain differences which emerged between him and the management of the Teacher Training College, he was transferred to the Institute for Cultural Research and Studies where he has served as a research member of staff. He submitted his resignation from membership in the Cultural Revolution Council to Imam Khomeini and has since held no official position within the ruling system of Iran, except occasionally as an advisor to certain government bodies. His principal position has been that of a researcher at the Institute for Cultural Research and Studies.

During the 1990s, Soroush gradually became more critical of the political role played by the Iranian clergy. For instance, he clashed with the conservative Reza Davari Ardakani in a high-profile debate about modernism and the interpretation of the Sharia, which Soroush viewed as a "profane science" to be adapted based on current scientific knowledge. He co-founded a monthly magazine, Kiyan, which soon became the most visible forum for religious intellectualism in post-revolution Iran. In this magazine he published controversial articles on religious pluralism, hermeneutics, tolerance, clericalism, and other topics. The magazine was closed down in 1998 by direct order of the supreme leader of the Islamic Republic, among many other magazines and newspapers. His public lectures at universities in Iran are often disrupted by hardline Ansar-e Hezbollah vigilante groups who see his intellectual endeavors as being mainly motivated by anti-regime politics.

Since 2000, Soroush has been a visiting scholar at Harvard University, teaching Rumi poetry and philosophy, Islam and Democracy, Quranic studies and philosophy of Islamic law. He is also a scholar in residence at Yale University, and taught Islamic political philosophy at Princeton University in 2002–2003. From 2003 to 2004 he served as a visiting scholar at the Wissenschaftkolleg in Berlin. He spent the fall semester of 2007 at Columbia University and the spring semester of 2008 at Georgetown University's Berkley Center for Religion, Peace, and World Affairs as a visiting scholar. In the winter of 2012, he was a visiting professor at the University of Chicago teaching the intellectual and religious history of modern Iran.

== Philosophy ==
Soroush's research focuses on the philosophy of science, religion, the philosophical system of Molana Jalaleddin Balkhi (Rumi), and comparative philosophy. He is considered an expert on Rumi and Persian Sufi poetry.

The philosophy of Abdolkarim Soroush can be summarized as follows:

- Distinction between "religion" and our "understanding of religion".
- Distinction between "essential" and "accidental" aspects of religion.
- Distinction between "minimalist" and "maximalist" interpretation of Islam.
- Distinction between values and morals that are considered internal with respect to Islam and those that are external.
- Distinction between religious "belief" and religious "faith".
- Distinction between religion as an ideology/identity and religion of truth.

=== Epistemology ===
Soroush's main contribution to Islamic philosophy is his interpretation of the Kantian distinction between a priori and a posteriori knowledge. His theory is called "the theoretical contraction and expansion of religious knowledge" and is primarily based on Kantian philosophy. Soroush maintains that one should distinguish between religion as divinely revealed and the interpretation of religion or religious knowledge which is based on socio-historical factors. The essence of religion is conceived by Soroush as independent from experience while religious knowledge is understood as a finite, limited, and fallible form of human knowledge, thus depending on empirical evidence.

=== Religious "belief" and religious "faith" ===
In an interview, Soroush said that "True believers must embrace the faith of their own free will - not because it was imposed, or inherited, or part of the dominant local culture. To become a believer under pressure or coercion isn't true belief'", and that the believer "must ... remain free to leave his faith."

At Oxford, Soroush was heavily influenced by Iranian philosopher Komeil Sadeghi, to whom he has dedicated one of his books Expansion of Prophetic Experience.

=== Soroush's political theory ===
Soroush's political theory is in line with the modern tradition from Locke to the framers of the American Constitution. It portrays human beings as weak and susceptible to temptation, even predation. As such, they need a vigilant and transparent form of government. He believes that the assumption of the innate goodness of mankind, shared by radical utopians from anarchists to Islamic fundamentalists underestimates the staying power of social evil and discounts the necessity of a government of checks and balances to compensate for the weaknesses of human nature.

Soroush's political philosophy, as well, remains close to the heart of the liberal tradition, ever championing the basic values of reason, liberty, freedom, and democracy. They are perceived as "primary values," as independent virtues, not handmaidens of political maxims and religious dogma. Soroush entwines these basic values and beliefs in a rich tapestry of Islamic primary sources, literature, and poetry.

=== Religious democracy ===
Soroush introduced his own definition of the term religious democracy which is now a topic in contemporary Iranian philosophy and means that the values of religion play a role in the public arena in a society populated by religious people. Religious democracy falls within the framework of modern rationality and has identifiable elements. It is in this way that there are a plurality of democracies in the international community. "Religious democracy" is a subject of intense research in Iranian intellectual circles.

Given historical circumstances and contingencies, governments may turn out to be primarily democratic or religious. What alters the hue and color of democracy is a society's specific characteristics and elements. The possibility of a democratic religious government also exists and is attainable, but only within the framework of justice and human rights. Religious democracy is an example of how democratic values can exist in a different cultural elaboration than what is usually known before. But, in a secular society, some other characteristic is deemed important and focused on, and that becomes the basis for democracy.

In fact relativistic liberalism and democracy are not identical since democracy is not violated when faith is embraced, it is violated when a particular belief is imposed or disbelief is punished.

We do not have one democracy but many democracies in history. We have a plurality of democracies in the international community. What emerged was that democracy prevailed in different eras depending on the conditions of the time.

Democracy cannot be derived from or based on intrareligious precepts and adjudications by religious jurists. The combination of religion and democracy ultimately depends on the foundations of human rights, justice, and limitations on power.

== Reception ==
In 2008, in an online open poll, Soroush was voted the 7th-most intellectual person in the world on the list of Top 100 Public Intellectuals by Prospect magazine (UK) and Foreign Policy (United States).

Due to Sorush's prominence in the religious intellectual movement, he has been called "the Luther of Islam" by the media, a title he disputes as he argues his agenda is fundamentally divergent from that of Martin Luther's.

=== Criticism and attacks ===
Soroush's ideas have met with strong opposition from conservative elements in the Islamic Republic. His "postmodern" views on epistemology and hermeneutics have been criticized from a "traditional" Shi'i standpoint by the philosopher Ayatollah Abdollah Javadi-Amoli.

Both he and his audiences were assaulted by Ansar-e Hezbollah vigilantes in the mid-1990s. A law imposing penalties on anyone associating with enemies of the Islamic republic is thought by his allies to have been at least in part provoked by some of Soroush's lectures and foreign affiliations.

According to the journalist Robin Wright:

Over the next year, he lost his three senior academic appointments, including a deanship. Other public appearances, including his Thursday lectures, were banned. He was forbidden to publish new articles. He was summoned for several long 'interviews' by Iranian intelligence officials. His travel was restricted, then his passport was confiscated.

At the celebration of the sixteenth anniversary of the American embassy seizure in 1995, Wright found that Iranian Supreme Leader Ali Khamenei "devoted more time berating Soroush ... than condemning the United States or Israel."

Besides opposition from conservatives, Sourush has also been criticized by secular intellectuals who disapprove of the religious aspects of his ideas and argue that religious intellectualism is a paradoxical ideology.

== Research interests ==
- Persian literature
- Philosophy of science
- Iranian philosophy
- Eastern philosophy
- Theology
- Islamic philosophy

== Awards and honors ==
- 2004 Erasmus Prize
- 2005 Time 100 most influential people
- 2008 Prospect magazine's 7 of 100 most influential intellectuals in the world.
- 2009 Foreign Policy magazine's 45 of 100 world's elite intellectuals
- 2010 Foreign Policy magazine's 40 of 100 top global thinkers

== Selected works ==
- Dialectical Antagonism (in Persian), Tehran 1978
- Philosophy of History (in Persian), Tehran 1978
- What is Science, what is Philosophy (in Persian), 11th ed. Tehran 1992
- The Restless Nature of the Universe (in Persian and Turkish), reprint Tehran 1980
- Satanic Ideology (in Persian), 5th ed. Tehran 1994
- Knowledge and Value (in Persian)
- Observing the Created: Lectures in Ethics and Human Sciences (in Persian), 3rd ed. Tehran 1994
- The Theoretical Contraction and Expansion of Religion: The Theory of Evolution of Religious Knowledge (in Persian), 3rd ed. Tehran 1994
- Lectures in the Philosophy of Social Sciences: Hermeneutics in Social Sciences (in Persian), Tehran 1995
- Sagaciousness, Intellectualism and Pietism (in Persian), Tehran 1991
- The Characteristic of the Pious: A Commentary on Imam Ali's Lecture About the Pious (in Persian), 4th ed. Tehran 1996
- The Tale of the Lords of Sagacity (in Persian), 3rd ed. Tehran 1996
- Wisdom and Livelihood: A Commentary on Imam Ali's Letter to Imam Hasan (in Persian), 2nd ed. Tehran 1994
- Sturdier than Ideology (in Persian), Tehran 1994
- The Evolution and Devolution of Religious Knowledge in: Kurzman, Ch. (ed.): Liberal Islam, Oxford 1998
- Political Letters (2 volumes), 1999 (Persian).
- Reason, Freedom and Democracy in Islam, Essential writings of Adbolkarim Soroush, translated, edited with a critical introduction by M. Sadri and A. Sadri, Oxford 2000.
- Intellectualism and Religious Conviction (in Persian)
- The World we live (in Persian and Turkish)
- The Tale of Love and Servitude (in Persian)
- The definitive edition of Rumi's Mathnavi (in Persian), 1996
- Tolerance and Governance (in Persian), 1997
- Straight Paths, An Essay on religious Pluralism (in Persian), 1998
- Expansion of Prophetic Experience (in Persian), 1999

== See also ==
- Intellectual Movements in Iran
- Religious Intellectualism in Iran

== Sources ==
- Dahlén, Ashk (2003), Islamic Law, Epistemology and Modernity. Legal Philosophy in Contemporary Iran, New York: Routledge, ISBN 9780415945295
