= Moral syncretism =

Moral syncretism consists of the attempt to reconcile disparate or contradictory moral beliefs, often while melding the ethical practices of various schools of thought.

== The role of moral syncretism ==
The requirements of a global ethic call for "a minimal basic consensus relating to binding values, irrevocable standards and moral attitudes, which can be affirmed by all religions despite their undeniable dogmatic or theological differences and should also be supported by non-believers." It cannot, however, make the specific ethics of the different religions and philosophies around the world superfluous or obsolete, nor should it strive to do so.

Syncretism tends to facilitate coexistence and constructive interaction between different cultures (intercultural competence), a factor that has recommended it to rulers of multi-ethnic realms. Conversely the rejection of syncretism, usually in the name of "piety" and "orthodoxy," may help to generate, bolster or authorize a sense of cultural unity in a well-defined minority or majority. While strengthening the ethical identity of the subgroup, this is often detrimental to the unity of the whole.

== Morality independent of religion ==
A cornerstone of moral syncretism is that religion cannot be morality's only arbiter.

The Dalai Lama, for example, has said that compassion and affection are human values that are independent of religion: "We need these human values. I call these secular ethics, secular beliefs. There’s no relationship with any particular religion. Even without religion, even as nonbelievers, we have the capacity to promote these things."

This notion is also supported by the traditional Judeo-Christian concept of natural law. In his book On Law, Morality and Politics, Thomas Aquinas identifies the innate rational nature of humans as being what defines moral law: "The rule and measure of human acts is the reason, which is the first principle of human acts."

This does not, however, mean secular ethics and religion are mutually exclusive. In fact, many principles, such as the Golden Rule, are present in both systems, and some religious people, as well as some Deists, prefer to adopt a rational approach to ethics.

=== Atheism and morality ===
Most atheists argue that no religious basis is necessary for one to live an ethical life. They assert that atheists are as motivated towards moral behavior as anyone, or more, citing a range of non-theistic sources of moral behavior including: parental love, their conventional (or advanced) educated upbringing, natural empathy, compassion and the humane concern; respect for social norms, criminal law stemming from natural law, police or other enforced order (and in some cases society); and a desire for a good reputation and self-esteem. According to this view, ethical behavior is a natural consequence of altruistic motivation, not stemming from divine or tenet-prescribed system of punishment or reward in life and/or after death, though experiences and tentative expectations may instead play a role in forming and strengthening a moral atheist's motivations and ethics, united in rejection of any theory of all human beings' afterlife. Thus while atheism does not entail any particular moral philosophy, many atheists are drawn towards philosophies and worldviews such as: secular humanism, empiricism, objectivism, or utilitarianism, which provide a moral framework that is not founded on faith in deities.

=== Humanist ethics ===
Humanists endorse universal morality based on the commonality of human nature and the belief that knowledge of right and wrong is based on our understanding of individual and joint interests, rather than a system of ethics stemming from a transcendental or arbitrarily local source, rejecting faith completely as a basis for moral action. The humanist ethics goal is a search for viable individual, social and political principles of conduct, judging them on their ability to enhance human well-being and individual responsibility.

The International Humanist and Ethical Union (IHEU) is the worldwide umbrella organization for those adhering to the Humanist life stance. Member organisations and individual members are required to accept the following statement:

Humanism is a democratic and ethical life stance, which affirms that human beings have the right and responsibility to give meaning and shape to their own lives. It stands for the building of a more humane society through an ethic based on human and other natural values in the spirit of reason and free inquiry through human capabilities. It is not theistic, and it does not accept supernatural views of reality.

Humanism is also known to adopt principles of the Golden Rule. As Oscar Wilde once said, "Selfishness is not living as one wishes to live, it is asking others to live as one wishes to live." This emphasizes a respect for other people's identities and ideals.

=== School of Economic Science ===
The School of Economic Science (SES) is an organisation based in Mandeville Place, London, founded by Leon MacLaren in 1937. Originally constituted to facilitate the study of economics, over time it came to focus on philosophy, particularly the Hindu tradition of Advaita Vedanta. In North America, the SES is also known as the School of Practical Philosophy, or by other similar names. In Australia, it is known as the School of Philosophy. Although the SES has been highly criticized for its methodology and alleged motives, it purports to be a syncretic school of moral philosophy.

== Religions that incorporate moral syncretism ==
Several groups have taken on the challenge of establishing a world community through doctrine, faith and practice.

=== Unitarian Universalism ===
Unitarian Universalism is a theologically liberal religion characterized by its support of "a free and responsible search for truth and meaning." This principle permits Unitarian Universalists a wide range of beliefs and practices. Some communities even offer a class called "Building Your Own Theology."

Many Unitarian Universalists consider themselves humanists, while others hold Christian, Buddhist, Jewish, pagan, atheist, agnostic, pantheist, or other beliefs. Some choose to attach no particular theological label to their idiosyncratic combination of beliefs. Others consider themselves to be Unitarian Universalists in theology and seek moral orientation in the Unitarian Universalist Association's Seven Principles and Six Sources. This diversity of views is considered a strength, since the emphasis is placed on a common search for a meaningful existence, rather than an adherence to a particular doctrine.

=== Universal Sufism ===
The philosophy of Universal Sufism revolves around a unity of all people and religions, as well as the ability to find beauty in all things. It is a form of Sufism that does not exist within the traditional framework of Islam and was most likely influenced by Advaita philosophy. Universal Sufism is characterised by its respect (if not inclusion) for other devotional traditions and its disapproval of miracles.

It is mandated that Universal Sufis should strive to "realize and spread the knowledge of Unity, the religion of Love, and Wisdom, so that the biases and prejudices of faiths and beliefs may, of themselves, fall away, the human heart overflow with love, and all hatred caused by distinctions and differences be rooted out."

== See also ==
- Applied ethics
- Atheism and morality
- Ethics in politics and economics
- Comparative morality among cultures
- Meta-ethics
- Moral relativism
- Public morality
- Secular ethics
- World community
- World peace
