= Morteza Motahhari bibliography =

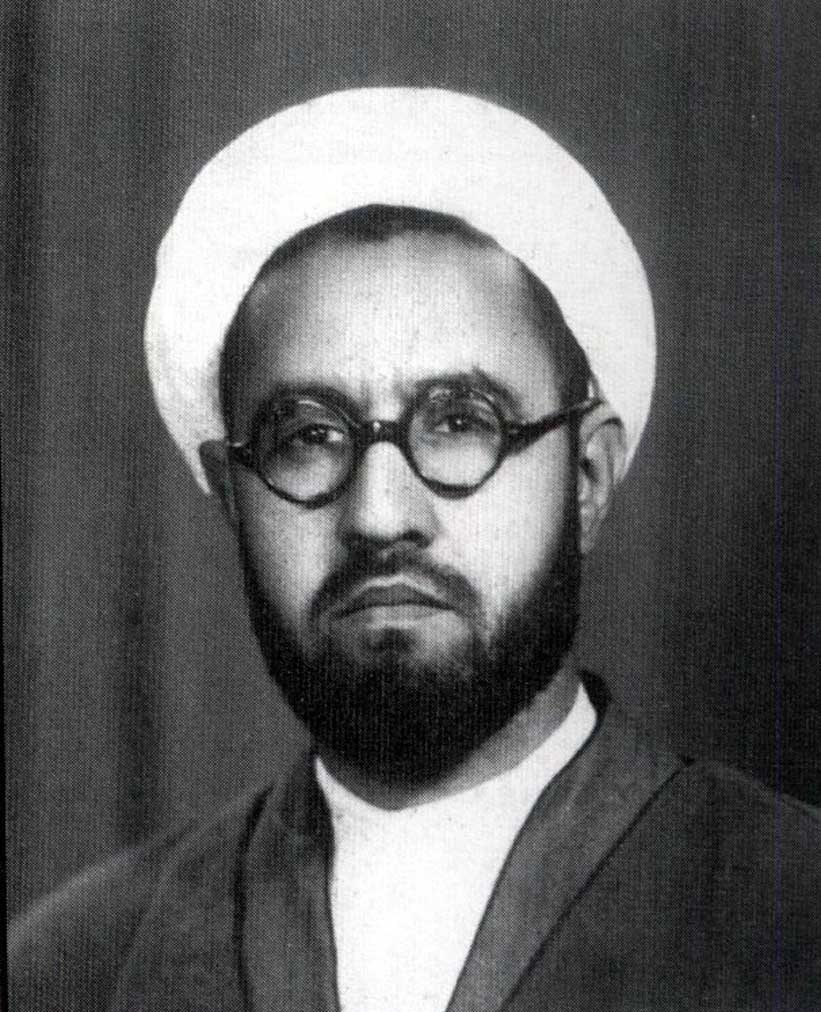
- Picture of Morteza Motahhari
- Books↙: 150

This is a bibliography of the works of Morteza Motahhari.

Morteza Motahhari (born 31 January 1919 in Fariman, Persia, assassinated 1 May 1979 (aged 60) in Tehran, Iran) was a Shiite cleric, professor of Islamic philosophy and theology, and commentator of Quran. He was a member of Islamic Coalition Party and one of the theorists of the Government of the Islamic Republic of Iran. Before the 1979 Iranian Revolution, he was a professor at the Faculty of Theology, University of Tehran. After the Revolution, he was appointed as the chairman of the Council of the Islamic Revolution. In the literature of the Islamic Republic of Iran, he is referred to as the "Martyr Teacher". He was one of the prominent thinkers and writers and had many works.

Most of the books attributed to him were his lectures and articles, which were collected and published as books after his assassination. In addition, the original language of these books is Persian.

== Biography of the elders ==
#	Title of the book	Original title	Year	Translation	Description	Citation
1	Anecdotes of Pious Men	داستان راستان	1960	English, Spanish, Japanese, Azerbaijani, Urdu, Bengali, Tajik, Russian, Arabic, French, Kurdish, Turkish	Includes 125 stories taken from books of hadith and books of rijal, chronicles books and biography works. The protagonists of the stories are often prominent religious leaders or great scientific and jurisprudential persons.	
2	The Attraction and Repulsion of Ali	جاذبه و دافعه علی (ع)	1970	English, Azerbaijani, Bengali, Thai	Polarization Around The character of Ali Ibn Abi Talib, A collection of four lectures given by Morteza Motahhari in Hosseiniyeh Ershad. About Imam Ali, the positive role of affection in the construction of the individual and society, the strong repulsion of the Imam and how he hardly rejected deviant beliefs and threw them away.	
3	A Journey through Nahj al-Balagha	سیری در نهج‌البلاغه	1973	English, Russian, Azerbaijani, Urdu, Turkish, Arabic	Glimpses of Nahjul-Balagha: Motahhari mentions how he got acquainted with Nahj al-Balagha which indicates a journey in this vast and boundless ocean of knowledge and spirituality.	
4	Husaynian Epic	حماسه حسینی	1984	Arabic, Urdu, Bengali, Russian	Lectures, writings and notes of Master Motahhari about the Battle of Karbala	
5	A Survey into the Lives of the Infallible Imams	سیری در سیره ائمه اطهار علیهم السلام	1988	English, Azerbaijani, Urdu, Arabic	Analysis of the life and socio-political life of some of The Fourteen Infallibles, especially in terms of the quality of dealing with the issue of Caliphate	
6	A Survey into the Live of the Islam Prophet	سیری در سیره نبوی	1985	English, Pashto, Azerbaijani, Bengali, French, Thai	Attitude And Conduct of Prophet Muhammad: A history of the life of the Islam Prophet Muhammad and also an analysis of some of his sayings.	
7	Biography of Amir al-Momenin Ali (AS)	سیره امیرالمومنین علی (ع)	2012	-	Motahhari's views about Imam Ali.	

== Ethics, education and mysticism ==
#	Title of the book	Original title	Year	Translation	Description	Citation
1	Hafez Mysticism	عرفان حافظ	1980	Albanian	A collection of five sessions of the conference of Professor Motahhari, which was presented around 1971 in the Faculty of Theology, University of Tehran. In the book, Motahhari, while introducing Hafez's mystical character, has also explained the principles of his mystical worldview.	
2	Spiritual Discourses	آزادی معنوی	1986	English, Arabic, Urdu, Spanish, French	Spiritual Sayings, consist of fifteen lectures by Morteza Motahhari that have been delivered at different times and places. The common aspect of all of these lectures is that their subject matter is spiritual and related to self-improvement and self-cultivation, although sometimes address social issues.	
3	Training and Education in Islam	تعلیم و تربیت در اسلام	1988	English, Spanish	Includes topics: nurturing intellect, human intellectual training, the issue of habit, moral act, self-respect in the Quran and hadith and the roots of moral inspiration, nurturing the body and nurturing intellectual talent, history of reason from the point of view of Muslims, factors of education.	
4	A Collection of 10 Essays	ده گفتار	1986	Urdu, Arabic	A total of ten lectures or articles that have been delivered or written by Motahhari during the years 1960 to 1962. Includes topics such as piety, Enjoining good and forbidding wrong, ijtihad, pathology of the religious community, the duty of science, leadership of the young generation, sermons and pulpits. Religious pathology is the main focus of the topics.	
5	Philosophy of Ethics	فلسفه اخلاق	1983	English, Urdu, Arabic	Consisting of twelve sessions of the thoughtful lecture of the professor Morteza Motahhari on "Philosophy of ethics".	
6	Perfect Man	انسان کامل	1988	English, Azerbaijani, Urdu, Spanish, Turkish, Bengali, Tajik, Russian	Consists of thirteen lectures given in 1974. In these lectures, Master Motahari, reveal that Islam is a comprehensive religion and the man of Islam is a multidimensional human being who carries out all the commands of this divine school in unison.	
7	Anthropology of the Quran	انسان‌شناسی قرآن	2013	-	Consisting of twelve sessions of lectures by Professor Motahhari on theology, cosmology and anthropology of the Quran.	
8	Discourses in Islamic Ethics	گفتارهایی در اخلاق اسلامی	2011	-	Talks about trust on God, consent and submission, patience and longings (parts of the moral system of Islam).	
9	Wisdoms and Advices	حکمت‌ها و اندرزها	1992	-	Two volumes: including articles by Professor Motahhari from 1952 to 1962 for a general program on acquaintance with Islamic culture. Most of its contents are about the way of life and the precepts of Islam in this regard.	
10	Nature and Education	فطرت و تربیت	2019	-	Training in the true sense of the word means developing one's inner talents. That is, we adapt ourselves to human beings, not adapt human beings to our own desires and intentions; Let us go and see what talents God Almighty has placed in the human body; Cultivate the same talents.	
11	A Collection of 20 Essays	بیست گفتار	1990	Urdu	Contains twenty lectures about correcting Muslims' beliefs on some Islamic teachings with novel tips and analyzes on doctrinal and social issues.	
12	Understanding Islamic Sciences (Theology, Mysticism, Practical wisdom)	آشنایى با علوم اسلامى (کلام ، عرفان ، حکمت عملى)	1979	English, Urdu, Spanish	2nd volume: acquaintance with mysticism and theology and practical wisdom from Islamic view of Motahhari.	
13	Mirror of the Cup: Hafez's Divan with the notes of Master Motahhari	آئینه جام: دیوان حافظ همراه با یادداشتهای استاد مطهری	1993	-	A collection of poems The Divān of Hafez with the notes of Master Motahhari.	
14	Divan of Hafez Shirazi	دیوان حافظ شیرازی	1995	-	A version of The Divān of Hafez written by Motahari taken from Mohammad Ghazvini and Dr. Qassem Ghani manuscripts.	
15	Enjoining Good and Forbidding Wrong	امر به معروف و نهی از منکر	2012	-	Motahhari’s thought in terms of Enjoining good and forbidding wrong.	
16	The Propaganda	تبلیغ	2012	-	Motahhari lectures on the subject of Islamic propaganda and its importance.	

== Social and political ==
#	Title of the book	Original title	Year	Translation	Description	Citation
1	The Future of the Islamic Revolution of Iran	آینده انقلاب اسلامی ایران	1983	-	Includes Motahhari’s last speeches after the victory of the Islamic Revolution, the last views of Motahhari on the basic issues of the revolution and what is necessary to explain, strengthen and grow in the future of the Islamic Revolution are expressed.	
2	Slavery in Islam	بردگی در اسلام	2014	-	History of slavery among the various nations of the world, causes and effects of slavery, the situation of slaves in the ancient world, slavery in Islam.	
3	Reviving Islamic Ethos	احیای تفکر اسلامی	2001	English, German, Arabic	It consists of five lectures by Master Motahhari, which were delivered in 1970 in Hosseiniyeh Ershad. Examine the roots of the stagnation of religious thought and examine key concepts and elements such as action, self-confidence, trust and asceticism in their true sense.	
4	Islamic Jihad	جهاد اسلامی	2017	-	About Islamic Jihad and freedom of belief in this regard.	
5	Five Articles	پنج مقاله	2011	-	It consists of five articles written by Motahhari, which have in common a general or specific view of Islam and the Qur'an: Salah, Religion and sect, Qur'anic needs, superior Islam, a critique of a translation of the Qur'an.	
6	Mahdi Uprising and Revolution	قیام و انقلاب مهدی (ع)	1978	Azerbaijani, Urdu, Turkish, Arabic, French	The issue of Mahdism has been discussed in comparison with the theories that have materially analyzed history. In the second part of the book, which is entitled "Martyr", the value of martyrdom and the sanctity and exaltation of the status of martyr has been studied from various aspects.	
7	Islamic Movements in the Last Hundred Years	نهضت‌های اسلامی در صد ساله اخیر	1987	Azerbaijani, Urdu	In this book, after discussing the Islamic movements of the last hundred years and their leaders, the general goals of all Islamic movements are stated. Also, the Islamic Movement of Iran has been introduced as the largest reform movement and the nature, purpose and leadership of the movement have been studied.	
8	An Introduction to Islamic Government	مقدمه‌ای بر حکومت اسلامی	2017	-	The collection of lectures is by the professor Morteza Motahhari about the Islamic government of Iran.	
9	Six Articles	شش مقاله	1984	-	Six articles on various topics by Morteza Motahhari: His views on the world and Islam.	
10	A Collection of 10 Essays	ده گفتار	1986	Urdu, Arabic	A total of ten lectures or articles that have been delivered or written by Motahhari during the years 1960 to 1962. Includes topics such as piety, Enjoining good and forbidding wrong, ijtihad, pathology of the religious community, the duty of science, leadership of the young generation, sermons and pulpits. Religious pathology is the main focus of the topics.	
11	A Collection of 20 Essays	بیست گفتار	1990	Urdu	Contains twenty lectures about correcting Muslims' beliefs on some Islamic teachings with novel tips and analyzes on doctrinal and social issues.	
12	Fifteen Speeches	پانزده گفتار	2001	-	A collection of fifteen lectures by Professor Motahhari on Islam and the needs of the world today, the Islamic liberation movement, the need to bow to Islamic rituals, the role of religion in historical developments and the role of Battle of Karbala in the evolution of Islamic history, the issue of misfortune superstition, the issue of Event of Ghadir Khumm, the issue of Palestine And the danger of Israel, Hypocrisy and its nature and means.	
13	Hajj	حج	2001	-	Excerpts from Master Motahhari's notes on Hajj.	
14	Society and History in the Quran	جامعه و تاریخ در قرآن	2017	-	A study of society and history from the perspective of the Qur'an and Islam.	
15	The Islamic Revolution from the Perspective of the Philosophy of History	انقلاب اسلامی از دیدگاه فلسفه تاریخ	2018	-	Five sessions of lesson of Motahhari in Faculty of Theology, University of Tehran in 1979, on the analysis of the nature of the Islamic Revolution and the relationship between Islam and the Revolution.	
16	The Battle of Right and Wrong	نبرد حق و باطل	1983	German, Spanish, French	In the first part, while raising the issue of right and wrong in the two realms of the world, society and history, the principles of historical materialism are criticized and the theory of Islam is presented in this regard. In the second part, first the concept of evolution and its difference with progress is expressed, then the future of mankind from the perspective of material schools such as Marxism and existentialism is examined and finally the theory of Islam in this regard is described.	
17	Quartet Dialogue	گفتگوی چهارجانبه	2011	-	The dialogue session of Motahhari, Ali Khamenei, Ali Shariati and Fakhreddin Hejazi, in which the issues presented well show the intellectual and cultural atmosphere of the society, especially students and intellectuals of that time, and introduce the reader atmosphere of the years close to the 1979 Iranian Revolution.	
18	Historical Letter of Master Motahhari to Imam Khomeini	نامه تاریخی استاد مطهری (ره) به امام خمینی (ره)	2001	-	Containing the letter by Professor Motahhari which was sent to Ruhollah Khomeini in 1977, about a year before the Islamic Revolution and when Khomeini was staying in Najaf, and it referred to the most important issues of the Islamic movement.	
19	Islam and the Issue of Nationality	اسلام و مسئله ملیت	1985	English	A study of the voluntary Muslimization of different ethnic groups in history.	
20	The Haman Social Complementarity	تکامل اجتماعی انسان	1984	English, German, Arabic	On the concept of human evolution and future from different perspectives and theories of the schools of Marxism and Existentialism and the school of Islam about optimism and pessimism about the future of mankind.	
21	Society and History	جامعه و تاریخ	1985	Spanish, French	Proving the Unfoundedness of Historical Materialism and Showing the Slips of Muslim Intellectuals in Analyzing the Movement of History and the Motivating Factors of History.	
22	About the Islamic Republic	پیرامون جمهوری اسلامی	1985	English, Spanish, Arabic	Articles about the Islamic Republic such as the role of women in the Islamic Republic, the duties of seminaries, the goals of the clergy in the struggle and ...	
23	The Holy War	جهاد	1985	English, Spanish, Bengali	About defense and other laws related to Islam.	
24	About the Islamic Revolution	پیرامون انقلاب اسلامی	1980	Arabic, French, Albanian	Islam and revolution, types of revolution, Islamic revolution or revolutionary Islam?, real revolution, issues of government, definition of government, necessity and necessity of government, right of sovereignty.	
25	Islamic Jihad and Freedom of Belief	جهاد اسلامی و آزادی عقیده	2015	-	Address the issue of jihad in more detail.	

== Principles of beliefs ==
#	Title of the book	Original title	Year	Translation	Description	Citation
1	Divine Justice	عدل الهی	1992	English, Arabic, Turkish	About the importance of the subject of justice and its meaning and concept, and of course the history of the issues raised in this case.	
2	Man and Faith	انسان و ایمان	1981	English, Azerbaijani, Spanish, Sinitic, Kurdish, Arabic, French	In the book, the realm of man has been studied in the realm of knowledge and desires in comparison with the animal, and the criterion of human privilege over the animal has been considered as science and faith.	
3	Monotheistic Conception of the World	جهان‌بینی توحیدی	1989	English, Azerbaijani, Arabic	Examines the explanation of monotheism and the doctrinal and practical requirements based on it.	
4	Revelation and Prophethood	وحی و نبوت	1989	English, Azerbaijani, Spanish	A study of the historical role of the prophets and the purpose of the prophecies and revelations.	
5	Man in the Quran	انسان در قرآن	1989	English, Azerbaijani, Spanish, Turkish, Bengali	The Human Being In the Quran: Introduces the Quranic man, a multidimensional man who is full of spiritual attractions such as science and knowledge, moral goodness and so on.	
6	Society and History	جامعه و تاریخ	1981	English, Azerbaijani, Arabic	Social And Historical Change: An Islamic Perspective; Islamic worldview Islam's attitude towards society and history: The type of knowledge of a school about society and history and the way it is perceived from these two play a decisive role in the ideology of that school.	
7	Eternal Life or Life After Death	زندگی جاوید یا حیات اخروی	1979	English, Azerbaijani, Spanish, Turkish, Turkmen, Arabic	Eternal Life: Life After Death; Examining the way of knowing God, the way of knowing the world and the way of knowing the soul of man as various ways of believing in eternal life, examining the issue of the originality of the soul and the survival of the soul after death and life after death.	
8	Master And Mastership	ولاء ها و ولایت‌ها	1990	English, Urdu, Spanish, Turkish, Arabic	Wilayah, the Station of the Master; Master and mastership has been studied and analyzed from various dimensions and aspects (in general and special).	
9	The Unschooled Prophet	پیامبر امی	1968	English, Bengali, Arabic, French	The fact that the Prophet of Islam is unschooled is one of the definite facts of history which is also mentioned in the Quran. In this book, Master Motahhari has enumerated the interpretation of the word "Ummi" (unschooled in Arabic) from the point of view of Islamic commentators and has expressed the correct interpretation by quoting verses from the Quran.	
10	Notes of Master Motahhari on the works of Dr. Shariati	حاشیه‌های استاد مطهری بر آثار دکتر شریعتی	1999	-	This book contains the notes that Master Motahhari has written on some of the works of Ali Shariati, which mainly includes the scientific critique of the views contained in his books.	
11	The Prophecy	نبوت	2009	-	A study of prophecy with consideration of new ideas in humanities.	
12	God in Human Thought	خدا در اندیشه انسان	2014	-	Five lecture sessions in 1975, about the knowledge of God and the origin of God's thought in human beings according to the doubts raised by materialist scientists, which also discussed the criticize ability of the human mind.	
13	Tendency Excessive With The Materialism	علل گرایش به مادیگری	1993	English, Albanian, Arabic	The main subject of this book is to prove or disprove God and along with it, the causes and factors of the tendency towards materialism.	
14	The End of Prophecy	ختم نبوت	1990	Urdu, Spanish, Bengali, Arabic	It is a theological, philosophical and mystical approach to the prophethood of Prophet Muhammad.	
15	The Oneness	توحید	1994	Arabic	Seventeen sessions of Morteza Motahari's lecture on "Tawhid".	
16	Imamate and Leadership	امامت و رهبری	1985	English, Urdu, Russian	Discussing the issue of Imamate and Caliphate and answering its doubts.	
17	Digression of the Faith and Digression of the Action	گریز از ایمان و گریز از عمل	2015	-	Seven sessions of Motahari's lecture have dealt with the issue of faith and action from a new perspective and have explained the digression of faith that are more common in the European world and the digression of practice and action that are more common in the Islamic world.	
18	Goal of Life	هدف زندگی	2011	English, Albanian, Urdu, Spanish	Five sessions of Motahari's lecture in 1972 about the purpose of life and the purpose of creation.	
19	Seal of the Prophets	خاتمیت	1987	Russian	Why did the prophecy end? Who is the prophet? What does "messenger" mean? Are they different? What is the burning of Islamic teachings? According to the end of the prophecy, what is the need for the existence of the Infallible Imams?	
20	The Resurrection	معاد	1996	-	Includes ten sessions of lectures by Professor Motahhari on the study of popular theories about the resurrection.	
21	Man And His Destiny	انسان و سرنوشت	1988	English, Italian, Urdu, German, Arabic	The human being and his destiny: Morteza Motahhari has comparatively studied the issue of Predestination, Free will determinism and authority in different philosophical schools and the school of Islam.	
22	God in Human Life	خدا در زندگی انسان	1983	-	Six lectures by Professor Motahhari in 1975 about practical monotheism.	
23	Understanding Islamic Sciences (theology, mysticism, practical wisdom)	آشنایى با علوم اسلامى (کلام ، عرفان ، حکمت عملى)	1979	English, Urdu, Spanish, Arabic	2nd volume: acquaintance with mysticism and theology and practical wisdom from Islamic view of Motahhari.	
24	Divine intervention in human life	امداد های غیبی در زندگی بشر	1995	Urdu, Arabic	The difference between Divine Thought and Material Thought, the subject of the future of the world, and Islam's optimistic view of humanity's future, contrary to the pessimistic Material view.	
25	Right and Wrong	حق و باطل	1990	German, Spanish, French	Speeches of Morteza Motahhari about right and wrong according to the philosophy of history and Islamic thought.	
26	A Collection of 20 Essays	بیست گفتار	1990	Urdu	Contains twenty lectures about correcting Muslims' beliefs on some Islamic teachings with novel tips and analyzes on doctrinal and social issues.	
27	Man's Natural Disposition (fitrah)	فطرت	1990	English, Urdu, Arabic	Fitra in the words of Master Motahhari, "the mother of problems" of Islamic teachings and is therefore of extraordinary importance. In this book, Master Motahhari first clarifies the meaning of "Innate Nature or Fitra" and its difference with "instinct" and "nature". How to get innate information, justification of sacred and human tendencies, evolution of human origins, basis and origin of religion and critique of various theories are other topics.	
28	Religion is from Innate Nature	فطری بودن دین	2019	-	There is an innate talent and desire in human beings in the field of religious tendencies. But how this latent desire and stimulus flows depends on how it is guided.	
29	Innate Nature in the Quran	فطرت در قرآن	2011	-	About Fitra from Quranic view of Islam.	
30	An Introduction to the Islamic World View	مقدمه‌ای بر جهان بینی اسلامی	1988	English, Azerbaijani, German, Urdu, Spanish, Arabic, French, Kurdish	Includes Motahhari's last six writings on the Islamic worldview	
31	Jihad, The Holy War of Islam and Its Legitimacy in the Quran	جهاد و موارد مشروعیت آن در قرآن	1980	English	About legitimacy of Jihad, Islam and Peace, Defense vs. aggression, and human rights.	
32	The Battle of Right and Wrong	نبرد حق و باطل	1983	German, Spanish, French, Tajik	In the first part, while raising the issue of right and wrong in the two realms of the world, society and history, the principles of historical materialism are criticized and the theory of Islam is presented in this regard. In the second part, first the concept of evolution and its difference with progress is expressed, then the future of mankind from the perspective of material schools such as Marxism and existentialism is examined and finally the theory of Islam in this regard is described.	
33	An Introduction to the New Kalam	مقدمه‌ای بر کلام جدید	2020	-	Eleven sessions of the new theology course (Kalam) of the professor Motahhari in 1976 in the Faculty of Theology, University of Tehran.	

== Philosophy ==
#	Title of the book	Original title	Year	Translation	Description	Citation
1	Description of the Manzoumeh	شرح منظومه	1981	Arabic	Description of Hadi Sabzavari's Poetry work by Motahhari.	
2	Philosophical Articles	مقالات فلسفی	1994	German, Arabic	Master Motahhari's articles on philosophy and Islam.	
3	Four Journeys Lessons	درس‌های اسفار	1987	-	Six volumes: Description of Islamic philosophy work of Mulla Sadra named The Transcendent Philosophy of the Four Journeys of the Intellect by Motahhari.	
4	A Critique of Marxism	نقدی بر مارکسیسم	1984	-	About forty-five sessions of Motahari's discussion on the philosophy of Marxism in 1976-77.	
5	The Issue of Profound Knowledge	مساله شناخت	1988	English, Indonesian	Consists of ten sessions of Motahari's lecture which, according to the prevalence of Marxist thought at that time, was a kind of answer to the urgent intellectual need of that time, although the issue of cognition and profound knowledge is always important for human beings and is the basis of worldview.	
6	The Principles of Philosophy and the Method of Realism	اصول فلسفه و روش رئالیسم	1953	English, Arabic	Containing 14 articles by Muhammad Husayn Tabatabai on Islamic philosophy and Epistemology which has been published in 5 volumes with comprehensive explanations and footnotes by Morteza Motahhari.	
7	Understanding Islamic Sciences (logic, philosophy)	آشنائى با علوم اسلامى (منطق، فلسفه)	1979	English, Urdu, Arabic	1st volume: about general meaning of logic and philosophy, also consider Islamic view.	
8	The Profound Knowledge from View of the Quran	شناخت از نظر قرآن	1982	-	Analysis of the issue of profound knowledge and cognition from the perspective of the Qur'an.	
9	Detailed Description of the Manzoumeh	شرح مبسوط منظومه	1981	-	Two volumes: Organized text of lessons of the book "Manzoumeh", Hadi Sabzavari's Poetry work, by Motahhari.	
10	Isharat and Nijat Lessons	درس‌های اشارات و نجات	2006	-	Includes the lessons of Professor Motahari from the books "Isharat" and "Nijat" of Avicenna in the Faculty of Theology, University of Tehran for students of philosophy.	
11	Comments on Four Journeys	التعلیقه علی الاسفار الاربعه	2019	Written in Arabic and its introduction is Persian	It includes the comments of Master Motahhari on work of Mulla Sadra named The Transcendent Philosophy of the Four Journeys of the Intellect, written in Arabic and is a valuable research work for those interested in the field of Islamic philosophy and wisdom.	
12	The Healing Theology Lessons	درسهای الهیات شفا	2020	-	Two volumes: lessons of The Book of Healing by Motahhari.	

== Jurisprudence and law ==
#	Title of the book	Original title	Year	Translation	Description	Citation
1	On the Islamic Hijab	مسئله حجاب	1992	English, Azerbaijani, Urdu, Turkish, Bengali, Russian, Arabic, French, Tajik	History of Hijab in Judaism, Ancient Iran, Arab Ignorance and India. The reason for finding hijab among different tribes and nations and various theories in this regard; Philosophy of covering in Islam from different dimensions and aspects; And examining the objections that are taken on the principle of hijab and covering by the opponents of hijab.	
2	Master's Answers to Criticisms on the Book "On the Islamic Hijab"	پاسخ‌های استاد به نقدهایی بر کتاب مسئله حجاب	1989	-	It includes critiques of the book "On the Islamic Hijab" and the Motahhari’s answers to those critiques. The text of this book reveals Motahhari's jurisprudential method and shows how Motahhari fights against the colonial thesis "Islam minus the clergy".	
3	The System of Women's Rights in Islam	نظام حقوق زن در اسلام	1974	English, German, Urdu, Spanish, Chinese, Japanese, Arabic, French	The Rights of woman In Islam; The articles written by Professor Motahhari during the years 1966-67, related to family rights and women's rights in the school of Islam, the study of issues such as courtship, temporary marriage, women and economic independence, Islam and modernity, the status of women in the Quran.	
4	Sexual Ethics in Islam and in the Western World	اخلاق جنسی در اسلام و جهان غرب	1982	English, Urdu, Spanish, Turkish, Arabic, French	Examines the discussion of "sexual ethics" in its various dimensions in Western schools, then criticizes these theories, expresses the view of the Islamic school and advantages of it over the Western view, which promotes the human personality and the growth of secure side of family and society.	
5	Understanding Islamic Sciences (Principles of jurisprudence - jurisprudence)	آشنایی با علوم اسلامی (اصول فقه - فقه)	1979	English, Urdu, Arabic	3rd volume: Understanding Islamic Sciences (Principles of jurisprudence - jurisprudence).	
6	Six Articles	شش مقاله	1984	-	Six articles on various topics by Morteza Motahhari: His views on the world and Islam.	
7	A Collection of 10 Essays	ده گفتار	1986	Urdu, Arabic	A total of ten lectures or articles that have been delivered or written by Motahhari during the years 1960 to 1962. Includes topics such as piety, Enjoining good and forbidding wrong, ijtihad, pathology of the religious community, the duty of science, leadership of the young generation, sermons and pulpits. Religious pathology is the main focus of the topics.	
8	Islamic Jihad	جهاد اسلامی	2017	-	About Islamic Jihad and freedom of belief in this regard.	
9	The Issue of Usury and Banking	مساله ربا و بانک	1989	-	Discussions on usury, banking and insurance, economic issues and Islamic theory in this regard.	
10	Women and Judicial and Political Issues	زن و مسائل قضایی و سیاسی	2012	-	It has three sections: woman and martyrdom, woman and judgment and Fatwa, woman and politics.	
11	A View of the Islamic Economic System	نظری به نظام اقتصادی اسلام	1991	Urdu, Arabic	Critique and study the two schools of capitalism and socialism and outline their weaknesses, present the economic perspective of the school of Islam through accuracy and reflection on verses and hadiths.	
12	Islam and the Requirements of the Time	اسلام و مقتضیات زمان	1983	Azerbaijani, Arabic, Indonesian	A total of twenty-six lectures by Master Motahhari on the relativity of etiquette and the relativity of justice and the relativity of morality, as well as the accompanying rule, the refining factors of Islamic thought, the issue of abrogation and finality, the reason for changing the requirements of the times.	
13	Islam and the Needs of the Time	اسلام و نیازهای زمان	1994	Azerbaijani, Arabic	2nd volume of the book "Islam and the Requirements of the Time". How Islamic laws are adapted to different time conditions. The text of the book reveals the jurisprudential Motahhari’s view in this regard, and especially its coordination with the views of Ruhollah Khomeini.	
14	Fifteen Speeches	پانزده گفتار	2001	-	A collection of fifteen lectures by Professor Motahhari on Islam and the needs of the world today, the Islamic liberation movement, the need to bow to Islamic rituals, the role of religion in historical developments and the role of Battle of Karbala in the evolution of Islamic history, the issue of misfortune superstition, the issue of Event of Ghadir Khumm, the issue of Palestine And the danger of Israel, Hypocrisy and its nature and means.	
15	Family and Sexual Morality	خانواده و اخلاق جنسی	2020	-	About the role of men and women in the family and other related issues.	
16	Islamic Family System	نظام خانوادگی اسلام	2020	-	In this book, the family community is compared with the civil society and according to the characteristics of each, the type of rights and duties of the members of these two communities are discussed.	

== History ==
#	Title of the book	Original title	Year	Translation	Description	Citation
1	The Reciprocal Services Between Islam and Iran	خدمات متقابل اسلام و ایران	1973	English, Urdu, Arabic, Bengali	Selections From The Reciprocal Services Between Islam And Iran, nine lectures by Professor Motahhari in Hosseiniyeh Ershad, in three sections: Islam in terms of Iranian nationality, Islamic services to Iran, and Iranian services to Islam.	
2	Philosophy of History	فلسفه تاریخ	1990	-	Four volumes: Motahhari class text on "Philosophy of History". The method of the lesson was that a book on the subject was introduced and the students gave conferences on the different chapters of the book, respectively, and the professor Motahhari said comments during or after the conference.	
3	The Battle of Right and Wrong	نبرد حق و باطل	1983	German, Spanish, French, Tajik	In the first part, while raising the issue of right and wrong in the two realms of the world, society and history, the principles of historical materialism are criticized and the theory of Islam is presented in this regard. In the second part, first the concept of evolution and its difference with progress is expressed, then the future of mankind from the perspective of material schools such as Marxism and existentialism is examined and finally the theory of Islam in this regard is described.	
4	The Islamic Revolution from the Perspective of the Philosophy of History	انقلاب اسلامی از دیدگاه فلسفه تاریخ	2018	-	Five sessions of lesson of Motahhari in Faculty of Theology, University of Tehran in 1979, on the analysis of the nature of the Islamic Revolution and the relationship between Islam and the Revolution.	
5	Mahdi Uprising and Revolution	قیام و انقلاب مهدی (ع)	1978	Azerbaijani, Urdu, Turkish, Arabic, French	The issue of Mahdism has been discussed in comparison with the theories that have materially analyzed history. In the second part of the book, which is entitled "Martyr", the value of martyrdom and the sanctity and exaltation of the status of martyr has been studied from various aspects.	
6	The Decline and Progress of Civilizations	انحطاط و ترقی تمدن‌ها	2018	-	Eleven lectures by Motahhari in 1974. The main topic of these meetings is the philosophy of history, during which the issue of the decline and progress of civilizations is discussed in two parts: one in terms of the Qur'an and the other in terms of dialectical logic.	

== Economy ==
#	Title of the book	Original title	Year	Translation	Description	Citation
1	The Issue of Usury and Banking	مساله ربا و بانک	1989	-	Discussions on usury, banking and insurance, economic issues and Islamic theory in this regard.	
2	A View of the Islamic Economic System	نظری به نظام اقتصادی اسلام	1991	Urdu, Arabic	Critique and study the two schools of capitalism and socialism and outline their weaknesses, present the economic perspective of the school of Islam through accuracy and reflection on verses and hadiths.	
3	Introduction to Comparative Economics	مقدمه‌اى بر اقتصاد تطبيقى	2020	-	Includes the topics that have been lectured during 27 sessions by the professor Motahari and a number of economists from August 1978 to April 1979.	

== Exegesis of the Quran ==
#	Title of the book	Original title	Year	Translation	Description	Citation
1	Understanding the Quran	آشنایی با قرآن	2008	English, Urdu, Turkish, Bengali, Arabic	Fourteen volumes: The series of discussions on the interpretation of the Quran given by Motahhari between the years 1971 to 1978.	

== Notes ==
#	Title of the book	Original title	Year	Translation	Description	Citation
1	Notes of Master Motahhari	یادداشت‌های استاد مطهری	1999	-	Fifteen volumes: Alphabetical list of notes of Master Motahhari. Includes Motahhari notes during his student days, pre-lecture notes, his diary notes on various topics, and reference notes.	

== Collections ==
#	Title of the book	Original title	Year	Translation	Description	Citation
1	Collection of Works of Martyred Master Motahhari	مجموعه آثار استاد شهید مطهری	1989	Urdu	Thirty-two volumes: Includes a collection of writings and text of the speeches of Morteza Motahari, which the Council for Supervision of the Publication of his works, since 1989, has begun to prepare and compile them.	

== Excerpts ==
#	Title of the book	Original title	Year	Translation	Description	Citation
1	Islam and Iran (excerpt from the book "The Reciprocal Services Between Islam and Iran")	اسلام و ایران (گزیده از کتاب خدمات متقابل اسلام و ایران)	2011	-	Due to the large volume of the book "The Reciprocal Services Between Islam and Iran" and the specialization of many parts of it on the one hand and the issue of the relationship between Islam and Iran in recent years on the other hand, it was necessary to create a selection of this book for those interested in these topics.	
2	The Life of Prophet Mohammad and Aphorism	زندگانی حضرت محمد (ص) و کلمات قصار	2013	-	Part of the book "A Survey into the Live of the Islam Prophet" by Morteza Motahhari, which deals with the life of the Islam Prophet, and at the end, aphorisms of him.	
3	Hadith of Ghadir and the Issue of Imamate	حدیث غدیر و مسئله امامت	2010	-	Taken from the books of "Fifteen Speeches" and "Imamate and Leadership".	
4	Peace of Imam Hassan (AS)	صلح امام حسن (ع)	2011	-	About Hasan–Muawiya treaty, taken from the book of "A Survey into the Lives of the Infallible Imams" by Morteza Motahhari.	
5	Imam Reza, Succession of Mamun	ولایتعهدی امام رضا (ع)	2011	-	Taken from the book of "A Survey into the Lives of the Infallible Imams" by Morteza Motahhari.	
6	The Element of Propaganda in the Hosseini Movement	عنصر تبلیغ در نهضت حسینی	2012	-	Seven sessions of Motahari's lecture entitled "The Element of Propaganda in the Hosseini Movement".	
7	The Element of Enjoining Good and Forbidding Wrong in the Hosseini Movement	عنصر امر به معروف و نهی از منکر در نهضت حسینی	1982	Azerbaijani	Chapter 6 of the book "Husaynian Epic". Investigating the Karbala incident in terms of Enjoining good and forbidding wrong.	
8	Distortions in the Historical Event of Karbala	تحریفات در واقعه تاریخی کربلا	2012	-	Four lectures by Morteza Motahari on the danger of distortion, types of distortions and examples of distortions that have occurred about the Battle of Karbala throughout history.	
9	Analysis of the Ashura Event	تحلیل واقعه عاشورا	2012	-	Chapter 4 of the book "Husaynian Epic".	
10	The Repentance	توبه	2012	-	Includes two lectures by the professor Motahari on "Repentance" which was delivered in 1970, Hosseiniyeh Ershad, Tehran.	
11	The Worship and the Prayer	عبادت و دعا	2012	-	Includes four lectures by the professor Motahari on "Worship and Prayer" which was delivered in 1970, Hosseiniyeh Ershad, Tehran.	
12	Imam Sadegh (AS)	امام صادق (ع)	2012	-	Three lectures by Motahhari about Ja'far al-Sadiq.	
13	The Main Problem in the Clergy Organization	مشکل اساسی در سازمان روحانیت	2012	-	One of the topics in the book "A Collection of 10 Essays" by Morteza Motahhari.	
14	The Promised Mahdi	مهدی موعود	2012	-	Two lectures by the professor Motahhari about Muhammad al-Mahdi.	
15	Guiding the Youth Of The New Generation	رهبری نسل جوان	1982	English, Indonesian	Two lectures from the book "A Collection of 10 Essays" by Morteza Motahhari.	
16	Justice according to Ali (AS)	عدالت از نظر علی (ع)	2018	-	Two lectures from the book "A Collection of 20 Essays" by Morteza Motahhari.	
17	Islam and the Needs of the World Today	اسلام و نیازهای جهان امروز	1982	-	Two lectures from the book "Fifteen Speeches" by Morteza Motahhari.	
18	The Truth About Al-Husayn’s Revolt	ماهیت قیام حسینی	2008	English	The Nature of Imam Hassein’s Movement, investigating the three effective factors in the uprising of Imam Hussein, namely, refusing allegiance, inviting the people of Kufa and Enjoining good and forbidding wrong.	
19	The Divine Worldview and the Material Worldview	جهان‌بینی الهی و جهان‌بینی مادی	2015	-	An article by Motahhari, which was written around 1971. The "divine worldview" and the "material worldview" and the real principles and foundations of these two worldviews are explained and examines the real face of the divine worldview that can be the basis of an ideology.	
20	The Element of Epic in Hosseini Movement	عنصر حماسه در نهضت حسینی	2015	-	Chapter 1 of the book "Husaynian Epic". Includes three lectures by Motahhari around 1968 describing the Karbala incident.	
21	Exegesis of the Qadr Surah	تفسیر سوره قدر	2019	-	Part of the book "Understanding the Quran", Volume 14, Motahhari’s lectures on exegesis of Al-Qadr (surah).	
22	Problems of Ali PBUH	مشکلات علی علیه‌السلام	2018	-	Taken from the book of "A Survey into the Lives of the Infallible Imams" by Morteza Motahhari. About the various dimensions of the personality of Imam Ali and the manner in which he dealt with the enemies of truth and justice.	
23	Causes of Imam Hussein Uprising	علل قیام امام حسین (ع)	2006	Azerbaijani, Russian	The causes of the uprising of Imam Hussein (AS) are examined and during it the events related to this uprising and the greatness of the Karbala uprising are explained.	
24	The Martyr	شهید	1979	English, Azerbaijani, Urdu, Spanish, Bengali, Arabic	A study of war and martyrdom from the perspective of Islam, Imams and Quran.	
25	The Great Prophet, the Statue of Values	پیامبر اعظم، تندیس ارزشها	2008	-	Motahhari with an analytical approach and in order to identify the attributes and ethics of the Islam Prophet and his behavioral logic in various areas of life has reflected on ancient texts and explained some of the secrets of the prophetic personality.	
26	One Hundred Speeches: Summary of the Works of Shahid Motahhari	صد گفتار: خلاصه آثار شهید مطهری	2001	French	A summary of Master Motahhari's books.	
27	Ashura Slogans	شعارهای عاشورا	2008	-	Excerpts from "Husaynian Epic" book.	

== Related ==
#	Title of the book	Original title	Year	Compiler	Description	Citation
1	The Vigilant Peacemaker	مصلح بیدار	1999	Mohammad Hossein Vaseghi Raad	Collection of interviews, articles, lectures, etc. about the life and personality of Martyr Motahhari.	
2	Master Motahhari from the Point of View of the Family	استاد مطهری از نگاه خانواده	2009	Council for Supervising the Publication of the Works of Master Motahhari	A collection of interviews with members of the family of Master Motahari and contains novel and instructive points that draw a corner of the personality of that wise master.	
3	The Treasure of the Memory	گنج خاطره	2017	Ali Hojjati	A collection of memoirs of friends, companions, classmates, students, family members, etc. from Master Motahhari.	
4	Islamic Unity in the Works of Martyr Ayatollah Motahhari	اتحاد اسلامی در آثار شهید آیت الله مطهری	2007	Hamid Javid Mousavi	A study of Master Motahhari's works in terms of the subject of Islamic unity and their categorization in a logical way.	
5	A Piece of the Sun	پاره‌ای از خورشید	1998	Amirreza Sotoudeh, Hamid Reza Seyed Naseri	Introducing a corner of Motahhari's life and memories about him.	
6	My Memories of Master Shahid Motahhari	خاطرات من از استاد شهید مطهری	1996	Ali Davani	Includes Ali Davani's memoirs of Morteza Motahhari, which show aspects of Motahhari’s life, scientific and practical struggle, and behavioral characteristics.	
7	Principles and Jurisprudential Innovations of Martyr Ayatollah Motahhari	مبانی و نوآوری‌های فقهی شهید آیت الله مطهری	2009	Amrullah Hosseini Momenzadeh	Comprehensive study in various works of Master Motahhari, extracting his jurisprudential method.	
8	Professor Motahhari and Intellectuals	استاد مطهری و روشنفکران	1994	Akbar Rahmati	Contains selected topics from the works of Master Motahhari regarding the critique of the ideas of Muslim intellectuals.	
9	The Image of the Master in the Mirror of the Gaze of the Companions	سیمای استاد در آیینه ی نگاه یاران	1992	Hamid Javid Mousavi	Includes parts of Ruhollah Khomeini's messages in different years on the occasion of Motahhari’s martyrdom. And what other great people have to say about Master.	
10	The Letters and The Unspoken	نامه‌ها و ناگفته‌ها	2003	Council for Supervising the Publication of the Works of Master Motahhari	A collection of letters from the characters to Master Motahhari and letters and special notes from the master.	
11	Who was Motahhari?	مطهری که بود؟	2008	Hamid Javid Mousavi	Several lectures by some prominent scholars on the personality, works and thoughts of Master Motahhari.	
12	A Look at the Life of Master Motahhari	سیری در زندگانی استاد مطهری	1991	Akbar Hashemi Rafsanjani	A study of many aspects of Master Motahhari's life, especially his political struggles.	
13	The Sweet Story	نَقل و نُقل	2018	Mohammad Saeed Madani	Includes a large part of the stories, jokes, subtleties and allusions that Morteza Motahari has used in his works.	
14	Hypocrisy and Hypocrite from the Perspective of Martyr Ayatollah Motahhari	نفاق و منافق از دیدگاه شهید آیت الله مطهری	2013	Zahra Ashian, Fereshteh Eslami	Professor Motahhari says that if they want to evaluate our age, regardless of the industrial aspects, etc., only from a human point of view, they should say the age of hypocrisy. Mankind has all the ability to turn facts upside down.	
15	Freedom according to Master Motahhari	آزادی به روایت استاد مطهری	2018	Mohammad Kokab	Studied the issue of freedom from the perspective of Morteza Motahhari.	
16	Master in the Words of the Leader	استاد در کلام رهبر	2006	Ali Khamenei, Mojtaba Pirhadi	collection of Ali Khamenei's speeches that describes Master Motahari, which contains interesting points about the intellectual personality and life of the master.	
17	In the Mourning of the Master (collection of poems)	در رثای استاد (مجموعه اشعار)	1990	A group of poets	Poems by some poets in praise of Motahhari.	
18	Enjoining Good and Forbidding Wrong in the Master Motahhari’s Works	امر به معروف و نهی از منکر در آثار استاد مطهری	2008	Hossein Javadinia	Thematic study of Enjoining good and forbidding wrong in Motahhari's works.	
19	Overview of the Works of Master Motahhari	معرفی اجمالی آثار استاد مطهری	2003	Council for Supervising the Publication of the Works of Master Motahhari	After a brief description of the biography of Morteza Motahhari, the opinions of several scholars about him have been expressed. The next part of the book is dedicated to a brief introduction to the written works of Shahid Motahari. It has been translated into Arabic too.	
20	The Martyred Sheikh	شیخ شهید	1996	Council for Supervising the Publication of the Works of Master Motahhari	An illustrated collection of the life of Morteza Motahhari and includes a number of his letters and notes, as well as memorable photographs of Master and his companions, as well as letters from Imam Khomeini and his father to him.	
21	Justice according to Master Motahhari	عدالت به روایت استاد مطهری	2018	Mohammad Kokab	Various dimensions and aspects of the issue of justice and its relationship with key concepts from the special point of view of Professor Motahari.	
22	Ethics according to Master Motahhari	اخلاق به روایت استاد مطهری	2019	Mohammad Kokab	Presenting the moral issues in view of Master Motahhari in his works categorized in two sections: "Philosophy of Ethics" and "Science of Ethics".	
23	Some Glows of the Martyred Sheikh	لمعاتی از شیخ شهید	1991	Abbas Akhavein	Illustrated biography of Morteza Motahhari.	
24	A Discussion About Authority and Clergy	بحثی درباره مرجعیت و روحانیت	1962	A group of scholars	A collection of articles by a number of Muslim thinkers, including three articles by the professor Motahhari to explain the various aspects and dimensions of the subject of authority in the Shiite school.	
25	The Religious Pathology	آسیب‌شناسی دینی	2000	Mahdi Jahromi, Mohammad Bagheri	A study of Motahhari religious thoughts.	
26	Master Motahhari	استاد مطهری	2014	Mohsen Momeni	Biography of Master Motahhari for teenage audiences.	
27	Biography and Academic Life of Shadid M. Mutahari	زندگی‌نامه و خدمات علمی و فرهنگی استاد شهید مرتضی مطهری	2007	Omid Qanbari	Life and scientific and cultural activities of Professor Morteza Motahhari.	
28	Stories and Guidances: in the Works of Morteza Motahhari	حکایتها و هدایتها: در آثار استاد شهید آیه‌الله مرتضی مطهری	1984	Mohammad Javad Sahebi	Interesting points in Motahhari's works.	
29	Anecdotes and Wisdoms: A Collection of Stories by the Works of Master Shahid Motahari	حکایت‌ها و حکمت‌ها: مجموعه داستان‌های آثار استاد شهید مطهری	2004	Mahdi Nourmohammadi	A collection of stories by the works of Master Shahid Motahari.	
30	Interpretation of the Quran from the Words of Ayatollah Master Shahid Morteza Motahhari	تفسیر قرآن از کلام آیت‌الله استاد شهید مرتضی مطهری	2010	Heydar Shojaee	Exegesis of Quran from Motahhari’s perspective.	
31	Human Freedom	آزادی انسان	2011	Mohammad Saleh Hashemi Golpayegani	Theory of freedom accordings to Motahhari’s view.	
32	The Ancient Heritage	میراث باستانی	2012	Leila Keshavarzi, Azimeh Zare	Master Motahhari's thoughts in brief.	
33	Miracle Fingers	انگشت‌های معجزه	2011	Azar Honarjooyan	Master Motahhari's thoughts in brief: About trusting in God.	
34	Al-Ghadir and Islamic Unity	الغدیر و وحدت اسلامی	2001	Hossein Deylami	Examines Event of Ghadir Khumm in Motahhari’s thought.	
35	Motahar Description to Phrophetic Naration	شرح مطهر بر احادیث نبوی	2006	Hossein Ahmadi	Interpretation of the hadiths of prophet Muhammad by Motahhari.	

== See also ==
- Ali Khamenei bibliography
- Bibliography of Rasul Jafarian
- List of Shia books
