= Anti-Iranian sentiment =

Results of 2013 Pew Research Center poll Views of Iran by country
Country polled	Pos.	Neg.
Australia	16%	68%
Canada	14%	70%
Czech Republic	7%	74%
Egypt	20%	78%
France	11%	88%
Germany	7%	85%
Greece	21%	69%
Israel	5%	92%
Italy	5%	85%
Jordan	18%	81%
Lebanon	40%	60%
Palestine	37%	55%
Poland	18%	66%
Russia	32%	49%
Spain	7%	84%
Tunisia	30%	44%
Turkey	19%	68%
United Kingdom	17%	59%
United States	16%	69%

Anti-Iranian sentiment (Iranophobia) refers to any manifestation of hatred, prejudice, and discrimination against the Iranian people. It is most generally based upon a disdain for Iranian culture or the Persian language, and has been recorded across several countries and regions for centuries. The phenomenon may be motivated by a variety of factors, such as broader feelings of xenophobia or due to certain political developments involving Iran.

Historically, anti-Iranian sentiment (principally targeting Persians) has been a recurring theme in the Arab world since the Muslim conquest of Iran in the 7th century. Ethnic discontent between Arabs and Persians following the early Muslim conquests is thought to have peaked under the Umayyad dynasty and ultimately sparked the Iranian Intermezzo in the 9th century. This dynamic intensified with the Safavid conversion of Iran to Shia Islam by the 18th century and continues to influence Iran's relationship with the Arab League in the modern era.

A more recent surge in anti-Iranian sentiment began in the Western world, particularly in the United States, after the Iranian Revolution in 1979. In the aftermath of the Iran hostage crisis, the United States and other Western countries have repeatedly clashed with Iran in both diplomatic and military channels over several complex points of contention, including Iran's nuclear program and military activities in the Strait of Hormuz and throughout the Middle East, where it has been engaged in proxy conflicts with Saudi Arabia, Israel, and Turkey.

The opposite phenomenon is known as Iranophilia, which involves a deep admiration for the Iranian people and their history, culture, language(s), or country. This sentiment is notable for having been and continuing to be widespread in many parts of the Muslim world, especially in the Indian subcontinent, where a uniquely Indo-Persian culture developed under the Mughal Empire and other powerful Persianate societies.

== In the Arab world ==
=== Early Muslim conquests ===
==== "Ajam" slur ====
The word "ʻajam" is derived from the root ʻ-J-M and refers to "unclear, vague and/or incomprehensible" as opposed to "ʻarabi", which means "clear, understandable; with perfect Arabic tongue". ʻAjam came to mean "one who mumbles" or "has difficulty speaking", similar to the Slavic ethnonym and their usage of "mutes" to refer to Germans. It came to be "applied especially to Persians", and the distinction of the two terms is found already in pre- and early Islamic literature (ʻAjam Temtemī). "In general, ajam was a pejorative term, used by Arabs because of their contrived social and political superiority in early Islam.", as summarized by Clifford Bosworth. Although Arabic dictionaries state that the word ʻajami is used for all non-Arabs, the designation was primarily used for Persians.

==== Zoroastrian-based slurs ====
Many Sunni fundamentalist Arabs use slurs against Persians by calling them "fire worshippers" and "majus". Majus or majusi (مجوس) is an Arabic term for the Magi in Zoroastrianism.

==== Umayyad period ====
Patrick Clawson states, "The Iranians chafed under Umayyad rule. The Umayyads rose from traditional Arab aristocracy. They tended to marry other Arabs, creating an ethnic stratification that discriminated against Iranians. Even as Arabs adopted traditional Iranian bureaucracy, Arab tribalism disadvantaged Iranians."

Many Arab Muslims believed that Iranian converts should not clothe themselves as Arabs, and many other forms discrimination that existed. Mu'awiya I, is said to have sent a letter addressed to Ziyad ibn Abih, the then governor of Iraq, wrote:

And keep an eye on the Mawali (non Arab) and those Ajam who have accepted Islam and choose the style of Umar Ibn Khattab in dealing with them because in that is humiliation and degradation for them. And let Arab marry their women but their women should not marry Arab. Let Arab be their inheritors but they should not be inheritors of Arab. Reduce their subsistence and benefits and make them go in front in wars and let them maintain the roads, cut the trees and do not let them be the Imam of Arab in congregational prayers and do not let anyone of them be in the front row of prayer when Arab are present, unless the row is not completed by Arab. Do not appoint anyone of them as a Governor on the border of Muslims and do not appoint anyone as a Governor in any city. No one from them should be a Governor for making rules and decisions for Muslims because this was the style and habit of Umar. May Allah, from the Ummah of Muhammad (S.A.W), and particularly from Bani-Umayyah reward him, reward him greatly..

— Mu'awiya

Mistreatment of Iranians and other non-Arabs during the early period of Islam is well documented. Under the Umayyads, many mawlas (non-Arab Muslims) employed by a patron enjoyed favourable positions as equal to Arab Muslims, but they were generally victims of cultural bias and even sometimes considered to be on an equal footing of a slave. According to sources of that time, the mistreatment of mawlas was a general rule. They were denied any positions in the government under Umayyad rule.

The Umayyid Arabs are even reported to have prevented the mawali from having kunyahs, as an Arab was only considered worthy of a kunya. They were required to pay taxes for not being an Arab:

During the early centuries of Islam when the Islamic empire was really an Arab kingdom, the Iranians, Central Asians and other non-Arab peoples who had converted to Islam in growing numbers as mawali or 'clients' of an Arab lord or clan, had in practice acquired an inferior socio-economic and racial status compared to Arab Muslims, though the mawali themselves fared better than the empire's non-Muslim subjects, the Ahl al-Dhimmah ('people of the covenant'). The ةawali, for instance, paid special taxes, often similar to the jizyaا (poll tax) and the kharaj (land tax) levied on the Zoroastrians and other non-Muslim subjects, taxes which were never paid by the Arab Muslims.

— Farhad Daftary,

===== References in Persian literature =====
Zarrinkoub presents a lengthy discussion on the large flux and influence of the victorious Arabs on the literature, language, culture and society of Persia during the two centuries following the Islamic conquest of Persia in his book Two Centuries of Silence.

===== Suppression of Iranian languages =====
After the Islamic conquest of the Sassanid Empire, during the reign of the Umayyad dynasty, the Arab conquerors imposed Arabic as the primary language of the subject peoples throughout their empire. Not happy with the prevalence of the Iranian languages in the divan, Hajjāj ibn Yusuf ordered the official language of the conquered lands to be replaced by Arabic, sometimes by force. According to Biruni

When Qutaibah bin Muslim under the command of Al-Hajjaj bin Yousef was sent to Khwarazmia with a military expedition and conquered it for the second time, he swiftly killed whoever wrote the Khwarazmian native language that knew of the Khwarazmian history, science and culture. He then killed all their Zoroastrian priests and burned and wasted their books, until gradually the illiterate only remained, who knew nothing of writing and hence their history was mostly forgotten.

— Biruni From The Remaining Signs of Past Centuries,

It is difficult to imagine the Arabs not implementing anti-Persian policies in the light of such events, writes Zarrinkoub in his famous Two Centuries of Silence, where he exclusively writes of this topic. Reports of Persian speakers being tortured are also given in al-Aghānī.

==== After Safavid conversion of Iran to Shia Islam ====
Predominantly-Shia Islamic Iran has always exhibited a sympathetic side for Ali (the cousin and son-in-law of Muhammad) and his progeny. Even when Persia was largely Sunni, that was still evident, as can be seen from the writings remaining from that era. Rumi for example praises Ali in a section entitled "Learn from ʻAli". It recounts Ali's explanation as to why he declined to kill someone who had spit in his face as ʻAli was defeating him in battle. Persian literature in praise of Ali's progeny is quite ubiquitous and abundant. These all stem from numerous traditions regarding Ali's favor of Persians being as equals to Arabs.

Several early Shiite sources speak of a dispute arising between an Arab and an Iranian woman. Referring the case to ʻAli for arbitration, ʻAli reportedly did not allow any discrimination between the two to take place. His judgment thus invited the protest of the Arab woman. Thereupon, ʻAli replied, "In the Qurʼan, I did not find the progeny of Ishmael (the Arabs) to be any higher than the Iranians."

In another such tradition, Ali was once reciting a sermon in the city of Kufah, when Ash'as ibn Qays, a commander in the Arab army protested, "Amir-al-Momeneen! These Iranians are excelling the Arabs right in front of your eyes and you are doing nothing about it!" He then roared, "I will show them who the Arabs are!" Ali immediately retorted, "While fat Arabs rest in soft beds, the Iranians work hard on the hottest days to please God with their efforts. And what do these Arabs want from me? To ostracize the Iranians and become an oppressor! I swear by the God that splits the nucleus and creates Man, I heard the prophet once say, just as you strike the Iranians with your swords in the name of Islam, so will the Iranians one day strike you back the same way for Islam."

When the Sassanid city of Anbar fell to the forces of Mu'awiyeh, news reached Ali that the city had been sacked and plundered spilling much innocent blood. Early Shi'ite sources report that Ali gathered all the people of Kufa to the mosque and gave a fiery sermon. After describing the massacre, he said, "If somebody hearing this news now faints and dies of grief, I fully approve of it!" According to Kasraie, It is from here that Ali is said to have had more sympathy for Iranians while author S. Nureddin Abtahi claims that Umar highly resented them.

=== Modern era ===
==== Iraq ====
It was in Baghdad where the first Arab nationalists, mainly of Palestinian and Syrian descent, formed the basis of their overall philosophies. Prominent among them were individuals such as Mohammad Amin al-Husayni (the Mufti of Jerusalem) and Syrian nationalists such as Shukri al-Quwatli and Jamil Mardam. Sati' al-Husri, who served as advisor to the Ministry of Education and later as Director General of Education and Dean of the College of Law, was particularly instrumental in shaping the Iraqi educational system. Other prominent Pan-Arabists were Michel Aflaq and Khairallah Talfah, as well as Sati' al-Husri, Salah al-Din al-Bitar, Zaki al-Arsuzi and Sami Shwkat (brother of Naji Shawkat). These individuals formed the nucleus and genesis of true pan-Arabism.

Saddam Hussein forced out tens of thousands of people of Persian origin from Iraq in the 1970s, after having been accused of being spies for Iran and Israel. Today, many of them live in Iran.

===== Iran–Iraq War =====
Early on in his career, Saddam Hussein and pan-Arab ideologues targeted the Arabs of southwest Iran in an endeavour to have them separate and join 'the Arab nation.' Hussein made no effort to conceal Arab nationalism in his war against Iran (which he called "the second Battle of al-Qādisiyyah).

"Yellow revolution", "yellow wind", "yellow storm" were thrown as slurs by Saddam Hussein against Iran due to Hulagu's 1258 sack of Baghdad during the Mongol wars and the terms "Persian" and "Elamites" were also used by Saddam as insults.

On 2 April 1980, a half-year before the outbreak of the war, Saddam Hussein visited Al-Mustansiriya University in Baghdad. By drawing parallels to the 7th-Century defeat of Persia in the Battle of al-Qādisiyyah, he announced:

"In your name, brothers, and on behalf of the Iraqis and Arabs everywhere, we tell those [Persian] cowards who try to avenge Al-Qadisiyah that the spirit of Al-Qadisiyah as well as the blood and honor of the people of Al-Qadisiyah who carried the message on their spearheads are greater than their attempts."

Saddam also accused Iranians of "murdering the second (Umar), third (Uthman) and fourth (Ali) Caliphs of Islam", invading the three islands of Abu Musa and Greater and Lesser Tunbs in the Persian Gulf and attempting to destroy 'the Arabic language and civilization'.

In the war, Iraq made extensive use of chemical weapons (such as mustard gas) against Iranian troops and civilians as well as Iraqi Kurds. Iran expected a condemnation by UN of this act and sent allegation to UN. At time (-1985) the UN Security Council issued statements that "chemical weapons had been used in the war." However, in these UN-statements Iraq was not mentioned by name, so that the situation is viewed as "in a way, the international community remained silent as Iraq used weapons of mass destruction against Iranian as well as Iraqi Kurds" and it is believed that the United States had prevented UN from condemning Iraq.

In December 2006, Hussein said he would take responsibility "with honour" for any attacks on Iran using conventional or chemical weapons during the 1980–1988 war, but he took issue with charges he ordered attacks on Iraqis.

On the execution day, Hussein said, "I spent my whole life fighting the infidels and the intruders, [...] I destroyed the invaders and the Persians." He also stressed that the Iraqis should fight the Americans and the Persians. Mowaffak al Rubiae, Iraq's National Security adviser, who was a witness to Hussein's execution described him as repeatedly shouting "down with Persians." Hussein built an anti-Iranian monument called Hands of Victory in Baghdad in 1989 to commemorate his declaration of victory over Iran in the Iran-Iraq war (though the war is generally considered a stalemate). After his fall, it was reported that the new Iraqi government had organized the Committee for Removing Symbols of the Saddam Era and that the Hands of Victory monument had begun to be dismantled. However, the demolition was later halted.

===== Al-Qaeda in Iraq =====
Ayman al-Zawahiri, leader of Al-Qaeda since 2011, singled out Iran and Shia Muslims in his messages over the years, claiming in 2008 that "Persians" are the enemy of Arabs and that Iran cooperated with the U.S. during the occupation of Iraq.

===== 2019 Iraqi protests =====
Since 2019, anti-Iranian unrest has spiked in Iraq as Iran was blamed for sectarianism and political interferences. This has transcended into football during the 2022 FIFA World Cup qualification, with Iran and Iraq shared each win after two games.

==== United Arab Emirates ====
===== Persian Gulf naming dispute =====
The name of the Persian Gulf has become contested by some Arab countries since the 1960s in connection with the emergence of pan-Arabism and Arab nationalism, resulting in the invention of the toponym "Arabian Gulf" (Arabic: الخليج العربي) (used in some Arab countries), "the Gulf" and other alternatives such as the "Gulf of Basra", as it was known during the Ottoman rule of the region.

==== Saudi Arabia ====
Al-Salafi magazine, quoted in The Times, states, "Iran has become more dangerous than Israel itself. The Iranian Revolution has come to renew the Persian presence in the region. This is the real clash of civilizations."

In response to accusations made by Iran's supreme leader Ayatollah Ali Khamenei that Saudi authorities were responsible for killing Muslims injured during the 2015 Mina stampede, Abdul-Aziz ibn Abdullah Al ash-Sheikh, Grand Mufti of Saudi Arabia, stated in 2016 that Iranian leaders are descendants of Zoroastrians and are "not Muslims."

==== Bahrain ====
Since the Islamic Revolution, Bahrain and Iran have always been tense. In 1981, Bahraini Shia fundamentalists orchestrated a coup attempt under the auspices of a front organisation, the Islamic Front for the Liberation of Bahrain in hope to install an Iran-based cleric to rule Bahrain. Since then, the two countries do not enjoy strong relations. Iran's support for the March 2011 protests in Bahrain increased tensions between Bahrain and Iran, with Bahrain accusing Iran of funding the protests to destabilize the island. Eventually, Bahrain cut ties with Iran in 2016 following the 2016 attack on the Saudi diplomatic missions in Iran and the Iranian threat to Bahrain.

During the 2002 World Cup qualification between Bahrain and Iran, Bahrain beat Iran 3–1, thus Iran lost the chance to qualify directly for the World Cup to rival Saudi Arabia. Bahrainis had waved the flag of Saudi Arabia to demonstrate its solidarity with the Saudis and anti-Iranian sentiment. The same thing occurred 20 years later, with Bahrainis whistling at the Iranian National Anthem and jeering at the Iranian team.

==== Kuwait ====
Kuwaitis of Iranian descent (Ajam) are subjected to discrimination and xenophobic hate campaigns. The anti-preservation attitude of the Kuwaiti government towards Kuwaiti Persian will eventually lead to the disappearance of the language in Kuwaiti society, as Abdulmuhsen Dashti projects. The government of Kuwait tries to delegitimise the use of the language in as many domains as possible.

The Persian language has been considered a significant threat to the dominant Sunni Arab population. The Kuwaiti television series Karimo attempted to address the identity crisis of Kuwaitis of Iranian descent. The show showed Kuwaiti actors speaking fluent Persian; which resulted in some racist discourse against the Ajam community. The Alrai TV channel advertised the show in Farsi and Arabic.

In 2009, it was estimated that 89% of Kuwaiti Ajam aged 40-70 spoke Persian fluently as their native language; whereas only 28% of Kuwaiti Ajam aged 12-22 spoke Persian. Cultural, political, and economic marginalization creates a strong incentive for Kuwaiti Ajam to abandon their language in favor of Arabic which is widely perceived as a more prestigious language. This happens because Kuwaiti Ajam families want to achieve a higher social status, have a better chance to get employment and/or acceptance in a given social network so they adopt the cultural and linguistic traits of socially dominant groups with enough power imbalance to culturally integrate them, through various means of ingroup and outgroup coercion. The generation of Kuwaiti Ajam born between 1983 and 1993 are reported to have a minimal proficiency in their language unlike the older generations of Kuwaiti Ajam. Since the 1980s and 1990s, many Kuwaiti Ajam parents have reported an unwillingness to pass the Persian language on to their children, as it will hurdle their integration into the dominant culture. The Ajam feel pressure to abandon ties that could be interpreted as showing belonging to Iran, as Persian is synonymous with Iranian, and the Persian language is actually called Iranian in Kuwaiti Arabic. In several interviews conducted by PhD student Batoul Hasan, Ajam youth have shown hesitation to use or learn Persian due to stigmatisation and prejudice in Kuwait.

In 2012, MP Muhammad Hassan al-Kandari called for a "firm legal action" against an advertisement for teaching the Persian language in Rumaithiya.

UNESCO recognise Kuwaiti Persian as an endangered language. The decline of Kuwaiti Persian is a reflection of the forced homogeneity of Kuwait's national identity and marginalisation of ethnic, linguistic and cultural diversity among Kuwaiti citizens. Unlike Bahrain and Dubai where the Ajam citizens still speak their language (including the youngest generations).

==== Lebanon ====
The 2019–20 Lebanese protests saw Iran and its ally Hezbollah got antagonized by Lebanese protesters over the increasing economic decline and Iranian meddling on Lebanese sectarian system.

==== Jordan ====
The outbreak of Iranian Revolution and subsequent establishment of an Islamic regime in Iran changed drastically relationship from positive to negative. Jordan immediately backed Saddam Hussein on the Iran–Iraq War of 1980s and Iran severed diplomatic tie with Jordan aftermath. Due to Jordan's support for Iraq, even during the Gulf War, it took a decade before Iran and Jordan could normalize its relations.

Furthermore, Jordanian solidarity with majority of its Gulf allies have further strained relationship with Iran and increases anti-Iranian sentiment. Jordan has strongly opposed Iranian influence in Iraq and Syria, and has sought to work with Saudi Arabia, Israel and Russia to remove Iranian influence.

In 2017, Jordan summoned the Iranian envoy over its political remarks calling for anti-kingdom uprisings among Arab countries.

== In the Western world ==
=== United States ===
Anti-Iranian sentiment in the United States has been shaped by mid-20th-century housing covenants, geopolitical conflicts, and media portrayals. Hostility against Iranians and Iranian Americans sharply escalated following the 1979 Iran hostage crisis, resulting in systemic discrimination in social life, employment, and airport security. Additionally, Hollywood and American television series have faced long-standing criticism for perpetuating negative stereotypes and demonizing Iranian culture. In the 2020s, heightened diplomatic tensions between Washington and Tehran led to renewed concerns regarding ethnic profiling, increased border scrutiny, and federal entry restrictions.

=== Netherlands ===
==== Iran's nuclear program ====
In 2015, requests of the Ministries of Education and Foreign Affairs of the Netherlands to monitor Iranian students prevented them from studying at the University of Twente in the city of Enschede and Eindhoven University of Technology in the city of Eindhoven. The latter university had even asked the AIVD, the Dutch intelligence service, to monitor Iranian students. AIVD stated that it was not its duty to do so, and the university decided to stop admitting any applicants from Iran, regardless of the degree sought. The Dutch government said that it fears the theft of sensitive nuclear technology that could assist the Iranian government in constructing nuclear weapons. After protests were lodged, the Dutch government announced again that Iranian students and Dutch citizens of Iranian heritage were not allowed to study at many Dutch universities or go to some areas in the Netherlands.

Additionally, in 2008 several other universities stated that the government had prohibited them from admitting students from Iran, and technical colleges were not allowed to give Iranian students access to knowledge of nuclear technology. It was noted that it was the first time after the German occupation during the Second World War that ethnic-, religion- or racial-based restrictions were imposed in the Netherlands. Harry van Bommel, a parliamentarian of the Dutch Socialist Party (SP), condemned the berufsverbot, deliberately using a German word associated with the Second World War.

Although the Dutch authorities state that the UN security council's resolution 1737 (2006) authorises them and obliges all member states of the UN to take such a measure, it remains the only country to have done so.

On 3 February 2010, a court in The Hague ruled that the Dutch government's policy to ban Iranian-born students and scientists from certain master's degrees and from nuclear research facilities was overly broad and in violation of an international civil rights treaty.

=== Russia ===
==== Russo-Persian Wars ====
In the 19th century, during the existence of the Russian Empire, Russians dealt with Iran as an inferior "Orient", and held its people in contempt whilst ridiculing all aspects of Iranian culture. The Russian version of contemporaneous Western attitudes of superiority differed however. As Russian national identity was divided between East and West and Russian culture held many Asian elements, Russians consequently felt equivocal and even inferior to Western Europeans. In order to stem the tide of this particular inferiority complex, they tried to overcompensate to Western European powers by overemphasizing their own 'Europeanness' and Christian faith, and by expressing scornfully their low opinion of Iranians. The historian Elena Andreeva adds that this trend was not only very apparent in over 200 Russian travelogues written about Iran and published in the course of the 19th and early 20th centuries, but also in diplomatic and other official documents.

== In the Turkic world ==
=== Turkey ===
In Turkey, relatively large communities of Turks, Kurds and Zazas are Alevi Shia, while some areas in Eastern Anatolia, notably Kars and Ağrı, are Twelver Shia. Historically, the Shia Muslims were discriminated in the Ottoman Empire as they were associated with their Safavid/Qajar rivals.

According to a 2013 survey, 75% of Turks look at Iran unfavorably against 14% with favorable views. Political scientist Shireen Hunter writes that there are two significant groups in Turkey that are hostile towards Iran: "the military establishment and the ultra-Kemalist elite" and the "ultranationalists with pan-Turkist aspirations" (such as the Grey Wolves). Canadian author Kaveh Farrokh also suggests that pan-Turkist groups (the Grey Wolves in particular) have encouraged anti-Iranian sentiments.

=== Azerbaijan ===
Historic falsifications in the Republic of Azerbaijan, in relation to Iran and its history, are "backed by state and state backed non-governmental organizational bodies", ranging "from elementary school all the way to the highest level of universities".

As a result of the two Russo-Persian Wars of the 19th century, the border between what is present-day Iran and the Republic of Azerbaijan was formed. Although there had not been a historical Azerbaijani state to speak of in history, the demarcation, set at the Aras river, left significant numbers of what were later coined "Azerbaijanis" to the north of the Aras river. During the existence of the Azerbaijan SSR of the Soviet Union, pan-Turkist political elites of Baku who were loyal to the Communist cause, in tandem with Soviet-era historical revisionism and myth-building, invented a national history based on the existence of an Azeri nation-state that dominated the areas to the north and south of the Aras river, which was supposedly torn apart by an Iranian-Russian conspiracy in the Treaty of Turkmenchay of 1828. This "imagined community" was cherished, promoted and institutionalized in formal history books of the educational system of the Azerbaijan SSR and the post-Soviet Azerbaijan Republic. As the Soviet Union was a closed society, and its people were unaware of the actual realities regarding Iran and its Azeri citizens, the elites in Soviet Azerbaijan kept cherishing and promoting the idea of a "united Azerbaijan" in their activities. This romantic thought led to the founding of nostalgic literary works, known as the "literature of longing"; examples amongst this genre are, for instance, Foggy Tabriz by Mammed Said Ordubadi, and The Coming Day by Mirza Ibrahimov. As a rule, works belonging to the "literature of longing" genre were characterized by depicting the life of Iranian Azeris as a misery due to suppression by the "Fars" (Persians), and by narrating fictional stories about Iranian Azeris waiting for the day when their "brothers" from the "north" would come and liberate them. Works that belonged to this genre, as the historian and political scientist Zaur Gasimov explains, "were examples of blatant Azerbaijani nationalism stigmatizing the "division" of the nation along the river Araxes, as well as denunciations of economic and cultural exploitation of Iranian Azerbaijanis, etc." Gasimov adds: "an important by-product of this literary genre was strongly articulated anti-Iranian rhetoric. Tolerance and even support of this anti-Iranian rhetoric by the communist authorities were obvious."

During the Soviet nation building campaign, any event, both past and present, that had ever occurred in what is the present-day Azerbaijan Republic and Iranian Azerbaijan were rebranded as phenomenons of "Azerbaijani culture". Any Iranian ruler or poet that had lived in the area was assigned to the newly rebranded identity of the Transcaucasian Turkophones, in other words "Azerbaijanis". According to Michael P. Croissant: "It was charged that the "two Azerbaijans", once united, were separated artificially by a conspiracy between imperial Russia and Iran". This notion based on illegitimate historic revisionism suited Soviet political purposes well (based on "anti-imperialism"), and became the basis for irredentism among Azerbaijani nationalists in the last years of the Soviet Union, shortly prior to the establishment of the Azerbaijan Republic in 1991.

In the Republic of Azerbaijan, periods and aspects of Iranian history are usually claimed as being an "Azerbaijani" product in a distortion of history, and historic Iranian figures, such as the Persian poet Nizami Ganjavi are called "Azerbaijanis", contrary to universally acknowledged fact. In the Azerbaijan SSR, forgeries such as an alleged "Turkish divan" and falsified verses were published in order to "Turkify" Nizami Ganjavi. Although this type of irredentism was initially the result of the nation building policy of the Soviets, it became an instrument for "biased, pseudo-academic approaches and political speculations" in the nationalistic aspirations of the young Azerbaijan Republic. In the modern Azerbaijan Repuiblic, historiography is written with the aim of retroactively Turkifying many of the peoples and kingdoms that existed prior to the arrival of Turks in the region, including the Iranian Medes.

According to professor of history George Bournoutian:

"As noted, in order to construct an Azerbaijani national history and identity based on the territorial definition of a nation, as well as to reduce the influence of Islam and Iran, the Azeri nationalists, prompted by Moscow devised an "Azeri" alphabet, which replaced the Arabo-Persian script. In the 1930s a number of Soviet historians, including the prominent Russian Orientalist, Ilya Petrushevskii, were instructed by the Kremlin to accept the totally unsubstantiated notion that the territory of the former Iranian khanates (except Yerevan, which had become Soviet Armenia) was part of an Azerbaijani nation. Petrushevskii's two important studies dealing with the South Caucasus, therefore, use the term Azerbaijan and Azerbaijani in his works on the history of the region from the sixteenth to the nineteenth centuries. Other Russian academics went even further and claimed that an Azeri nation had existed from ancient times and had continued to the present. Since all the Russian surveys and almost all nineteenth-century Russian primary sources referred to the Muslims who resided in the South Caucasus as "Tatars" and not "Azerbaijanis", Soviet historians simply substituted Azerbaijani for Tatars. Azeri historians and writers, starting in 1937, followed suit and began to view the three-thousand-year history of the region as that of Azerbaijan. The pre-Iranian, Iranian, and Arab eras were expunged. Anyone who lived in the territory of Soviet Azerbaijan was classified as Azeri; hence the great Iranian poet Nezami, who had written only in Persian, became the national poet of Azerbaijan."

Bournoutian adds:

Although after Stalin's death arguments rose between Azerbaijani historians and Soviet Iranologists dealing with the history of the region in ancient times (specifically the era of the Medes), no Soviet historian dared to question the use of the term Azerbaijan or Azerbaijani in modern times. As late as 1991, the Institute of History of the Academy of Sciences of the USSR, published a book by an Azeri historian, in which it noy only equated the "Tatars" with the present-day Azeris, but the author, discussing the population numbers in 1842, also included Nakhichevan and Ordubad in "Azerbaijan". The author, just like Petrushevskii, totally ignored the fact that between 1828 and 1921, Nakhichivan and Ordubad were first part of the Armenian Province and then part of the Yerevan guberniia and had only become part of Soviet Azerbaijan, some eight decades later (...) Although the overwhelming number of nineteenth-century Russian and Iranian, as well as present-day European historians view the Iranian province of Azarbayjan and the present-day Republic of Azerbaijan as two separate geographical and political entities, modern Azeri historians and geographers view it as a single state that has been separated into "northern" and "southern" sectors and which will be united in the future. (...) Since the collapse of the Soviet Union the current Azeri historians have not only continued to use the terms "northern" and "southern" Azerbaijan, but also assert that the present-day Armenian Republic was a part of northern Azerbaijan. In their fury over what they view as the "Armenian occupation" of Nagorno-Karabakh [which incidentally was an autonomous Armenian region within Soviet Azerbaijan], Azeri politicians and historians deny any historic Armenian presence in the South Caucasus and add that all Armenian architectural monuments located in the present-day Republic of Azerbaijan are not Armenian but [Caucasian] Albanian."

Since 1918, political elites with Pan-Turkist-oriented sentiments in the area that comprises the present-day Azerbaijan Republic have depended on the concept of ethnic nationalism in order to create an anti-Iranian sense of ethnicity amongst Iranian Azeris. According to political adviser Eldar Mamedov, "Anti-Iranian policies [have been] carried out by various Azerbaijani governments since the 1990s." Azerbaijan's second President Abulfaz Elchibey (1992–93) and his government has been widely described as pursuing Pan-Turkic and anti-Iranian policies. Iranian Azerbaijani intellectuals who have promoted Iranian cultural and national identity and put forth a reaction to early pan-Turkist claims over Iran's Azerbaijan region have been dubbed traitors to the "Azerbaijani nation" within the pan-Turkist media of the Republic of Azerbaijan. The Azerbaijani government also lends support to anti-Iranian scholars situated in the West. In addition to being Turkocentric, Azerbaijan's post-Soviet national identity is strongly anti-Iran. It has been built in various ways to oppose Iran as "the other," not just as a country but also as a culture and historical entity. Nowadays, being Azerbaijani means rejecting any ties to Iran.

== See also ==
- Not Without My Daughter (book)
- Not Without My Daughter (film)
- Anti-Kurdish sentiment
- Anti-Shi'ism
- Arab–Israeli alliance, sometimes referred to as anti-Iran coalition.
- Shia–Sunni relations
- 1987 Mecca Massacre
- Culture of Iran
- Demographics of Iran
- History of Iran
- Human capital flight from Iran
- Iranian diaspora
- Islam in Iran
- Islamophobia
- Persophile
- Religion in Iran
- Freedom of religion in Iran
- Sectarian violence among Muslims
