= The Principles of Philosophy and the Method of Realism =

Book about Islamic Philosophy and Philosophical Realism

- Author: Muhammad Husayn Tabatabai; Morteza Motahhari
- Original title: اصول فلسفه و روش رئالیسم
- Translator: Ja'far Sobhani (into Arabic); Shuja Ali Mirza (into English)
- Language: Persian; Arabic; English
- Series: 5 Volumes
- Subject: Islamic philosophy; Philosophical realism; Islamic epistemology
- Publisher: Sadra (Persian edition)
- Publication date: 1953
- Publication place: Iran
- Website: mortezamotahari.com

The Principles of Philosophy and the Method of Realism (Persian: اصول فلسفه و روش رئالیسم) is a book containing 14 articles by Muhammad Husayn Tabatabai on Islamic philosophy and Epistemology which has been published in 5 volumes. The book with comprehensive explanations and footnotes by Morteza Motahhari, is a book consisting of a short course in Islamic epistemology. The book discusses the most basic issues of Islamic philosophy with a simple and general text. The book not only contains important issues of old and new philosophy, but also includes an innovative text in the field of Islamic philosophy. It has also examined and critiqued Western philosophy.

== Outline ==
The book "The Principles of Philosophy and the Method of Realism" is a five-volume collection written by Allamah Muhammad Husayn Tabatabai, on which his disciple Morteza Motahhari, has written comprehensive footnotes in explaining the contents of the text.

The author, Allamah Tabatabai, firstly, does not restrict philosophy to Islam or the East, and secondly, he seems to have a special understanding of the interpretation of realism and interpret it as clear-sightedness, seeking the right and surrendering to the truth, which is innate in human. In fact, with this collection, Allamah Tabatabai wanted to call free, truth-seeking people to think, reflect, debate and accompany.

In the book "The Principles of Philosophy and the Method of Realism", Tabatabai has expressed his thoughts; The book also includes the philosophical thoughts of Morteza Motahhari, Tabatabai's disciple. From the point of view of Tabatabai's realism, reality is proved briefly and not completely; This realism also says that knowledge depends on us and it is not given, and the adaptation of knowledge to the given is briefly and not completely. Man's access to the reality outside of himself is also brief, not complete. In general, Tabatabai says that we want the reality; But in practice we only acquire knowledge, and reality itself does not reach us; From Tabatabai's speech it can be concluded that human knowledge is not a pure reality; Rather, it reflects the fact that it is represented in the perceptual system by the perceptual system.

Tabatabai says: It is not the case that human beings have understood the reality as it is; Rather, they have each realized a direction and an aspect of reality. They overlap these thoughts to get to the reality better. This becomes the interaction between the perceivers. The result of this interactive realism, in the sense that it has an epistemological aspects in politics and society as Tabatabai says: social thinking, social contemplation, social ijtihad; That is, his theology is also influenced by his epistemology. The theories he has in the field of politics are also influenced by his epistemology, which we can call interactive realism.

Tabatabai's realism is interactive. The interactivity of this realism is due to the fact that the perception we have, our perception and our knowledge, is a set of interactions between the perceptual system and external reality. How do we know the truth of this perception and our knowledge? We learn from the interaction between perceptions; In addition, we humans with perceptual limitations can interact with our perceptions to achieve a better and more complete realism.

According to Tabatabai, there are two types of perceptions: 1. considered, 2. substantive. Factors influencing "considered" perceptions are: geographical environment, environment of action and employment, the evolution of material life, the evolution of information and the frequency of entry of a thought into the human mind. Factors influencing "substantive" perceptions are: perceptual system, human morality, social morality, personal behaviors and actions, social behaviors and actions and external factors such as residence, extreme poverty, extreme wealth, economic system, economic rules and rights, social civilization characteristics.

According to Tabatabai, a set of factors interferes with our perception. There are truths that cannot be achieved by any spiritual or practical condition, but moral, practical, and behavioral conditions are necessary for someone to be able to attain those truths.

In the fifth article, Tabatabai shows the process of producing basic concepts in the mind and it can be considered as a kind of psychology or mind related examine of perception.

In addition to using the research of a thousand treatises on Islamic philosophy in the book, full attention has been paid to the opinions and research of the European scientists. There are parts of the book that are not previously covered in Islamic and European philosophy.

After World War II in 1945, when Western and Soviet ideologies pervaded the minds of Iranians, Motahhari went to confront these foreign ideas by organizing this book.

=== Volumes ===
The first volume of the book contains a brief course in philosophy, expresses the important issues of philosophy, and tries to be as simple and general as possible to understand. In this volume, an attempt has been made to clearly represent all the deviations of Dialectical materialism.

In the second volume, the perceptions and the way of mental and intellectual actions of human beings have been examined in a special way.

The third volume contains a series of articles called "Issues of Existence". It also discusses the issue of necessity and certainty that control the work of the universe. The issue of human compulsion and authority and the talent of his duty and responsibility towards the inevitable system of beings has also been discussed.

The publication of the fourth volume was delayed for a long time due to the disagreement on a subject between Motahhari and Tabatabai. Regarding the fourth volume of the book, the footnotes of the professor Motahhari were not completed because of his martyrdom. Therefore, this volume included the text of the book and the unfinished footnotes of the master Motahhari.

The topics of the fifth volume are about knowing God and His attributes and actions. It is a kind of theology in a special sense: the divine essence, the perfect attributes of truth, how the world is attributed and issued by the creator. The main value of this book is that it is a kind of intellectual and mental conduct in the numinous world.

== Title of articles ==
This 5-volume book has a total of fourteen articles with the following titles:

1. What is Philosophy? (Persian: فلسفه چیست؟), In the first volume.
2. Philosophy and Sophistry (Persian: فلسفه و سفسطه), In the first volume.
3. Knowledge and Perception (Persian: علم و ادراک), In the first volume.
4. Value of Givens (Persian: ارزش معلومات), In the first volume.
5. The Emergence of Plurality in Perceptions (Persian: پيدايش كثرت در ادراكات), In the second volume.
6. Considered Perceptions (Persian: ادراکات اعتباری), In the second volume.
7. Reality and Existence of Objects (Persian: واقعيت و هستى اشياء), In the third volume.
8. Necessity and Possibility (Persian: ضرورت و امكان), In the third volume.
9. Cause and Effect (Persian: علت و معلول), In the third volume.
10. Force and Action, Possibility and Actuality (Persian: قوه و فعل، امکان و فعلیت), In the fourth volume.
11. Precedence and Occurrence (Persian: قدم و حدوث), In the fourth volume.
12. Unity and Plurality (Persian: وحدت و كثرت), In the fourth volume.
13. Quiddity, Substance, Accident (Persian: ماهيت، جوهر، عرض), In the fourth volume.
14. God of the Universe and the Universe (Persian: خداى جهان و جهان), In the fifth volume.

== Translation ==
The book "The Principles of Philosophy and the Method of Realism" originally published in Persian. It has been translated into Arabic and English too.

== See also ==
- Spiritual Discourses
- Understanding Islamic Sciences
- Anecdotes of pious men
- Sexual Ethics in Islam and in the Western World
- Atlas of Shia
- Hadiqat al Haqiqa
- Reflection on the Ashura movement
- Step by Step Up to Union With God
- Al-Nijat
