= Sexual Ethics in Islam and in the Western World =

Iranian book on sexual ethics

- Author: Morteza Motahhari
- Original title: اخلاق جنسی در اسلام و جهان غرب
- Translator: Muhammad Khurshid Ali (into English)
- Language: Persian; English; Urdu; Spanish; Turkish; Arabic
- Subject: Personality development; Islamic ethics; Marital in Islam; Sexual ethics
- Genre: Article and lecture
- Publisher: Islamic Publications Office; Sadra; (Persian edition); Bethat Islamic Research Centre (BIRC); ICAS Press; (English edition)
- Publication date: 1982
- Publication place: Iran
- Pages: 91
- Website: http://lib.motahari.ir

Sexual Ethics in Islam and in the Western World (Persian: اخلاق جنسی در اسلام و جهان غرب) is a book containing a series of articles by Morteza Motahhari. The articles covered topics such as sexual ethics and the ideas of new thinkers, evaluation of the principles of the new sexual system, causes of rebellion of the psychic powers, democracy in morality, personality development in terms of sexual instinct. Referring to the views of Will Durant and Bertrand Russell on sexual morality and their goals of freedom in sexual issues, a comparison has been made in the book between Islam and the Western world in the issue of restricting or not restricting sexual activities in the society.

== Summary ==
In the book Sexual Ethics in Islam and in the Western World, the author Morteza Motahhari examines the discussion of "sexual ethics" in its various dimensions in Western schools, then criticizes these theories, expresses the view of the Islamic school. He enumerates the strengths and advantages of the Islamic view over the Western view, which promotes the human personality and the growth of secure side of family and society.

The main subject of the book is family and women. The book explains the system of women's rights in Islam, the legal system of family and the requirements of the legal relationship between men and women, it also explains the moral and behavioral requirements of the relationship between men and women.

The author considers sexual morality as a part of morality in the general sense, including those human habits, properties, and methods that depend on sexual instinct. Some of its examples are: modesty of women from men, zeal of honor of men, chastity and fidelity of women towards husbands, hijab related matters and Islamic prohibition matters in sexuality.

The author also considers humiliating beliefs about women among ancient nations and tribes, with the theme that woman is not a perfect human being, it is a purgatory between man and animal, woman does not have a rational soul, woman will never enter heaven, and many like these. The author says these ideas and opinions are useless and never enough to know the human truth of women, other than a feeling of pride in men and feelings of inferiority in women. The belief in the filth of sexuality and sexual intercourse absolutely disturbs the soul of man and woman equally, and creates a fierce conflict between natural instinct on the one hand and religious belief on the other hand.

Motahhari mentioned that the emotional upheaval that results in dire consequences is always the result of a conflict between natural inclinations and opposing social instincts. In view of the above points, the supreme logic of Islam in sexuality attracts a great deal of attention. In Islam, there is not the slightest reference to the filth of sexual interest and its effects. Islam has used its effects to regulate the interest. According to Islam, sexual relations limited in some aspects to secure the situation for the present society or the next generation, and in this regard, Islam has taken measures that do not lead to feelings of deprivation and failure and suppression of the sexual instinct. Unfortunately, Western scholars who criticize Christianity, Buddhism, etc. in this regard remain silent about Islam.

== Chapters ==
=== Sexual Desire or Inherent Sin in the Old World ===
What causes man to look with pessimism at his natural desire and to actually condemn a part of his being? According to Islam, sexual interest is not only not in conflict with spirituality, but is part of the temperament of the prophets. Muhammad and the Twelve Imams, according to the many works and narrations, have openly expressed their love and affection for women and, on the contrary, severely condemned those who wished to become monks. One of the companions of Muhammad, Uthman ibn Mazoon, performed the act of worship excessively, he fasted every day, and prayed every night until morning. His wife told Muhammad who looked angry, got up and went to Uthman ibn Mazoon, and said to him: "O 'Uthman, know that God did not send me for monasticism, my law, is an easy natural law, I personally pray and fast and have intercourse with my wife, whoever wants to follow my religion must accept my tradition. Marriage and intercourse between men and women is one of my traditions".

=== Sexual Ethics ===
Sexual morality has always been one of the most important parts of human morality due to the extraordinary strength and power of this instinct to which this part of human morality depends. What is the source of this morality? Did this morality originate from human nature? Did nature instill these feelings and emotions in human beings in order to achieve their goals and to systematize human life, which is naturally social? Or there are other causes at work and throughout history have affected the human spirit to gradually become part of the human moral conscience. What to do today? In the field of sexual morality, what path should human beings take to achieve blissfulness?

God did not create a member of the body in vain, nor did he create a gift of spiritual talent, and just as all the organs of the body must be preserved and nourished, so must the spiritual talents be recorded and given enough food to cause grow them. "Theology" led us to this principle: nurturing talents and not to prevent them. Some people think that Islamic ethics and education are based on prevention and prohibition of natural talents. They have used Islamic specialized interpretations in field of "spirit refine and reform" as an excuse. Quran states: "Blessed is he who purifies his spirit". From this it is understood that firstly, Quran considers the contamination of the human conscience possible, and secondly, it considers the purification of the conscience from those impurities at one's own discretion, and thirdly, considers it necessary and obligatory and considers happiness and salvation in it.

In one place, Islam has referred to the spirit (the inner state of man) with the adjective "inclined to evil"; in another place with the adjective "tendency to blame himself" which means reproaching himself for committing evil, and in another place with the adjective "confident about himself" which means calming and reaching perfection. From all this, it is understood that according to Quran, human carnal nature can have different stages. Therefore, Islam in its theoretical philosophy does not consider the carnal nature of man to be inherently evil, and in its practical philosophy, unlike the Indian philosophical and educational systems, either Cynicism or Manichaeism or Christianity, it does not follow the method of destroying the carnal powers or at least imprisonment by their cruel actions. As the practical instructions of Islam attest to this claim.

If, from an Islamic moral point of view, natural talents should not be destroyed, then what is the meaning of the term "ego-killing", or "killing the ego", which may be found in religious interpretations and more in the interpretations of Islamic moral teachers, and especially in the mystical interpretations of Islamic mystics? Islam does not say that carnal nature and natural innate talent should be destroyed, Islam says the "carnality part of ego" should be extinguished. The "carnality part of ego" represents a disorder and a kind of rebellion that occurs in the human conscience for certain reasons. Killing the ego means extinguishing and suppressing sedition and rebellion in the field of sensual powers and talents. There is a difference between silencing sedition and destroying the forces that cause sedition. Extinguishing sedition, does not require the destruction of the individuals and forces that caused the riots and sedition, but requires the elimination of the factors that compelled those individuals and forces to sedition. This kind of extinguishing is sometimes achieved by saturation and satisfaction and sometimes by opposition to it.

=== Confusion of Instincts and Desires ===
Suppression of instincts and desires, especially sexual instinct, causes many harms and inconveniences. The principle that was accepted by perhaps the majority of ancient thinkers was that the weaker the instincts and natural inclinations are kept, the more open and unobstructed the field becomes for the higher instincts and forces, it has no basis. Deprivation is the source of the formation of complexes, and complexes may manifest as dangerous traits such as the desire for oppression and crime, arrogance, jealousy, isolation, pessimism, and so on.

Not suppressing instincts means releasing desires, does not mean removing all restrictions and limits. Saturation of instinct is not contrary to the principle of chastity and piety, but only in the shadow of chastity and piety that instinct can be sufficiently saturated and prevent unnecessary excitement and unhappiness and the feeling of deprivation and repression caused by those emotions. In other words, "cultivating" talents is not equal to "satisfying" endless desires. One of the characteristics and advantages of human beings over animals is that two types of desires may be found in human beings, honest desires and false desires. Honest desires are the ones that are necessary for the main nature. In every human being, nature has a desire for self-preservation, power and domination, sexuality, eating, and the like. Each of these desires has a purpose and wisdom, in addition, these are limited, but all of these can be the basis of a false desire, for example, the false appetite that people have about food is well known. In some desires and instincts, of which the sexual instinct is one, this desire often turns into a spiritual thirst, that is, contentment and ending are not in that way. Natural instinct can be saturated, but false desire is unsaturated, especially if it takes the form of spiritual thirst.

=== Sexual Discipline, Instinct of Love ===
Man must treat his instincts and desires like a just and democratic government with the masses. One of the important issues of sexual morality is the issue of love. Mystics have considered love being current in all things, and human love as the manifestation of that universal truth. In terms of psychological and social effects of love, that is, in terms of the changes it creates in the spirit and in terms of the effects it has on the creation of artistic, taste and social works, love is very different from a simple animal lust that aims only to satisfy and saturate.

The particular lustful state is selfish as long as it has a lustful form, and in this state man looks at the subject of lust as a tool, but as soon as it takes the form of love, the desired subject becomes so original that it becomes even more dear and precious of the human's life. Insofar as one wants to sacrifice one's life.

From the Eastern point of view, love gives spirit, character and glory, it is inspiring, it has alchemy effect, it is complementary, it is purifying, not because it leads to beloved, because love free the ego from manifestations of selfishness. Love is one of the things that can not be recommended and prescribed.

=== Love and Chastity ===
There are two possible types of love: One in the form of a state of passion and fervor, which as a result of the far away reach of the beloved and the extraordinary excitement of the soul and the concentration of intellectual powers in a single point on the one hand, and the rule of chastity and piety to the soul of the lover on the other. This kind of love creates wonderful changes in the spirit, perhaps creates genius, and, of course, separation are the main conditions for the emergence of such a state, and join the beloved is its burial ground, at least joining prevents it from reaching its peak of intensity and creating the wonderful changes that philosophers want. Such loves are more internal, that is, the external subject is an excuse for the spirit to boil from within.

Another type of love is the love, tenderness, purity and intimacy that arise between couples over time as a result of constant socializing and sharing in the hardships and weaknesses and joys and sorrows of life and the adaptation of their spirits to each other. If the community is pure and undefiled, and the pleasures of the couple are assigned to each other as required by the principles of chastity and piety, even in old age when lust is silent and unable to bind the couple together, that sincere affection will joins them together.

The first type is in fact the flight, action and attraction of the two divergent souls, and the second type is the unity and oneness of the two companion spirits. Both of these only go and flourish in communities ruled by chastity and piety. Sexual or quasi-sexual environments are not able to create so-called poetic and romantic love, nor can create such purity and intimacy between couples that was mentioned.

== Translations ==
The book Sexual Ethics in Islam and in the Western World was originally published in Persian. It has been translated into English, Spanish, Turkish, Arabic and Urdu too.

== See also ==
- Spiritual Discourses
- Understanding Islamic Sciences
- Anecdotes of pious men
- The Principles of Philosophy and the Method of Realism
- Atlas of Shia
- Hadiqat al-Haqiqa
- Reflection on the Ashura movement
- Step by Step Up to Union With God
