= Spiritual Discourses (book) =

Book about Islamic self-improvement

- Author: Morteza Motahhari
- Original title: آزادی معنوی گفتارهای معنوی
- Translator: Aluddin Pazargadi (into English)
- Language: Persian; English; Arabic; Urdu; Spanish
- Subject: Islam - self-improvement
- Genre: Article and lecture
- Publisher: Sadra (Persian edition), M S A, Incorporated (English edition)
- Publication date: 1986
- Publication place: Iran
- English publication date: 1986
- Pages: 272
- ISBN: 9780961689704
- Website: http://lib.motahari.ir

Spiritual Discourses (also known as Spiritual Sayings (Persian: گفتارهای معنوی) or Spiritual Freedom (Persian: آزادی معنوی)) is a book of fifteen lectures delivered by Morteza Motahhari. The common aspect of all of these lectures is their reflection on self-improvement and self-cultivation, though they also address social issues at some points.

== Background ==
Most of the lectures were delivered in Hosseiniyeh Ershad between 1968 and 1971 in Iran, Tehran. Their subject matter concerns spiritual issues around self-construction and self-cultivation. Morteza Motahhari references philosophical anthropology to explain and explore these concepts.

The first edition of Spiritual Discourses was published in 1986, consisting of thirteen lectures across eight chapters in Iran. In the nineteenth edition, two lectures were added to the second chapter. The Persian title of the book, گفتارهای معنوی, was renamed to Spiritual Freedom (آزادی معنوی) after several editions by the publisher. It has been reprinted more than 80 times in Iran.

== Chapters ==
The book has eight chapters:

1. Spiritual Freedom (Persian: آزادی معنوی) – two lectures delivered in 1969 in Hosseiniyeh Ershad, Tehran.
2. Worship and Prayer (Persian: عبادت و دعا) – four lectures delivered in 1970 in Hosseiniyeh Ershad, Tehran.
3. Repentance (Persian: توبه) – two lectures delivered in 1970 in Hosseiniyeh Ershad, Tehran.
4. Migration and Jihad (Persian: هجرت و جهاد) – three lectures delivered in 1971 in Naarmak Mosque, Tehran.
5. Nobility and Magnanimity of Spirit (Persian: بزرگی و بزرگواری روح) – a lecture delivered on November 8, 1970, in Hosseiniyeh Ershad, Tehran.
6. Belief in the Unseen (Persian: ایمان به غیب) – a lecture delivered in November 1968 in a private home.
7. The Criteria for Humanity (Persian: معیار انسانیت چیست؟) – a university lecture.
8. The School of Humanity (Persian: مکتب انسانیت) – a lecture delivered at the College of Engineering, University of Tehran.

== Reception ==
In a meeting with a group of poets on August 15, 2011, Ali Khamenei, Supreme Leader of Iran, recommended the book after pointing out the usefulness of reading the Quran, Nahj al-Balagha and Al-Sahifa al-Sajjadiyya.

== Translations ==
The book was originally published in Persian, and has been translated into English, Urdu, Spanish and Arabic.

== See also ==
- The Principles of Philosophy and the Method of Realism
- Sexual Ethics in Islam and in the Western World
- Understanding Islamic Sciences
- Anecdotes of pious men
- Atlas of Shia
- Hadiqat al Haqiqa
- Reflection on the Ashura movement
- Step by Step Up to Union With God
