= Step by Step Up to Union With God =

1980 book about Persian Sufi poet Rumi

Step by Step Up to Union With God: Life, Thought and Spiritual Journey of Jalal-al-din Rumi
- Author: Abdolhossein Zarrinkoob
- Original title: پله‌پله تا ملاقات خدا: دربارهٔ زندگی، اندیشه و سلوک مولانا جلال الدین رومی
- Translator: Majd ad-Din Keyvani
- Language: Persian
- Subject: Rumi's life, thought and conduct
- Publisher: Elmi
- Publication date: 1980
- Publication place: Iran
- Pages: 394

Step by Step Up to Union With God (Persian: پله‌پله تا ملاقات خدا) is a book by Abdolhossein Zarrinkoob, a scholar of Iranian literature, history of literature, Persian culture and history.

The book is about the life, thought and spiritual conduct of the 13th-century Persian Sufi poet, Mowlana Jalaluddin Mohammad Balkhi Rumi (1207–1273). The author, Abdolhossein Zarrinkoob, unlike his other writings, refrained from giving various references and sources in the book and has written all the contents in a simple, fluent and common sense.

The title of the book is taken from a distich from the section called "Books 3" from "Masnavi" written by "Rumi":

از مقامات تبتل تا فنا پله پله تا ملاقات خدا

Translation:

From the stations of asceticism to the passing away (from self-existence),
Step by step up to union with God

== Plot ==
The book Step by Step Up to Union With God: Life, Thought and Spiritual Journey of Jalal-al-din Rumi tells the story of the "Rumi 's" life from his birth to the end of his life. It starts from "Rumi 's" childhood, and gradually reviews his whole life, mystical conduct and spiritual ascension. The book is mostly written as a story; But it is a documentary story whose subject matter is not one of the conventional categories of the story. The book covers the poet's childhood and his travels with his father from Khorasan and Baghdad to Anatolia, where he remained in Konya for the rest of his life. Everywhere in the book, there is talk of "Rumi 's" love for God and his efforts to reach the god and the beloved, and only a few parts of the book deal with his daily activities, mostly including mystical aspects of "Rumi 's" life. The author has tried to present a simple book to readers without cumbersome contents.

The text of the book depicts the revelations of "Rumi 's" childhood years, his asceticism and austerity, the illusions of his school years and then the interruption of them in the sequence of years, the levels of a spiritual conduct that is the result of his life and the basis of his book "Masnavi".

The book appraises "Rumi 's" spiritual excitement, his love for the perfect man, his ecstasy and his obsession with poetry, dance and music, which separates him step by step from his belongings and prepares him to ascend to meet the Lord. The author pursues events separately and in the sequence of normal life, without going into the details of the secrets of "Rumi 's" teaching, draws a picture of his condition and thoughts to the extent that shows traces of "Rumi 's" long secrets throughout the "Masnavi", and sequels the sixty-eight-year life of Rumi and its unique attributes such as the spiritual, uninterrupted and indefatigable journey step by step from cutting off the heart's desire from the world to disappearing self-existence and unity with the whole wisdom.

Thus, the book shows the path of "Rumi 's" conduct which starts from the discard dependencies with one's own belongings and continues until the severance of ties with one's ego, and this path is the base of the elegance theme of "Masnavi" and a summary of the "Rumi 's" life too.

== Book chapters ==
The book "Step by Step Up to Union With God: Life, Thought and Spiritual Journey of Jalal-al-din Rumi" has about 400 pages and 100 sections. The chapters are:

- "بهاءولد و خداوندگار", means: "Baha ol-Valad and the Lord"
- "هجرت یا فرار", means: "Emigration or escape"
- "لالای پیر در قونیه", means: "The aged mentor in Konya"
- "طلوع شمس", means: "Advent of Shams"
- "غیبت بی‌بازگشت", means: "Irreversible absence"
- "رقص در بازار", means: "Dance in the bazaar"
- "حسام الدین و قصه مثنوی", means: "Hesamuddin and the story of Masnavi"
- "عبور به ماوراء شعر", means: "Crossing beyond poetry"
- "از مقامات تبتل تا فنا", means: "From the stations of asceticism to the passing away (from self-existence)"
- "سال‌های پایان", means: "The last years"
- "یادداشتها و کتابنامه", means: "Notes and bibliography"

== An excerpt text ==
The following text excerpted from Chapter 9 "From the stations of asceticism to the passing away (from self-existence)":

"Rumi 's" own spiritual conduct was not common among the monks. He did not like the method of the elders of the monastery, who in the guidance of the new disciple pursue the way of hard services such as cleaning the mosque, cooking the food of the Sufis, sewing their torn cloaks, and carrying baskets and begging for their food. He strongly criticized them. He even denied the custom of seclusion, which was common in these monasteries, and to which he himself had tried the custom several times at the insistence of "Sayyid", and apparently, like "Shams" -who called the hermits of the monasteries following the way of "Moses"- he believes the custom in the way "Mohammadi inexistency" was not allowed. He disgusted the way of the traveling dervishes, who amazed the people by performing miraculous deeds. ... He recommended most of the monotheistic conduct. He considered the condition of the past scholars and the wisdom conveyed by them as a practical example and a source of trust for the seekers during their paths. ... He obliged his companions to refrain from any pretense that disturbs the sincerity of action. ... His trainings made the unpretentious seekers and the true aspirant in the way of God, advising them to tolerance and humility, which was the prelude to selflessness and death before death.

— Abdolhossein Zarrinkoob, "Chapter 9", Step by Step Up to Union With God (1980)

== Translation ==
The book "Step by Step Up to Union With God: Life, Thought and Spiritual Journey of Jalal-al-din Rumi" has been translated into English and published in the United States in 2009. It has been translated into Turkish and published in Istanbul, and has been translated into Kurdish and published in Erzurum, Turkey.

== See also ==
- Two Centuries of Silence
- The Hundred Tales of Wisdom
- Understanding Islamic Sciences
- Spiritual Discourses
