= Two Centuries of Silence =

1957 book by Abdolhossein Zarrinkoub

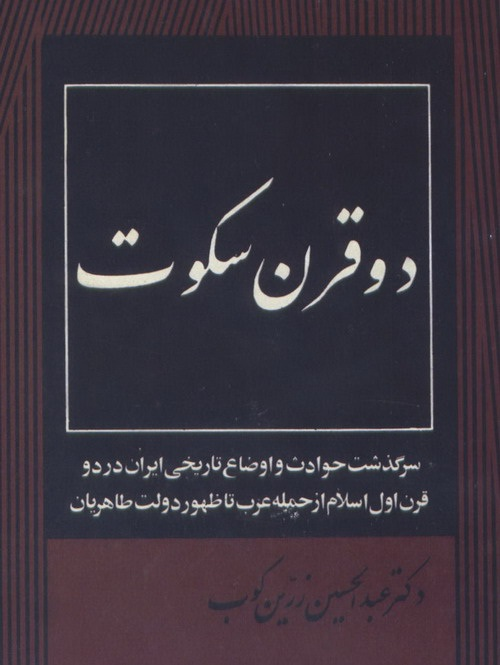
- First edition cover
- Author: Abdolhossein Zarrinkoob
- Original title: دو قرن سکوت; Do Qarn Sokut
- Language: Persian
- Subject: History
- Publisher: Amirkabir Pub., Tehran
- Publication date: 1957
- Publication place: Iran
- Media type: Print (Hardcover & Paperback)

Two Centuries of Silence (Persian: دو قرن سکوت, romanized: Do Qarn Sokut, pronounced [d̪o ɢæɾn soˈkʰuːt̪ʰ]) is a book written in Persian by Abdolhossein Zarrinkoub, a prominent Iranian scholar of Iran's culture, history and literature. The work is a historical account of the events and circumstances of the first two centuries of the Iranian history following the Arab conquest of Iran in the 7th century AD until the rise of the Tahirid dynasty, a Muslim dynasty of native Iranian origin.

Zarrinkoub presents a lengthy discussion on the large flux and influence of the Arabs on the literature, language, culture and society of Persia during the two centuries following the Islamic conquest of Iran. Zarrinkoub discusses how the Arab/Islamic conquest was followed by almost "two centuries of silence" socially, culturally, and politically of native Persians.

In the preface to the second edition of his book, in 1957, Zarinkoob writes, “I picked up my pen and crossed out what was dubious, dark, and incorrect in the first edition. Many such instances were occasions that in the past―either due to immaturity or by prejudice―I had been unable to rightly acknowledge the faults, iniquities, and defeats of Iran." "Now, did I do my duty properly in this revision? I do not know, and I am still of the opinion that the moment a history writer chooses a topic, he has strayed from neutrality."

According to Touraj Daryaee, Two Centuries of Silence "has been the standard book for the Persian audience for the past half a century. It is only recently that new works are being accepted as an alternative to Zarrinkub’s view."

== English translation ==
Two Centuries of Silence has been translated into English by Paul Sprachman (Oct. 5, 2017). In his extensive introductory essay, Sprachman offers an analysis as how Zarrinkub was compelled to change his historical view of Iranian history after the 1979 Revolution The book was earlier translated by Avid Kamgar (Aug. 19, 2016) and published by Oughten House Publications.

== See also ==
- Step by Step Up to Union With God
