= Morteza Motahhari =

Iranian politician (1919–1979)

- مرتضی مطهری
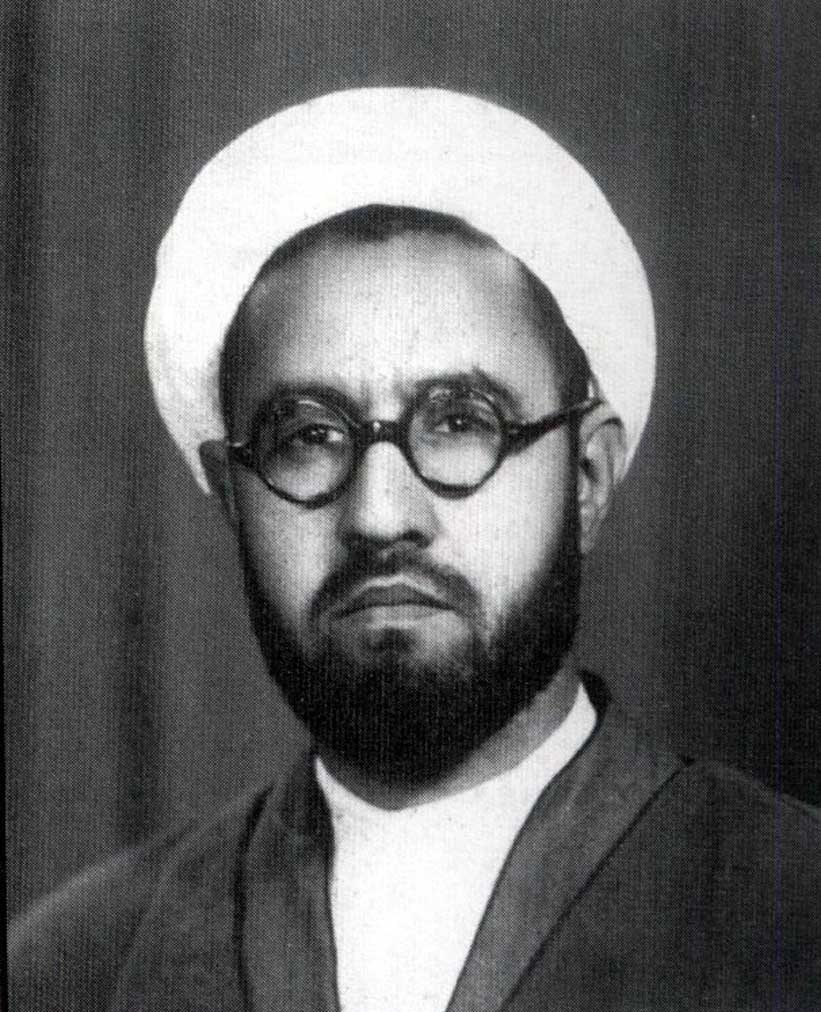

Head of Council of the Islamic Revolution
- In office 12 January 1979 – 1 May 1979
- Appointed by: Ruhollah Khomeini
- Preceded by: Office established
- Succeeded by: Mahmoud Taleghani

Personal details
- Born: 31 January 1919 Fariman, Sublime State of Persia
- Died: 1 May 1979 (aged 60) Tehran, Iran
- Cause of death: Assassination by gunshot
- Resting place: Fatima Masumeh Shrine, Qom
- Party: Combatant Clergy Association (1977–1979); Islamic Coalition (1963–1979)
- Spouse: Azam (Aliyeh) Rouhani
- Children: 7, including Ali Motahhari
- Relatives: Ali Larijani (son-in-law)
- Theological work
- Religion: Islam
- Denomination: Twelver Shīʿā
- School: Jaʿfari
- Main interests: Islamic philosophy
- Years active: 1944–1979
- Alma mater: Qom Seminary; University of Tehran
- Taught at: University of Tehran
- Influenced: Ali Motahari
- Influenced by: Muhammad Husayn Tabataba'i, Ruhollah Khomeini

Morteza Motahhari (Persian: مرتضی مطهری, romanized: Mortezā Motahharī; 31 January 1919 – 1 May 1979) was an Iranian Twelver Shia scholar, philosopher, and lecturer. Motahhari is considered to have an important influence on the ideologies of the Islamic Republic, among others. He was a co-founder of Hosseiniye Ershad and the Combatant Clergy Association (Jāme'e-ye Rowhāniyat-e Mobārez). He was a disciple of Ruhollah Khomeini during the Shah's reign and formed the Council of the Islamic Revolution at Khomeini's request. He was chairman of the council at the time of his assassination.

== Biography ==
=== Early life ===
Motahhari was born in Fariman. His year of birth is uncertain; some sources give it as 1919 and others as 1920. He attended the Hawza of Qom from 1944 to 1952 and then left for Tehran. His grandfather was an eminent religious scholar in the Sistan province and since he traveled with his family to Khorasan Province, there is little information about his origin as Sistanian. His father Shaykh Mohammad Hosseini was also an eminent figure in Fariman, respected by the people. He was considered a pupil of Akhund Khorasani and admired by Ayatollah Mara'shi Najafi.

=== Education ===
At the age of 5, Morteza Motahhari went to school without informing his parents. By the age of twelve he learned the preliminary Islamic sciences from his father. He also went to the seminary of Mashhad and studied for two years there in the school of Abd ul-Khan along with his brother. But his studies remained unfinished in Mashhad seminary because of problems faced by his family which obliged him to return to Fariman to help them.

According to Motahhari's own account, in this period he could study a great number of historical books. It was in this period that he was confronted with questions on worldview such as the problem of God. He considered Agha Mirza Mahdi Shahid Razavi as an eminent master in rational sciences. He decided to go to Qom in 1315 (Solar Hijri calendar).

He finally took up residence in the school of Feyzieh in Qom. He studied the books Kifayah and Makaseb in Shia jurisprudence under the instruction of Ayatollah Sayyed Mohaqeq Yazdi popularly known as Damad. He also participated in the lectures of Hojjat Kooh Kamarehei and sought knowledge from Sadr al-Din al-Sadr, Mohammad Taqi Khansari, Golpaygani, Ahmad Khansari and Najafi Marashi.

When Ayatollah Boroujerdi emigrated to Qom, Motahari could take part in his courses on Principles of Jurisprudence. Ayatollah Montazeri was his classmate in this period.

Later, Motahhari emigrated to Isfahan because of hot climate of Qom. There he became familiar with Haj Ali Agha Shirazi who was the teacher of Nahj al-Balagha in 1320 (Solar Hijri calendar) whom Motahhari always described with honor. Later, he joined the University of Tehran, where he taught philosophy for 22 years. Between 1965 and 1973 he also gave regular lectures at the Hosseiniye Ershad in Northern Tehran. He was also a professor of theology at Tehran University.

Motahhari wrote several books on Islam, Iran, and historical topics. His emphasis was on teaching rather than writing. However, after his death, some of his students worked on writing down his lectures and publishing them as books. As of the mid-2008, the "Sadra Publication" published more than sixty volumes by Motahhari. Nearly 30 books were written about Motahhari or quoted from his speeches.

Morteza Motahhari opposed what he called groups who "depend on other schools, especially materialistic schools" but who present these "foreign ideas with Islamic emblems". In a June 1977 article he wrote to warn "all great Islamic authorities" of the danger of "these external influential ideas under the pretext and banner of Islam." It is thought he was referring to the People's Mujahideen of Iran and the Furqan Group.

Motahhari was the father-in-law of Iran's former secretary of National Security Council Ali Larijani. It was by Motahari's advice that Larijani switched from computer science to Western Philosophy for graduate studies.

A major street in Tehran formerly known as Takhte Tavoos (Peacock Throne) was renamed after him. Morteza Motahari Street connects Sohrevardi Street and Valiasr Street, two major streets in Tehran.

== Activities during the Islamic revolution ==
During the struggle with Shah's regime, Morteza Motahhari contributed in creating new Islamic discourses. Besides, he was among those who had discussed the conditions of Marja' after the death of Ayatollah Broujerdi. He wrote the book Mutual services of Iran and Islam in such a condition. Also his works had an important impact on expanding the movement of religious reform in early days of revolution. His works primarily consisted of traditional Islamic and Shia thoughts. He wrote an essay about revitalization of religious thought in the occasion. Writing the "need for Candidness in religious leadership", he aimed to show the youth the attractiveness of Islam.

== Opinions ==
Morteza Motahhari expressed his opinions in different majors and disciplines such as philosophy, religion, economic, politics, etc. Motahhari and Shariati were counted as two prominent figures during Islamic revolution of Iran. He emphasized on Islamic democracy for suitable political structure.

Motahhari also recognized fitra as the truth of human. According to him, fitra is a permanent and unchangeable quality in human nature. In fact, he believed that fitra played the role of a mediator in God-human beings relation. Also, he believed that Imam was a perfect man who shows the high rank of human spirituality. Imam also is characterized as a religious leader. His lengthy footnote on the "book of principles of philosophy and method of realism" by Muhammad Husayn Tabataba'i was against the historical Marxism. Also he believed that Wali-e faqih only had the right of supervisory not governing. He also maintained that the ruling was one of the political aspect of Imam in society. He maintained that there was no conflict between science and religion since he believed that Science qua science had no conflict and challenge with metaphysics. He believed that the quasi-conflict between science and religion was in terms of their language not themselves.

=== Development ===
Motahhari also expressed views on development and relevant ideology. According to him, freedom, culture and mental-cultural revolution are principles of development. He also refers to some elements for characterizing a developed society. These factors are independence, knowledge and transcendence. Also, according to Motahhari, development originates from cultural self-reliance, purification of cultural sources and logical and cautious communication with west. Motahhari believed in the development of human resources but he also thought that economy was not an aim but only is a condition for development.

=== Equality ===
As outlined by Ayatollah Morteza Motahhari in 1975, the phrase 'equal rights' means something different from what is commonly understood by Western world. He clarified that men and women were innately different and therefore enjoyed different rights, duties and punishments.

In 1966-1967, amidst the growing debate over the Shah's Family Protection Law, he published a series of essays in Zan-e Rooz (Today’s Woman) on subjects such as divorce, inheritance rights, alimony, polygamy, and differences between genders. The "return to shari'a" by Motahhari was a mixed discourse that borrowed from Western ideas whenever they were suitable to his objectives. For example, he condemned those who opposed women's higher education, emphasizing that trained female doctors and surgeons were necessary for the gender-segregated social structure he sought. Additionally, he adopted elements from Protestant charitable practices in the West.

=== Fiqh ===
Motahhari believed that the eternality of Islam is provided by Fiqh. He thought that fiqh along with the character of ijtihad could be an important thing for confronting with the problem of different times and places. Using ijtihad, there is no need to a new prophet.

=== Freedom ===
Motahhari defined freedom as nonexistence of obstacles. According to him, obstacles were of two characters. The first one was that obstacle could limit human and besides counted as a something get human not to do something. In simple word, obstacle could has the dignity of limiting and declining humans. The second one is to thing which decline the perception and introspection of subject in terms of knowledge. According to Motahhari, aside from the realization of putting away obstacles we need to give the spirit of freedom. He analyze the concept of freedom as both right and obligation. He believes that the freedom has necessity for human. Human must be free to choose voluntarily his path. He believes that, contrary to liberalists, inborn right has an ultimate for transcending of human beings.

=== Philosophy of law ===
Motahhari maintains that we have to define the concepts first of all. Therefore, he defines right as a dominance or score on something. According to right the human is merit to possess something and other human ought to respect him. Some of rights are such as the right of parents on their children or the rights of husband and wife in relation to each other. Motahhari divided the right into two groups. First group is existential rights or takwini and the second is religious rights or tashriei. former is a real relation between person and object and the latter determined according to former. He knew the right as a potential score for persons. In fact the right concerned with the priority of somebody on something. He concerned with the question in that is the right and possession predicated on human as such or predicated on human in terms of being in society? He believes that undoubtedly the right existed prior to society. Contrary to John Austin (legal philosopher), Motahhari believes that there is a mutual relation between right and responsibility (Haq va Taklif). Motahhari believes that the natural law theory is a rational one that is of importance for human kind. According to him, the foundation of natural theory of law is to world has a goal and aim finally. On the basis of principle of having goal, the God creates the world for the sake of human kind and they have potential right to change the world therefore human kind have right prior to introducing in society.

=== Philosophy of religion ===
Motahhari refers to the concept of 'maktab' or school when he intends to define the word of religion. According to him maktab is a thoughtful disciplined system including ideology and View in terms of ethics, politics, economy and civil law, etc. Finally, he defines religion as a collection of knowledge bestowed to human for the sake of guiding him and also religion is a collection of beliefs, moralities and individual and collective judgments. Therefore, he knows religion and its teaching as beliefs, moralities and judgments. Also Motahhari believes that the domain of religion at all is not limited to life but concerned with after afterlife. He believes that Islam as a religion is consistent with life of human and there is no room for denying it.

=== Western philosophy ===
Dariush Shayegan believes that Motahhari confused the Hegelian thought and Stace's quotations in confronting with Hegel. According to Shaygan since each of Motahhari and Hegel belong to different paradigms, there is no common world between them.

== Epistemology ==
Motahhari criticized Marxism along with pioneer figures like Ali Shariati. He considered Marxism to be a great threat to youths and the Islamic revolution. Also his commentary on the book of Mulla Sadra influenced many scholars. He placed emphasis on the social, cultural, and historical contingencies of religious knowledge. Motahhari argued that if someone compares fatwas belonging to different jurists while simultaneously considering their respective lives and states of knowledge, then it is clear that the presuppositions of those jurists and their prior insight affected their judgement. He further stated that, because of this reasoning, one observes that the fatwa of an Arab has an Arab flavor and the fatwa belonging to a non-Arab has an Ajam flavor. In addition, he tried to compare the Quran with nature. He also believed that contemporary interpretations of the Quran held more ground than older Islamic interpretations, with the future generation possessing a better understanding and appreciation of the Quran. However, at the same time, he did not believe in epistemological pluralism.

== Assassination and legacy ==
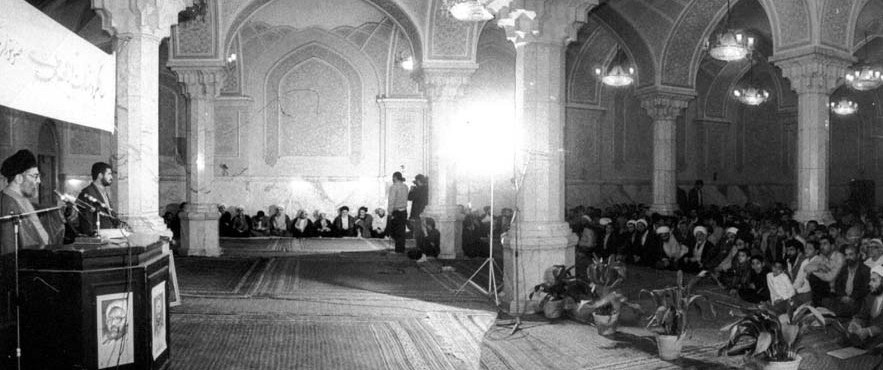
Seyyed Ali Khamenei, Giving Speech in Anniversary of Morteza-Motahari

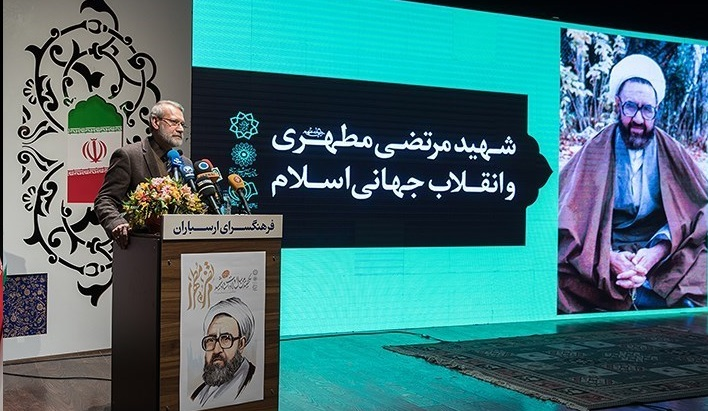
Ali Larijani giving a speech on Motahhari's commemoration (2 February 2020)

On 1 May 1979, Morteza Motahhari was gunned down in Tehran after leaving a late meeting at the house of Yadollah Sahabi. The Forqan Group claimed responsibility for the assassination. The alleged assassin was the group's founder, Akbar Goudarzi.

=== Teachers' Day (Motahhari's death) ===
On the occasions of Motahhari's death, 12-Ordibehesht (the second month of the Solar Hijri calendar) has been named at the calendar of Islamic Republic of Iran as "Teachers' Day". An honoring of "Teachers' Day" is held annually in Iran for a week.

== Museum ==
In 1946, due to the establishment of Hosseinieh Ershad and with the insistence of his friends to get closer to Hosseinieh, he moved to Dolat Street, Gholhak neighborhood. During his 9 years of residence in this house (from 1946 to 1955), which had the longest time compared to the rest of his years of residence in Tehran, he wrote most of his works in this house. The house is built on two floors, on the first floor of which are the manuscripts and personal belongings of Shahid Motahari and on the second floor are the books of that martyr. The Shahid Motahari Museum was established in 2007. Identifying, collecting, organizing, introducing and preserving the works of the master is one of the main goals of becoming a museum of this historical house. Providing a suitable space and environment for researchers who intend to study the works of Master Motahhari has also been one of the reasons for reading the second floor of this house. Holding seminars and meetings on the subject of the master's works is one of the most important group programs of this museum house, which is held several times during the year.

== Awards ==
- UNESCO Award, 1965.

== Works/Publications ==
He "authored over fifty books, which dealt with theology and philosophy as well as practical issues such as sexual ethics, usury, and insurance", some of which include:

- Tawhid (Monotheism)
- Morteza, Motahhari (2001). Light Within Me. Ansariyan Publications. p. 368. ISBN 978-9-644-38301-4.
- Morteza, Motahhari (2003). Les droits de la femme en Islam. Séminaire islamique de Paris. ISBN 978-2-950-51575-9.
- Morteza, Motahhari (1985). Fundamentals of Islamic Thought: God, Man, and the Universe. Mizan Press. p. 235. ISBN 978-0-933-78215-0.
- Adl -e- Elahi (Divine Justice)
- Nubuwwah (Prophet-hood)
- Ma'ad (The Return, a book on Islamic eschatology)
- Hamase -e- Husaini (Husaynian Epic)
- Seiry dar nahj al-balagha (A Journey through Nahj al-Balagha)
- Seiry dar sirey'e a'emeye at-har (A Journey through the Conduct of the Purified Imams)
- Seiry dar sirey'e nabavi (A Journey through the Prophetic Conduct)
- Insan -e- Kamel (The Complete Human)
- Payambar -e- Ommi (The Uneducated Prophet)
- Osool -e Falsafa va ravesh -e- Realism (The Principles of Philosophy and the Method of Realism)
- Sharh -e- Manzume (An exegesis on Mulla Hadi Sabzavari's versified summary of Mulla Sadra's Transcendent theosophy)
- Imamat va rahbary (Imamate and Leadership)
- Dah Goftar (A collection of 10 essays by Motahari)
- Bist Goftar (A collection of 20 essays by Motahari)
- Panzdah Goftar (A collection of 15 essays by Motahari)
- Morteza, Motahhari (1986). Azadi -e- Ma'navi. Muslim Students' Association. p. 118. ISBN 978-0-961-68970-4. (Spiritual Discourses)
- Ashneya'ei ba Quran (An Introduction to the Qur'an)
- Ayande -e- Enghlab -e- Islami (The Future of the Islamic Revolution)
- Dars -e- Qur'an (Lesson of Qur'an)
- Ehyaye Tafakor -e- Islami (Revival of Islamic Thinking)
- Akhlagh -e- Jensi (Sexual Ethics)
- Islam va niazha -ye- jahan (Islam and the Demands of the Modern World)
- Emdadhaye gheibi dar zendegi -e- bashar (Hidden Aids in Human Life)
- Ensan va sarnevesht (Man and Destiny)
- Panj maghale (Five Essays)
- Ta'lim va tarbiyat dar Islam (Education in Islam)
- Jazebe va dafe'eye Ali (Ali's Attraction and Repulsion)
- Jehad (The Holy War of Islam and Its Legitimacy in the Quran)
- Hajj (Pilgrimage)
- Hekmat-ha va andarz-ha (Wisdoms and Warnings)
- Khatemiyat (The Doctrine of the Seal of Prophethood by Muhammad)
- Khatm -e- Nobowat (The Seal of Prophethood)
- Khadamāt-e moteqābel-e Eslām va Īrān (Islam and Iran: A Historical Study of Mutual Services). A 750-pages book where he shows how Iran and Islam benefited each other. He also said that we can't reject nationalism as a whole: "Nationalism should not be condemned categorically, and when it conveys positive qualities, it leads to solidarity, good relations, and common welfare among those we live with. It is neither irrational nor is it contrary to Islam."
- Dastan -e- Rastan (Anecdotes of Pious Men)
- Darshaye Asfar
- Shesh maghale (Six Essays)
- Erfan -e- Hafez
- Elale gerayesh be madigary
- Fetrat
- Falsafe -ye- Akhlagh (Ethics)
- Falsafe -ye- Tarikh (Philosophy of History)
- Ghiam va enghelab -e- Mahdi
- Koliyat -e- olume Islami (Understanding Islamic Sciences)
- Goft o gooye chahar janebe
- Masaleye Hejab (Problem of Hijab)
- Masaleye Reba
- Masaleye Shenakht
- Maghalate falsafi (A selection of Philosophical articles written by Motahari)
- Moghadameyi bar jahanbiniye Islami (Consists of 6 different books written about this subject)
- Nabard -e- hagh va batel
- Nezam -e- hoghoghe zan dar Islam
- Nazari bar nezame eghtesadiye Islam
- Naghdi bar Marxism (A critic on Marxism)
- Nehzat-haye Islami dar 100 sale akhir
- Sexual Ethics in Islam and in the Western World (English)
- Vela'ha va velayat-ha
- Azadegi
- Ayineye Jam (Interpretation of poetry of Hafez)

== See also ==
- Modern Islamic philosophy
- Mohammad Taghi Falsafi
- Syed Jawad Naqvi
- Mohammad Beheshti

== References and notes ==
Political offices
Preceded by None	President of Council of Islamic Revolution; 1979	Succeeded by Mahmoud Taleghani
