= Understanding Islamic Sciences =

Book about Islamic sciences

- Author: Morteza Motahhari
- Original title: آشنایی با علوم اسلامی کلیات علوم اسلامی
- Language: Persian; English; Urdu; Spanish
- Series: 3 Volumes
- Subject: Islamic sciences (philosophy, theology, mysticism, morality, jurisprudence and Islamic law)
- Genre: Educational; Lecture
- Publisher: Sadra (Persian editions), Saqi Books; ICAS Press; Al-Mustafa; (English editions)
- Publication date: 1979
- Publication place: Iran
- English publication date: 2002
- Website: lib.motahari.ir

Understanding Islamic Sciences (Persian: آشنایی با علوم اسلامی or Persian: کلیات علوم اسلامی) is a book which contains Morteza Motahhari's essential lectures and articles on Islamic sciences (logic and philosophy, theology, mysticism, practical wisdom, principles of jurisprudence and Fiqh).

== Contents ==
Understanding Islamic Sciences consists of three volumes, the first of which includes two sections of logic and philosophy, the second volume contains three sections of theology, mysticism and practical wisdom, and the third volume contains two sections of the principles of Islamic jurisprudence and Fiqh. The author intends to make a general plan about Islamic sciences. The author Morteza Motahhari, explains that Islam is a comprehensive and all-encompassing religion, a religion that is not limited to a series of moral and personal advice, is a community-building religion. He says that Islamic culture itself is a special culture among the cultures of the world, with a special spirit and a series of special characteristics. It has originality and independent personality and has a special spirit and life. This book has been compiled for those who want to get acquainted with Islamic teachings and an attempt has been made to establish simplicity and brevity at the same time as accuracy in this series.

An important feature of the book Understanding Islamic Sciences is the form of the Motahhari's lectures. This series of discussions and lectures was for the first year students of the Faculty of Theology and Islamic Studies of the University of Tehran, written understandable expression for beginners and for people with low acquaintance with complex Islamic sciences terms. The text of the book is easy for who not familiar with Islam, and has become very easy for understanding through the categorization of materials and the description of terms.

=== Logic ===
The logic is the law to think correctly. That is, the rules of logic are a scale and a tool that whenever we want to think and argue about some scientific or philosophical issues, we must weigh our reasoning with these scales and criteria so that we do not draw wrong conclusions. Logic is a tool of the type of rule and law that observing and applying it keeps the mind from making mistakes in thinking. The benefit of logic is to prevent the mind from making mistakes in thinking. Thinking is the movement of the mind from an unknown ideal to a series of known premise, and then the movement from that known premise to that desirable to transform it into the known. Logic explains to us that prior mental information will only be productive if it is shaped by logical rules. Logic is merely a tool of measurement, that is, it opens the right and the wrong.

=== Philosophy ===
If we compare the world to an organ, we see that our study of this organ is of two kinds: some of our studies are related to the details of this organ, such as the head or the hand or the foot or the eye of this organ, but some of our studies are related to the whole organ, such as when did this organ come into being and how long does it last? And does basically have a meaning about the whole organ or not? Does this organ have a real unity and the plurality of members is an apparent and unreal plurality, or its unity is a credit? Does this organ as a whole pursue a goal and flow towards perfection and truth, or is it an aimless and aimless being? The part of the study that deals with the whole organ of the world is "philosophy".

=== Theology ===
Kalam or Islamic scholastic theology is a science that discusses Islamic beliefs, that is, what one should believe in from the point of view of Islam, in a way that explains, argues, and defends them. The section of beliefs, that is, the issues and teachings that must be known and believed in, such as the issue of monotheism, the attributes of the essence of transcendence, public and private prophecy, and some other issues belongs to Kalam science. The rational part of Kalam is issues whose preambles are taken only from the intellect, and in such matters it is not enough to cite quotations (books and traditions), only the intellect must be used. The narrated part of Kalam is issues whose, although it is one of the principles of religion and should be believed in, but since these issues are a subset of prophecy, not preceded by prophecy, it is enough to prove the matter through divine revelation or the definite words of the Prophet.

=== Mysticism ===
Mysticism as a scientific and cultural system in Islam, has two parts: the practical part and the theoretical part. The practical part is the part that expresses and explains man's relations and duties with himself, with the world and with God. Mysticism in this area is like ethics, that is, it is a practical "science". In this part of mysticism, it is explained where the seeker should start in order to reach the pinnacle of humanity, ie monotheism, and what houses and stages he should go through in order, and what happens to him in the houses along the way. And what imports are made on him. Theoretical part of mysticism interprets existence, discusses God, the world, and man. Mysticism in this part is like the divine philosophy which is in the position of interpretation and explanation of existence.

The last destination of the mystic journey and behavior is the monotheism. The monotheism of the mystic, that is, the real being is unique to God, there is no manifestation of anything except God. The monotheism of the mystic means that there is nothing but God. The monotheism of the mystic means to see nothing but God during the journey and reaching the stage. This means that everything you see along the way, including the events, words and deeds of the people, are all and all the sounds and images that God has sent to you, and the world is a screen that gives you His message. This stage of monotheism is not approved by the opponents of mystics and it may be called blasphemy and atheism, but mystics believe that this is the true monotheism and other levels of monotheism are not free from polytheism. According to mystics, reaching this stage is not the work of intellect and thought, it is the work of the heart, struggle, journey, conduct and purification.

=== Practical wisdom ===
Practical wisdom is the knowledge of human duties and responsibilities; That is, it is assumed that man has a series of duties and responsibilities not in terms of law, whether divine or human law - which is another story - but in terms of pure human wisdom. Those who believe in practical wisdom believe that man has a series of duties and tasks which are practical wisdom and intellect and wisdom can discover them.

=== Jurisprudence ===
Principles of Islamic jurisprudence or Islamic Law or Fiqh; "Fiqh" or "Jurisprudence" in the word means understanding, but deep understanding. The most important science that needs to be learned in the introduction of jurisprudence is the science of "principles of jurisprudence", which is a sweet science and one of the innovative sciences of Muslims. The science of principles is, in fact, the "science of the order of inference". This science teaches us the correct method of inferring from the sources of jurisprudence in jurisprudence. Hence, the science of principles, like the science of logic, is a "grammatical" science and is closer to "art" than "science", that is, in this science, we talk about a series of "musts" and not about a series of "is". The sources of jurisprudence from the Shiite point of view are four things: Book of God: Quran, Sunnah: means the words, deeds and narrations of the Prophet or Imams, Ijma and reason.

== Volumes ==
The book was first published in Persian in three volumes in 1979 in Iran, entitled:

- Understanding Islamic Sciences (logic, philosophy) (Persian: آشنائى با علوم اسلامى (منطق ، فلسفه)), 1st volume
- Understanding Islamic Sciences (theology, mysticism, practical wisdom) (Persian: آشنایى با علوم اسلامى (کلام ، عرفان ، حکمت عملى)), 2nd volume
- Understanding Islamic Sciences (Principles of jurisprudence - jurisprudence) (Persian: آشنایی با علوم اسلامی (اصول فقه - فقه)), 3rd volume

This trilogy series was reprinted more than 70 times in Iran. Of course, the title of these three volumes was changed to Generalities of Islamic Sciences (Persian: کلیات علوم اسلامی) in 2005.

== English editions ==
In English edition, all these topics were collected in a book and published as a volume entitled Understanding Islamic Sciences: Philosophy, Theology, Mysticism, Morality, Jurisprudence. The English edition published in 2002 by ICAS Press (Islamic College for Advanced Studies Pub. (UK)) and Saqi Books in London. Another English translation was published in Tehran in 2014 by Al-Mustafa International Publication and Translation Center.

== See also ==
- The Principles of Philosophy and the Method of Realism
- Spiritual Discourses
- Sexual Ethics in Islam and in the Western World
- Anecdotes of pious men
- Atlas of Shia
- Hadiqat al Haqiqa
- Reflection on the Ashura movement
- Step by Step Up to Union With God
