= Hosseiniyeh Ershad =

Iranian religious institute

- حسینیه ارشاد
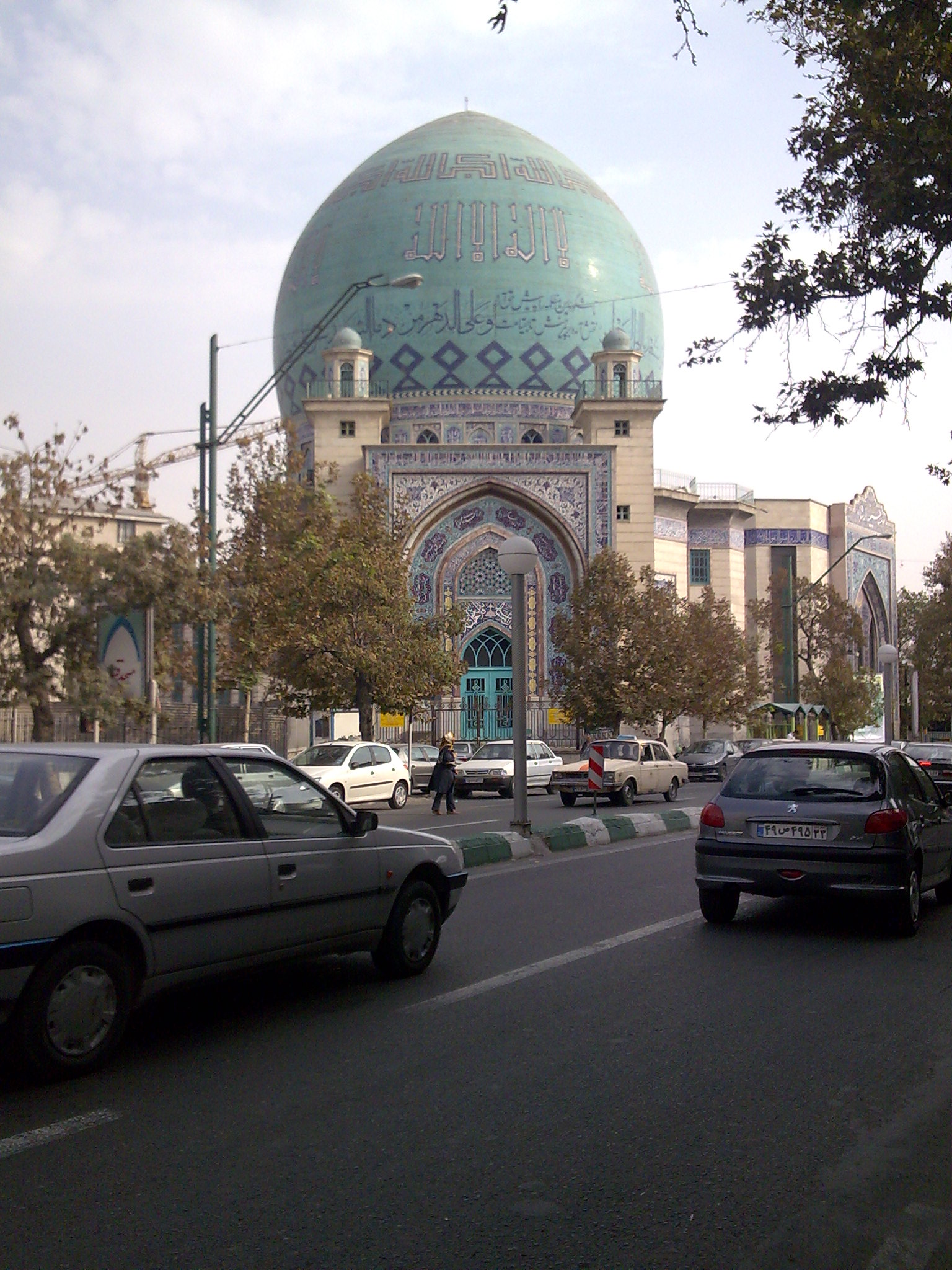
- The main facade of the center, facing Shariati Ave.

Religion
- Affiliation: Shia Islam
- Ecclesiastical or organizational status: Husayniyya
- Status: Active

Location
- Location: Shariati Ave, Tehran
- Country: Iran
- Geographic coordinates: 35.7567°N 51.4482°E

The Hosseinieh Ershad or Hosseiniyeh Ershad (Persian: حسینیه ارشاد) is a prominent cultural and religious institution located on Shariati Avenue in Tehran, Iran. Established in the early 1960s, it was designed to serve as a non-traditionalist venue for lectures and discussions on history, culture, society, and religion, appealing to an educated audience compared to traditional mosques.

== Etymology ==
- A hosseiniyeh is a Shia commemorative institution dedicated to Imam Hossein.
- ارشاد, ershad is a term meaning 'guidance'. It is borrowed into Persian from Arabic.

== History ==
Hosseiniyeh Ershad was founded in the early 1960s by Nasser Minachi, who envisioned it as a center for intellectual and cultural discourse. The institution quickly gained prominence due to its non-traditionalist approach, offering lectures and discussions on a variety of topics.

During the late 1960s and early 1970s, the center became a focal point for revolutionary activities against the Pahlavi government. Ali Shariati, a Sorbonne-educated sociologist and one of the most influential Islamic intellectuals of the 20th century, delivered many of his renowned lectures at the institution, attracting a large following among students and intellectuals. Shariati's speeches were instrumental in shaping revolutionary thought and the Islamic revival movement in Iran.

In 1972, the Pahlavi government shut down Hosseiniyeh Ershad due to its political activities. However, after the Iranian Revolution in 1979, it reopened and has since continued to serve as a hub for cultural and religious education. Its library, which contained approximately 60,000 volumes and 350 periodical subscriptions as of the early 1990s, remains a significant resource for students, researchers, and the local community.

== Public speakers ==
Hosseiniyeh Ershad has been a platform for many influential figures to address the public on topics related to culture, religion, and society. Some of the most notable speakers include:

- Ali Shariati: A sociologist and Islamic intellectual who gave groundbreaking lectures at the institution during the late 1960s and early 1970s, inspiring revolutionary thought among Iran's youth.
- Morteza Motahhari: A prominent Islamic scholar and philosopher whose talks at Hosseiniyeh Ershad emphasized the importance of Islamic principles in modern society.
- Nasser Minachi: The founder of Hosseiniyeh Ershad, who frequently spoke about the importance of intellectual freedom and cultural dialogue.

The institution continues to host lectures by contemporary scholars, intellectuals, and public figures, making it a vital venue for cultural and religious dialogue in Tehran.

== See also ==
- Husayniyya
- Ali Shariati
- Iranian Revolution
