= Abdolhossein Zarrinkoob =

Iranian professor of Persian culture and literature (1923–1999)

Abdulhussein Zarrinkoub عبدالحسین زرین‌کوب
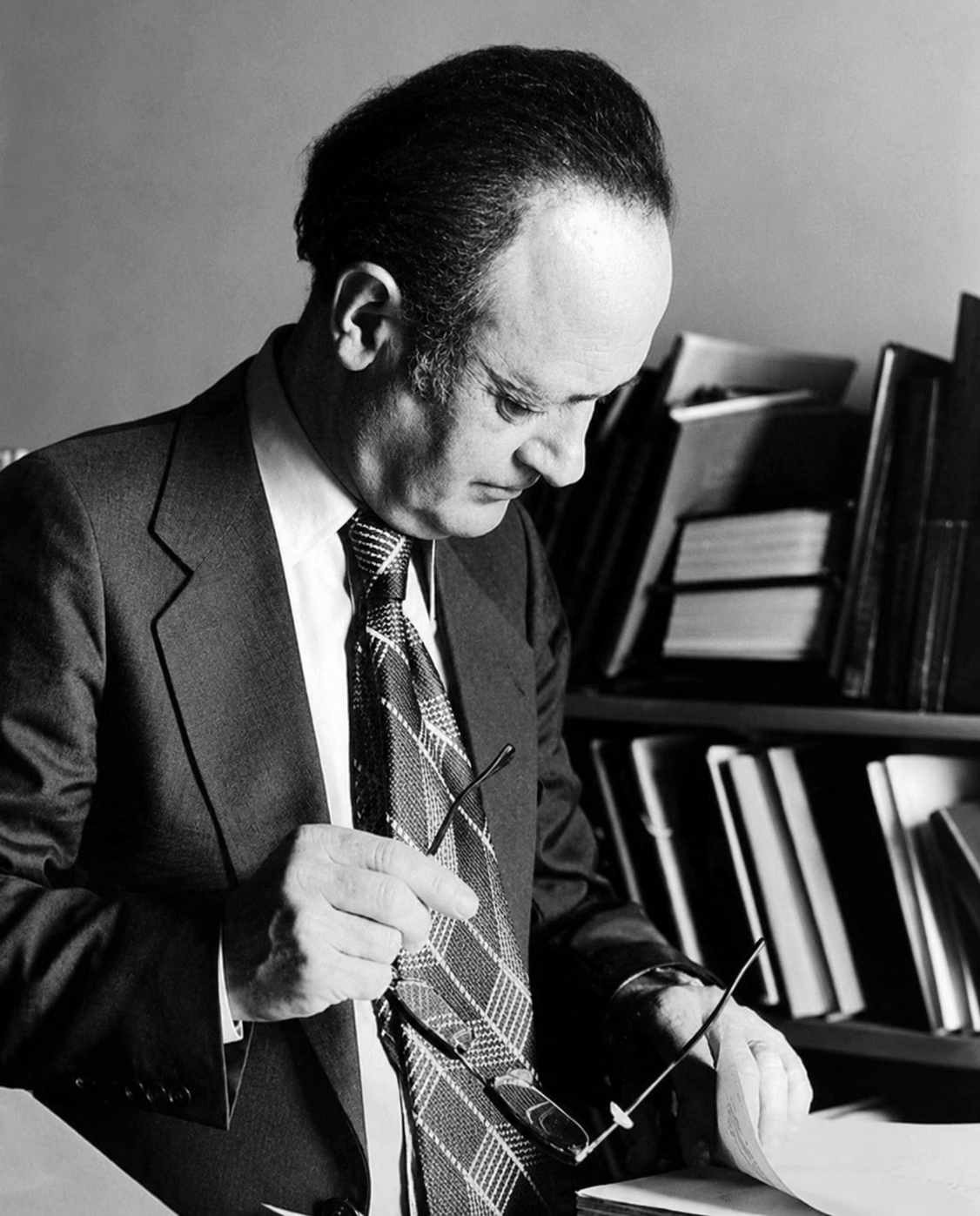
- Abdolhossein Zarrinkoub
- Born: 21 March 1923; Borujerd, Sublime State of Iran
- Died: 15 September 1999 (aged 76); Tehran, Iran
- Known for: scholar of Iranian literature, history of literature, Persian culture and history
- Notable work: Two Centuries of Silence
- Spouse: Ghamar Ariyan

Abdolhossein Zarrinkoub (Luri/Persian: عبدالحسین زرین‌کوب, also Romanized as Zarrinkoub, Zarrinkub, Persian pronunciation: [æbdolhoˈsejn zæɾ[ɾ]iːnˈkuːb]; 21 March 1923 – 15 September 1999) was a scholar and professor of Iranian literature, history of literature, Persian culture and history.

He was born in Borujerd, Iran, received his PhD from Tehran University in 1955 under the supervision of Badiozzaman Forouzanfar, and held faculty positions at universities such as Oxford University, Sorbonne and Princeton University.

== Research works ==
Some of his works in English are:

- The Arab Conquest of Iran and its aftermath: in Cambridge History of Iran, Vol. 4, London, 1975.
- "Sufism in its historical perspective", Iranian studies III, 1970, p. 137-220
- Nizami, a Lifelong Quest for a Utopia, 1977, Rome.

=== Literary criticism and comparative literature ===
Zarrinkoob wrote a book called "Naqd-e Adabi" (نقد ادبی, "Literary Criticism") covering comparative literature and Persian literary criticism.

=== Rumi and Erfan ===
Zarrinkoub also wrote about the Persian poet Molana Jalaleddin Balkhi (Rumi) and his works. Zarrinkoub's "Serr-e Ney" (سرّ نی, "Secret of the Reed"), "Pelleh-Pelleh ta Molaqat-e Khuda" (پله‌پله تا ملاقات خدا, "Step by Step until Visiting God") and "Bahr dar Koozeh" (بحر در کوزه, "Sea in a Jug") are critiques and comparative analyses of Rumi's Masnavi.

Zarrinkoub's research works on Hafez and Persian mysticism resulted in several books including "Az Kuche-ye Rendan" (از کوچهٔ رندان) and "Arzesh-e Miras-e Sufiyeh" (ارزش میراث صوفیه).

=== History of Persia ===
Zarrinkoub wrote "Two Centuries of Silence" (دو قرن سکوت) on Islamic history and Ruzegaran (روزگاران) (The Ages) (Iran's history from the beginning to the fall of the Pahlavi dynasty), which covers the 3,000-year history of Iran since the Aryans migrated to the Iranian plateau.

== See also ==
- Persian literature
- Iranology
- Intellectual Movements in Iran
