= Anecdotes of pious men =

1960 book by Morteza Motahhari

- 1993 English version
- Author: Morteza Motahhari
- Subject: Moral Short Stories
- Publication date: 1960

Anecdotes of pious men (Persian: داستان راستان) is a book by Morteza Motahhari. It is an ethical fiction published in English by Ansariyan in 1993.

== Narrative ==
It is based on historical short story of Islamic references. The book has two volumes, and it contains collections of 125 ethical fiction. Each volume of the book has 75 works of fiction with an ethical theme. The original book was Persian and Saba Zehra Naqavi has translated it to English. Khadim Husayn Naqavi has edited it too.

== Awards ==
Anecdotes of pious men won UNESCO Award, in 1965.

== Publication ==
The book was launched in Iran in 1960. The book was translated to Spanish and Japanese.

== TV program adaptation ==
A TV adaptation by Akbar Hor and Huoshang Pakravan was broadcast on IRIB 1 in 1981-1982.

== See also ==
- Understanding Islamic Sciences
- Spiritual Discourses
- Battle of Khorramshahr
- Chess with the Doomsday Machine
- Eternal Fragrance
- Noureddin, Son of Iran
- That Which That Orphan Saw
- Fortune Told in Blood
- Journey to Heading 270 Degrees
