= Faculty of Theology and Islamic Studies of the University of Tehran =

Faculty of University of Tehran, Iran

- دانشکده الهیات و معارف اسلامی دانشگاه تهران
- Type: Public
- Established: 1935
- Parent institution: University of Tehran
- Chairman: Mahmood Vaezi
- Location: No.47, Mutahhari St., Tehran, Iran; 35.7255°N 51.4284°E
- Language: Persian
- Website: ftis.ut.ac.ir/en/

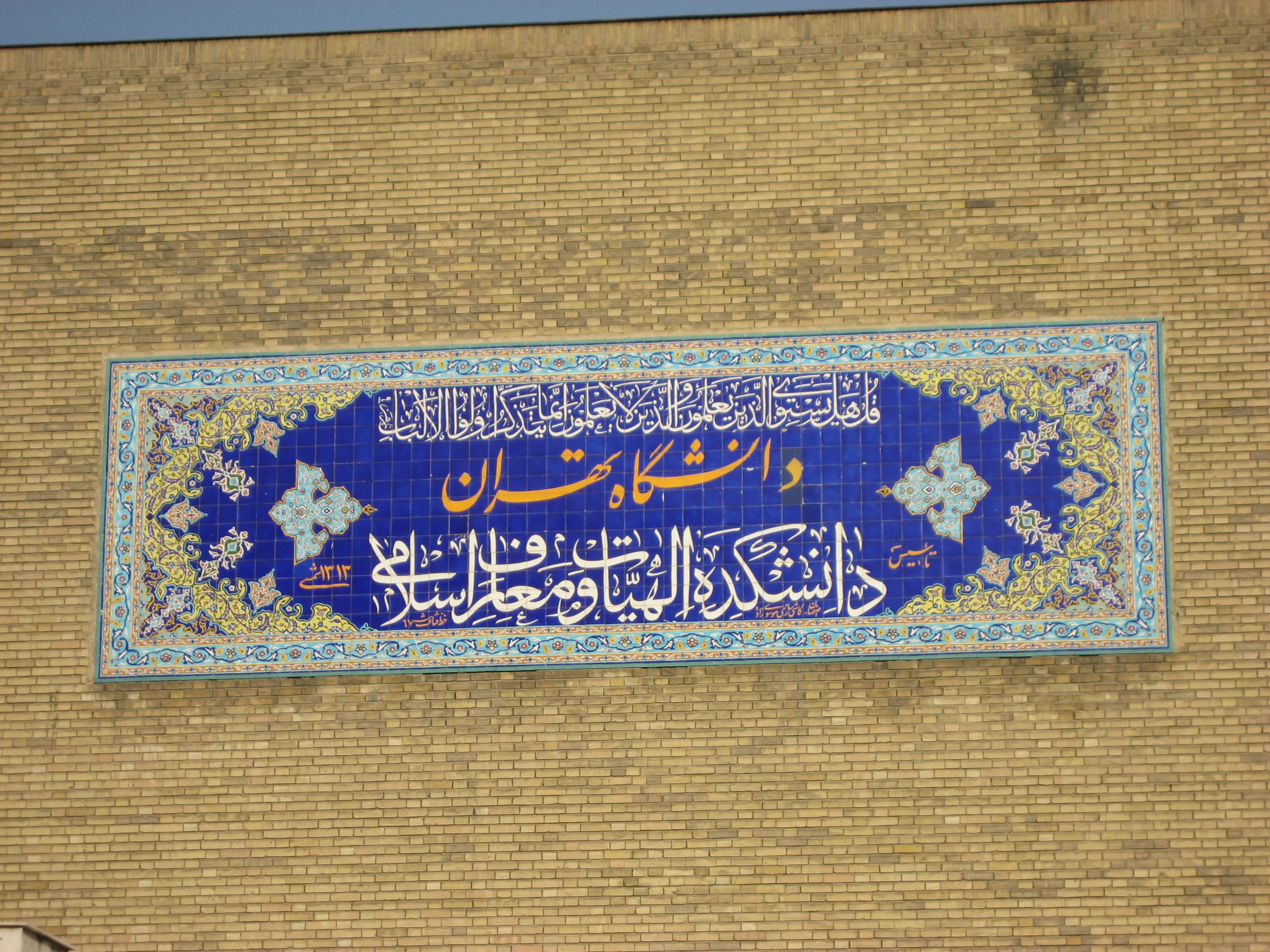
Logo of Faculty of Theology and Islamic Studies on the wall

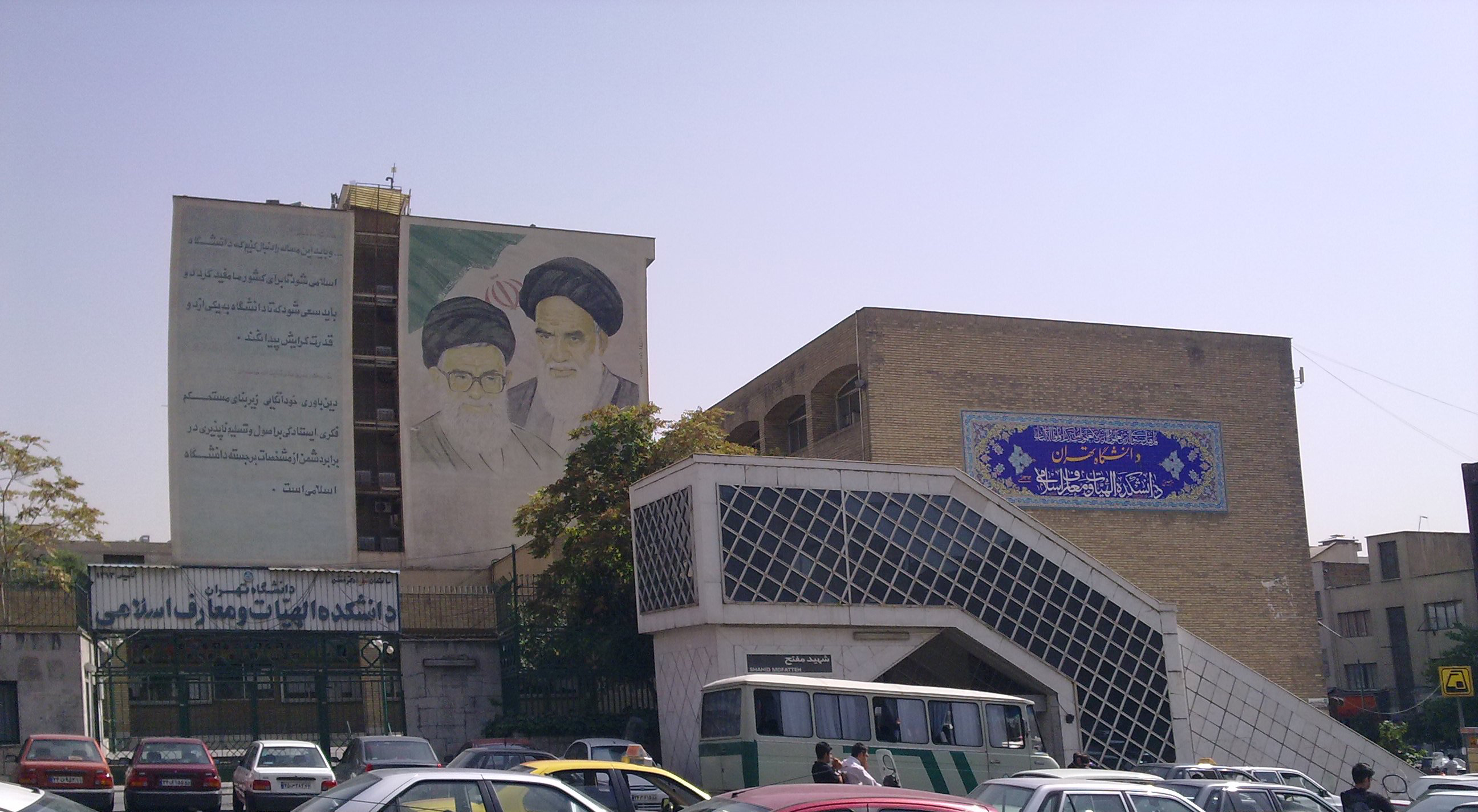
The main door of the Faculty of Theology and Islamic Studies

The Faculty of Theology and Islamic Studies (Persian: دانشکده الهیات و معارف اسلامی دانشگاه تهران) is one of the faculties of the University of Tehran, which was established in 1935.

== History ==
The Faculty of Theology and Islamic Studies of University of Tehran was established in 1935 at the Sepahsalar College building presently known as Shahid Motahari University, under the name of Faculty of Theoretical and Traditional Studies with three disciplines of Arabic literature, Theoretical studies, and Traditional studies. This period lasted for five years and in 1940 the faculty was closed. The activity of the faculty was resumed in 1943 at the campus of the Iranian Academy with two disciplines of Theoretical studies and Traditional studies and it was gradually developed and two other disciplines named Arabic language and literature and Islamic culture were added to it. Also, PhD programs were offered in two fields of Theoretical studies and Traditional studies. In 1965, the faculty's name Faculty of Theoretical and Traditional Studies was changed to the Faculty of Theology and Islamic Studies. In 1978, the faculty was moved to the current building. At present, the faculty has 8 departments of study with more than 24 undergraduate, graduate and doctoral programs with over 120 faculty members. The faculty of theology and Islamic studies is one of the world’s top academic institutions focusing on Islamic and comparative religious studies from Islamic history, mysticism and philosophy to Quranic sciences, Hadith and Shia jurisprudence, as well as work ethics.

== Educational groups ==
The Faculty of Theology and Islamic Studies of University of Tehran has eight educational groups consists of six departments and two centers which offers fields and degrees as below:

- Faculty of Theology and Islamic Studies
  - Departments
    - Religious Studies Department
      - Programs
        - Theology and Islamic Studies
        - Religion and Mysticism
      - Degrees
        - Bachelor
        - Master
        - PhD
    - Islamic History and Muslim civilization Department
      - Programs
        - Theology and Islamic Studies
        - The History of Civilization of Islamic Nations
      - Degrees
        - Bachelor
        - Master
        - PhD
    - Qur'an and Hadith Studies Department
      - Programs
        - Theology and Islamic Studies
        - Quranic Sciences and Hadith
      - Degrees
        - Bachelor
        - Master
        - PhD
    - Islamic Law Department
      - Programs
        - Theology and Islamic Studies
        - Jurisprudence and the Foundation of Islamic Law
      - Degrees
        - Bachelor
        - Master
        - PhD
    - Shaafei Law Department
      - Programs
        - Shaafei Jurisprudence
      - Degrees
        - Bachelor
        - Master
        - PhD
    - Islamic Philosophy and Theology (KALAM) Department
      - Programs
        - Theology and Islamic Studies
        - Philosophy and Islamic Kalam
      - Degrees
        - Bachelor
        - Master
        - PhD
  - Centers
    - Center for Philosophy of Religion
      - Programs
        - Philosophy of Religion
      - Degrees
        - Master
    - Center for the History of Science
      - Programs
        - History of Science
          - Orientations
            - Mathematics in the Islamic World
            - Astronomy in the Islamic World
            - Physics in the Islamic World
            - Pharmacy in the Islamic World
      - Degrees
        - Master

== Organizational structure ==
The Faculty of Theology and Islamic Studies organizational structure consists of the Presidency and the main five Deputies as below:

- Faculty of Theology and Islamic Studies
  - Presidency
    - The highest position of the faculty who holds the office for four years
      - Office of the President
      - Public Relations Affairs
  - Deputies
    - Education and Postgraduate Studies Deputy
      - Deputy Office
      - Office of Educational Services and Graduate Studies
      - E-learning Office
      - Educational Groups and Departments
        - Religious Studies
        - Islamic History and Muslim civilization
        - Qur'an and Hadith Studies
        - Islamic Law
        - Shaafei Law
        - Islamic Philosophy and Theology (KALAM)
        - Philosophy of Religion
        - History of Science
    - Research Deputy
      - Deputy Office
      - Experts
      - Library
      - Website and ICT
      - Publication
    - Student and Cultural Deputy
      - Deputy Office
      - Experts
      - Martyrs and Sacrificers Students Affairs
      - Advisory Office
    - Administrative and Financial Deputy
      - Deputy Office
      - Accounting
      - Administrative Affairs and Support
      - Secretariat
    - International Deputy
      - International Relations Affairs
      - International Students Affairs

== Eminent alumni ==
Some eminent scholars who graduated from the Faculty of Theology and Islamic Studies of University of Tehran:

- Badiozzaman Forouzanfar
- Morteza Motahhari
- Mohammad Mohammadi-Malayeri
- Mohammad Mofatteh
- Mohammad Beheshti
- Mohammad-Javad Bahonar
- Alireza Feyz
- Hossein Elahi Ghomshei
- Mehrdad Avesta
- Mohammad Hosseini
- Hamid Aboutalebi
- Mahmoud Khatami
- Mohammad Taqi Danesh Pajouh
- Jalal Jalalizadeh
- Abbas Zaryab
- Hassan Ameli
- Abdoldjavad Falaturi
- Ahmad Mahdavi Damghani
- Nadia Maftouni
- Keyhan Hashemnia

== Library ==
The library of the Faculty of Theology and Islamic Studies is one of the richest libraries in fields of Islamic studies in the world and has more than 130,000 volumes of books in Persian, Arabic, and Latin languages.

- Faculty of Theology and Islamic Studies
  - The Library
    - Books
      - Persian Language
        - 42115 Volumes
      - English Language
        - 1067 Volumes
      - Arabic Language
        - 54518 Volumes
      - Other Languages
        - 386 Volumes
    - Journals
      - Persian Language
        - 270 Titles
      - English Language
        - 56 Titles
      - Other Languages
        - 88 Titles

== See also ==
- College of Science, University of Tehran
- Faculty of Letters and Humanities of the University of Tehran
- Tehran School of Political Science
- Institute of Biochemistry and Biophysics
