= Fathollah Mojtabaei =

Iranian author and historian

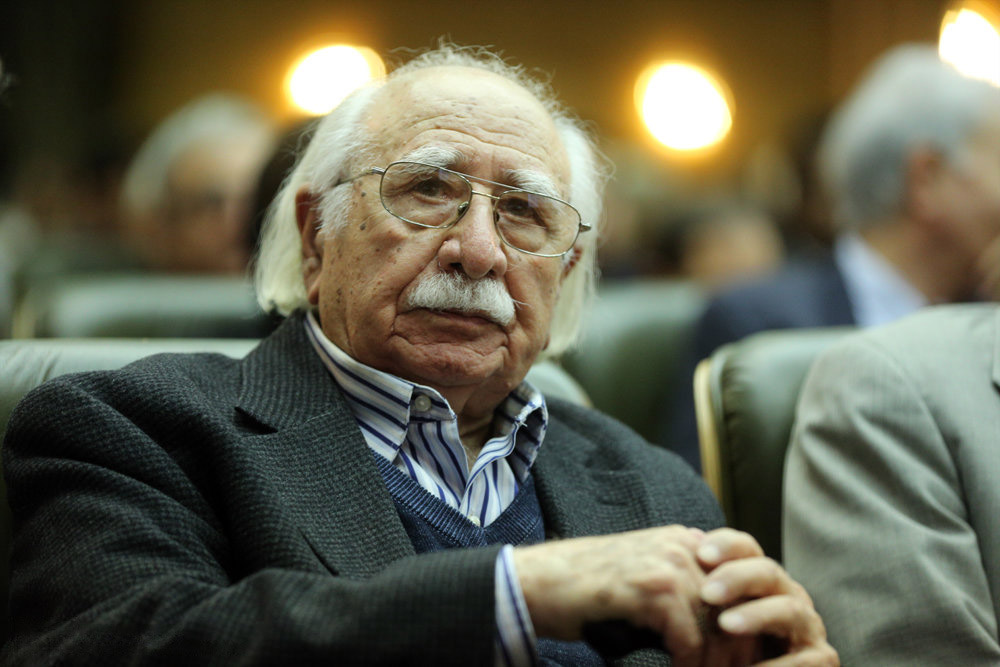
- Born: December 10, 1927 (age 98); Tehran, Iran
- Education: Bachelor in English Language and Literature; Masters in Comparative History of Religions; PhD in History of Eastern Religions and Philosophy
- Alma mater: Faculty of Letters and Humanities of the University of Tehran; Harvard University
- Occupations: Author; Translator; Cultural counselor; Historian of Eastern Religions and Philosophy
- Awards: First Order of Persian Literature; Iranian Science and Culture Hall of Fame

Fathollah Mojtabaei (Persian: فتح‌الله مجتبایی; born December 10, 1927, Tehran) is an Iranian author and historian. He is a permanent member of Academy of Persian Language and Literature and a member of the faculty of the Center for the Great Islamic Encyclopedia.

== Early life ==
Dr. Fathollah Mojtabaei was born on December 10, 1927, in Tehran, Iran. A few months after his birth, his mother took him to Farahan County, Markazi Province, Iran. He stayed in Farahan until he was fourteen. His father and his grandfather were Sufi elders. He received his basic education in such a family, which led him to study the history of religions and philosophy of the East and India later.

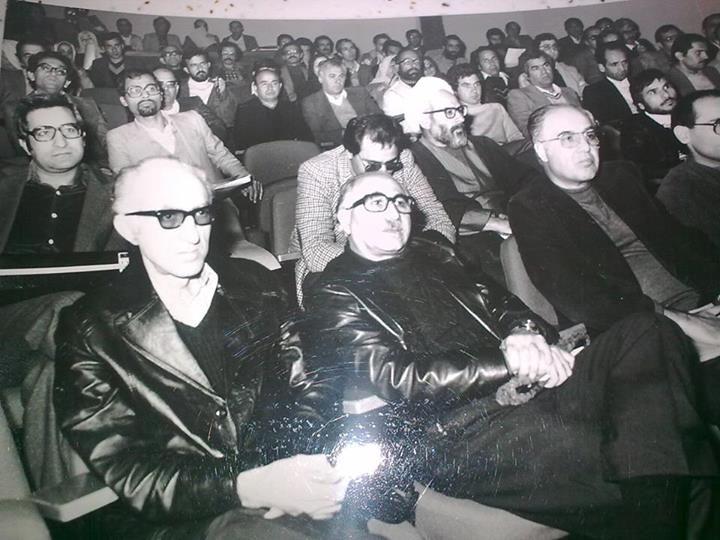
First row second person: Fathollah Mojtabaei – 1982

== Education and career ==
Until the age of fourteen, he taught basics of literature, formal sciences and French language in Farahan County. In 1941, he came to Arak and entered high school there. After finishing high school, he came to Tehran and continued his education at the University of Tehran. In 1953, he received a bachelor's degree in English Language and Literature from the Faculty of Letters and Humanities of the University of Tehran. From 1953 until 1959, he taught literature and foreign languages in Arak and Tehran high schools. He also began writing and several his poems and stories were published in magazines, he also translated Aristotle's Poetics.

In 1960, he was sent abroad by the Ministry of Culture to get acquainted with new methods of writing textbooks. After a period of study and research in this field in the Columbia University in United States, he returned to Iran and was in charge of preparing and compiling literature textbooks for high schools.

In 1962, he was appointed as Iranian Cultural Counselor in Pakistan and the management of Iranian cultural houses in the city of Lahore. Until 1965 he was engaged in cultural services and research on Islamic-Iranian culture of the subcontinent there. There he learned Sanskrit and studied the history of the Islamic period in India and Persian culture and literature.

In 1966, he went to the United States at the invitation of Professor Wilfred Cantwell Smith, a renowned Islamologist and Hinduologist and director of the Center for the Study of World Religions at Harvard University, where he researched the history of world religions and taught Persian literature and mystical texts in Persian. He also received Masters in Comparative history of Religions from Harvard University. Then he continued his studies in History of Eastern Religions and Philosophy and finally in 1971 received his PhD in this field.

During these years he traveled to India several times to study the traditional methods of interpreting Hindu texts as well as to observe the situation and religious of the Indian Zoroastrians in Varanasi, Delhi and Mumbai.

After completing his studies, he returned to Iran and began to teach in universities. For a while, he taught Persian literature at Damavand College and in philosophy group of Faculty of Letters and Humanities of the University of Tehran, he taught Eastern Philosophy. Then he was transferred to the Faculty of Theology and Islamic Studies of the University of Tehran and served in the Department of Comparative Religions and Mysticism.

In 1974, he was assigned as Iranian Cultural Counselor in India, and until the fall of 1977, he was engaged in services related to the study and research on the intellectual and cultural relations between Muslims and Hindus in the subcontinent, and published several books and articles in this field.

After completing his mission and returning to Iran, he continued to teach at the Faculty of Theology and Islamic Studies of the University of Tehran and was in charge of the management of the Department of Religions and Mysticism for several periods. He also taught history of religions, methodology and comparative mysticism there.

During his cultural services, he has published nearly 200 titles of books, articles, poems and book reviews in the form of authorship, translation and correction in Persian and English in Iran and abroad.

== Bibliography ==
=== Books ===
- Chitra and a few lyric poems from the gardener of love (original title in Persian: چترا و چند غزل از باغبان عشق), in Persian language, Translation, 1955
- New Persian poetry (original title in Persian: شعر جدید فارسی), in Persian language, Translation, 1955
- Poetic Art: Poetry (original title in Persian: هنر شاعری: بوطیقا), in Persian language, Translation, 1958
- The best poems of Robert Frost (original title in Persian: بهترین اشعار رابرت فراست), in Persian language, Translation, 1959
- The Golden Age of Iran and its philosophy and art (original title in Persian: عصر طلايی ايران و فلسفه و هنر آن), in Persian language, Translation, 1960
- Persian grammar for the first year of high school (original title in Persian: دستور زبان فارسی برای سال اول دبیرستانها), in Persian language, Cooperation, 1964
- The beautiful city of Plato and the ideal empire in ancient Iran (original title in Persian: شهر زیبای افلاطون و شاهی آرمانی در ایران باستان), in Persian language, 1973
- Al-Biruni and India (original title in Persian: بیرونی و هند), in Persian language, 1973
- A Literary history of Persia, From Firdowsi to Sadi (original title in Persian: تاريخ ادبيات ايران، از فردوسی تا سعدی), in Persian language, Translation, 1982
- Educational philosophy of Iqbal Lahori (original title in Persian: فلسفه آموزشی اقبال لاهوری), in Persian language, Introduction, 1983
- Ancient Greece (original title in Persian: یونان باستان), in Persian language, Translation, 1986
- Zoroaster, Politician or Witch-doctor? (original title in Persian: زرتشت، سیاستمدار یا جادوگر!), in Persian language, Introduction, 1986
- Parrot Letter (original title in Persian: طوطی نامه), in Persian language, Correction, 1993
- Rai and Brahman: Excerpts from Kalīla wa-Dimna (original title in Persian: رای و برهمن: گزیده کلیله و دمنه), in Persian language, Introduction, 1995
- Ferdowsi's Shahnameh with Khamsa of Nizami (original title in Persian: شاهنامه فردوسی همراه با خمسه نظامی), in Persian language, Introduction, 2000
- Excerpts from Robert Frost (original title in Persian: گزیده اشعار رابرت فراست), in Persian language & English language, Translation, 2001
- Religious Research (original title in Persian: دین‌پژوهی), in Persian language, 2002
- Encyclopedia of Iranian women: water – blood money (original title in Persian: دایره‌المعارف زن ایرانی: آب – دیه), in Persian language, Cooperation, 2004
- Encyclopedia of Iranian women: Rabia Ghazdari – Youtik (original title in Persian: دایره‌المعارف زن ایرانی: رابعه قزداری – یوتیک), in Persian language, Cooperation, 2004
- Islam: Historical and Cultural Research (original title in Persian: اسلام: پژوهشی تاریخی و فرهنگی), in Persian language, Cooperation, 2004
- Hindi syntax and Arabic syntax (original title in Persian: نحو هندی و نحو عربی), in Persian language, 2005
- Excerpts from Yoga Vasistha (original title in Persian: منتخب جوگ باسشت), in Persian language & English language, Translation, 2006
- Description of Lover's hair: Notes on The Divan of Hafez (original title in Persian: شرح شکن زلف: بر حواشی دیوان حافظ), in Persian language, 2007
- Aspects of Hindu Muslim cultural relations (original title in Persian: پیوندهای فرهنگی ایران و هند در دوره اسلامی), in Persian language & English language, 2010
- Hafez (Life and Thought) (original title in Persian: حافظ (زندگی و اندیشه)), in Persian language, Cooperation, 2013
- Great frontier letter: Tame minds (original title in Persian: مرزبان نامه بزرگ (روضه العقول)), in Persian language, Correction, 2013
- Bengal in Persian Sugar: Discourses on Cultural Relations between Iran and India (original title in Persian: بنگاله در قند پارسی: گفتارهایی در روابط فرهنگی ایران و هند), in Persian language, 2013
- World's famous articles: a collection of essays and speeches (original title in Persian: قال و مقال عالمی: مجموعه جستارها و گفتارها), in Persian language, 2017
- A letter to my child (original title in Persian: نامه ای به فرزندم), in Persian language, Introduction, 2017

=== Articles ===
- Mentioning a few points from the Great history of Jafari about the date of death of Nasir Khusraw, Ferdowsi and Khayyam (original title in Persian: ذکر چند سنه از تاریخ کبیر جعفری درباره تاریخ وفات ناصر خسرو، فردوسی، خیام), in Persian language, 1962
- Scientific works on Islamic culture outside the Islamic world (original title in Persian: کارهای علمی درباره فرهنگ اسلامی در خارج از عالم اسلام), in Persian language, 1970
- Professor Tarachand, an Islamologist who loves Iran, researches his thoughts and works (original title in Persian: استاد تاراچند، اسلام شناس ایراندوست، تحقیقی در افکار و آثار او), in Persian language, 1973
- Mysticism of Sage of Herat (original title in Persian: عرفان پیر هرات), in Persian language, 1979
- The color of the clothes of class people in Indian and Iranian society (original title in Persian: رنگ تن پوش افراد طبقات در جامعه هند و ایرانی), in Persian language, 1981
- A few more points about verses from Shahnameh (original title in Persian: چند نکته دیگر درباره ابیاتی از شاهنامه), in Persian language, 1983
- The principle of acquisition and adaptation in quoting scientific concepts (original title in Persian: اصل اخذ و اقتباس در نقل مفاهیم علمی), in Persian language, 1983
- New research on Sanai (original title in Persian: پژوهشی تازه درباره سنائی), in Persian language, 1984
- Hafez and Khusrow (original title in Persian: حافظ و خسرو), in Persian language, 1985
- Familiarity of Muslims with Aristotelian logic (original title in Persian: آشنایی مسلمانان با منطق ارسطوئی), in Persian language, 1988
- Roundtable: Dialogue of religions and understanding of cultural fields (original title in Persian: میزگرد: گفت و گوی ادیان و تفاهم حوزه های فرهنگی), in Persian language, 1992
- The Realm of the Persian Language: An Ancient Version of Ferdowsi's Shahnameh Belonging to the Center for the Great Islamic Encyclopedia (original title in Persian: قلمرو زبان فارسی: نسخه ای کهن از شاهنامه فردوسی متعلق به مرکز دایرةالمعارف بزرگ اسلامی), in Persian language, 1993
- Islamic culture and civilization (original title in Persian: فرهنگ و تمدن اسلامی), in Persian language, 1994
- Interregnum period in the history of Islamic philosophy (original title in Persian: دوره فترت در تاریخ فلسفه اسلامی), in Persian language, 1994
- Dr. Yazdgerdi, As I knew it (original title in Persian: دکتر یزدگردی. چنانچه من می شناختم), in Persian language, 1994
- The story of the meeting and correspondence of Bu Ali and Bu Saeed (original title in Persian: داستان ملاقات و مکاتبات بوعلی و بوسعید), in Persian language, 1996
- Superior and higher than the Brahmans (from the collection of "Fruit-Gathering") (original title in Persian: برتر و والاتر از بر همنان (از مجموعه «میوه چینی»)), in Persian language, 1997
- Islam; Unity and dialogue of religions (original title in Persian: اسلام؛ وحدت و گفت و گوی ادیان), in Persian language, 1998
- Cultural exchange and invasion (original title in Persian: تبادل و تهاجم فرهنگی), in Persian language, 1998
- On the corner of the roof (original title in Persian: بر گوشه بام), in Persian language, His poems, 1998
- I was her hunting (original title in Persian: صید او بودم), in Persian language, His poems, 1998
- Two poems by Dr. Fathollah Mojtabaei (original title in Persian: دو شعر از دکتر فتح الله مجتبایی), in Persian language, His poems, 1998
- In search of another horizon (original title in Persian: در جستجوی آفاقی دیگر), in Persian language, 2001
- Roundtable: Mysticism and Globalization (original title in Persian: میزگرد: عرفان و جهانی شدن), in Persian language, 2001
- Suhrawardi and the culture of ancient Iran (original title in Persian: سهروردی و فرهنگ ایران باستان), in Persian language, 2001
- Suhrawardi and the ancient Iran (original title in Persian: سهروردی و ایران باستان), in Persian language, 2002
- Blind men and an elephant why was it dark in the house? (original title in Persian: پیل چرا در خانه تاریک بود؟), in Persian language, 2002
- Iranology and Manuscripts (original title in Persian: ایرانشناسی و نسخه های خطی), in Persian language, 2002
- Indian religions (original title in Persian: اديان هند), in Persian language, 2003
- Elements of Tolerance in Indian Rituals (original title in Persian: عناصر مدارا در آیینهای هندی), in Persian language, 2004
- Iranian context of the Judeo-Christian concept of "MYSTERION" (original title in Persian: زمینه ایرانی مفهوم یهودی – مسیحی ""راز""), in Persian language, 2004
- Descent and thought of Tagore (original title in Persian: تبار و اندیشه تاگور), in Persian language, 2005
- Tagore and his poems: Ten lyric poems from the book Gardener of Love (original title in Persian: تاگور و سروده هایش: ده غزل از کتاب باغبان عشق), in Persian language, 2005
- Mani and Shapur, a historical experience of eclectic pluralism (original title in Persian: مانی و شاپور تجربه ای تاریخی از پلورالیزم التقاطی), in Persian language, 2006
- India and Iranian identity (original title in Persian: هند و هویت ایرانی), in Persian language, 2006
- Hafez in Goethe's Faust (original title in Persian: حافظ در فاوست گوته), in Persian language, 2008
- Religious policy of Islamic governments in the Indian subcontinent (from the beginning to the establishment of the Babrian state) (original title in Persian: سیاست دینی حکومت های اسلامی در شبه قاره هند (از آغاز تا تاسیس حکومت بابریان)), in Persian language, 2008
- A Look at the History of Shaivism in Hinduism: Its Origins, Evolution and Schools (original title in Persian: نگاهي به تاريخچه شيواپرستي در دين هندويي: خاستگاه، تحول و مکاتب آن), in Persian language, 2008
- Azari Tusi (original title in Persian: آذری طوسی), in Persian language, 2009
- Dialogue: Aspects of Religious Historiography (original title in Persian: گفت و گو: سویه های تاریخ نگاری دینی), in Persian language, 2009
- The letters (original title in Persian: نامه ها), in Persian language, 2010
- The suffix "-tar" in Astar and Kabutar (original title in Persian: پسوند «ـ تر» در استر و کبوتر), in Persian language, 2010
- A few points about Marzbannameh: the author and its main language (original title in Persian: چند نکته درباره مرزبان نامه: مصنف و زبان اصلی آن), in Persian language, 2011
- Asadi son and Asadi father: Ali ibn Ahmad and Ahmad ibn Mansour (original title in Persian: اسدیِ پسر و اسدیِ پدر: علی بن احمد و احمد بن منصور), in Persian language, 2011
- Corner or treasure? (original title in Persian: کُنج یا گَنج؟), in Persian language, 2011
- Most translations today are copyright infringement (original title in Persian: غالب ترجمه های امروز تجاوز به حقوق نویسنده است), in Persian language, 2012
- Iran and India, a millennial bond (original title in Persian: ایران و هند، پیوندی هزاران ساله), in Persian language, 2013
- A few more points about corner or treasure (original title in Persian: چند نکته دیگر درباره کُنج یا گَنج), in Persian language, 2013
- Tagore and New Bhakti Mysticism (original title in Persian: تاگور و عرفان بهکتی نو), in Persian language, 2013
- Memoirs of the poet Khanlari, publisher of Sokhan magazine (original title in Persian: خاطراتی از خانلری شاعر، ناشر مجله سخن), in Persian language, 2013
- Iqbal Lahori, a former religious intellectual (original title in Persian: اقبال لاهوری، روشنفکر دینی پیشین), in Persian language, 2014
- My acquaintance with Dr. Khanlari (original title in Persian: آشنایی من با دکتر خانلری), in Persian language, 2014
- Rajatarangini and the Background of Historiography in India (original title in Persian: راج ترنگینی و پیشینه تاریخ نگاری در هند), in Persian language & English language, 2015
- Another look at the death date of Nasir Khusraw (original title in Persian: نگاهی دیگر به تاریخ وفات ناصر خسرو), in Persian language, 2015
- Founder of correct and accurate publishing in Iran (original title in Persian: پایه گذار نشر صحیح و دقیق در ایران), in Persian language, 2016
- What is the secret of Hafez's permanence? (original title in Persian: راز ماندگاری حافظ در چیست؟), in Persian language, 2016
- A Greek word in Vendidad: from Eskhar and Eskar to Askar and Lashkar (original title in Persian: یک واژه یونانی در وندیداد: از اسخر و اسکر تا عسکر و لشکر), in Persian language, 2016
- Thanks to Mr. Samii (original title in Persian: سپاسگزاری از جناب استاد سمیعی), in Persian language, 2016
- Praised man in memory of Dr. Manouchehr Sotoudeh (original title in Persian: مرد ستوده به یاد دکتر منوچهر ستوده), in Persian language, 2016
- Mettle and education from the point of view of Saadi and Confucius (original title in Persian: طینت و تربیت از دیدگاه سعدی و کنفسیوس), in Persian language, 2016
- A brief look at the cultural relations between Iran and Greece during the Achaemenid period (original title in Persian: نگاهی گذرا به روابط فرهنگی ایران و یونان در دوران هخامنشیان), in Persian language, 2016
- Indo-Buddhist stories in Persian literature (original title in Persian: داستانهای هندی – بودایی در ادبیات فارسی), in Persian language, 2016
- Praised peoples by Daqiqi and another look at the date of his death (original title in Persian: ممدوحان دقیقی و نگاهی دیگر به تاریخ وفات او), in Persian language, 2018
- Maimonides and the method of confronting the simile verses of the Old Testament (original title in Persian: ابن میمون و روش مواجهه با آیات تشبیهی کتاب مقدس), in Persian language, 2018
- Another look at a few verses of Hafez's sonnets (original title in Persian: نگاهی دیگر به چند بیت از غزل های حافظ), in Persian language, 2018
- Eastern and Iranian view of India (original title in Persian: دید شرقی و ایرانی به هند), in Persian language, 2020

== Honours ==
Dr. Fathollah Mojtabaei has received awards in various fields. Including:

- Celebrating his scientific and cultural services in Society for the National Heritage of Iran, 2000
- Iranian Science and Culture Hall of Fame as Ever-lasting Names / People in the field of religious history, 2002
- First Order of Culture and Art, 2003
- Iran's Book of the Year Awards for the book "Hindi syntax and Arabic syntax, Persian: نحو هندی و نحو عربی", 2006
- Farabi International Award as "Veteran of Iranian Humanities", 2008
- First Order of Persian Politeness, 2011
- Founder of Comparative Studies in Religions and Mysticism in Iran, 2018 and 2019

== Dr. Fathollah Mojtabaei Award ==
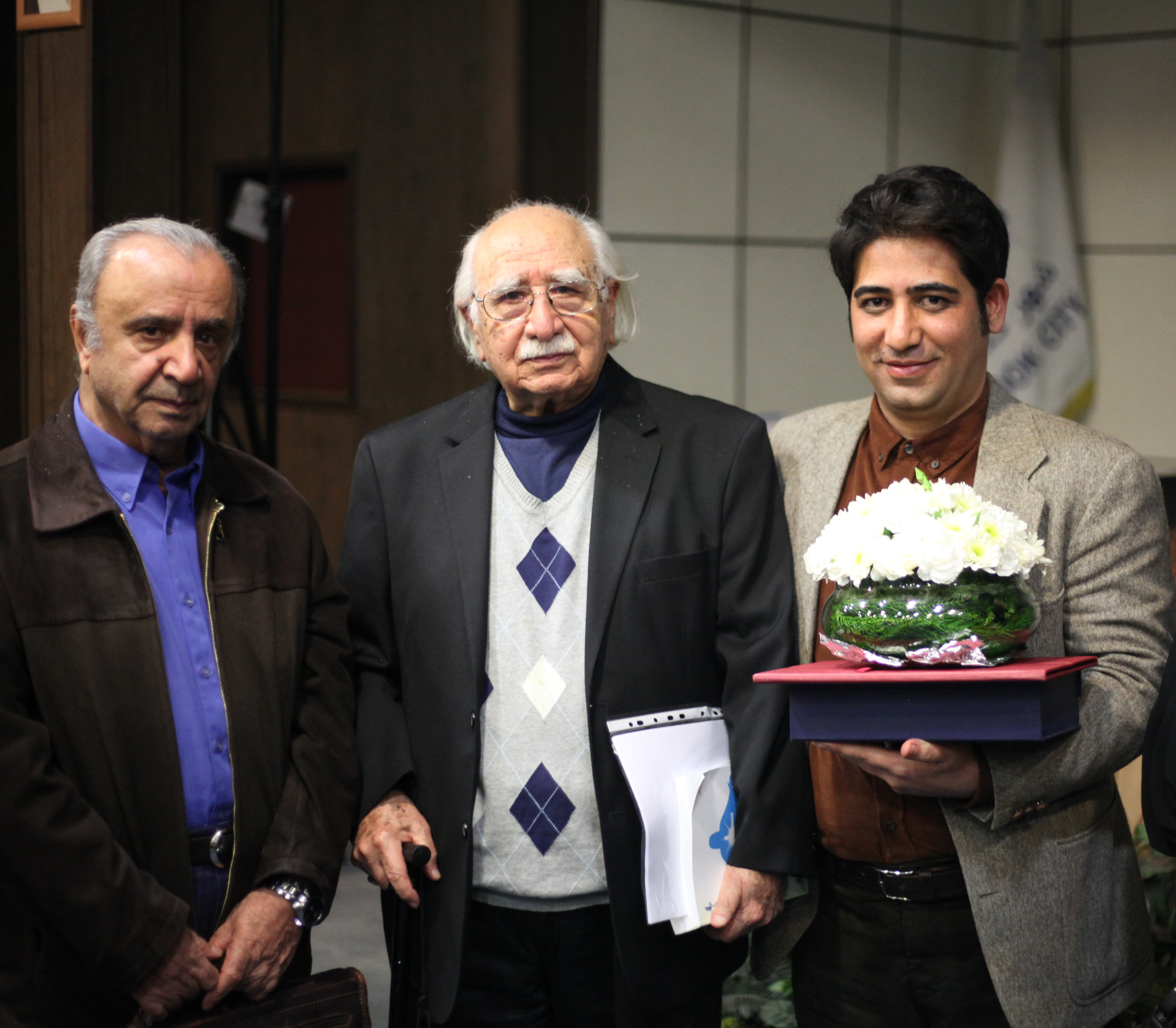
Fathollah Mojtabaei at the ninth Dr. Mojtabaei Award ceremony (January 2020)

Dr. Fathollah Mojtabaei Award is an award given to the best doctoral dissertation in the fields of Persian language and literature, religions and mysticism. The first ceremony of the award was held in December 2011 and nine of them have been held so far in Iran.

== Documentary film ==
A documentary film about the life and scientific and cultural works of Dr. Fathollah Mojtabaei has been produced under the name of "How good it was that you were born (original title in Persian: چه خوب شد که بدنیا آمدید)", which has been broadcast in July 2019 via IRIB TV4 channel.

== See also ==
- Alireza Feyz
- Mahdi Ahouie
- Mehrdad Avesta
- Mohammad Taqi Danesh Pajouh
- Ali Osat Hashemi
- Ali Akbar Sadeghi
