= Alireza Feyz =

Iranian Researcher, jurist and university professor (1925–2019)

- Born: 1925; Qom, Iran
- Died: March 3, 2019 (aged 93); Tehran, Iran
- Education: Faculty of Theology and Islamic Studies of the University of Tehran (Ph.D.)
- Occupations: Researcher of Islamic jurisprudence, principles and philosophy; University professor; Author
- Employer: University of Tehran
- Father: Mirza Mohammad Feyz

Alireza Feyz (1925 – March 3, 2019) was an Iranian author, researcher of Islamic jurisprudence and Islamic philosophy, professor at the University of Tehran and jurist.

== Birth ==
Alireza Feyz, son of Ayatollah Mirza Mohammad Feyz and descendant of Mohsen Fayz Kashani, was born on 1925 in Qom, Iran.

== Education ==
From the age of five to seven, Alireza Feyz went to a local Maktabkhaneh in Qom to learn primary concept of Islamic studies. Then he studied in Mohammadieh Elementary and High School in Qom and got his diploma there. In addition to studying in high school, he studied in the Qom Seminary and gained knowledge from several professors. From 1938 to 1953 he studied advanced concepts of Islamic jurisprudence and principles for 15 years in Qom Seminary and Hawza Najaf. He also studied Islamic philosophy with master Muhammad Husayn Tabatabai. In 1950, with the permission of eminent scholars such as Ayatollah Seyyed Mohammad Mohaqeq Damad and Ayatollah Seyyed Mohammad Taghi Khansari, he reached the level of ijtihad. In the meantime, he taught at some levels of Arabic literature, logic, Islamic jurisprudence, and Principles of Islamic jurisprudence in addition to his studies. In the late 1950s he came to Tehran and entered University of Tehran to study Islamic philosophy there. In 1953, he completed his bachelor's degree in Islamic philosophy and began teaching again in the Qom Seminary. With the opening of the doctoral course in Faculty of Theology and Islamic Studies of the University of Tehran, he was one of the first students of this course in the field of philosophy. He continued his education in this field until doctorate degree. Then he wrote his doctoral dissertation entitled "Critique of Aristotle's logic" and obtained his PhD in Islamic philosophy from Faculty of Theology and Islamic Studies of the University of Tehran in 1963.

== Career ==
From 1957, when he was a PhD course student, he taught Principles of Islamic jurisprudence and Islamic jurisprudence at the Faculty of Theology and Islamic Studies in University of Tehran, and finally reached the rank of full professor. For almost 20 years, he was the director of the Department of Jurisprudence and Fundamentals of Islamic Law in University of Tehran. He continued his scientific activity with universities for about 35 years. In 1981, he was praised by Ali Khamenei then President of Iran as an exemplary professor, and in 1991, as a distinguished professor at the University of Tehran, he received a plaque of honor from Akbar Hashemi Rafsanjani then President of Iran. In 2003 he was selected as a permanent figure at Iranian Science and Culture Hall of Fame in the field of Islamic jurisprudence and law.

During Iranian Cultural Revolution, he was sent to the officer's college and was in charge of teaching Islamic criminal jurisprudence, reviewing books and textbooks in that college.

With the start of the Dehkhoda Dictionary project, he collaborated for 12 years in preparing 14 volumes of the dictionaries.

These are some of his other activities: member of Academy of Sciences of Iran, member of The Organization for Researching and Composing University textbooks in the Humanities, member of The World Forum for Proximity of Islamic Schools of Thought, collaboration with University of Islamic Denominations, Representative of the Faculty of Theology and Islamic Studies in the Committee for the Promotion of Professors of the University of Tehran, collaboration with Tehran School of Law and Political Science, collaboration with Tarbiat Modares University, collaboration with University of Judicial Sciences and Administrative Services, collaboration with Islamic Azad University.

He retired from the University of Tehran in 2001.

== Bibliography ==
=== Books ===
- Basis of jurisprudence and principles (title in Persian: مبادی فقه و اصول), in Persian language, 1984
- Islamic General Criminal Law (title in Persian: حقوق جزای عمومی اسلام), in Persian language, 1984
- Comparison and Application in Islamic Public Criminal Law (title in Persian: مقارنه و تطبیق در حقوق جزای عمومی اسلام), in Persian language, 1985
- Application in the general criminal law of Islam (title in Persian: تطبیق در حقوق جزای عمومی اسلام), in Persian language, 1986
- Translation of Lam'eh book (title in Persian: ترجمه کتاب لمعه), in Persian language, Translation, 1987
- Basis of jurisprudence and principles include some of the issues of those two sciences (title in Persian: مبادی فقه و اصول مشتمل بر بخشی از مسائل آن دو علم), in Persian language, 1990
- The Wergild (title in Persian: دیه), in Persian language, Translation, 1993
- A discussion about obstruction (title in Persian: بحثی درباره انسداد), in Persian language, 1994
- Ethics lessons (title in Persian: درسهای اخلاق), in Persian language, Translation, 1997
- Characteristics of ijtihad and dynamic jurisprudence (title in Persian: ویژگیهای اجتهاد و فقه پویا), in Persian language, 2003
- Jurisprudential opinions of Mullah Mohsen Feyz Kashani (title in Persian: آرای فقهی ملامحسن فیض کاشانی), in Persian language, 2008
- Legal Thoughts of Custom and Ijtihad (title in Persian: اندیشه‌های حقوقی عرف و اجتهاد), in Persian language, 2009
- Exclusive (private) criminal law of Islam (title in Persian: حقوق جزای اختصاصی (خصوصی) اسلام), in Persian language
- A critical commentary on the law of retribution, corrections, reprimand and wergilds (title in Persian: شرحی انتقادی بر قانون حدود، تعزیرات، قصاص و دیات), in Persian language
- Dictionary of Terms of Principles of Jurisprudence (title in Persian: فرهنگ اصطلاحات اصول فقه), in Persian language
- Critique of Aristotle's logic (title in Persian: انتقاد بر منطق ارسطو), in Persian language
- Ijtihad and Taqlid (title in Persian: اجتهاد و تقلید), in Persian language
- Role of custom and manners in ijtihad (title in Persian: نقش عرف و سیره عقلا در اجتهاد), in Persian language
- Components and consensus and community of command and prohibition (title in Persian: اجزا و اجماع و اجتماع امر و نهی), in Persian language
- The unity is the reason of Shiite wisdom and the interests of the Sunni messengers (title in Persian: وحدت دليل عقل شيعه و مصالح مرسله اهل سنت), in Persian language

=== Articles ===
- Every year when the month of Muharram arrives (title in Persian: همه ساله ماه محرم که فرا می رسد), in Persian language, 1947
- The only important philosophy of Zakat and Khums (title in Persian: یگانه فلسفه شایان اهمیت زکوة و خمس), in Persian language, 1947
- Around human (title in Persian: در پیرامون انسان), in Persian language, 1948
- Battle in the shadow of religion and knowledge in the community scene (title in Persian: نبرد در سایه دین و دانش در صحنه اجتماع), in Persian language, 1949
- Mullah Mohsen Feyz Kashani and some fatwas from him (title in Persian: ملامحسن فیض کاشانی و چند فتوی از او), in Persian language, 1970
- Genesis of logic (title in Persian: پیدایش منطق), in Persian language, 1971
- Research method in Islamic jurisprudence (title in Persian: روش تحقیق در فقه اسلامی), in Persian language, 1972
- Research Method in Islamic Jurisprudence "A Discussion in Evidence" (title in Persian: روش تحقیق در فقه اسلامی «بحثی در ادله»), in Persian language, 1975
- Contemporary jurisprudence seeks solutions and attempts to resolve jurisprudential differences (title in Persian: فقه مقارن چاره جویی و تلاش برای رفع اختلافات فقهی), in Persian language, 1979
- Criticize and check of Book (title in Persian: نقد و بررسی کتاب), in Persian language, 1985
- Ijtihad and its history (title in Persian: اجتهاد و تاریخ آن), in Persian language, 1986
- The value of rational evidence is the reason for wisdom (title in Persian: ارزش مدرکات عقلی دلیل عقل), in Persian language, 1988
- Characteristics of the jurisprudence of Mullah Mohsen Feyz (title in Persian: ویژگیهای فقه ملامحسن فیض), in Persian language, 1988
- The role of time and place in jurisprudence and ijtihad (title in Persian: نقش زمان و مکان در فقه، و اجتهاد), in Persian language, 1992
- Lasting Monuments: Waqf and its Motives (title in Persian: یادگارهای ماندگار: وقف و انگیزه های آن), in Persian language, 1994
- Transformation of the judicial system; Nodes and Solutions (title in Persian: تحول نظام قضایی؛ گره ها و راه حل ها), in Persian language, 1994
- The expediency of the endowment and some of its conditions (title in Persian: مصلحت وقف و پاره ای از شرطهای آن), in Persian language, 1995
- Application of jurisprudential sources (title in Persian: کاربرد مآخذ فقهی), in Persian language, 1995
- The path of ijtihad and jurisprudence (title in Persian: راهی که اجتهاد و فقه در پیش دارند), in Persian language, 1995
- Order and disorder in traditional societies, and academia (title in Persian: نظم و بی نظمی در جوامع سنتی، و دانشگاهی), in Persian language, 1996
- A study of jurisprudential issues regarding the role of reason, ethics, time and place (title in Persian: بررسى مباحث فقهى پیرامون نقش عقل، اخلاق، زمان و مکان), in Persian language, 2001
- Extent of jurisprudence and expression of its examples (title in Persian: گستردگی فقه و بیان مصادیق آن), in Persian language, 2002
- Council Ijtihad Roundtable (title in Persian: میزگرد اجتهاد شورایی), in Persian language, 2003
- Customary associations (title in Persian: ارتکازات عرفی), in Persian language, 2005
- Custom of the wise (title in Persian: عرف عقلا), in Persian language, 2006
- Description of the life and works of Feyz Kashani (title in Persian: شرح احوال و آثار فیض کاشانی), in Persian language, 2007
- Field of Worship Jurisprudence: The Place of Khums in Islamic Economics (title in Persian: حوزه فقه عبادت: جایگاه خمس در اقتصاد اسلامی), in Persian language, 2008
- Investigating the dynamics factors of jurisprudence (title in Persian: بررسی عوامل پویایی فقه), in Persian language, 2008
- Investigating the authority of fatwa reputation in the principles of affiliates with an approach to the views of Ayatollah Boroujerdi, Khoei and Imam Khomeini (title in Persian: بررسی حجیت شهرت فتوایی در اصول متلقات با رویکردی بر دیدگاه، آیت الله بروجردی، خویی و امام خمینی), in Persian language, 2008
- Validity and invalidity of seeing the crescent with the armed eye (title in Persian: اعتبار و عدم اعتبار رؤیت هلال با چشم مسلح), in Persian language, 2009
- Comparison of remittance contract with conversion of obligation and transfer of debt and demand (title in Persian: مقایسه عقد حواله با تبدیل تعهد و انتقال دین و طلب), in Persian language, 2009
- Relationship between deterrent punishments and punishments in Iranian criminal law (title in Persian: نسبت مجازات های بازدارنده با تعزیرات در حقوق کیفری ایران), in Persian language, 2010

== Death ==
Alireza Feyz died on March 3, 2019, at age of 93 in Tehran, Iran. Two days later, the funeral was held for him at the Faculty of Theology and Islamic Studies of the University of Tehran.

== See also ==
- Mohammad Mofatteh
- Mohammad Beheshti
- Mohammad-Javad Bahonar
- Hossein Elahi Ghomshei
- Mehrdad Avesta
- Mohammad Hosseini
- Hamid Aboutalebi
- Mahmoud Khatami
- Mohammad Taqi Danesh Pajouh
- Jalal Jalalizadeh
- Abbas Zaryab
- Hassan Ameli
- Iraj Afshar
- Mahdi Ahouie
- Mehrdad Avesta
- Mohammad Taqi Danesh Pajouh
- Ali Osat Hashemi
- Ali Akbar Sadeghi
