= Mohammad Mohammadi-Malayeri =

Iranian historian and literary scholar (1911–2002)

- محمد محمدی ملایری
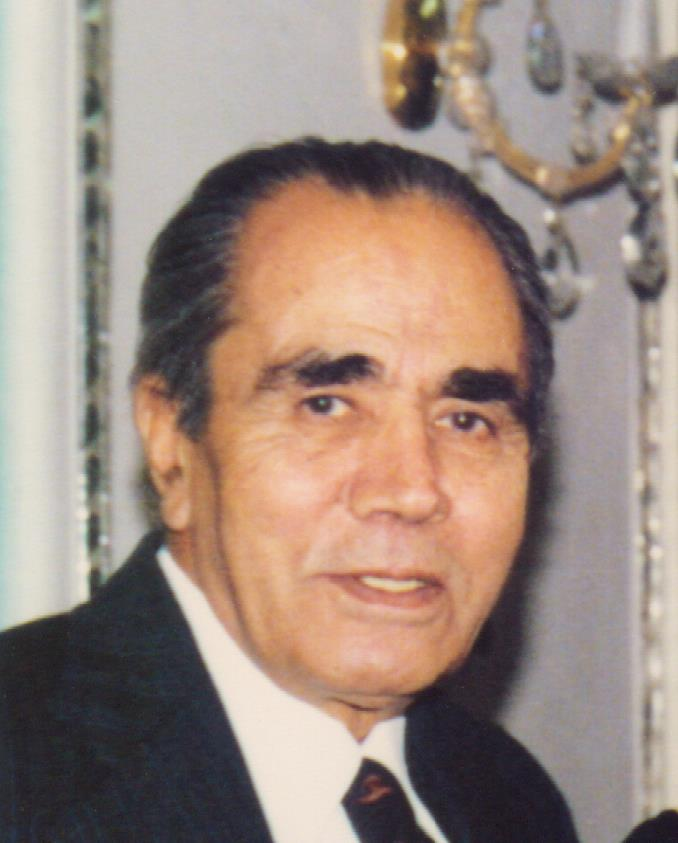
- Born: 1911; Malayer, Iran
- Died: June 22, 2002 (aged 91); Tehran, Iran
- Occupations: Professor of Comparative Persian-Arabic History and Culture

Mohammad Mohammadi-Malayeri (Persian: محمد محمدی ملایری; 1911–2002) was an Iranian historian, linguist, and literary scholar. He authored numerous books and articles on comparative Persian and Arabic languages and literature as well as Iranian history specifically the period of transition between the Sassanid Empire and the Islamic era. He taught at the American University of Beirut, the Lebanese University, as well as the University of Tehran, where he was the Dean of the Faculty of Theological Sciences. He is best known for his 5-volume work titled “Iranian Culture and History during the Period of Transition between the Sassanid and Islamic Eras”.

== Early life and education ==
Mohammad Mohammadi-Malayeri was born to Hedayatollah Najafi in 1911 in Malayer in western Iran. His father was the regional Marja' Taghlid and Hakem Shar' (religious leader and shari'a judge). In 1934 he enrolled in the Faculty of Theological Sciences at the newly established University of Tehran, majoring in Arabic literature. Ranked first in his class he received a bachelor's degree in 1937. Following an agreement with the American University of Beirut (AUB) to establish Persian Language Studies there, he was sent by the Ministry of Education and Culture to Beirut to teach Persian Language and Literature and to continue his studies in Arabic Literature. He obtained his Doctorate from AUB in 1942.

== Career ==
Upon return to Tehran he was initially asked by the Ministry of Education and Culture to prepare a plan to improve the teaching of Arabic in Iranian schools and the training of Arabic teachers. He then joined the Faculty of Theological Sciences, and continued this activity to modernize Arabic studies at the university level, which resulted in authoring a book titled ‘Dars al Loghah wal Adab’ in two volumes published by Tehran University in 1949 and 1951. The book continues to be taught in Iranian universities. He was Vice Dean of the Faculty from 1950 to 1957, when he was again sent to Beirut to establish the Department of Persian Language and Literature at the newly established Lebanese University. He chaired the Department for the next 10 years. While at Lebanese University he established a bilingual Persian/Arabic journal titled Al Derasat al Adabiyah (Literary Studies) which is still being published. During this period he also authored three books in Arabic: Persian Roots in Arabic Literature – Books of Taj and Ayeen, Translation and Transcription from Persian in the First Centuries of Islam, and Persian Literature – Its most Important Periods and Most Renowned Elements. Meanwhile, he also served as the Iranian Cultural Counsellor in Lebanon. He returned to Tehran in 1968 when he was appointed as the Dean of the Faculty of Theological Sciences of the University of Tehran, where he established the literary publication ‘Maghalaat va Barresiha’. He retired from academia in 1979.

== Later life ==
During retirement he organized more than forty years of research into the 5-volume book “Iranian Culture and History during the Period of Transition between the Sassanid and Islamic Eras”. This book was selected as Iran’s book of the Year in 2003.

== Personal life ==
He married Pari Mosavvar-Rahmani in 1942. They had three children: Nasrin (1944–1999), Shahrokh (born 1948), and Sousan (born 1949). Professor Mohammadi died at home in Tehran in 2002 at the age of 91.

== Contributions ==
Prof. Mohammadi’s focus in his lifetime studies was to explain the apparent 250-year break in Iranian literary history between the collapse of the Sassanid Empire in the seventh century AD and the reappearance of Persian poetry in the eleventh century AD. He refuted the general belief in such a break and argued that during the period of transition between the Sassanid and Islamic eras Iranian civilization and culture infiltrated and impacted Arab and Islamic life through the efforts of Iranian scholars and administrators who chose to produce their works in the language of the Quran, i.e. Arabic. He went on to describe why this period of transition and the Persian roots of Islamic civilization have so far been obscured. He identified the main reason as ta’arib (or Arabization), i.e. giving Persian names an Arabic format so that the roots of the original names are forgotten, or covering in history books only events and tales pertaining to Arab migrants and ignoring the coverage of the lives of non-Arab peoples within the territories of Iran, or avoiding references to Persian and Iranian sources in Arabic books of history, which collectively resulted in the gradual obscurity of the manifestations of Iranian civilization in reference books of the period of transition.

== See also ==
- Mohammad Mofatteh
- Mohammad Beheshti
- Mohammad-Javad Bahonar
- Alireza Feyz
- Hossein Elahi Ghomshei
- Mehrdad Avesta
- Mohammad Hosseini
- Hamid Aboutalebi
- Mahmoud Khatami
- Mohammad Taqi Danesh Pajouh
- Jalal Jalalizadeh
- Abbas Zaryab
- Hassan Ameli
