= Mihr (magazine) =

Persian language magazine, 1933 to 1968

- Editor: Majid Movaqqar and Iraj Afshar
- Categories: Literature, science
- Frequency: Monthly
- Founded: 1933
- Final issue: 1968
- Country: Iran
- Based in: Tehran
- Language: Persian
- Website: Mihr

Mihr (Persian: مهر, lit. 'The Sun') was a Persian-language science and literary monthly magazine published between 1933/34 and 1967/68 in a total of 30 issues. The editor was Majid Movaqqar, and since 1953 the bibliographer, historian, and scholar of Persian studies Iraj Afshar became his successor. Afshars father, the scholar Mahmoud Afshar, founded the journal Āyandeh, that paid special attention to Persian language.
