= Badr al-Zaman Gharib =

Iranian linguist (1929-2020 )

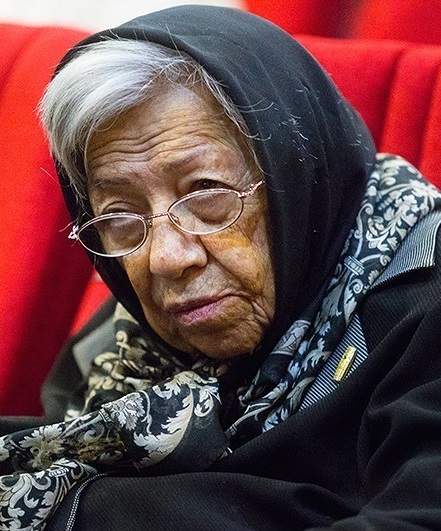
- Gharib in 2017
- Born: August 23, 1929; Tehran, Iran
- Died: July 28, 2020 (aged 90)
- Resting place: Gharib family tomb in the Shah Abdol-Azim Shrine
- Education: University of California, Berkeley
- Occupation: Linguist
- Writing career
- Period: 1986–2016
- Notable work: Analysis of verb structure in Sogdian language
- Notable awards: Iran's Book of the Year Awards; Iranian Science and Culture Hall of Fame (1998)

Badr al-Zaman Gharib Garakani (Persian: بدرالزمان قریب, romanized: Badr al-Zamān Qarīb; August 23, 1929 – July 28, 2020) was an Iranian linguist. She was the only permanent female member of the Academy of Persian Language and Literature, a lasting figure and advisor to the head of this academy.

== Family ==
Badr al-Zaman Gharib Garakani was born on the first of July 28, 1929 in Tehran. Her family was originally from Garakan, Ashtian, Markazi province, and she was a descendant of Shams al-Ulama Gharib Gerkani.

== Education ==
Gharib completed her primary and secondary education in the same city with a diploma in natural sciences. After that, she stopped studying in that natural field. Until an opportunity came and she became interested in Persian literature. In 1954, she was accepted in the entrance exam of the Faculty of Letters and Humanities of the University of Tehran. Gharib received a bachelor's degree in Persian language and literature in 1957, and a year later she went to the United States of America with a scholarship from the University of Pennsylvania to study the ancient languages of Iran. She received his master's degree from the Department of Linguistics and Oriental Studies at the University of Pennsylvania and spent a year studying phonetics at the University of Michigan. In this course, in addition to Sanskrit, she also learned Indo-European studies. In 1961 she entered the University of California, Berkeley using the scholarship of the first students and did research under the supervision of Walter Bruno Henning. She wrote her doctoral thesis entitled Structural analysis of the verb in Sogdian language.

== University professor ==
After returning to Iran for a year, Gharib taught ancient Persian language, Middle Persian and Persian language history at Shiraz University for four and a half years with the rank of assistant professor. After that, she went to the United States once again with the opportunity to study and at the same time as research, she taught Persian language as a visiting professor at the University of Utah and also spent a semester as a researcher at Harvard University. She returned to Shiraz University again. Gharib was transferred to Tehran University in 1971.

== Academy of Persian Language and Literature ==
Gharib was elected as a permanent member of the Persian Language and Literature Academy in 1998 and in 1999 she was elected to the position of head of the dialectology department of this academy. In 2012, she also was the only continuous female member of the Persian Language and Literature Academy. Gharib was a member of the Center for the Great Islamic Encyclopedia for more than two decades.

== Awards and honors ==
Gharib was the winner of the award of the Iranian Science and Culture Hall of Fame (1998). Two books of Gharib's works, "Silent Languages" (1986) and Sogdi Language Culture (1995) have been selected by the Ministry of Culture and Islamic Guidance as Iran's Book of the Year Awards. In December 2012, the 17th historical silk carpet award of the Mahmoud Afshar Endowment Foundation was awarded to Badrulzaman Gharib. The book "Celebration of Badr al-Zaman Gharib" written by Zahra Zarshanas and Vida Nadaf with articles by Jale Amoozgar, Abulqasem Ismailpour, Iraj Afshar and Manouchehr Sotoudeh was published by Tahori Publications in order to commemorate these works.

== Death ==
Gharib died in the early morning of July 28, 2020 at the age of 90. She died due to acute respiratory syndrome coronavirus-2 (SARS-CoV-2).

== Books ==
- Analysis of verb structure in Sogdian language (English)
- Silent Languages - written by Yohannes Friedrich - translated by Yadullah Samrah and Badr al-Zaman Gharib (book of the year of the Islamic Republic of Iran in 1366)
- The story of Buddha's birth
- Sogdian culture (Sogdian-Persian-English)
- Discovery of the Pahlavi inscription in China
- Vesentra Jatke, the story of the Buddha's birth based on the Sogdian tradition
- History of dialectology in Iran
- Sogdianology (collection of articles)
- Researches of ancient and middle Iran
- Qatuf al-Rabi (principles of jurisprudence in Arabic poetry)
