= Victor El-Kik =

Lebanese Iranologist

Victor El-Kik فيكتور الكك
- Born: 1936
- Died: 2017 (aged 80–81)
- Scientific career
- Fields: Islamic Studies, Iranology

Victor El-Kik (1936-2017) was a Lebanese Persian scholar. He is known for his works on Iran and Islam. He is a winner of Farabi International Award.

== Works ==
- Arab culture v/s the future
- Badīʿāt al-zamān baḥṯ tārīẖī taḥlīlī fī Maqāmāt al-Hamaḏānī
- Beirut crossroads of civilisations
- Dictionnaire historique de l'Islam
- Fī qawāʿid al-luġaẗ al-ʿarabiyyaẗ
- Ghazālī, Ḥujjat al-Islām
- ǧḏwr alʿrbyẗ frwʿ alḥyaẗ
- Ibn al-Muqaffaʻ adīb al-ʻaql
- lonely woman
- Ṣināʿat͏̈ al-kitābat͏̈
