= Avesta (disambiguation) =

The Avesta is the primary collection of sacred texts of Zoroastrianism.

Avesta may also refer to:

== Places ==
- Avesta Municipality (Avesta kommun), one of 290 municipalities of Sweden
- Avesta (locality), a locality of the above municipality in the traditional province of Dalarna, Sweden
  - Avesta AIK, a sports club in Avesta, Sweden

== People ==
- Mehrdad Avesta (1930–1991), Iranian poet
