= Ayandeh =

Ayandeh (in Persian: آینده, meaning 'the future') may refer to:

- Ayandeh Bank, Iranian bank
- Ayandeh (magazine), Persian journal of Iranian studies founded in 1925 by Dr. Mahmood Afshar
- Ayandeh (polling organisation), opinion poll organisation in Iran that was closed down in 2002
