= Francis Richard =

French orientalist

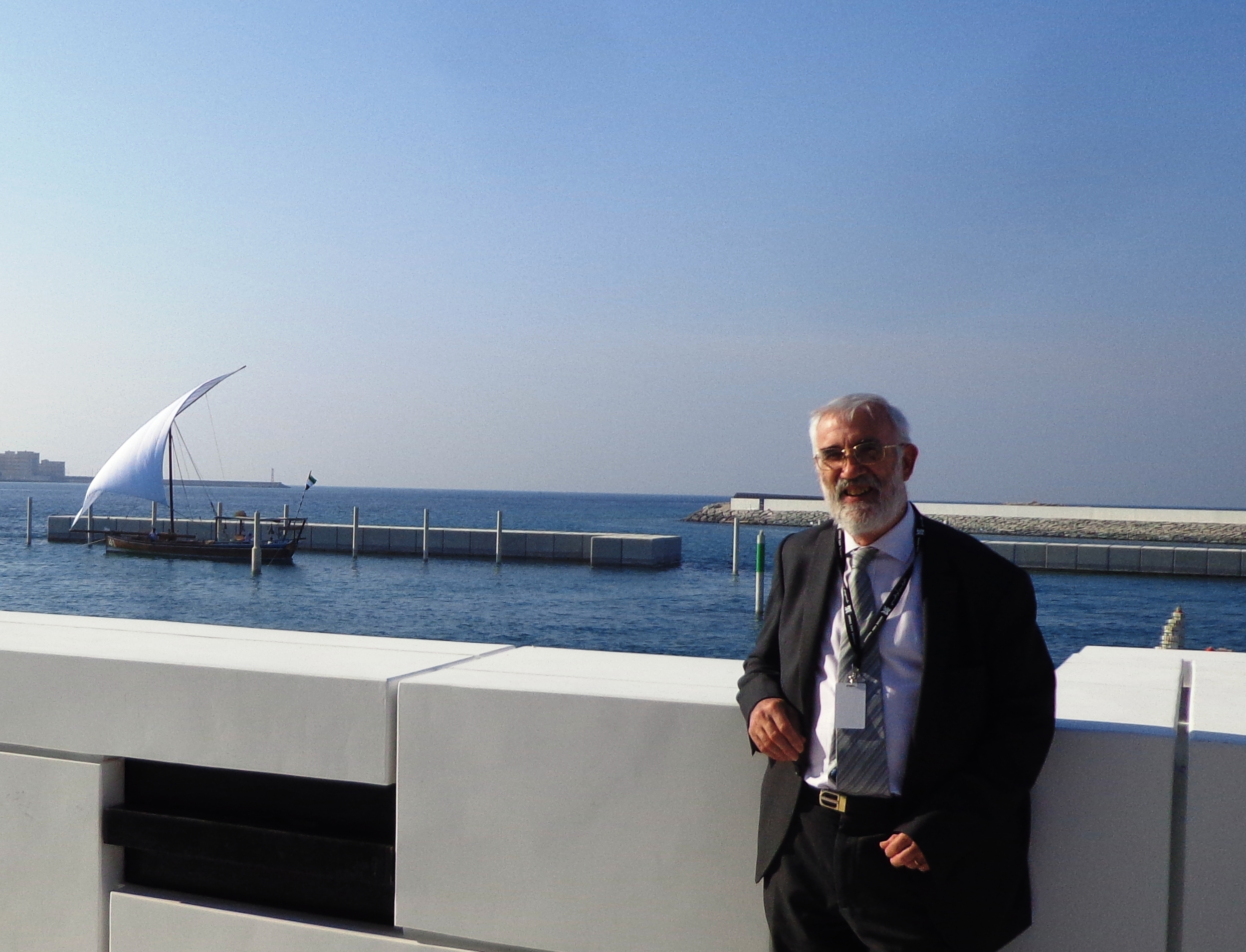
- Francis Richard in Abu Dhabi 2017
- Born: 1948 (age 77–78)
- Known for: Research on Persian manuscripts
- Scientific career
- Institutions: Bibliothèque Nationale de France

Francis Richard (born 1948) is a French orientalist. He is known for his research on Persian manuscripts in the Oriental collection of the Bibliothèque Nationale de France. He is a winner of Farabi International Award.
