= Mohammad Mohammadi =

Mohammad Mohammadi may refer to:

- Mohammad Mohammadi (footballer) (born 1977), Iranian football goalkeeper
- Mohammad Mohammadi Gilani (1928–2014), Shiite cleric from Iran
- Mohammad Mohammadi-Malayeri (1911–2002), Iranian historian, linguist, and literary scholar
- Mohammad Reyshahri (1946–2022), also known as Mohammad Mohammadi-Nik, Iranian politician and cleric
- Mohammad Mohammadi (judoka) (born 1991), Iranian judoka
