= Hamid Ahmadi =

Hamid Ahmadi can refer to:

- Hamid Ahmadi (historian) (b. 1945), Iranian historian
- Hamid Ahmadi (futsal) (b. 1988), Iranian futsal player
