= College of Science, University of Tehran =

College of the University of Tehran

College of Science or Science Campus
- دانشکدگان علوم، دانشگاه تهران
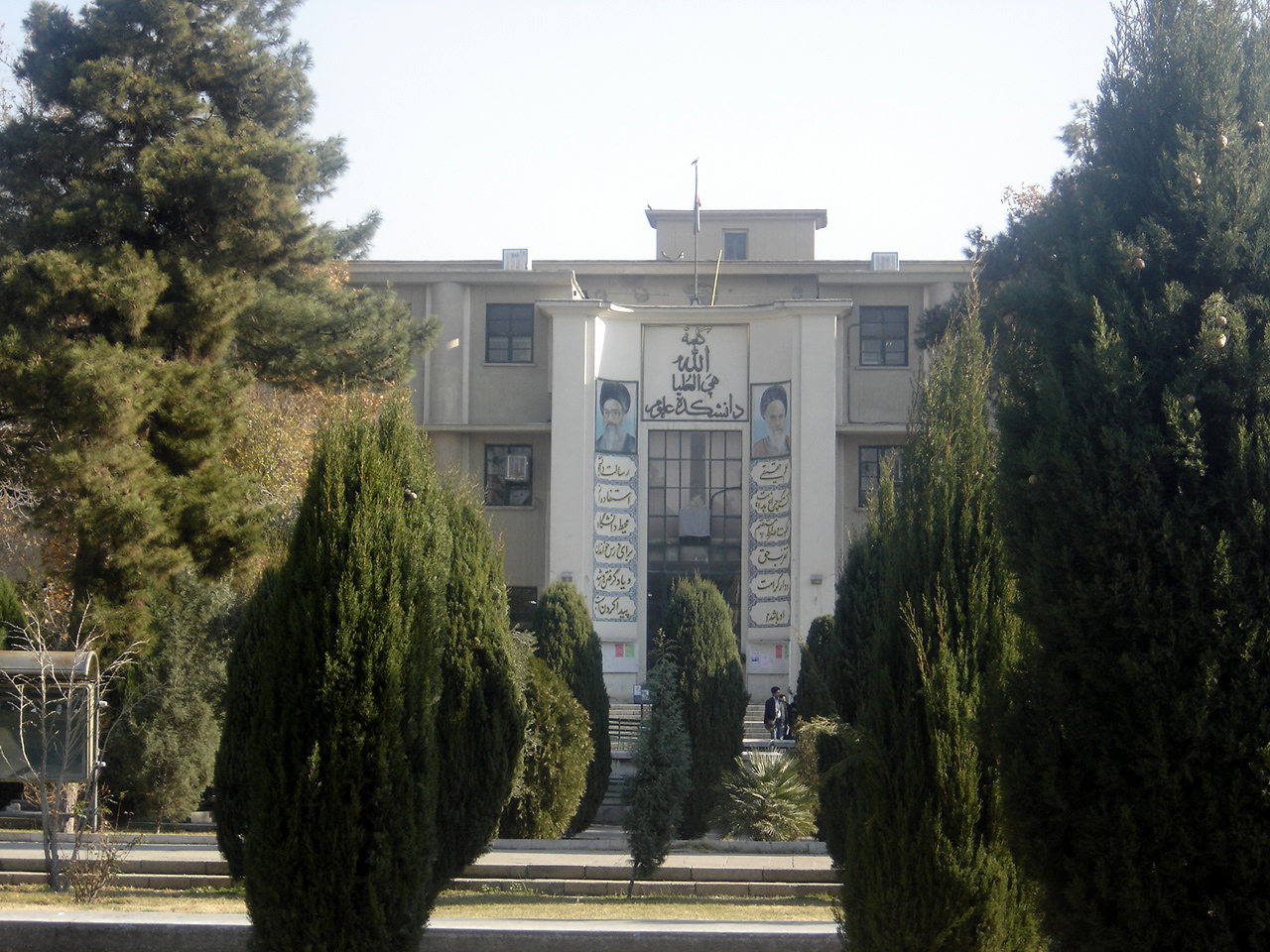
- Former name: Science Campus
- Type: Public
- Established: 1934
- Parent institution: University of Tehran
- Chairman: Vahid Niknam
- Students: 2,600
- Location: Tehran, Tehran Province, Iran; 35.7050197°N 51.3959624°E
- Language: Persian
- Website: science.ut.ac.ir/en/home
- College of Science, University of Tehran, Enghelab Avenue, Tehran, Iran

College of Science is one of the University of Tehran's colleges. It is one of the oldest postgraduate centers in Iran, which was established in 1934 under the name of College of Science. It is also called Science Campus. At present, the College of Science is the largest university unit among all Iranian colleges where basic science research is conducted. The College of Science has five schools and students study at the undergraduate, graduate, and doctoral levels there. The main College of Science building is located in the central campus of the University of Tehran, Tehran, Iran. The college has 2600 students and 130 faculty members.

== History ==
The establishment of the College of Science dates back to the establishment of the Dar ul-Funun, about 150 years ago, when the level of education was at the level of high school. Courses taught at the Dar ul-Funun included physics, chemistry, natural sciences, pharmacy, and mining, to which arithmetic, geometry, geography, and painting were gradually added.

In 1928, the plan of an institution called the Higher Teachers' College (Higher Education University) including the faculties of sciences and literature was laid. The Faculty of Science included physics-chemistry, mathematics and natural sciences. The college had two Iranian professors and seven French professors, for a total of 100 students. Mahmoud Hessabi and Gholam Hossein Rahnama were the two Iranian professors in this college.

In 1934, the proposal to establish the University of Tehran, consisting of six faculties of medicine, law, natural sciences, technology, theology and teachers' colleges, was given to the then minister Ali-Asghar Hekmat by Dr. Hesabi, Dr. Sediq and Monsieur Batliani and was approved by the Islamic Consultative Assembly in the same year. After the establishment of the University of Tehran in 1934, the literary department of the Higher Teachers' College became the Faculty of Literature and the scientific department became the Faculty of Science, as part of the University of Tehran. Of course, in 1955, the Higher Teachers' College was separated from the faculties of literature and science and began another period of its activity.

From 1934 to 1958, the Faculty of Science accepted students for a three-year bachelor's degree through exams held by the Faculty (In the form of intra-group).

The building of the Faculty of Science was inaugurated in 1951 and it was decided that instead of having different departments of science in each faculty, all basic science disciplines would be located in the Faculty of Science. In 1952, the field of physics and chemistry was divided into two independent fields of physics and chemistry and the field of natural sciences into two fields of biology and geology, and in 1959 the fields of biology and geology were formed in group independently. In 1963, due to coordination between the faculty program and foreign faculties, it was decided to increase the bachelor's degree course to 4 years, and its degree, which was called a diploma, to be recognized as a bachelor's degree and thus gain value internationally. From this year, students entered the university through the national entrance exam. Postgraduate courses were also expanded and courses organized on a unit-by-unit basis. In 1975, the name of the Mathematics Department was changed to the Department of Mathematics and Computer Science, and in 2001, it was changed to the Department of Mathematics, Statistics and Computer Science.

Since 2005, along with organizational changes at the University of Tehran, Faculty of Science has been renamed to College of Science and formed its own independent schools with an independent educational structure.

== Organizational structure ==
Organizational structure of the College of Science is as follows:

College of Science
Dean of the College
College Council
Student and Cultural Deputy	Research and Technology Deputy	Education and Training Deputy	Financial and Administrative Deputy
Student Affairs	Research Services Office	Office of Educational Services and Graduate Studies	Administrative and Personnel Affairs
Cultural Affairs	Library	Accounting
Health Affairs	Magazine office	Support Affairs
Physical Education Affairs	Computer Services Center
Management of Network and Servers of the College	Faculty Recruitment Office	Martyrs and Sacrificers Students Affairs	College-Industry Relevance Consultant	International Advisor	Public Relations Affairs
School of Physics	School of Biology	School of Chemistry	School of Mathematics, Statistics and Computer Science	School of Geology
Department of Biotechnology

== Schools ==
The College of Science has five schools and a department:

- College of Science
  - School of Mathematics, Statistics and Computer Science
    - Department of Mathematics
      - Pure Mathematics
        - Bachelor
        - Master
        - PhD
    - Department of Applied Mathematics
      - Applied Mathematics
        - Bachelor
        - Master
        - PhD
    - Department of Statistics
      - Statistics
        - Bachelor
        - Master
        - PhD
    - Department of Computer Science
      - Computer Science
        - Bachelor
        - Master
        - PhD
  - School of Physics
    - Atomic and Molecular Physics Department
      - Atomic and Molecular Physics
        - Bachelor
        - Master
        - PhD
    - Elementary Particle Physics Department
      - Elementary Particle Physics
        - Bachelor
        - Master
        - PhD
    - Gravitation and Astrophysics Department
      - Gravitation and Astrophysics
        - Bachelor
        - Master
        - PhD
    - Nuclear Physics Department
      - Nuclear Physics
        - Bachelor
        - Master
        - PhD
    - Nano-Physics Department
      - Nano-Physics
        - Master
        - PhD
  - School of Chemistry
    - Applied Chemistry Department
      - Applied Chemistry
        - Bachelor
        - Master
    - Pure Chemistry Department
        - Bachelor
      - Pure Chemistry
    - Physical Chemistry Department
      - Physical Chemistry
        - Master
        - PhD
    - Nano Chemistry Department
      - Nano Chemistry
        - Master
        - PhD
    - Analytical Chemistry Department
      - Analytical Chemistry
        - Master
        - PhD
    - Polymer Chemistry Department
      - Polymer Chemistry
        - Master
        - PhD
    - Organic Chemistry Department
      - Organic Chemistry
        - Master
        - PhD
    - Inorganic Chemistry Department
      - Inorganic Chemistry
        - Master
        - PhD
  - School of Geology
    - Department of Soft Rocks
      - Sedimentology, Stratigraphy, and Petroleum Geology
        - Master
        - PhD
    - Department of Hard Rocks
      - Petrology and Economic Geology
        - Master
        - PhD
    - Department of Engineering Geology and Tectonic
      - Engineering Geology, Structural Geology and Tectonic
        - Master
        - PhD
  - School of Biology
    - Department of Animal Biology
      - Animal Sciences
        - Bachelor
      - Animal Sciences - Biosystematics
        - Master
      - Animal Sciences - Physiology
        - Master
      - Animal Sciences - Developmental Biology
        - Master
      - Animal Biosystematics
        - PhD
      - Animal Physiology
        - PhD
      - Animal Developmental Biology
        - PhD
    - Department of Cell and Molecular Biology
      - Cell and Molecular Biology
        - Bachelor
        - Master
        - PhD
    - -
      - Biotechnology
        - Bachelor
    - Department of Microbiology
      - Microbiology
        - Bachelor
        - Master
        - PhD
      - Microbial Biotechnology
        - Master
        - PhD
    - Department of Plant Biology
      - Plant Sciences
        - Bachelor
      - Plant Sciences - Systematics and Ecology
        - Master
      - Plant Sciences - Physiology
        - Master
      - Plant Systematics
        - PhD
      - Plant Physiology
        - PhD
  - Department of Biotechnology
    - Biotechnology
      - Biotechnology
        - PhD

== Library ==
The library complex of the Science Campus started its work in 1934. Since then, many changes have taken place in this library, most of which dates back to 1955. On this date, the current building of the Science Campus was inaugurated and the library was moved to the third floor of this building located in the Central Campus of the University of Tehran. The library's collection of information resources now includes over 100,000 copies, including printed and electronic books, journals, dissertations, and CDs. The College of Science's library has the following specifications:

- College of Science
  - The Library
    - Books
      - Farsi Books
        - 27312 Copy
      - Latin Books
        - 42230 Copy
    - E-Books
      - 21761 Volume
    - Journals
      - Farsi Journals
        - 2920 Copy
      - Latin Journals
        - 18123 Copy
    - Audio & Visuals
      - Farsi Audio & Visuals
        - 200 Volume
      - Latin Audio & Visuals
        - 459 Volume
    - Thesis
      - Farsi Thesis
        - 4661 Volume
      - Latin Thesis
        - 59 Volume
    - Information Databases
      - 20 Volume

== Central Laboratory ==
The Central Laboratory includes a set of important equipment for qualitative and quantitative examination of materials, which has been established with the aim of providing research services to students and faculty members of the University of Tehran and other scientific, research and industrial centers of the country. The Central Laboratory has advanced and accurate devices, such as spectroscopic analysis, elemental analysis, thermal analysis and chromatography. The objectives of the Central Laboratory are listed below:

- Improving the use of research facilities and equipment
- Creating the necessary platform for conducting basic and applied research
- Promoting the research capacity of faculty members, graduate students and all researchers and scholars of other universities and centers
- Communication with other laboratories inside and outside the University of Tehran, scientific, research and industrial institutions and companies in order to provide mutual services
- Purchasing and equipping new devices according to the request of various academic and research fields
- Providing test results in the shortest amount of time

== Scientific Journals ==
The Journal of Science of the University of Tehran was established in 1968 and its first issue was published in the same year. In 2009, 33 volumes and each volume including four issues of this magazine have been published. Journal of Science is a scientific-research journal and publishes scientific articles in both English and Persian in the fields of basic sciences including mathematics, statistics and computer science, geology, biology, chemistry and physics. At present, this magazine is published every year with four issues and seasonally. The Journal of Science is currently indexed on the Mathematical Reviews and Chemical Abatracts. In 2009, based on the approval of the Science Campus Council and according to higher education policies, the Journal of Science was changed to two independent specialized journals under the following titles:

1. English-language magazine Geopersia: This journal is published twice a year by the School of Geology, Campus of Sciences, University of Tehran and has scientific research validity.

2. "Journal of Progress in Biological Sciences": This journal is published by the School of Biology, Campus of Sciences, University of Tehran.

== Museums ==
The College of Science has three museums:

1. Museum of Zoology:

- The Museum of Zoology or Museum of Natural History houses a precious and unique collection of invertebrates and vertebrates and was established in 1954. Using museum preservation methods such as taxidermy, stabilization in chemical solutions, etching, resin storage and skeleton building, the collection of Iranian animals began and led to the creation of the first zoological museum in Iran. The museum is located in the School of Biology of the Science Campus.

2. Herbarium:

- The most complete and reliable reference of Iranian flora. There are 167 families of vascular plants in Iran, which include 1215 genera, some of them have only one species and some of them have up to about 800 species. The total number of taxa in Iran is about 8000, which includes about 6417 species, 611 subspecies, 465 varieties, and 83 hybrids. Of these, about 1810 are endemic to Iran. The current statistics are related to the studies conducted up to 2000 in the central herbarium of the University of Tehran. The museum is located in the School of Biology of the Science Campus.

3. Microbial Collection:

- Microbial Collection section contains a diverse set of microorganisms and provides research-executive services. The museum is located in the School of Biology of the Science Campus.

== See also ==
- Faculty of Theology and Islamic Studies of the University of Tehran
- Faculty of Letters and Humanities of the University of Tehran
- Tehran School of Political Science
- Institute of Biochemistry and Biophysics
