= Dastur al-Muluk =

Safavid Iranian administrative handbook

Dastūr al-Mulūk (Persian: دستور الملوک) by Moḥammad Rafiʿ Anṣāri known as Mirzā Rafiʿā, is one of only three surviving administrative handbooks from early 18th-century Safavid Iran and an important research tool for scholars in Iranology. The Persian manuscript was edited during the 1960s by the Iranian scholar Mohammad Taqi Danesh Pajouh.

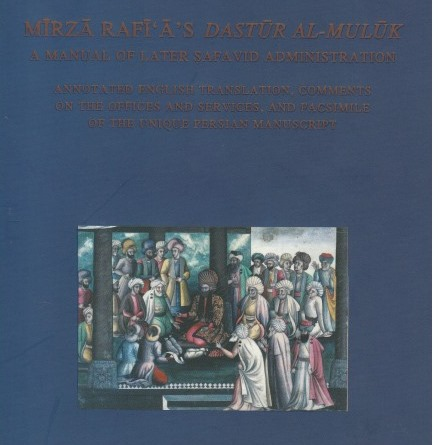
The cover of Marcinkowski's Mirza Rafi‘a's Dastur al-Muluk, 2002

A Russian translation by Dr Vil'danova appeared in Tashkent, Uzbekistan, in the 1990s. In 2002, an annotated English translation (ISBN 983-9379-26-7), which contains also a facsimile of what was then thought among scholars to be the complete manuscript, was published and translated into English for the first time by the German scholar Christoph Marcinkowski, based on his dissertation. Already in 2000, this dissertation was awarded by then Iranian President Mohammad Khatami the First Prize for Best Research on Iranian Culture Award for the Year 2000 (International Category) by the Iranian Ministry of Culture. A Persian translation of Marcinkowski's 2002 study by Ali Kordabadi and Mansur Sefatgol appeared in 1385 AH solar (2006 CE) in Tehran at Markaz-e Asnad va Tarikh-e Diplomasi (published by the Iranian Ministry of Foreign Affairs).

Subsequently, the Iranian scholar Iraj Afshar discovered and edited the remainder of the manuscript. This part, too, was translated into English and discussed by Dr. Marcinkowski in the Zeitschrift der Deutschen Morgenländischen Gesellschaft, the journal of the German Oriental Society (see below).

== See also ==
- Iranian studies
- Safavids
