= Mohammad-Ali Najafi (governor) =

Iranian politician

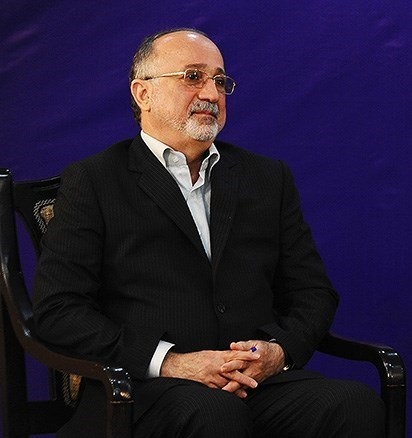

Governor of Alborz Province
- In office 13 September 2017 – 17 September 2018
- President: Hassan Rouhani
- Preceded by: Hamid Tahaei
- Succeeded by: Azizollah Shahbazi

Governor of Gilan Province
- In office 12 October 2013 – 13 September 2017
- President: Hassan Rouhani
- Preceded by: Keyhan Hashemnia
- Succeeded by: Mostafa Salari

Personal details
- Born: 1956 (age 69–70) Astaneh-ye Ashrafiyeh, Iran
- Party: Moderation and Development Party

Mohammad-Ali Najafi (Persian: محمدعلی نجفی; born 1956) is an Iranian politician who served as the governor of Gilan Province.
