= Public Law 113-100 =

2014 United States federal law

- Long title: To deny admission to the United States to any representative to the United Nations who has engaged in espionage activities against the United States, poses a threat to United States national security interests, or has engaged in a terrorist activity against the United States.
- Announced in: the 113th United States Congress
- Sponsored by: Sen. Ted Cruz (R-TX)
- Number of co-sponsors: 0

Codification
- U.S.C. sections affected: 8 U.S.C. § 1102, 8 U.S.C. § 1182

Legislative history
- Introduced in the Senate as S. 2195 by Sen. Ted Cruz (R-TX) on April 1, 2014; Committee consideration by United States Senate Committee on the Judiciary; Passed the Senate on April 7, 2014 (unanimous consent); Passed the House on April 10, 2014 (unanimous consent); Signed into law by President Barack Obama on April 16, 2014

Public Law 113-100 is a law that "ban(s) Iran's new United Nations ambassador, who has ties to a terrorist group, from entering the United States." Iran's proposed ambassador at the time, Hamid Aboutalebi, was controversial due to his involvement in the Iran hostage crisis, in which a number of American diplomats from the US embassy in Tehran were held captive from 1979 until 1981. Aboutalebi said he did not participate in the takeover of the US embassy, but was brought in to translate and negotiate following the occupation. President Barack Obama told Iran that Aboutalebi's selection was not "viable" and Congress reacted by passing this law to ban his presence in the United States. Since the United Nations' headquarters is located in New York City, Aboutalebi needs a U.S. visa in order to represent Iran in the United Nations.

Originally S. 2195, the bill was signed into law on April 16, 2014, by President Barack Obama.

== Background ==
The Iran hostage crisis, referred to in Persian as تسخیر لانه جاسوسی امریکا (literally "Conquest of the American Spy Den,"), was a diplomatic crisis between Iran and the United States. Fifty-two American diplomats and citizens were held hostage for 444 days (November 4, 1979, to January 20, 1981), after a group of Iranian students supporting the Iranian Revolution took over the US Embassy in Tehran. President Carter called the hostages "victims of terrorism and anarchy," adding that "the United States will not yield to blackmail."

The crisis was described by the western media as an entanglement of "vengeance and mutual incomprehension." In Iran, the hostage taking was widely seen as a blow against the United States and its influence in Iran, its perceived attempts to undermine the Iranian Revolution, and its longstanding support of the recently overthrown Shah of Iran, Mohammad Reza Pahlavi. Following his overthrow, the Shah was allowed into the U.S. for medical treatment. The Iranians wanted the United States to return the Shah to them for trial of the crimes committed by him during his reign on ordinary citizens with the help of his secret police, the SAVAK. In Iran the asylum granted by the U.S. to the Shah was seen as American complicity in the atrocities meted by the Shah on the Iranian people. In the United States, the hostage-taking was seen as an outrage violating the principle of international law granting diplomats immunity from arrest and diplomatic compounds' inviolability.

The episode reached a climax when, after failed attempts to negotiate a release, the United States military attempted a rescue operation off ships such as the USS Nimitz and USS Coral Sea that were patrolling the waters near Iran. On April 24, 1980, Operation Eagle Claw resulted in a failed mission, the deaths of eight American servicemen, one Iranian civilian, and the destruction of two aircraft.

On July 27, 1980, the former Shah died; then, in September, Iraq invaded Iran. These two events led the Iranian government to enter negotiations with the U.S., with Algeria acting as a mediator. The hostages were formally released into United States custody the day after the signing of the Algiers Accords, just minutes after the new American president, Ronald Reagan, was sworn into office.

Considered a pivotal episode in the history of Iran–United States relations, political analysts cite the crisis as having weighed heavily on Jimmy Carter's presidency and run for reelection in the 1980 presidential election. In Iran, the crisis strengthened the prestige of the Ayatollah Ruhollah Khomeini and the political power of those who supported theocracy and opposed any normalization of relations with the West. The crisis also marked the beginning of U.S. legal action resulting in economic sanctions against Iran, to further weaken ties between Iran and the United States.

== Provisions of the law ==
This summary is based largely on the summary provided by the Congressional Research Service, a public domain source.

The law amends the Foreign Relations Authorization Act, Fiscal Years 1990 and 1991 to direct the President of the United States to deny U.S. admission to any representative of the United Nations (U.N.) who: (1) has been found to have been engaged in espionage activities or a terrorist activity against the United States or its allies, and (2) may pose a threat to U.S. national security interests.

== Procedural history ==
113th S.2195 was introduced into the United States Senate on April 1, 2014, by Senator Ted Cruz (R-TX). It was referred to the United States Senate Committee on the Judiciary. On April 7, 2014, the Senate voted to pass the bill by unanimous consent, and the United States House of Representatives voted likewise three days later. The bill was signed into law on April 16, 2014, by President Barack Obama.

== Debate and discussion ==
Identical legislation was introduced in the House by Representative Doug Lamborn (R-CO) who said that the selection by Iran of Aboutalebi as their U.N. ambassador was "unconscionable and unacceptable." He argued that this legislation was needed in order to give the President the "authority he needs to deny this individual a visa."

On April 10, 2014, it was still unclear whether President Barack Obama would choose to sign or veto the bill. White House press secretary Jay Carney said that "we've made it clear and have communicated to the Iranians that the selection they've put forward is not viable, and we're continuing to make that understood," but had no comment about what the president was expected to do about the legislation. Newspaper The Hill described the possibility of vetoing the bill as "politically unthinkable." President Obama's position was complicated because he was currently in negotiations with Iran regarding their nuclear program.

An additional problem was that refusing Aboutalebi's entry to the United States would violate a 1947 treaty agreement that was a prerequisite for the United Nations to locate their headquarters in New York City.

== See also ==
- List of bills in the 113th United States Congress
- United Nations Headquarters
- Acts of the 113th United States Congress
- Iran–United States relations during the Obama administration
