= Mahdi Fadaei Mehrabani =

Mahdi Fadaei Mehrabani (Persian: مهدی فدایی مهربانی, born 1982) is an Iranian writer and researcher in Islamic philosophy, mysticism and political philosophy. He is one of the winners of Farabi International Award, 2009 and the Winner of Iran’s Book of the Year Awards, 2016. Mehrabani has written several books and articles and currently is an assistant professor at University of Tehran. Mehrabani used to be a researcher at State University of New York (Stony Brook) from 2017 to 2018.

== Works ==
=== Books ===
- The Necessity of Shi'ite Spirituality as a Global Ethics for The Contemporary World : Henry Corbin’s View, in the "Spirituality and Global Ethics", edited by: Mahmoud Masaeli (University of Ottawa), Cambridge Scholar Publishing, 2017
- Mahdi, Fadaei Mehrabani (2013). We believe in one God. p. 558. ISBN 978-9-641-85249-0.
- Mehrabani, Mahdi Fadaei (2014). Hekmat, Marefat va Siasat Dar Iran. p. 552. ISBN 978-9-641-85324-4.
- Religion in Itself or Exclusivist Interpretation: Is Religion Inherently Violent? In "The Root Causes of Terrorism: A Religious Studies Perspective", edited by: Mahmoud Masaeli (University of Ottawa) and Rico Sneller (Leiden University), Cambridge Scholar Publishing, 2016
- What is called Politics?, Tehran: Falat Publications, 2016
- Wisdom, Knowledge and Politics in Iran: From Sadr-Al-Din Shirazi to the Contemporary Political Theosphers, Tehran: Ney Publications, 2014
- Standing other side of the death: Henry Corbin’s Responses to Martin Heidegger from Shia's Philosophy Perspective, Tehran: Ney Publications, 2012
- Mehrabani, Mahdi Fadaei (2009). Peydaee Andishe Siyasi Erfani dar Iran: (Rise of Mystic Political Thought in Iran). p. 314. ISBN 978-9-641-85107-3.

=== Selected articles ===
- Mahdi, Fadaei Mehrabani (2016). "وجوه عرفانی در اندیشۀ سیاسی سید جعفر کشفی". Political Quarterly. 46 (1): 171–188. doi:10.22059/JPQ.2016.57327.
- Moses Hess’s Socialistic Interpretation of Spinoza, Siyasatname Magazine No. 2, (2016)
- Shia Theology's View on Hope, Iran's Sociological Association Magazine, Tehran, Iran, (winter 2013)
- Mehdi, Fadaei Mehrabani (2012). "Theological Particularism and Ideological Politics in Judaism". Political Science (Karaj Azad University). 9 (23): 91–112.
- Review of “En Islam Iranien” By Henri Corbin, Mehrnameh Magazine, Tehran, Iran, (December 2013)
- Mehdi, Fadaei Mehrabani (1392). "Dialogue and the Ways of Truth; A Discussion About the Origins and Philosophical Validity of the Essay Dialogue". Sooreh. 1 (70–71): 174–178.
- Mehdi, Fadaei Mehrabani (2013). "Mystical Field; Mystical Tendencies in Contemporary Iranian Seminaries". Sooreh. 1 (68–69): 89–92.
- Theosophy of Avicenna, Farhikhtegan, Tehran, Iran, (August 2013)
- Mehdi, Fadaei Mehrabani (2013). "Criticism and Review of the Correction of Qashiriyyeh Treatise, Introduction and Criticism". Ketabé Mahé Falsafeh Magazine. Tehran, Iran.
- Philosophical Exegesis of the Qadr Nights in Shia Theology, Iranian Philosophical Society, Javidan Kherad Quarterly, * Vol. 19, Tehran Iran, (fall 2012)
- Mehdi, Fadaei Mehrabani (2013). "Political Theosophy of Qutb al-Din Neyrizi". Islamic Government Quarterly. 17 (3): 104–124.
- Henry Corbin's Criticism on Orientalism in Western Philosophy and Theology, Ketab-é Mah-é Falsafeh, Vol. 4, Tehran, Iran, (July 2011)
- A Comparative Study of Humanism in Seyyed Hussein Nasr and Mohammad Shabestari, Karaj University Quarterly of Politics, Tehran, Iran, (summer 2011)
- Political Thought of Nasafi, Politics Quarterly, University of Tehran, Vol. 40, Tehran, Iran, (Fall 2010)
- Dominance: Theory in Ibn-Al-Fara's Political Thought, Pazhoohesh Siasat Nazari Quarterly, Tehran, Iran, (summer and fall 2010)
- An Introduction to Relation between Epistemological and Ontological System in 'Aziz Nasafi|Aziz Al-Din Nasafi's Theosophy, Motaleat-é Falsafi Kalami Quarterly, Qom University, Qom, Iran, (summer 2008)
- Criticism on the Place Of Etymology In Methodology Of Ahmad Fardid, Pazhoohesh-é Zaban Va Adab-é Farsi Quarterly, Tehran, Iran, (Spring and Summer 2008)
- Tracing the Concept of Essential Movement in Theosophy of Mulla Sadra, Islamic Studies Quarterly, Ferdowsi University Press, Mashhad, Iran,( winter 2008)
- What Is An Essential Movement? From Nasafi to Mulla Sadra, Sadra Islamic Philosophy Center Quarterly, Vol. 53, Tehran, Iran, (2008)
- Nasafi's View on the Unification of Mysticism and Politics, Pazhoohesh Siasat Nazari Quarterly, Tehran, Iran, spring 2008
- From The Outside World: Realism's Continuity in Contemporary Life, Kheradnameh Hamshahri Magazine, Vol. 23, Tehran, Iran, (February 2008)
- Modernity as a Dialogue: The Frankfort School and Modernity: A Case Study of Habermas, Kheradnameh Hamshahri Magazine, Vol. 19, Tehran, Iran, (October 2007)
- The Role of the Media in Social Health, Pazhoohesh va Sanjesh Quarterly, Vol. 49, Tehran, Iran, (Spring 2007)
- In Search of the Language, Kheradnameh Hamshahri Magazine, Vol. 16, Tehran, Iran, (July 2007)
- Continuation of Sheykh Ansari's School of Jurisprudence in Politics, Kheradnameh Hamshahri Magazine, Vol. 18, Tehran, Iran, (September 2007)
- Criticism on Post Modern Mysticism, Kheradnameh Hamshahri Magazine, Vol. 20, Tehran, Iran, (November 2007)
- The Influence of Averroes' Philosophy on Scholasticism in Western Philosophy and Theology, Safir Magazine, Karaj University, Vol. 19 and 20, Tehran, Iran, (summer 2005)
- Mehrabani, Mahdi Fadaei (2020). "The Concept of the Social Contract in the Shi'a Gnostic Tradition: A Case Study of Quṭb al-Dīn Nayrīzī". Journal of Shi'a Islamic Studies. 13 (3/4): 457–488. doi:10.1353/isl.2020.0010. S2CID 252763586.
- Mehdi, Fadaei Mehrabani; Moeini, Amin (2017). "بررسی تطبیقی اندیشۀ میرزا ملکم‌خان و جلال آل‌احمد؛ از تجددگرایی تا هویت ایرانی-اسلامی". Political Quarterly. 47 (3): 705–719. doi:10.22059/JPQ.2017.62860.
- Mahdi, Fadaei Mehrabani (2022). "The similarity of criticism in the quarrel between constitutionalism and Iranshahri theory (Critical study of the intellectual conflict between Davood Farihi and Seyed Javad Tabatabai)". Social Theories of Muslim Thinkers. 12 (2): 115–142.
