= Farabi International Award =

Iranisn humanitarian award

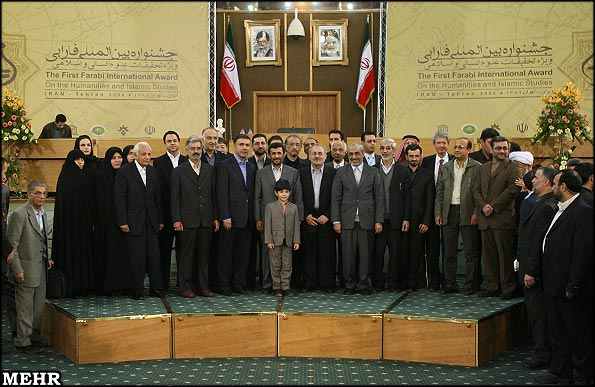
- Recipients of the 2008 awards
- Awarded for: Outstanding achievements in research and innovation, in fields related to humanities
- Country: Iran
- Presented by: Iranian Ministry of Science
- First award: 2008
- Website: www.farabiaward.ir/en/

The Farabi International Award is given annually by the Iranian Ministry of Science, Research and Technology to individuals who have made outstanding contributions to humanities. Farabi Award winners become a member of Iran's National Elites Foundation.

== Outstanding winners ==
- Iraj Afshar
- Fathollah Mojtabaei
- William Chittick
- Wilferd Madelung (2013)
- Carl W. Ernst
- Hamid Algar
- Jafar Shahidi
- Gholamhossein Ebrahimi Dinani
- Pirouz Mojtahedzadeh
- Mostafa Mohaghegh Damad
- Charles-Henri de Fouchécour
- Michael Cook (historian)
- Richard N. Frye
- Abouzar Fattahizadeh
- Gary Legenhausen
- Abdollah Javadi-Amoli
- Reza Davari Ardakani
- Mehdi Mohaghegh
- Ahmad Samiei Gilani
- Hamid Ahmadi (historian)
- Mahdi Fadaei Mehrabani
- Murtada Sharif 'Askari
- Herman Landolt
- Sadegh Ayenevand
- Ezzatollah Fouladvand
- Gholamhossein Mosaheb
- Mohammad-Ali Eslami Nodooshan
- Frank Hole
- Javad Tabatabai
