= Mostafa Salari =

Iranian politician

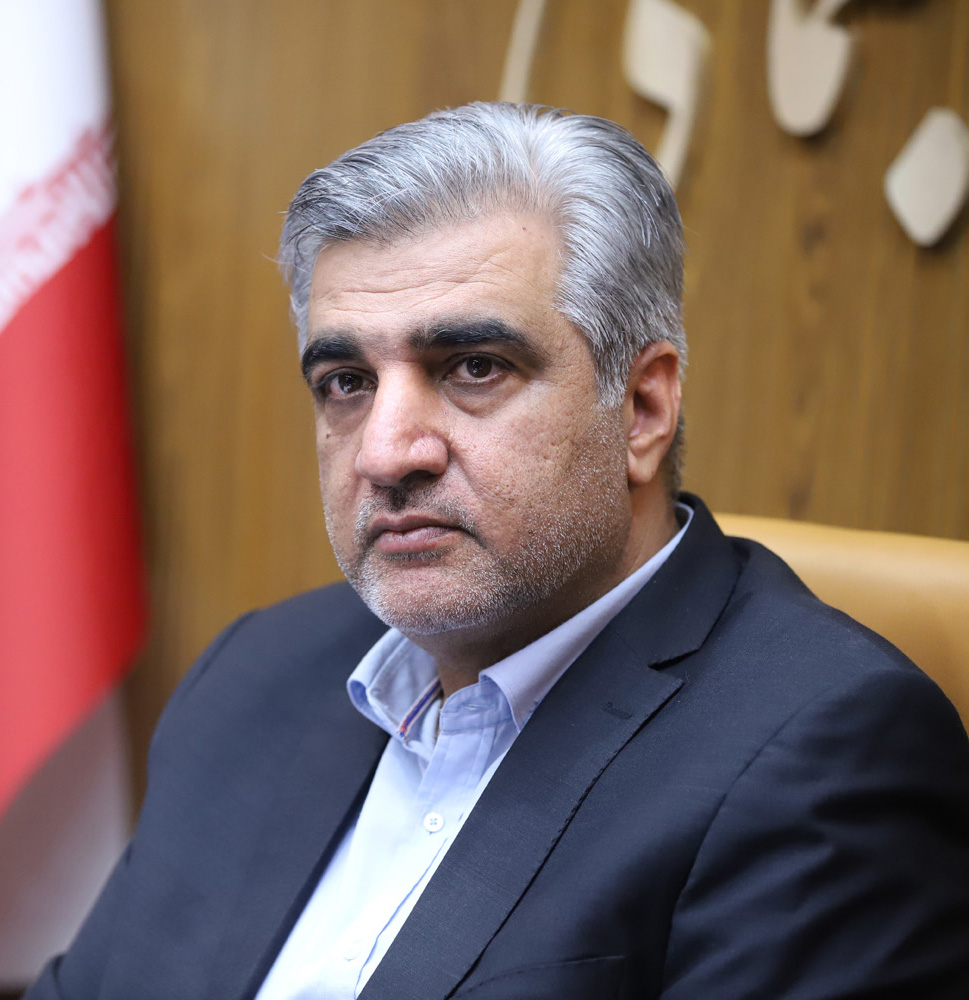

CEO of the Social Security Organization
- In office 8 October 2024 – 12 August 2026
- Appointed by: Ahmad Meydari
- President: Masoud Pezeshkian
- Preceded by: Mir-Hashem Mousavi
- Succeeded by: Gholam-Hossein Mohammadi (acting)
- In office 25 June 2019 – 9 September 2021
- Appointed by: Mohammad Shariatmadari
- President: Hassan Rouhani
- Preceded by: Mohammad-Taghi Nourbakhsh Anoushiravan Mohseni Bandpay (acting) Mohammad Hassan Zeda (acting)
- Succeeded by: Mir-Hashem Mousavi

Governor of Gilan province
- In office 24 September 2017 – 25 June 2019
- President: Hassan Rouhani
- Preceded by: Mohammad-Ali Najafi
- Succeeded by: Arsalan Zare

Governor of Bushehr province
- In office 4 December 2013 – 24 September 2017
- President: Hassan Rouhani
- Preceded by: Fereidon Hasanvand
- Succeeded by: Abdolkarim Geravand

Personal details
- Born: 1976 (age 49–50) Dashtestan County, Bushehr province
- Education: Islamic Azad University (Bachelor of Law); University of Tehran (Master of Law, Ph.D. in Law)
- Occupation: Politician

Mostafa Salari (born 1976, Shabankareh) is an Iranian politician and jurist who formerly served CEO of the Social Security Organization from 2024 to 2026 for second time.

He served as the Governor of Bushehr province from December 2013 to September 2017 and as the Governor of Gilan province from September 2017 to June 2019. After that, he served as the CEO of the Social Security Organization from June 2019 to September 2021.

Salari holds a Master's and Ph.D. in law from the University of Tehran and has served as a lecturer there.

He began his career at the Ministry of Education and later worked at the Ministry of Oil, including a position at the Special Economic Energy Zone of Pars in 2002.

== Political Involvement ==
Salari coordinated the election headquarters in southern regions during the 2013 presidential election.

== Initiatives at the Social Security Organization ==
Upon his appointment as CEO, Salari initiated several measures, including the adjustment of retirement pensions and the implementation of electronic prescriptions and online services.
