= Keyhan Hashemnia =

Iranian politician

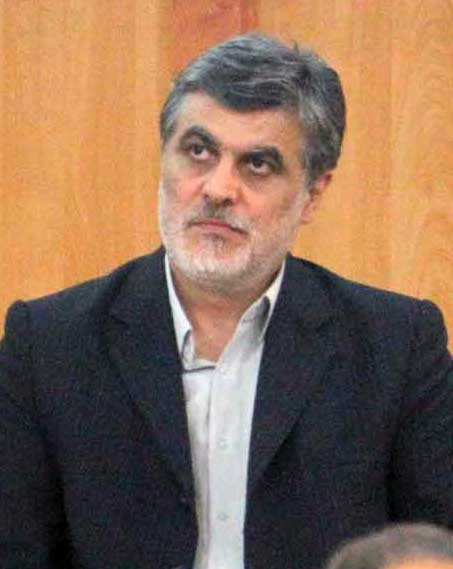

Governor of Gilan Province
- In office 3 September 2012 – 12 October 2013
- President: Mahmoud Ahmadinejad
- Preceded by: Mahdi Sa'adati
- Succeeded by: Mohammad-Ali Najafi

Deputy of Mostazafan Foundation for Culture
- In office Unknown–2000
- Chairman: Mohammad Forouzandeh

Personal details
- Born: 1960 (age 65–66) Astara, Iran
- Education: University of Tehran
- Occupation: Academic
- Profession: Sociology

Military service
- Allegiance: Iran
- Branch/service: IRGC
- Unit: The Revolutionary Guards
- Battles/wars: Iran–Iraq War

Keyhan Hashemnia (Persian: کیهان هاشم‌نیا) is an Iranian politician who served as the governor of Gilan Province. He was previously Deputy Governor of Gilan for planning from May 2008 until June 2011.

== Affiliation ==
Hashemnia has relations with Society of Devotees of the Islamic Revolution and Mahmoud Ahmadinejad.

Political offices
Preceded by Mehdi Sa'adati	Governor of Gilan Province; 2012-2013	Succeeded by Mohammad-Ali Najafi
