= Ayandeh (magazine) =

Iranian magazine (1925–1960)

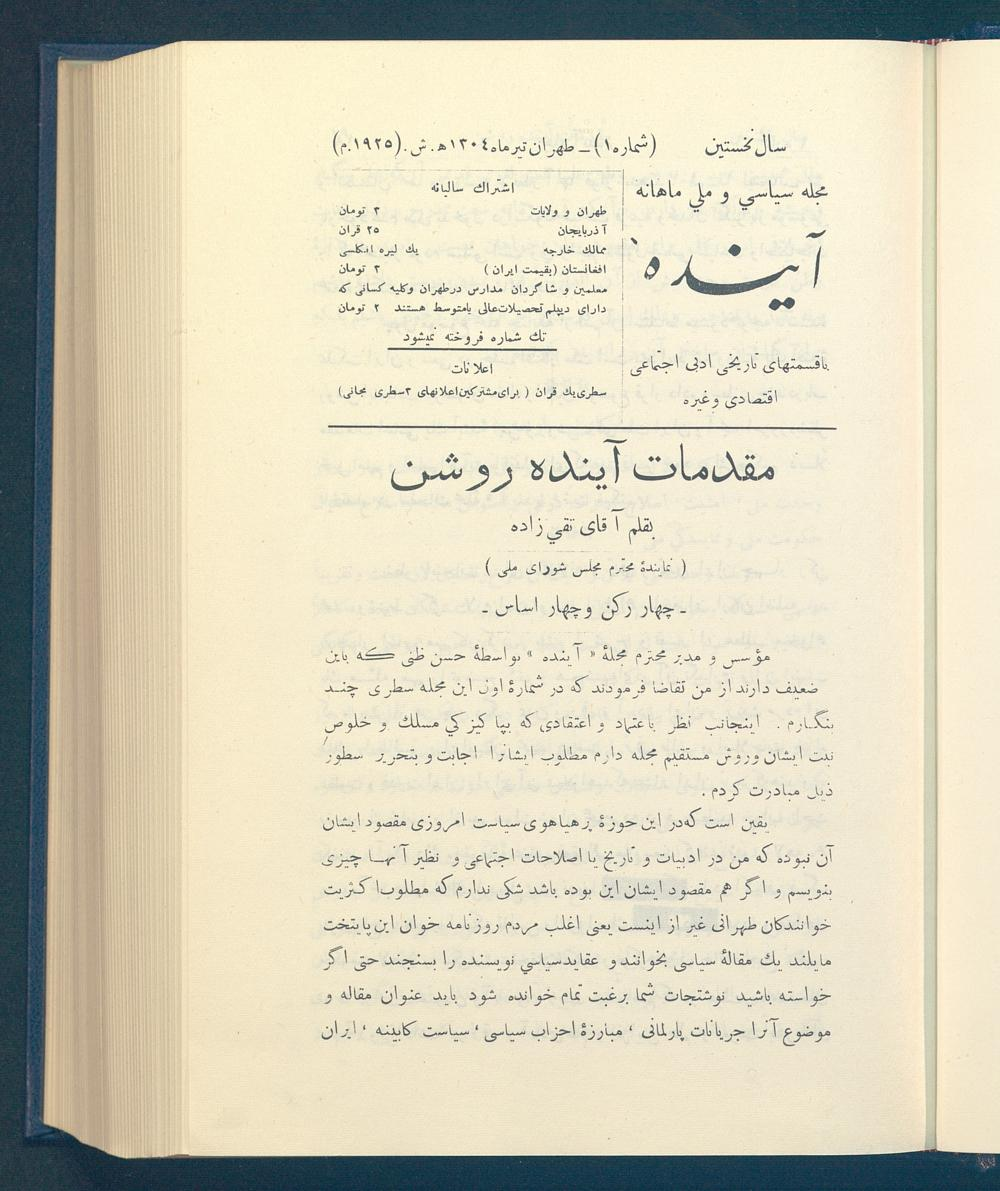
- Ayandeh: volume 1, issue 1, title page
- Editor: Mahmoud Afshar; Iraj Afshar
- Categories: Culture; politics
- Frequency: Monthly
- Founder: Mahmoud Afshar
- Founded: 1925
- First issue: June 1925
- Final issue: April 1960
- Country: Iran
- Based in: Tehran
- Language: Persian

The Iranian monthly journal Ayandeh (Persian: آینده; English: "future") was founded in Tehran by Mahmoud Afshar (1893–1983) in 1925. It was published in three issues, with 46 numbers in total. The first number went from June 1925 to March 1928 (24 issues), the second from October 1944 to March 1945 (16 issues), and the third from October 1959 to April 1960 (6 issues). Afshar, who had studied political science in Switzerland, wished to disseminate the Persian language as well as the idea of Iran's national unity in his politically and culturally oriented journal. Articles and poems by over 90 authors took up historical and contemporary topics from politics, economy, education, and culture. Seyyed Hasan Taghizade, editor of the journal Kaveh (1916–1922), was among its well-known authors, as was Hoseyn Kazemzadeh-Iranshahr, editor of the journal Iranshahr (1922–1927). Up-to-date, historically relevant political documents as well as pictures of politicians and translations of European literature were also published. Due to countless acts of censorship against the press in Iran, Ayandeh was discontinued in 1960. After the Iranian Revolution of 1979, Iraj Afshar (1925–2011), the son of Mahmoud Afshar, republished the journal, now with a more scientific focus, until 1994.
