= Mohammad Taqi Danesh Pajouh =

Persian and Islamic studies scholar

- محمدتقی دانش‌پژوه
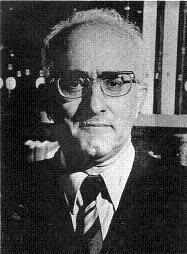
- Born: July 5, 1911; Nandal, Amol, Iran
- Died: December 17, 1996 (aged 85); Tehran, Iran
- Burial place: Namavaran Segment, Behesht-e Zahra
- Education: University of Tehran
- Occupations: Translation; Writer; Encyclopedia; Musician; Orientalism
- Organization(s): Senate of Iran; National Library of Iran; Academy of Persian Language and Literature; Faculty of Theology and Islamic Studies University of Tehran; Library, Museum and Document Center of Iran Parliament
- Known for: Father Codicology of Iran
- Notable work: Dastur al-Muluk; Zakhireye Khwarazmshahi
- Movement: Farhang Iran Zamin with Manouchehr Sotoudeh, Iraj Afshar, Abbas Zaryab
- Children: Dr. Mohammad Danesh Pajouh
- Father: Mirza Ahmad Darkaei Delarestaghi
- Awards: Iran's Book of the Year Awards

Mohammad Taqi Danesh Pajouh or Mohammad Taghi Daneshpajouh (Persian: محمدتقی دانش‌پژوه; born 1911 in Amol and died 1996) was a writer, musician, translator, orientalist and Iranian scholar, a member of the Academy of Persian Language and Literature, professor at the University of Tehran and the father codicology of Iran.

== Biography ==
He entered the Faculty of Law at Tehran University and took his bachelor's degree in 1941. He served for decades as deputy librarian at Tehran of Political Science before joining the Department of History of the Faculty of Theology at that school. In addition to editing and publishing works of others, he authored a number of articles of his own.

He also traveled to obtain bibliographic and manuscript information and to order it from the University of Tehran to Baghdad, Najaf, Karbala and Kazemin in Iraq, Medina and Mecca in Saudi Arabia, Moscow, Leningrad in Russia, Tbilisi, Dushanbe, Tashkent, Bukhara, Samarkand, and Baku in Central Asia, Paris, Munich, Leiden, Utrecht, and Istanbul in Europe and continued to traveled to Cambridge, Boston, Princeton, Ann Arbor, Michigan, Chicago and New York in the United States. Danesh Pajouh became an honorary member of French-Asian Association and Institut Français de Recherche en Iran, for has been honored for its extensive knowledge of Persian texts and for its philosophy, logic, literature, theology, librarianship, and cataloging of oriental manuscripts. He was a professor at the Faculty of Theology at the University of Tehran. He has a high rank in cataloging of Persian and Arabic manuscripts, being kept in Iranian and foreign libraries. Danesh Pajouh together with Iraj Afshar, Manouchehr Sotoudeh, Mostafa Mogharebi and Abbas Zaryab Khoei, founded Farhang Iran Zamin Magazine.

== See also ==
- Dastur al-Muluk
