= Hamid Ahmadi (historian) =

Historian of modern Iranian history (born 1945)

Hamid Ahmadi (Persian: حمید احمدی; born April 15, 1945 in Sari, Iran) is a historian of modern Iranian history. He received his Msc in Naval Studies, M.A. in Political Science and worked on his Ph.D. in this field at the Free University of Berlin. Ahmadi was a member of the Iranian Military-Naval Strategic Committee and military adviser to the defence minister in 1979 and military adviser to former Iranian president Abulhassan Banisadr in 1980 to 1981.

He is the founder and director of the Research Association for Iranian Oral History (RAIOH), which aims to expand knowledge of recent and contemporary Iranian history and politics by covering more general aspects of social history. In pursuit of these objectives, the association conducts oral history interviews and also collects documents, both manuscript and printed. While RAIOH has interviewed many leading politicians, diplomats and soldiers, it also tries to preserve for posterity the ideas, sentiments, experience, lives and what the French Annales School calls the mentalities of those not belonging to the elite—some of whom come from the lower-middle-class and even the working class.

== Publications ==
=== List of the books published (in Persian) ===
- History of the Iranian Navy (1975)
- Study of Arab-Israel war (1975)
- Study political policy of Tudeh Party of Iran 1979-83 (1988)
- History of the Iranian Republican and Dr. Erani Group 1926-37 (1991)
- History of the Iranian Communist Party 1927-1931 (1992)
- History of the Edalat Party of Iran, 1917-1920 (1993)
- The recollections of Bozorg Alavi, Berlin (1998)
- The recollections of Parviz Ekteshafi: Iranian Air Force (1999)
- The recollections of Banisadr, The first president of Iran (2001)
- A study of the Islamic revolution in Iran(2001)
- The recollections of Morteza Zarbakht: Iranian Air Force(2002)
- The recollections of Najmi Alavi: Iranian Women's movement (2005)
- The recollections of Reza Taheri: Iranian Peasant movement(2006)

=== Printed collection ===
- Collection of the documents of the Iranian socialist and communist parties, organizations and groups (1917–1990).
- The documents of Hamid Ahmadi at the "International Institute of Social History" in Amsterdam.
- Printed collection from the Iranian political and cultural organizations from 1905 to 2004 over 100 collections and over 350 hard-bound volumes.

=== Oral History collection ===
Video oral history interviews (1986–2005) with 60 Iranian activists from the fields of politics and the arts over 600 hours.

== Sources ==
- Hamid Ahmadi
- Hamid Ahmadi
