= Mahdi Ahouie =

Iranian political scientist

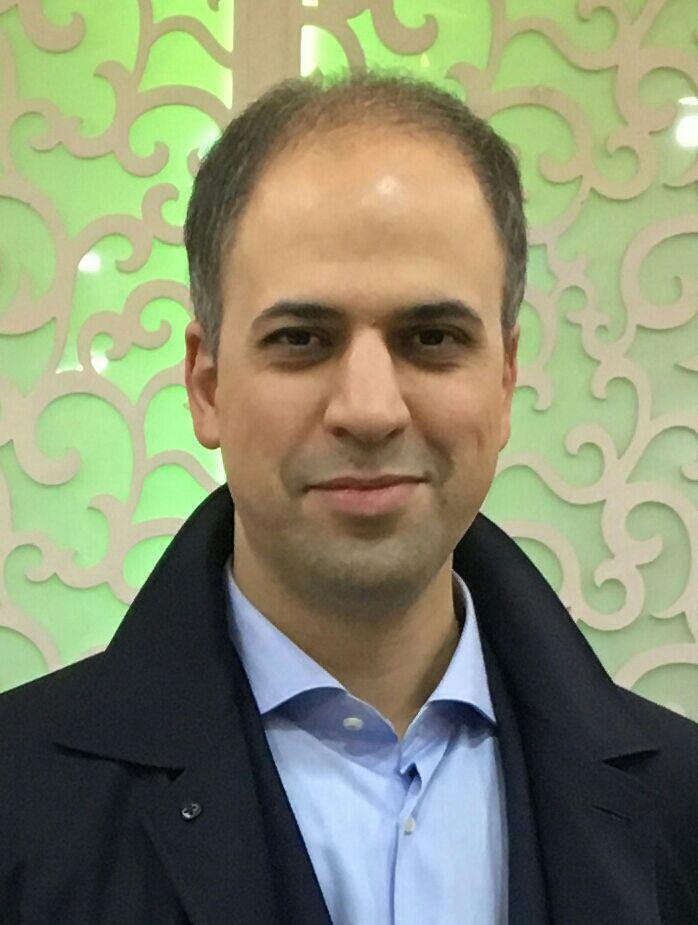
- Born: 1977 (age 48–49); Tehran

Academic background
- Education: Graduate Institute of International and Development Studies

Academic work
- Institutions: University of Tehran
- Main interests: Israel's foreign policy, Middle Eastern politics, Iranian foreign relations

Mahdi Ahouie (born 1977) is an Iranian political scientist, and assistant professor of international politics, and member of the Department of Iranian Studies at the University of Tehran. In April 2025 he was appointed Vice-President of the Iranology Foundation in Tehran. He is also working as a psychoanalyst. He has also been Post-doctoral Research Fellow at the Foundation for Interreligious and Intercultural Research and Dialogue in Geneva. Ahouie is known for his research on Israel's foreign policy, Middle Eastern politics and Iranian foreign relations.

== See also ==
- Ahmad Sayyed Javadi
- Middle power
- Israel lobby in the United States
