= Iraj Afshar =

Iranian bibliographer, historian (1925–2011)

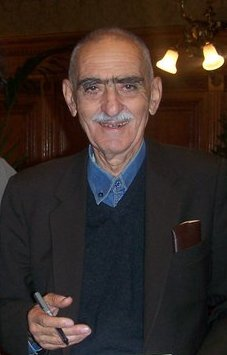
- Born: 8 October 1925; Tehran, Sublime State of Iran
- Died: 9 March 2011 (aged 85); Tehran, Iran
- Resting place: Number 300 Tomb, Behesht-e Zahra Cemetery
- Citizenship: Iranian
- Education: University of Tehran
- Occupations: Writer, historian, Iranologist
- Spouse: Shayesteh Afsharieh (1945–1996, her death)
- Children: 4
- Relatives: Mahmoud Afshar (father); Nosrat Barazandeh (mother)

Iraj Afshar (Persian: ایرج افشار; 8 October 1925 – 9 March 2011) was a bibliographer, historian, scholar, professor, and a figure in the field of Persian studies. Afshar was a professor emeritus of the University of Tehran. He was a consulting editor of Encyclopædia Iranica at Columbia University.

== Biography ==
Iraj Afshar was born on 8 October 1925 in Tehran, Iran to parents Nosrat Barazandeh and Mahmoud Afshar. He attended the Zoroastrian Shāpour Secondary School and Firouz-Bahrām High School in Tajrish, Tehran. In 1945, he married Shayesteh Afsharieh and together they had four sons.

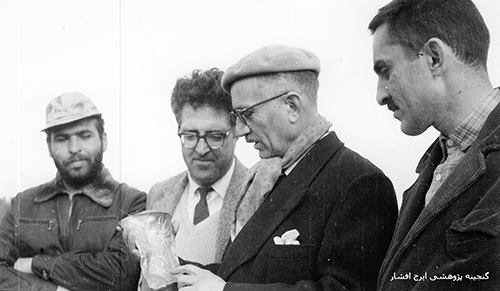
Right to left: Iraj Afshar, Allah-Yar Saleh, Abbas Zaryab, and Reza Mostofowi in Marlik, 1962

Iraj Afshar recorded the monuments of Yazd in his three-volume "Yādegār-hāye Yazd (Monuments of Yazd)". He was known as "the doyen of standard Persian language bibliographers". Afshar played a significant role in the development of the field of Iranology in Iran and throughout the world during the second half of the 20th century. He was the editor of Sokhan, a prolific Iranology journal, under the responsibility of Parviz Natel-Khanlari and also the editor of rāhnamāye ketāb (Bibliography Guide), Mehr, farhang-e Iranzamin (Culture of Iran) and Ayandeh.

He was the chief bibliographer of Persian books at Harvard University. Afshar was associated with UNESCO and taught at the University of Bern and University of Tehran.

He was on the advisory council for the Iranian Studies journal.

== See also ==
- Iranology
- Encyclopædia Iranica
- Dastur al-Muluk
- Ehsan Yarshater
- Alireza Feyz
- Mehdi Bayani
