= Mahmoud Khatami =

Muslim philosopher

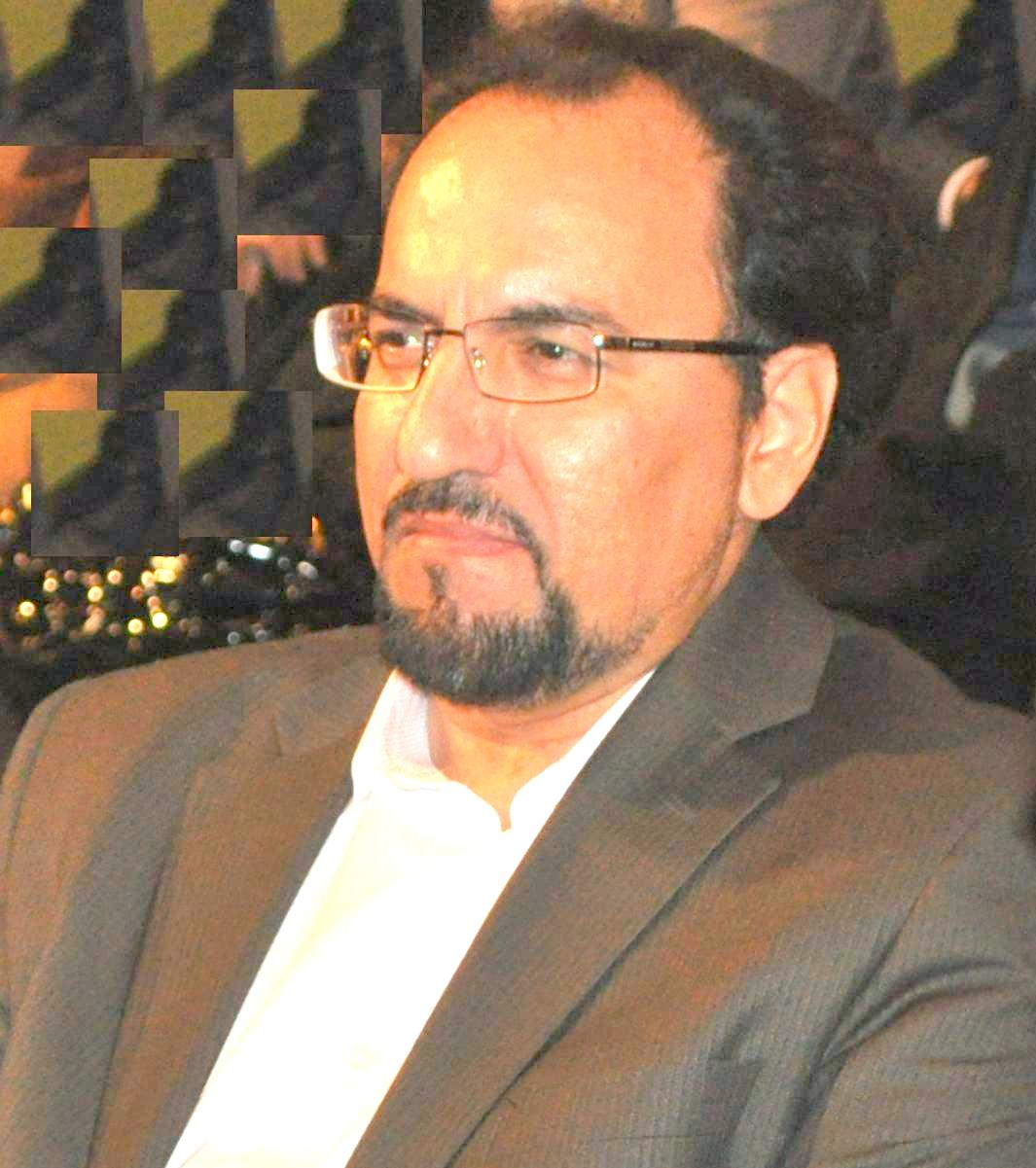
- Born: Tehran, Iran

Philosophical work
- Era: 21st-century philosophy
- Main interests: Metaphysics · Axiology
- Notable ideas: Ontetic philosophy

Mahmoud Khatami (Persian: محمود خاتمی; born 1962 or 1963) is an Iranian philosopher.

== Life ==
Mahmoud Khatami grew up in Tehran. Showing an early interest in humanities, he attended the Seminary of Islamic Studies, which gained him the traditional degree of Ijtihad, the highest level in Islamic religious and theological learning. Concurrently, he attended the University of Tehran to pursue his secular education for the BA, MA and MS degrees. He also received two PhD degrees in philosophy from Iranian institutions, one in 1987 and one in 1992. Afterwards, he furthered his education in England, where he was awarded a further PhD in the field of Philosophical Psychology at the University of Durham in 1996.

Returning to Iran, he was appointed to the Department of Philosophy at University of Tehran in 1997 where he is now a Professor of Contemporary Philosophy. In 2002, he was made a Fellow of Iran's Academy of the Arts. He has served as a visiting professor at other Iranian and Western universities, and has received awards for his academic excellence both inside and outside Iran.

In 2014, he was accused of plagiarism. The journal Topoi retracted one of his articles and the journal editor discussed Khatami's plagiarism in an editorial.

== See also ==
- Martin Heidegger
- Mulla Sadra
- Immanuel Kant
- Islamic philosophy
- Iranian Philosophy
