= Hamid Aboutalebi =

Former Iranian diplomat and ambassador (born 1957)

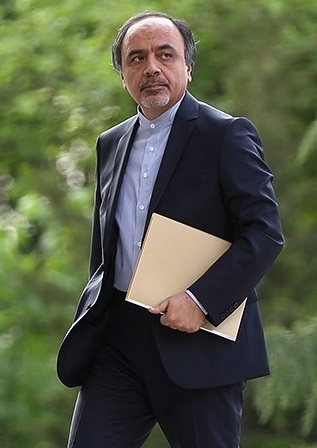

Political Advisor to the President of Iran
- In office 13 November 2017 – June 2020
- President: Hassan Rouhani

Deputy Chief of Staff for Political Affairs of the President of Iran
- In office 7 October 2013 – 13 November 2017
- President: Hassan Rouhani
- Succeeded by: Majid Takht-Ravanchi

Ambassador of Iran to Australia
- In office 2003–2006
- President: Mohammad Khatami; Mahmoud Ahmadinejad
- Preceded by: Gholamali Khoshroo
- Succeeded by: Mahmoud Movahhedi

Ambassador of Iran to Belgium and the European Union
- In office 1995–2000
- President: Akbar Hashemi Rafsanjani; Mohammad Khatami
- Preceded by: Mohammad Reza Bakhtiari
- Succeeded by: Abolghassem Delfi

Ambassador of Iran to Italy
- In office 1988–1992
- President: Ali Khamenei; Akbar Hashemi Rafsanjani
- Preceded by: Gholamali Heydari Khajepour
- Succeeded by: Majid Hedayatzade

Personal details
- Born: 16 June 1957 (age 69) Tehran, Iran
- Education: University of Tehran; Sorbonne Nouvelle University; Katholieke Universiteit Leuven

Hamid Aboutalebi (Persian: حمید ابوطالبی, born 16 June 1957) is a former Iranian diplomat and ambassador. Aboutalebi was previously ambassador of Iran to Australia, the European Union, Belgium, Italy, and a political director general to Iran's Ministry of Foreign Affairs. He was part of Iran's UN delegation in New York City in the 1990s.

== Early life and education ==
Hamid Aboutalebi was born on 16 June 1957 in Tehran, Iran. He earned a bachelor's degree in sociology from Tehran University in 1980. He then completed master's degrees in the history of Islamic civilization and culture at Tehran University in 1994 and in sociology from Sorbonne Nouvelle University in Paris in 1985 before obtaining his Ph.D. in historical sociology from Katholieke Universiteit Leuven in 1999.

== Diplomatic and public service career ==
Aboutalebi served in a number of prominent diplomatic and political roles for the Islamic Republic of Iran before his retirement. He served as the head of the Third Political Bureau at the Ministry of Foreign Affairs, where he oversaw relations with Western Europe. He was later appointed as Iran’s ambassador to Italy from 1988 to 1992, concurrently accredited to Malta and Albania. During this period, he was also a member of the Iranian delegation negotiating United Nations Security Council Resolution 598, which ended the Iran–Iraq War. After returning from Rome in 1992, he was appointed advisor to the minister of foreign affairs. In 1995, he became Iran’s ambassador to Belgium and the European Union. Upon his return to Tehran in 2000, he was named director general for political affairs at the Ministry of Foreign Affairs during the reformist government. In 2003, he was appointed ambassador to Australia, a post he held until 2006.

In addition to his diplomatic career, Hamid Aboutalebi held important political roles within the Iranian government. He was appointed deputy chief of staff for political affairs to President Hassan Rouhani in October 2013, a position he held until November 2017. He then served as the president’s political advisor until his resignation in June 2020.

During his years in office, Aboutalebi played a central role in shaping Iran’s foreign policy messaging and internal political discourse. His writings and public commentary consistently reflected a reformist and pragmatic stance, advocating for political pluralism, international engagement, and negotiated solutions. He was a key advisor to President Rouhani on strategic approaches to diplomacy, particularly during the negotiations that led to the Joint Comprehensive Plan of Action (JCPOA) between Iran and world powers in 2015.

In public discourse surrounding his resignation, it has been speculated that Aboutalebi stepped down due to disagreements over the growing influence of military institutions in shaping both foreign and domestic policy. Observers have linked his departure to his consistent advocacy for a diplomacy-first approach in foreign affairs. This interpretation is supported by a series of tweets from June 2020 on his official Twitter account, in which he emphasized the importance of negotiation and political engagement as foundational principles of Iran’s foreign policy. He formally retired from public service in March 2022.

== Views and commentary ==
=== Domestic policy ===
Aboutalebi has consistently expressed support for political pluralism and democratic reform within Iran. In his public commentary, he has emphasized the need for governance that reflects the diverse voices within Iranian society, arguing that political representation must extend beyond dominant factions. He has called for the institutionalization of political participation and the re-integration of marginalized groups into the public sphere, cautioning that narrowing the space for dissent undermines the legitimacy of the political system. He views the Iranian polity as inherently pluralistic and has argued that efforts to marginalize certain constituencies ultimately weaken national cohesion and governance capacity.

=== Iran–United States relations ===
Aboutalebi is a long-standing advocate of diplomatic engagement between Iran and the United States and has publicly supported normalization of relations between the two countries. In a 2025 statement, he described a shift in political and social conditions that, in his view, made direct negotiation both necessary and feasible. He argued that bilateral talks—prompted by written exchanges between the leaders of Iran and the United States—marked the beginning of a new phase in Iran–U.S. relations. He identified four driving forces behind this shift: widespread public support within Iran for ending the U.S.–Iran crisis, political will on both sides to pursue diplomacy, institutional support within both countries for resolving tensions through dialogue, and increased pressure from civil society.

Aboutalebi outlined a phased negotiation framework, prioritizing: (a) the full suspension of sanctions and the reestablishment of economic ties; (b) normalization of political relations as a foundation for rebuilding trust; and (c) the deferral of more contentious issues until after diplomatic relations had been restored. As a confidence-building measure, he proposed a voluntary freeze of both all U.S. sanctions and Iran’s nuclear program under International Atomic Energy Agency (IAEA) supervision. He also emphasized the importance of public transparency, urging Iranian officials to engage citizens in the diplomatic process and avoid treating the public as uninformed outsiders. In his view, diplomacy between the two nations should not only be shaped by state actors but also openly deliberated within Iran’s political and intellectual community.

== Publications ==
=== Academic works in philosophy and sociology ===
Hamid Aboutalebi is the author of a multi-volume series titled "Social Philosophy of Morality", which explores the philosophical and sociological dimensions of moral systems from an anthropological and sociological perspective:

- Volume I: Anthropology of Ethics (2013) This inaugural volume introduces the foundational concepts of social ethics, examining the interplay between individual morality and societal norms. It delves into how ethical frameworks are constructed and maintained within cultural and social - religious settings.
- Volume II: God of the Gods of Morality (2025) The second installment expands on the themes of the first, offering a deeper analysis of the metaphysical religious underpinnings of moral thought. It discusses the authoritative role of divine authority in shaping moral principles and the implications for contemporary ethical discourses.

=== Professional writings in foreign affairs and diplomacy ===
In addition to his academic pursuits, Aboutalebi has authored several works addressing international relations and foreign policy, with a focus on Iran's interactions with global powers:

- Basic Challenges of U.S Foreign Policy towards Iran (2009),
- Rocky Mountains of Nuclear Extremism (2009),
- Turkey: Modern Diplomacy and New Ottoman Caliphate (2009),
- New Challenges of Iran Foreign Policy towards the U.S. (2010).

== Controversy ==
It has been claimed that Aboutalebi was one of the student radicals involved in the Iran hostage crisis, in which 52 Americans, including diplomats from the US embassy in Tehran, were held captive from 1979 to 1980.

Aboutalebi denied participation in the takeover of the US embassy, emphasising that he was brought in to translate and negotiate following the occupation. Aboutalebi was a student and member of the Muslim Student Followers of the Imam's Line, comprising students from several major science and technology universities of Tehran, which occupied the U.S. embassy in Tehran. Ebrahim Asgharzadeh, a leading member of the core group who organized and led the embassy takeover, told BBC Persian that Aboutalebi's involvement was peripheral. "Calling him a hostage-taker is simply wrong", Asgharzadeh said.

Due to the claims, Aboutalebi's appointment as ambassador to the UN was opposed by numerous U.S. lawmakers and diplomats, some of whom asked the US Department of State to deny his application for a visa.

On 1 April 2014, in the United States Senate, Republican senator Ted Cruz introduced Senate bill 2195, a bill that would allow the president of the United States to deny a visa to any ambassador to the United Nations who has been alleged to have been engaged in espionage activities or a terrorist activity against the United States or its allies, and may pose a threat to U.S. national security interests. The bill was a reaction to Aboutalebi's selection as Iran's ambassador. The bill passed the Senate on 7 April, and the United States House of Representatives on 10 April. Originally S. 2195, the bill was signed into law on 16 April 2014 by President Barack Obama.

Complicating the situation were the ongoing nuclear negotiations between the United States and Iran. Some have argued that denying Abutalebi's entry to the United States would violate the 1947 treaty agreement which was a prerequisite for the United Nations' agreement to locate their headquarters in New York City. The United States government never denied a visa for Aboutalebi. According to the New York Times: "By not explicitly rejecting the visa application, the White House appeared to be leaving Iran a way to resolve the standoff".
