= Jalal Jalalizadeh =

Iranian politician (born 1960)

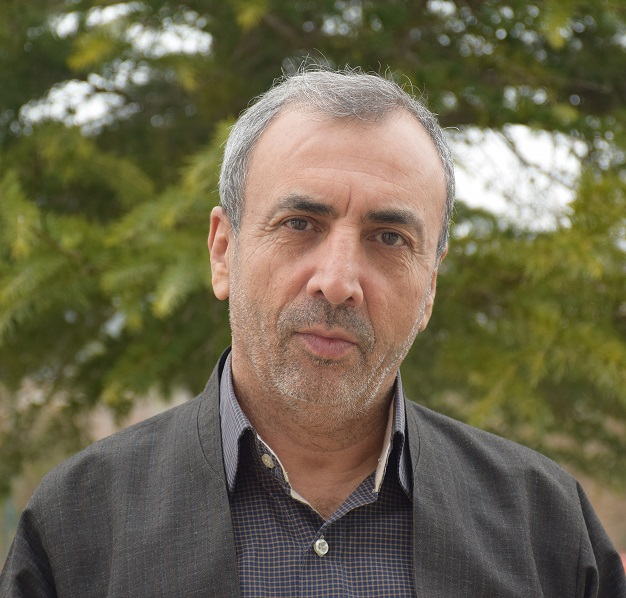

Member of the Parliament of Iran
- In office 26 May 2000 – 23 February 2004
- Constituency: Sanandaj, Divandarreh and Kamyaran
- Majority: 83,236 (39%)

Personal details
- Born: 24 June 1960 (age 66) Sanandaj, Iran
- Party: Islamic Iran Participation Front, Union of Islamic Iran People Party

Jalal Jalalizadeh (born 24 June 1960) is an Iranian Sunni Kurdish politician, University of Tehran professor, and political activist.

Jalalizadeh was advisor to Iran's interior minister and also a representative of Sanandaj in Iran's 6th parliament. He is now a member of Islamic Iran Participation Front (IIPF). In 2008 Jalalizadeh was sentenced to a year in prison after being charged with "propaganda against the state".

== Works ==
=== Compilations and translations into Persian ===
- "History of Jurisprudence and Jurists"
- "Kurds are descendants of the Medes"
- "The Last Journey (True Tragedy of a Kurdish Family)"
- "Talk Always"
- "The Exalted Passage"
- "Mirror of Sentences in Shafi'i Jurisprudence"
- "A Revolution in the Prophetic Tradition"
- "The Role of Marriage in Community Health"
- "History of the Principles of Jurisprudence"
- "Luminous Words"
- "Do we deserve democracy?"
- "Explanation of Problems"
- "Principles of Jurisprudence"
