= Faculty of Letters and Humanities of the University of Tehran =

Faculty of Letters and Humanities of the University of Tehran is one of the earliest six faculties of the University of Tehran dating from 1935 when the university was founded. Since 1958 it has moved to the modern building on the main campus of the university.

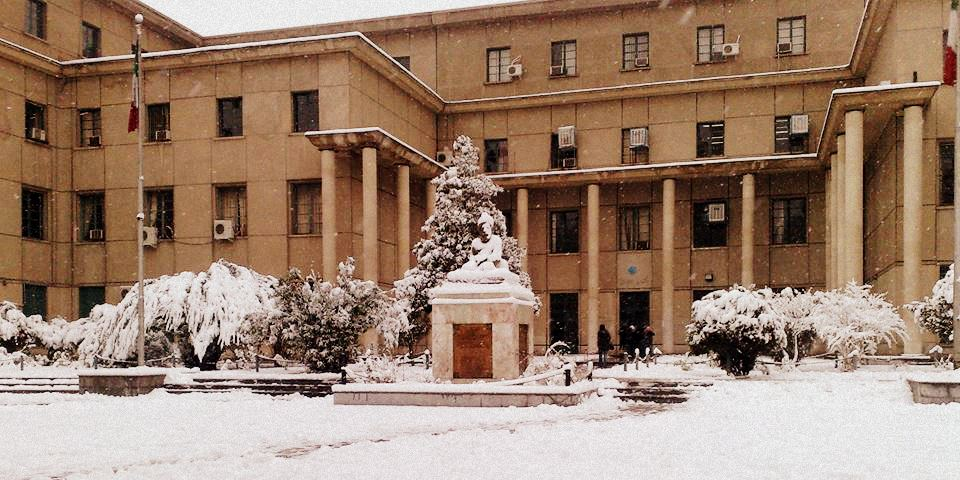
Faculty of Letters and Humanities in winter
