= Mehrdad Avesta =

Iranian poet 1930-1991

Mehrdad Avesta مهرداد اوستا
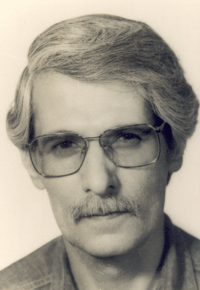
- مهرداد اوستا
- Born: Mohammad Reza Rahmani; 8 August 1930; Borujerd, Imperial State of Iran
- Died: 6 May 1991 (aged 60); Tehran, Iran
- Other names: Mohammad Reza Rahmani
- Occupation: Scholar
- Known for: Scholar of Persian literature, poetry.

Mehrdad Avesta (Mohammad Reza Rahmani, Persian: مهرداد اوستا; 8 August 1930 – 6 May 1991) was an Iranian poet.

He was born in Borujerd (on 8 August 1930) into a literature and art-oriented family. When he was young, he changed his first name from Mohammad Reza to Mehrdad and his family name from Rahmani to Avesta in order to show his passion for ancient Persian culture.

Avesta entered the University of Tehran in 1948 and finished his academic studies in same university with a M.A. degree in Philosophy. When he was 25 years old, he started teaching literature, philosophy and history of arts at the University of Tehran.

He married two times in 1954 and 1966 and he had one son and three daughters. Avesta died in his office at Vahdat Hall of Tehran while he was editing a poem work.

== Life ==
Mehrdad Avesta was born in 1929, in Borujerd. Born to a family of artistic history, he was also greatly interested in art, so he started writing poems from early ages, which were also published. He got his degree in Theology, and then studied philosophy. Along his formal education, he started working as a teacher. Besides, he served in prison for 7 years as a political prisoner, because of his poems against the Pahlavi Regime. He got married twice, in 1953 and 1965, and had a son and 3 daughters. He received some practices under supervision of Mone, Russel, Sartre, and Jamalzadeh. He toured around the world, visiting different countries and different people, giving speeches and receiving education in philosophy and theosophy. He had worked as a poetry judge in Music part of Ministry of Culture with Ahmad NikTalab and other famous Persian poets in Vahdat Hall of Tehran.

He died at the age of 62 because of heart attack, and is buried in Behesht-e Zahra in the Artists section.

== Notable teachers ==
- Badiozzaman Forouzanfar
- Sebastian Mone

== Bibliography ==
- 1951 – Dvian-e Salman-e Saveji
- 1955 – Aghl-o Eshraq
- 1956 – Resalat-e Khayyam
- 1960 – Az Karevan-e Rafteh
- 1963 – Palizban
- 1965 – Hamase-ye Arash
- 1965 – Az Emrooz Ta Harggez
- 1969 – Ashk-o Sarnevesht
- 1969 – Ravesh Tahghigh dar Dastoor-e Zaban-e Farsi
- 1972 – Sharab-e Khanegi Tars-e Mohtaseb Khordeh
- 1973 – Tirana
- 1981 – Emam, Hamsei Digar

== See also ==
- Persian literature
