= Abbas Zaryab =

Iranian writer and translator (1919–1995)

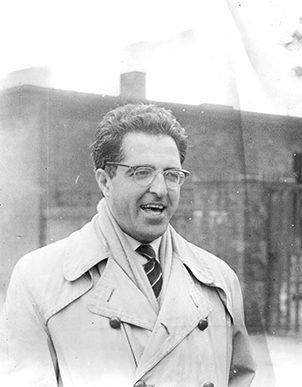
- Born: Abbas Khoyi; August 13, 1919; Khoy, Iran
- Died: February 3, 1995 (aged 75); Tehran, Iran
- Education: University of Tehran, Johannes Gutenberg-Universität Mainz
- Occupations: littérateur, historian, translator
- Writing career
- Language: Persian, German, English

Abbas Zaryab or 'Abbās Zaryāb (Persian: عباس زریاب; full name: Abbas (Zaryab) Khoyi عباس (زریاب) خویی; August 13, 1919 – February 3, 1995) was a historian, translator, literature Professor and Iranologist. He was the author of several books, including a life of Muhammad, and articles in The Persian Encyclopedia (published in Iran), Western peer reviewed Journals as well as Iranica.

== Biography ==
Abbas was born in Khoy, West Azerbaijan in Iran. From an early age, he showed an exceptional talent and memory, becoming distinguished among his classmates. Through a distinguished academic achievement, he was given a free scholarship to Germany. He obtained his doctorate from Mainz University in Germany from the history department. His Ph.D. thesis covered the topic of Timur's successor according to the book: Tarikh-e-Kabir Ja'fari. He had mastery over the Persian language, Azerbaijani language, Arabic language and European languages such as German, English and French.

Among the distinguished rank he held, was the head of the library of congress in Iran and the head of the literature department at Tehran University. At the invitation of the eminent Iranologist, Professor Walter Bruno Henning, he taught Near Eastern languages and Persian language and literature in University of California, Berkeley between 1962 and 1964. But he came back to Iran, due to his love for his homeland and took a position at Tehran University. He died in 1995.

His works are quoted in Western publications and by Western scholars including Franklin Lewis, Charles Melville, G. Michael Wickens, Juan Cole, Kamran Ekbal, Lutz Richter-Bernburg, Josef van Ess, H. R. Roemer, etc.

== Books and articles ==
=== Non-Persian languages ===
Some selected writing of his in non-Persian languages.

- 'A. Zaryāb, ĀḠĀJĪ BOḴĀRĪ in Encyclopædia Iranica
- 'A. Zaryab ĀḠĀJĪ, in Encyclopædia Iranica
- 'A. Zaryab BOKAYR B. MĀHĀN in Encyclopædia Iranica
- Charles Melville and 'A. Zaryab Chobanids in Encyclopædia Iranica
- 'A. Zaryab EDUCATION v. THE MADRASA IN SHI'ITE PERSIA in Encyclopædia Iranica
- 'A. Zaryab IRAQ ii iii. FROM THE MONGOLS TO THE SAFAVIDS in Encyclopædia Iranica
- "Bukayr B. Maham Marvazi", Encyclopædia Iranica, vol. IV, London 1990, p. 332.
- Zaryāb Ḵo'ī, "Ebn-e Rāvandī" in DMBE III, pp. 531–39
- 'A. Zaryab, Der Bericht über die Nachfolger Timurs aus dem Ta'rīḫ-i kabīr des Ğa'farī ibn Muḥammad al-Ḥusainī, Ph.D. thesis, Mainz, 1960.
- 'A. Zaryab,. Fakhr Razi und die Frage des Seins. Spektrum Iran. Bonn. 1988 1/3: 14–24.
- "Ein Wiederaufgefundnes Werk Abu Hayyan al-Tanhidis", A Lpccust's Leg, London 1962, pp. 246–250.
- 'A. Zaryab, "Struggle of Religious sects in the Ilkhanid Court" La Persianel Medioevo, Roma, Accademia Nazionale dei Lincei, 1971, pp. 465–466.

=== Persian ===
Zaryab Khoi had over 100+ publications in Persian.
