= Tariq ut-tahqiq =

1133 poetry book attributed to Sanai

Tariq ut-tahqiq or Tariq at-tahqiqis is one of the books attributed to Sanai. It is an Early New Persian mystical poetry book from 1133 AD in mathnawi form. This book was published in Persian by Mohammad Taghi Modarres Razavi as Masnavi of Sanai in 1969 with association of the University of Tehran Press.

== Sample poem ==
For example, a poem called Litany from this book translated to english as follows:

ای برآرندهٔ مه و خورشید

Translation:

O Lord of the fog and the sun

نقش‌بند جهان بیم و امید

Translation:

The ruler of the world of fear and hope

ای به تو زنده جان، چو جسم به جان

Translation:

O to you live of soul, like body to soul

جسم و جان را ز لطف توست توان

Translation:

Body and soul can be strengthened by your grace

روح را هر نفس ز تو مددست

Translation:

The soul get your help in every breath

کرم و رحمت تو بی‌عددست

Translation:

Your mercy and grant are innumerable

ای بسا مسجدی که راندهٔ توست

Translation:

Oh, maybe the mosque man you rejected

وی بسا بت پرست خواندهٔ توست

Translation:

Oh, you may waiting for a pagan

همه فانی شویم و تو باقی

Translation:

We are all perish and you remain

همه مست توایم و تو ساقی

Translation:

We are all drunk and you are the cupbearer

غرض ما ز هرچه هست توئی

Translation:

Our purpose is whatever finally is you

کارساز بلند و پست توئی

Translation:

You take peoples up and down

طمع ما ز تو، عنایت توست

Translation:

Our greed for getting you, also is your grace

رهبر ما به تو، هدایت توست

Translation:

Our leader to you, is your guidance

== See also ==
- Hadiqat al Haqiqa
- Seir al-Ebad elal-Ma'ad
- Karnameye Balkh
- Karname-ye Ardeshir-e Babakan
- Matigan-i Hazar Datistan
- Sheikh San'Aan
