= Karname-ye Balkh =

Karname-ye Balkh or Karnameye Balkh (Persian: کارنامه بلخ, lit. 'workbook of Balkh') is one of the works of Sanai and it contain his poems which he composed when he stopped in the city of Balkh. It contains about 500 verses and because it was written through some jokes, it has also been called the Humor letter (Motāyebe-Nāme).

In this work, the poet deals with some aspects of his life and his father and some of his contemporaries. This work has been corrected and published by Mohammad Taghi Modarres Razavi in Persian.

== See also ==
- Hadiqat al Haqiqa
- Seir al-Ebad elal-Ma'ad
- Tariq ut-tahqiq
- Karname-ye Ardeshir-e Babakan
- Matigan-i Hazar Datistan
- Sheikh Sn'Aan
