= Christianity in the Sasanian Empire =

Brief history of Christianity in the Sasanian Empire (Iraq and Iran modern territory)

Christianity was a religious minority in the Persian Sasanian Empire, roughly the region of modern-day Iraq and Iran from 224 to 651 CE. Christianity had been introduced into the Persian world earlier, in the second century during the Parthian period (before the Sasanians), likely spreading into Iran through the eastern border of the Roman Empire. Beyond this, little else is known about the origins and early history of Persian Christianity. In the Sasanian world, Christianity was often persecuted in the context of its tensions with Zoroastrianism, which had become the state religion of the Sasanian Empire in the third century, and sometimes in fear that Christians would collude with their main political rival, the Roman Empire, whose conversion to Christianity began with the reign of Constantine the Great in the early fourth century. The most intense persecution is believed to have occurred in the reign of Shapur II, with accounts describing the deaths of up to 16,000 Christians. Persecutions continued to take place over the centuries, in the reigns of Shapur II, Yazdegerd I, Bahram V, Yazdegerd II, and others, which came to be popularly expressed in Christian memory through the Persian martyr acts, or narrative accounts of the martyrs of Christian men and women who confessed their faith or converted to Christianity from Zoroastrianism in the face of death. At the same time, beginning in the fifth century, a growing trend of normalization took place between Christians and the empire.

Despite the periods of persecution, Christianity grew throughout the Sasanian world and bishoprics formed in all major cities under the ecclesiastical organization of the Church of the East. By recognizing the Eastern churches' full independence (institutionally and hierarchically) from the churches in the Roman world, some Persian rulers sought to foster a local Christianity free from the influence of their Roman rivals. Relatedly, Christianity in the Sasanian Empire diverged from Chalcedonian Christianity, often being expressed through Nestorian and Miaphysite doctrines. The only region whose Christians were predominantly Chalcedonian was Iberia.

There is a wide range of opinions regarding the extent to which different religions in the Sasanian Empire coexisted harmoniously. The prevailing view today is that persecutions of Christians were more the exception than the rule and that they occurred for political reasons, both external and internal.

== Period ==
=== Parthian period ===
Parthia and adjacent territories

The era in the Iranian history between the Avestan and Sasanian periods, when from the late 4th century BCE to the early 3rd century CE was characterized by religious diversity. During this time, Iran was under the rule of the Parthian Arsacid dynasty. The traditional Zoroastrian tradition began to fade, giving way to the worship of various spirit-daevas. During this time, Jewish and Christian communities also emerged in Iran. Ruled by a junior branch of the Arsacids, Armenia by 190 BCE was a conglomerate of 120 principalities governed by nakharars, some of which adhered to Persian cults, while others followed Hellenistic practices. According to James R. Russell, the subsequent Artaxiad dynasty (189 BCE – 12 CE) supported Zoroastrianism. Generally, the prevailing view is that the state adhered to principles of religious tolerance or was indifferent to dogmatic issues during the Arsacid period.

The moment of the Christians in Mesopotamia appearance is unknown and remains a subject of debate. French archaeologist Jean Maurice Fiey (1967) dates the event to the late 1st century, while American historian W. S. McCullough (1982) suggests it occurred a century later. According to the renowned Syriac researcher Sebastian Brock, Christian communities, isolated from the church of the Roman Empire, could have existed in Mesopotamia from the 2nd century. The desire to attribute antiquity to their church led, for example, to the late 8th-century Nestorian patriarch Timothy I claiming that "Christianity among us was founded approximately 500 before Nestorius and twenty years after the ascension of our Savior". Most likely, Christianity reached Persian territory via trade routes from Edessa, appearing first in Nisibis, Arbil, and Veh-Ardashir.

The spread of Christianity from Edessa further east is mentioned in the Acts of Mar Mari, dated tentatively to the early 7th century. The task of the authors of the Acts, living in the 6th to early 7th centuries, was to substantiate the antiquity of the Church of the East in the territory of modern Iraq and the authority of its catholicoses, whose residence was in the Sasanian capital Veh-Ardashir, also known as Kokhe and Seleucia-Ctesiphon. According to the Acts, from Edessa, Mari traveled toward Nisibis, then through Adiabene south to Babylonia. Upon reaching Kokhe, he founded the first church there.

After converting Babylonia to Christianity, Mari proceeded to Persia, starting with Beth-Huzaye and Elam in southwestern modern Iran. The Acts claim that through countless miracles, Mari established a widespread church hierarchy in Persia, with numerous priests, deacons, schools, teachers, and hospitals. Most likely, the Christian centers described in this apocryphal text were established closer to the time of the document's composition than to apostolic times.

Another source, the 6th-century Syriac Chronicle of Arbela, names Mar Pkidha as the first bishop of Adiabene. According to the chronicle, by the time of the fall of the Parthian Empire, there were 20 Christian bishops in Mesopotamia. Church tradition links the emergence of Christian communities in the East with the activities of the apostles Peter, considered the first patriarch of the Eastern church, and Thomas, as well as the apostle of the Seventy Thaddeus (Addai) and his disciple, the apostle of Mesopotamia Mari, through whose efforts the church became known as the "church of Mar Mari".

An idealized version of the history of Christianity's emergence in the capital of Osroene, Edessa, is presented in the Doctrine of Addai, dated to the first half of the 5th century. The correspondence between King Abgar and Jesus Christ cited there has led some researchers to consider Osroene the first country to adopt Christianity. There are also grounds to suggest Antioch or Palestine as sources of Christianity in Edessa. In modern historiography, the earliest Christian communities in Parthia are identified among Jews who had lived there since the Babylonian captivity. According to one hypothesis, Christianity spread eastward with trade caravans, with Jews controlling the routes through the Persian Gulf to Central Asia and China.

Although information about beliefs in early Christian Osroene is limited, sources suggest the presence in Edessa of various religious groups, including Jews, adherents of traditional forms of Greco-Roman and Aramaic polytheism, and Manichaeism. Religious diversity in Edessa was facilitated by its geographic location at the border of the major empires of the ancient world and at the crossroads of trade routes. German historian Walter Bauer describes Christianity in Edessa as "heretical" and consistently distant from orthodoxy. Zoroastrian Parthians showed no hostility toward the Christian and Jewish minorities, in contrast to the Roman Empire, where Christians faced systematic persecution. Due to the absence or minimal presence of persecution, the cult of martyrdom spread in the East only in the 4th century.

=== Early Sasanian period ===
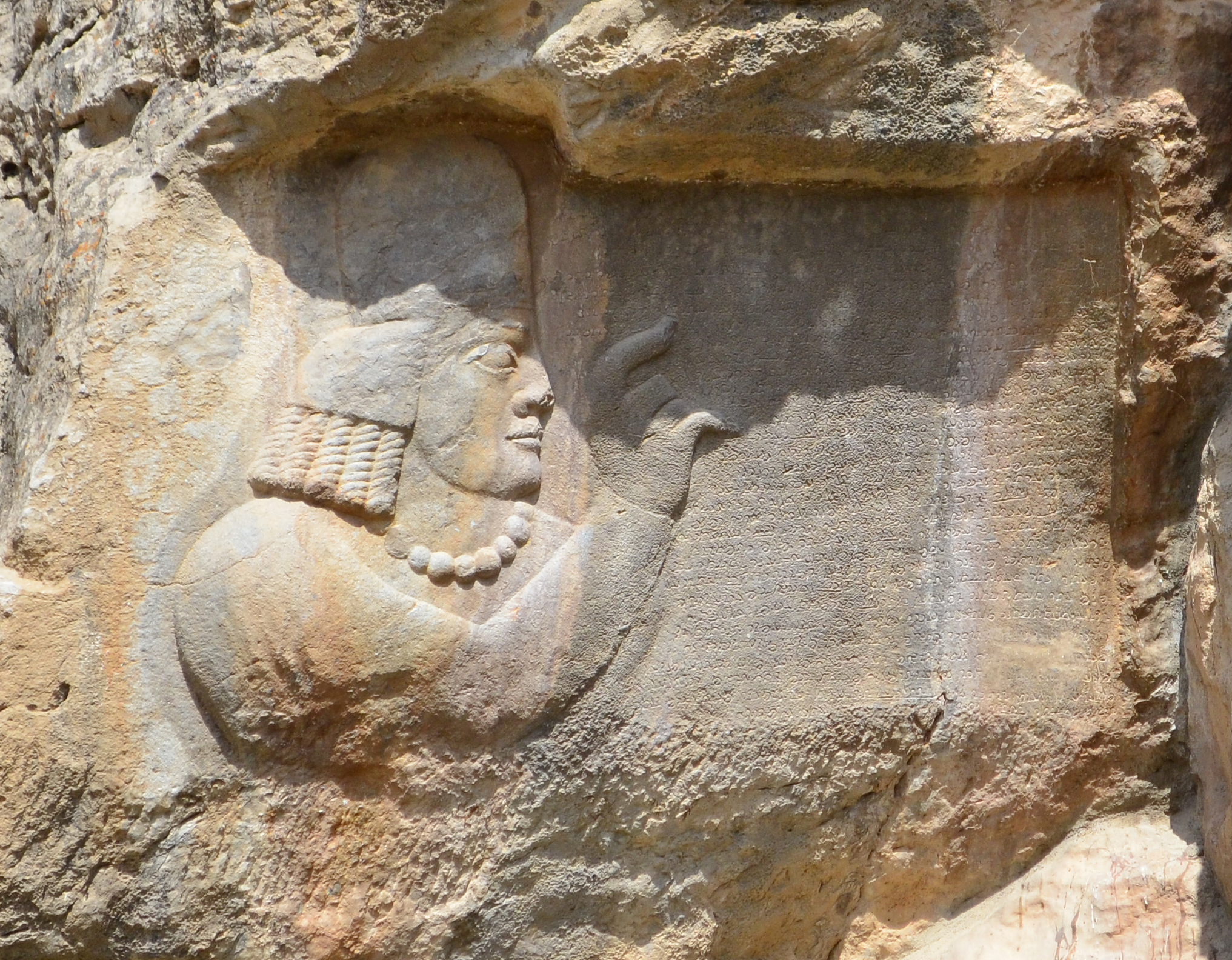
Kartir's inscription at Naqsh-e Rajab

In 224 CE, Ardashir I (224–241), the founder of the Sasanian dynasty, came to power in Iran. According to available information, his family had close ties with the Zoroastrian clergy. The 6th-century pseudepigraph Letter of Tansar justifies the legitimacy of the dynasty's rise to power through its religious zeal, positioning Ardashir as the true heir of the ancient Achaemenids. (Note: Not all researchers, particularly I. M. Diakonov, recognize the Achaemenids as consistent Zoroastrians.) The anonymous author criticizes the apostate Arsacids and their policy of religious tolerance. Under the early Sasanians, the clergy (mobeds), led by the magupat (chief of the magi) or, later, the mobedan-mobed, assumed a prominent position in society.

During the reign of Shahanshah Bahram II (276–293) and the active efforts of the Zoroastrian priest Kartir, Zoroastrianism became the state religion for the first time in Iranian history. Kartir's inscriptions and his threats against non-believers are the subject of numerous studies attempting to determine the extent of religious intolerance among Zoroastrian mobeds. Despite the threatening rhetoric, there is no confirmation in Christian, Jewish, or Mandaean sources that persecutions took place. The only exception is Manichaeism, whose prophet Mani was executed under Kartir. According to British Iranologist Mary Boyce, the Sasanian period alternated between phases of religious tolerance and intolerance, with Kartir's activities falling into the latter category. Soviet Orientalist Elena Doroshchenko considers intolerance a defining feature of Sasanian Zoroastrianism. Several later researchers have criticized this binary opposition as oversimplified. They have found evidence in late Sasanian texts of more nuanced interactions between state Zoroastrianism and religious minorities in the early period. It has also been suggested that relations between the state and mobeds were significantly more antagonistic than depicted in Zoroastrian sources.

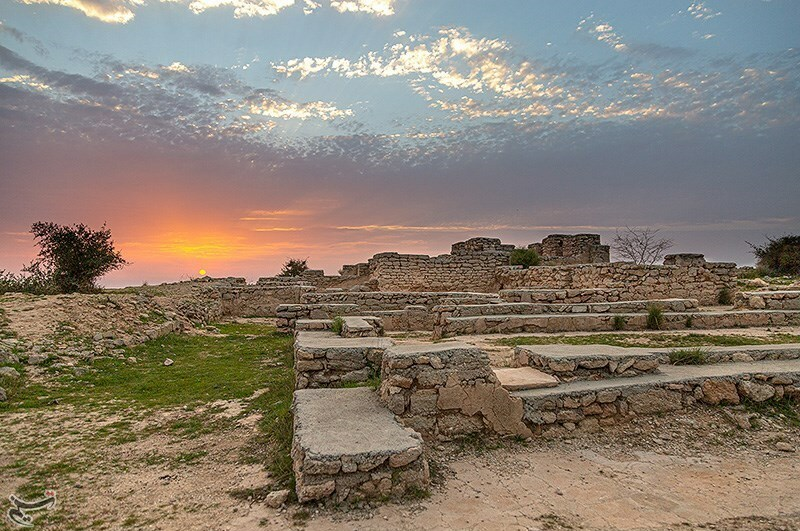
The oldest Christian ruins in Iran are located on the island of Kharg

Traditional historiography describes the relationship between Zoroastrianism and other religions in the Sasanian Empire using terms such as "state religion," "church," and "persecution." This view considers secular authorities' interference in citizens' spiritual lives as a form of persecution. However, Professor Adam Becker of New York University argues that this terminology is an anachronistic legacy of the liberal ideas of the European Enlightenment, employed due to a lack of better analogies.

In the Middle Persian language, all non-Zoroastrian religions were designated by the term agdēn ("infidels," see also agdēnīh – "bad religion"), considered synonymous with the term anēr, Aneran, non-Iran. In this ethnolinguistic concept, Christians also identified themselves as part of Aneran, which was preferable in legal terms to being considered apostate Zoroastrians. Jews and Manichaeans held the same position. Sources for studying Sasanian law include various collections of precedents, such as the Madigan-i Hazar Datistan.

Christian hagiographic literature can also serve as an additional source, though the accuracy of the legal procedures described therein is questionable. After Zoroastrianism was established as the state religion, the legal system became Zoroastrian in character and restricted the rights of religious minorities. Although Zoroastrian law applied to all subjects of the shah, a personal principle was also in effect, whereby each individual was subject to the law corresponding to their status. In trials against Christians, the prosecution was represented by mobeds.

In Sasanian culture, the purpose of punishment was to save the offender's soul from the consequences of their crime. The first, but not the only, condition for saving the sinner's soul from posthumous retribution was an honest and complete confession of sins. In the case of Christians, the state and religion were considered the injured parties in judicial proceedings, and the process was inquisitorial. The aim of measures applied to the accused, including arrest and torture, was to convince the heretic of the error of their beliefs and the truth of Zoroastrianism. Being born Christian was not considered apostasy. Christians were not prohibited from serving in the Sasanian army, where they could hold high positions. Nevertheless, sources indicate that the loyalty of Christians to the shah persisted until the 7th century.

It is difficult to estimate how many Christians were brought to Persia as a result of several large-scale deportations of residents of the Eastern Roman Empire in the 4th and 5th centuries. Given the religious policies of Emperor Valerian, it is unlikely that many Christians were among the soldiers captured by Shapur I (241–272) in 260 CE. According to the Chronicle of Seert, compiled between the 9th and 11th centuries and considered unreliable, Shapur deported many Christians from Antioch to Persia. These measures should not be regarded as anti-Christian but rather as part of strategic initiatives.

The Chronicle of Seert indicates that the captives formed an organized community with their own leaders, one of whom was the first bishop of Gondishapur, Demetrius of Antioch. The same source reports that the Christians were divided into two groups, Greek and Syrian, each with its own bishop. It is likely that the Iranians regarded them as representatives of different forms of Christianity. According to French religious scholar Jean de Menasce, the Christians in this context were Gnostic-Marcionites. While Valerian I persecuted Christians, Shapur I, on the contrary, treated them favorably. Later sources, including the Armenian Ełišē and the Syriac John of Ephesus, report an "edict of religious tolerance" under Shapur I.

By the mid-3rd century, the number of Christians in the country had become significant enough to be perceived as a threat. Indirect evidence of this can be found in the presence of quotations from the New Testament in Manichaean texts, as well as mentions of "Nazarenes" and "Christians" (Note: The exact meaning of these terms' distinction is a matter of debate.) in one of Kartir's inscriptions. The first persecutions of Christians occurred during the reign of Bahram I (273–276) or Bahram II (276–293), as documented in the 4th- or 5th-century account of the martyrdom of Candida. (Note: Approximately 60 martyrdoms from the Sasanian period have survived.) Likely from a family of captured soldiers of Valerian, Candida refused to become one of Bahram's wives, for which she was tortured and executed. The 5th-century Armenian "Martyrdom of the Voskyans" recounts possibly earlier events but is replete with anachronisms.

=== Late Sasanian period ===
In the reign of Khosrow II, the position of Christians in the empire became an increasingly prominent question. Some historians, such as Keenan Baca-Winters, argues that while Khosrow was a Zoroastrian ruler, he was unusually familiar and comfortable with Christian practices compared to his predecessors. This may have been related to Khosrow's Christians wives, such as one woman named Shirin, who allowed Christians to gain a high visibility at court. Khosrow also went on to patronize Christian shrines, send offerings to the shrine of Saint Sergius, and he occasionally intervened in the affairs of the Church of the East. A major example of this was his relations with Sabrisho I, whom he received ceremonially at the Sasanian royal court and who he promoted to the position of the catholicos. After the Sasanian conquest of Jerusalem in 614, the True Cross was brought to the Persian court and placed under the care of his wife Shirin. Rather than taking this as an act of anti-Christian desecration, some historians have opted to view this as Khosrow trying to manage the symbolic and political value of Christianity in the empire.

Khosrow’s policies also intensified divisions among Christian communities. The Sasanian expansion into Roman territory brought large numbers of Chalcedonian and Miaphysite Christians under Persian rule, while the older Church of the East remained an established Christian institution within Iran. Khosrow shifted patronage among rival churches as political circumstances required: he initially cultivated Chalcedonian connections after receiving Roman support from the Byzantine emperor Maurice, but later favored West Syrian Miaphysites in the newly conquered Roman territories and left the Church of the East without an official catholicos after 609. According to Baca-Winters, many hostile Christian portrayals of Khosrow arose from this unstable balance of patronage, the Church of the East's fear of losing influence, the execution of Zoroastrian converts to Christianity under Iranian law, and the enduring Christian memory of earlier Sasanian persecutions. Therefore, the period of his reign saw a balance between an enlarged integration of Christians into imperial politics, but also, the limits of tolerance of the Zoroastrian leadership, particularly during the time at which it was at war with the Christian Byzantine Empire.

== Persecution of Christians ==
Border regions of the Roman Empire and Iran

The Sasanian rulers' relations with religious minorities depended on a combination of external and internal political factors. These factors included the shahanshah's personal preferences, the state of relations with the Roman Empire, and the shahanshah's relationship with the Zoroastrian clergy. Each period of persecution had its own characteristics and underlying causes. Over time, the relationship between the Christian clergy and the state became more significant.

In the early 4th century, during the reign of Shah Hormizd II, the king of Armenia Tiridates III, (Note: As part of the Parthian Arsacid state, Armenia was the second most important kingdom after Iran. The Kaaba of Zoroaster inscription by Shapur I informs us about the conquest of Armenia and its inclusion in Eranshahr.) under the influence of Gregory the Illuminator, adopted Christianity. The adoption of Christianity divided the Armenian nobility, as a significant portion of the nakharars remained loyal to the ancient religion. The prevailing view in Armenian historiography that the adoption of Christianity marked a break with ancient paganism and barbarism and a choice in favor of cultural development is contested in modern Western historiography. In the Roman Empire, after his victory over Licinius in 324 CE, Emperor Constantine the Great made a definitive choice to support Christianity.

Church historian Eusebius of Caesarea reports that Constantine considered it his duty to convert pagans in neighboring countries to the true faith. He was also concerned about the fate of his co-religionists in Persia, who were under the rule of a Zoroastrian monarch. In his Life of Constantine, Eusebius cites a letter from the emperor to Shahanshah Shapur II (309–379), in which Constantine entrusted the lives and well-being of Christians to the Persian ruler. Historian Timothy David Barnes dates the letter to late 324 CE. If it is an authentic testament to Roman-Persian relations, it is believed to have shaped the fate of Persian Christians in the centuries that followed. In any case, Eusebius's works were translated into Syriac during the author's lifetime and were widely known in Persia.

The shift in religious policy in the Roman Empire, as well as Constantine's interference in the affairs of Armenia late in his life, cast doubt on the loyalty of Persian Christians. The dichotomy of loyalties was noted by the fifth-century Armenian theologian Yeznik of Kolb, who believed that everyone was either a servant of the King of Kings or the Roman emperor. According to modern historians, Shapur's concerns were justified, as in 337 CE, Constantine was prepared to launch a war against Persia to liberate Christians. It is also possible that the formation of the Zoroastrian clergy's structure and the codification of Zoroastrian "orthodoxy" were reactions to the changing religious policy in the West.

On the other hand, in 324 CE, the possibility of war was not yet apparent, and it was only the power struggle following the death of Armenian King Tiridates III in 330 CE that made war inevitable. Constantine's death in May of 337 CE did not halt preparations for war, which began that year or the next. Iranian historian Touraj Daryaee adds to the list of reasons for the persecution of Christians the universal nature of the Western religion and its proselytism.

The most important sources for the persecution of Christians under Shapur II are the works of the Syriac writer Aphrahat (d. 345) and the hagiography of Bishop Shimun I Bar Sabbae. In the late 440s, Sozomen recorded his version of events. According to him, the persecutions were instigated by the shah's wife, who was influenced by Jews. The overall outcome of these events is well known, though the exact sequence and chronology remain subjects of scholarly debate, including the date of Shimun's martyrdom. Additional complications arise from interpreting dates provided in sources according to the Seleucid calendar. After an unsuccessful siege of Nisibis, Shapur II issued a firman imposing additional taxes on Christians to finance the war with Rome.

The 5th-century Armenian historian Faustus of Byzantium explicitly states that the tax was intended to compel Christians to renounce their faith. Shapur then ordered the killing of all priests, the destruction of churches, and the confiscation of church property. Shimun refused to cooperate with the tax collection and was arrested as a traitor to the Persian state and an apostate from Zoroastrianism. A total of 128 individuals were killed. Scholars estimate Shimun's death occurred in 339, 340, 341, or 344 CE. Scholars date Shimun's death to 339, 340, 341, or 344 CE. The following year, a new decree initiated the execution of all Christians, though these did not last long. Although the total number of victims was significant—estimated by Sozomen at 16000 individuals—the persecution had no impact on the spread of Christianity in the country.

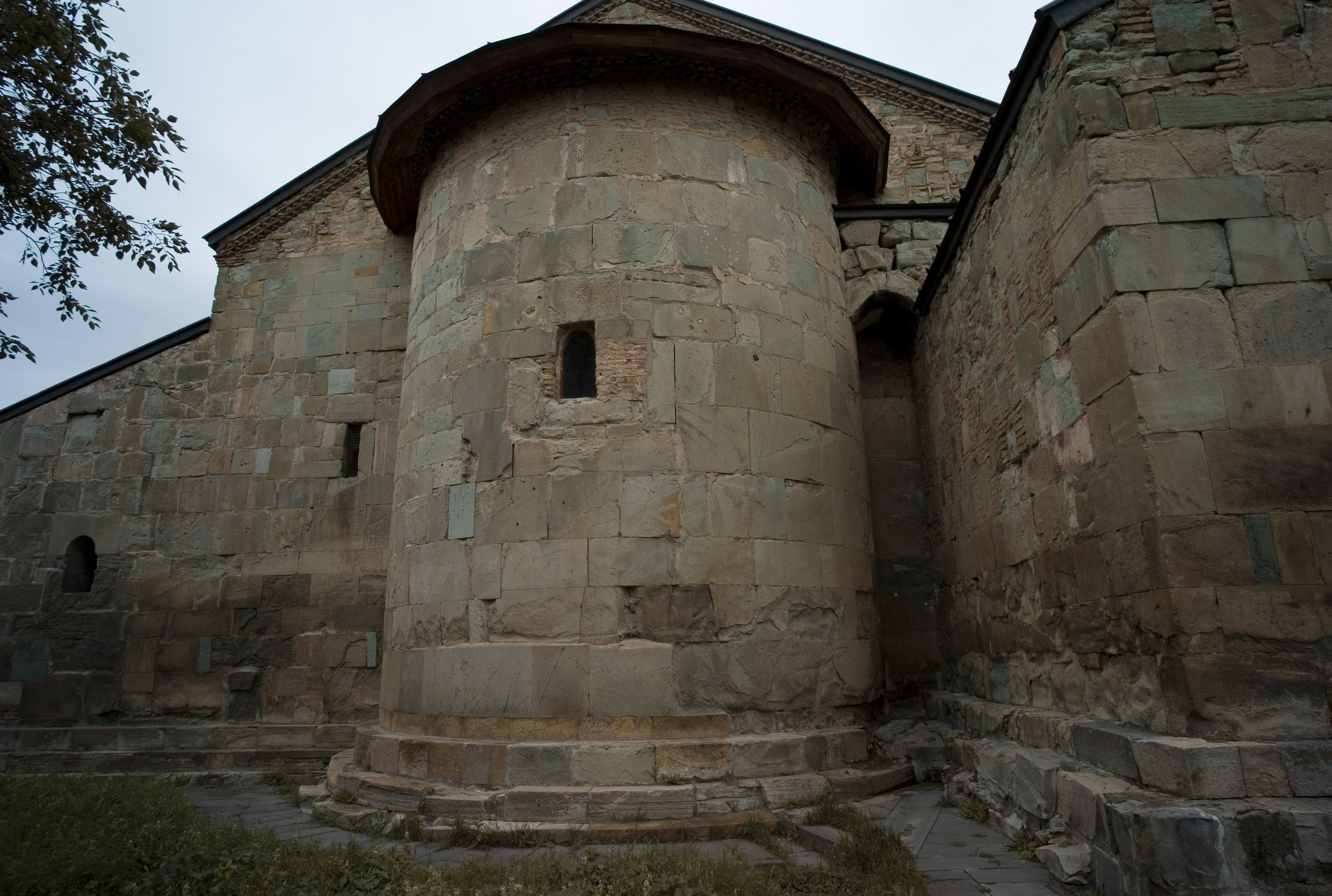
Basilica of Bolnisi Sioni, second half of the 5th century

The persecution under Shapur II marked a turning point in relations between Christian and Jewish communities. German Orientalist Gernot Wießner demonstrated that the account of Shimun's martyrdom exists in two versions, one of which blames the Jews for initiating the persecutions through slander against Christians. The contrast, not evident in Aphrahat's earlier works but clear in later ones, is explained by Adam Becker from New York University as resulting from Judaized Christians seeking refuge in synagogues during times of danger, necessitating a response to a religious distinction that was previously inconsequential.

Subsequently, Shapur II continued efforts to dismantle the church hierarchy and killed several bishops, including the catholicoses Shahdost (342) and Barba'shmin (346). After this, the title of catholicos remained vacant for nearly 20 years (346–363). In 363 CE, under the terms of a peace treaty, Nisibis was ceded to the Persians, prompting the renowned theologian Ephrem the Syrian and several teachers to leave the Nisibis School and relocate to Edessa, which was under Roman control. There, through his efforts, the Edessa School, founded in the time of the legendary Addai, was revived. The persecutions initiated by Shapur II were halted under his grandson Yazdegerd I (399–420). Christian sources preserve enthusiastic accounts of Yazdegerd as a "second Constantine", and the consequences for Persian Christians of the council held in Seleucia-Ctesiphon in 410 CE are considered comparable in significance to the Edict of Milan. After 410 CE, churches and monasteries began to appear in the country, becoming centers for the veneration of martyrs.

Following the partition of Greater Armenia between Byzantium and Persia in 387 CE, its larger eastern portion became part of Iran. Because of Armenia's strategic importance in the Sasanian Empire, Christians were significantly persecuted during major military campaigns in the Caucasus. It is unclear whether these persecutions were driven solely by military-strategic considerations or if the Sasanians hoped to return Armenians to the "true faith". Persecutions under Yazdegerd II (438–457) led to the Vardanants War in 450–451 CE. The events of that period, or those of the later Vahan War of 482–484 CE, are associated with the Martyrdom of the Atomyans and the Martyrdom of the Holy Queen Shushanik.

As noted by J. Russell, the nakharars Atom Gnuni and Manahir Rshtuni were executed not for their beliefs but for spreading Christianity in Ctesiphon. Scott McDonough, a historian from William Paterson University, points out that the ongoing Christianization of Armenia's military aristocracy posed a substantial threat to the Sasanian monarchy. The aristocracy's cavalry made a significant contribution to the Sasanian army, and the monarchy assumed a direct link between the worship of Ahura Mazda and Iran's victories. The Armenian Apostolic Church played a significant role in the liberation struggle. The armed struggle of 482–484 CE led to the cessation of religious persecutions of Armenians by the Persians and the proclamation of freedom of religion in Persian Armenia.

== Church Structures ==
=== Internal Organization of the Church Before 410 CE ===
Little information has been preserved about the ecclesiastical organization in Persia before the mid-4th century. It is likely that some episcopal structure existed in the East as early as the reign of Shapur I, but no details are known. Dioceses were disconnected, and boundaries between them were not yet defined. Dioceses were organized into metropolitan sees under the authority of a metropolitan bishop. The position of metropolitan carried additional responsibilities and powers in the election of bishops.

Around 315 CE, the bishop of Seleucia-Ctesiphon, Mar Papa bar Aggai (310–329), declared the primacy of his see over other bishoprics in Mesopotamia and Persia. With the support of Sada, bishopric of Edessa, Papa adopted the title of Catholicos of the East. (Note: A Catholicos is an organizational form specific to the Eastern churches that has no direct equivalent in the West. The archdiocese can be considered a somewhat analogous form.) Thus, assuming the sources are reliable, (Note: These events are reported only by the Chronicle of Arbela and the acts of the Seleucian Council of 424.) the patriarchate in the East emerged before the Nicene Council, when the authority of the sees of Rome, Alexandria, and Antioch was first recognized. The list of participants in the Nicene Council of 325 CE includes two bishops from Adiabene, John of Arbela and Jacob of Nisibis. In Armenia, the ecclesiastical hierarchy began to form early, with higher positions often held by members of the old Parthian nobility. Gregory the Illuminator himself was from a nakharar family. His son Aristakes represented the Armenian Church at the Nicene Council. In the 360s, nakharars Meruzhan Artsruni and Vahan Mamikonian, with the support of the Persian army, attempted to restore Zoroastrianism in Armenia. (Note: These events are described in the novel Samuel by the Armenian writer Raffi.) Two further attempts followed in 451 and 571 CE.

There are differing views on whether the Church of the East was initially independent. According to one perspective, the catholicoses of Seleucia were entirely independent; according to others, they were subordinate either to the bishops of Antioch or Edessa. Traditional Western historiography dated the founding of the Church of the East to the Ephesian Council of 431 CE, following theNestorian schism. In contrast, Eastern tradition asserts that by 431 CE, the Church of the East had long existed as a separate organization, and by the 7th century, the name of Nestorius was not mentioned in any acts of church councils. Formally, autocephaly was proclaimed at the council in Seleucia-Ctesiphon in 410 CE. Its canons established that each city and its surrounding area should be governed by a single bishop, ordained by three other bishops.

Uniform church holidays were also established, and the rules of the Nicene Council of 325 CE were recognized, adapted to the context of the Church of the East. The fact that the 410 CE council was co-chaired by the Western bishop Marutha indicates the unity of the Church of the East with the Western church at that time. Marutha persuaded Shah Yazdegerd I to recognize the bishop of Seleucia-Ctesiphon as the head of the Christians in his empire, thereby integrating the Christian church into the political system. The principles of ecclesiastical organization were clarified in 544 CE by Patriarch Aba I. It was established that the election of a catholicos-patriarch required the assembly of four metropolitan bishops from the patriarchal province, each accompanied by three bishops. Under Ishoyahb I, the hierarchy of the Church of the East received a theological interpretation, likened to the heavens, with the patriarch symbolizing the apostles Peter and Paul at the head.

No documents regarding the election of bishops before 410 CE have been preserved. For later periods, data from the Eastern Synodicon, compiled under Patriarch Timothy I and revised under Archbishop Elijah of Nisibis (d. 1049), can be used. According to the earliest testimony in the Synodicon, a canon adopted at the Seleucia-Ctesiphon council in 410 CE required all hierarchs of the Church of the East to be subordinate to the bishop of Seleucia-Ctesiphon, who was referred to in the council's acts as the Great or Grand Metropolitan and soon thereafter as the Catholicos of the East. Later, the title Catholicos-Patriarch was used. Unlike the Roman Empire, the boundaries of the Church of the East's ecclesiastical provinces did not always align with the administrative boundaries of the Sasanian Empire. Reliable information about the structure of ecclesiastical organization in the early period has not been preserved. Data collected in the 18th century by Joseph Assemani and Michel Le Quien are difficult to interpret due to inconsistencies in geographical nomenclature. Later authors of diocese lists (J. Wiltsch, Carl Zachau, Beresford Kidd) lack consensus even on the number of metropolitan sees.

For most of its history, the Church had approximately six internal metropolitan sees. At the 410 CE council, they were listed in hierarchical order: metropolitan see of the capital centered in Seleucia-Ctesiphon (central Iraq), Beth Huzaye centered in Beth-Lapat (western Iran), Nisibis (on the border between Turkey and Iraq, centered in the city of the same name), Maishan (Basra, southern Iraq), the metropolitan see of Adiabene centered in Arbela (Erbil, northern Iraq), and Beth Garmaï in the region of the same name centered in Kirkuk, northeastern Iraq. These metropolitan sees did not cover the entire Christian-populated territory of the Sasanian Empire. Independent bishops served the inhabitants of various remote regions, such as Pars and the "islands" (Beth Qatraye). An influential Christian community with its own bishop existed in Merv as early as the first half of the 5th century. Additionally, the number of external metropolitan sees located outside the Sasanian Empire grew. In 554 CE, the bishop of Kashkar received special status and authority to organize the election of a new patriarch.

=== State and Church in the 5th–6th Centuries ===
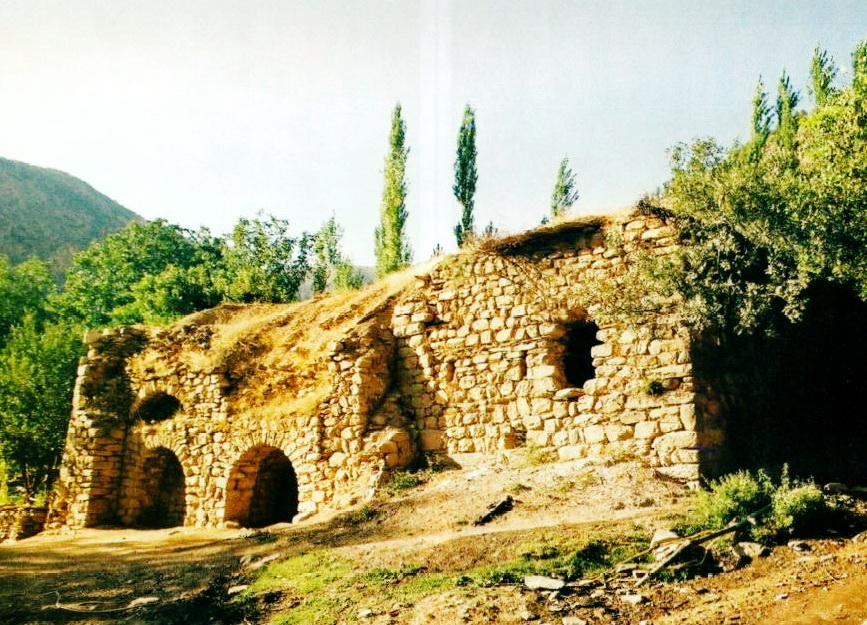
Nestorian church of Saint John from the 6th century in the Assyrian village of Geramon in the modern Turkish province of Şırnak

The 410 CE council established the church as an official structure. It was important for secular authorities to ensure control over the growing number of Christian subjects, while the catholicos could now resort to state enforcement methods in combating ecclesiastical opposition. The resulting balance was unstable and did not guarantee Christians full freedom of religion. Yazdegerd I, in turn, relied on catholicoses to address internal political issues and maintain diplomatic contacts with the Roman Empire. (Note: The available sources do not allow us to definitively reconstruct the chronology of events. Some argue that the persecution of Christians began at the start of Bahram V's reign, not under Yazdegerd I.)

The resumption of persecutions at the end of Yazdegerd I's reign and the beginning of Bahram V's reign (421–439) is associated with dissatisfaction among Zoroastrian elites, the centralization of state institutions, and the renewed war with Rome. (Note: Available sources do not allow for a definitive reconstruction of the chronology of events. There are arguments suggesting that the persecution of Christians occurred only at the beginning of Bahram V's reign, not under Yazdegerd I. Herman 2014, p. 90) The immediate cause, according to the hagiography of Bishop Abda, was the religious zeal of Christians who began destroying Zoroastrian temples. Yazdegerd's inability to manage radical Christian elements led to his death and turmoil within the Church of the East.

Early in the patriarchate of Mar Dadisho I (421–456), a representative council in Markabta of the Arabs was convened, which reaffirmed the primacy of the bishop of Seleucia-Ctesiphon and abolished the right of appeal to the Western church. The council's declaration of the catholicos's independence from the Western Fathers' should likely be understood in the context of internal church issues, as the proclamation of autocephaly in 410 CE was not contested. Meanwhile, in the Roman Empire, the rivalry between the Alexandrian and Antiochian theological schools, culminating in the Nestorian schism, led to the migration of many of Nestorius's supporters to the Sasanian Empire. Antiochian theology, expressed in the works of Theodore of Mopsuestia and Ibas of Edessa, was rejected by the Western church but continued to dominate in the East.

Over the following decades, the theology of the church increasingly incorporated "Nestorian" elements, deepening the divide between the Roman church and the Church of the East. In 484 CE, the metropolitan of Nisibis, Barsauma, convened the Council of Beth Lapat, which permitted bishops to marry, deposed Barsauma's opponent, Catholicos Babai (457–484), (Note: In the words of Catholic historian Adrian Fortescue, "The reign of the illiterate Babai was an expression of the extreme degradation of the Church".) and adopted the teachings of Nestorius's mentor, Theodore of Mopsuestia, as the doctrine of the Church of the East.

However, the 484 CE council was not recognized by the church, and its decisions were overturned the following year. Church unity was restored at the 486 CE council in Seleucia-Ctesiphon, where the oldest surviving creed, with a clear dyophysite orientation, was adopted. In 489 CE, when the Persian school in Edessa was closed by Byzantine Emperor Zeno for its "Nestorian" character, it relocated to Nisibis, becoming the Nisibis School again, prompting an exodus of Nestorians to the Sasanian Empire. The definitive shift toward Nestorianism is associated with the reign of Patriarch-Catholicos Mar Babai (497–502). (Note: According to Catholic historian Adrian Fortescue, the reign of the illiterate Babai marked the extreme degradation of the church. Fortescue 1913, p. 82) Under him, several councils were held, solidifying the church's adoption of Nestorianism. Barsauma leveraged his good relations with Shah Peroz I (461–484) to organize persecutions of Monophysites in his diocese. (Note: These churches are widely defined as monophysite in historiography, including modern historiography. However, theologically speaking, it is considered more accurate to call their followers Miaphysites.)

Little is known about the status of Christians at the turn of the 5th and 6th centuries under Shahs Balash and Kavad I. From 521 to 539 CE, the Church of the East experienced its first schism, caused by disputes over the succession to the patriarchal throne. Meanwhile, having strengthened its structures in Nisibis, Ctesiphon, and Gondishapur, the Church of the East began to expand beyond the Sasanian Empire. Another Byzantine–Persian conflict (540–545) led to new persecutions of the church under Khosrow I. Christians were suspected of involvement in the rebellion of Prince Anoshazad, but Catholicos Aba I (540–552) managed to prove his co-religionists' innocence. Under his energetic leadership, the church successfully weathered these trials and strengthened its structures.

Although a 562 CE law conditioned freedom of Christian worship on the rejection of proselytism, by the mid-century, the canonical territory of the Church of the East included all countries to the east and those immediately west of the Euphrates, encompassing the Arabian Peninsula, Socotra, Mesopotamia, Media, Bactria, Hyrcania, and India. Excavations conducted in the 1930s south of Baghdad uncovered the remains of a late 6th-century church and ceramics with Syriac inscriptions.

=== Inter-Church Conflicts in the Early 7th Century ===
The Iranian community of the Syriac Jacobite Church reached its peak in the early 7th century, thanks to the support of Shah Khosrow II's (591–628) wife Shirin and court physician Gabriel of Sinjar, both of whom belonged to the Jacobite church. According to the 12th-century chronicler Michael the Syrian, Khosrow II favored Monophysites, but the Byzantine Theophanes the Confessor claimed the shah continued to support Nestorians. In 596 CE, at Khosrow II's initiative, the monk Sabrisho I (596–604) was elected patriarch. The unprecedented honors with which Khosrow greeted the newly elected head of the church strengthened the position of the Church of the East as a legitimate religious institution in the Sasanian Empire. Sabrisho, in turn, recognized the secular authority of the Zoroastrian ruler.

Nestorian catholicoses accompanied Persian military expeditions into Byzantine Mesopotamia in 537 and 603 CE. During the Byzantine–Persian War of 602–628, Iranian forces occupied territories where the majority of the population were non-Chalcedonians. According to the Armenian historian Sebeos, during a church council in Ctesiphon (circa 616 CE) attended by representatives of the Church of the East, the Syriac Jacobite Church, and Chalcedonians, Khosrow II decreed that Miaphysite doctrine be mandatory for all Christians in Iran. According to Russian researcher E. A. Zabolotny, in reality, the council merely announced that the Jacobite Church would receive patronage alongside the Church of the East.

After the death of Patriarch Gregory in 609 CE, Khosrow prohibited the election of a new church head. During the vacancy of the patriarchal throne (609–628), the Church of the East was effectively led by the theologian Babai the Great, who implemented measures to strengthen and restore the church's position in Persia. Canadian historian Geoffrey Greatrex suggests that Khosrow II's actions were aimed at maintaining a balance between Nestorians and Monophysites. While the former were deprived of a leader for an extended period, the latter lost in the struggle for control over Mesopotamian monasteries.

By 627–628 CE, the influence of the Jacobites in Iran had been restored when northern Mesopotamia was occupied by the Byzantine forces of Heraclius. Heraclius pursued a policy of rapprochement with non-Chalcedonians, which allowed the Monophysite hierarchy in Iran to fully establish itself under Marutha of Tikrit (629–649). Marutha adopted the title of maphrian. During his tenure, the Arab conquest of Persia began. The last Sasanian shah, Yazdegerd III, was killed in 651 CE. According to the Arab scholar Al-Tha'alibi, a Christian bishop organized his burial.

== Bibliography ==
=== Russian-language sources ===
- Ter-Davtyan, K. (1994). Армянские жития и мученичества V — XVII вв [Armenian hagiographies and martyrdoms of the 5th - 17th centuries] (in Russian). Ереван: Наири. p. 484.
- Brock, S. (1995). Христология Церкви Востока [Christology of the Eastern Church] (in Russian). Вестник древней истории. pp. 39–53.
- Doroshenko, E. A. (1982). Зороастрийцы в Иране: историко-этнографический очерк [Zoroastrians in Iran: historical and ethnographic sketch] (in Russian). М.: Наука. p. 136.
- Zabolotny, E. A. (2020). Сирийское христианство между Византией и Ираном [Syrian Christianity between Byzantium and Iran] (in Russian). СПб.: Наука. p. 406. ISBN 978-5-02-040526-4.
- Nikitin, A. B. (2015). "К истории христианства в Мерве" [Toward a History of Christianity in Merv]. Проблемы истории, филологии, культуры (in Russian). 1 (47): 164–170.
- Reva, K. A. (2019). Богослужение Ассирийской церкви Востока: история и современность [Worship of the Assyrian Church of the East: History and Modernity] (in Russian). Сергиев Посад: Актуальные вопросы изучения христианского наследия Востока. pp. 109–124. ISBN 978-5-6042773-6-2.
- Seleznev, N. N. (2001). Ассирийская церковь Востока. Исторический очерк [The Assyrian Church of the East. Historical sketch] (in Russian). М.: RSUH. p. 105. ISBN 5-86748-082-8.

=== English-language sources ===
- Angelov, A. (2014). Bishop over "Those Outside": Imperial Diplomacy and the Boundaries of Constantine's Christianity. Vol. 54. Greek, Roman, and Byzantine Studies. pp. 274–292.
- Asmussen, J. P. (1983). Christians in Iran // The Cambridge History of Iran. Vol. 3(2). Cambridge: Cambridge University Press. pp. 924–948. ISBN 978-0-521-24693-4.
- Baca-Winters, Keenan (2025). "A Most Vicious Game: Memory, Politics, and Religion in the Reign of Xusrō II". Hunara: Journal of Ancient Iranian Arts and History. 3 (2): 25–53.
- Barnes, T. D. (1985). Constantine and the Christians of Persia. Vol. 75. The Journal of Roman Studies. pp. 126–136.
- Baum, W.; Winkler, D. W. (2003). The Church of the East: A Concise History. London-New York: Routledge-Curzon. p. 204. ISBN 9781134430192.
- Becker, A. H. (2007). Beyond the Spatial and Temporal Limes: Questioning the "Parting of the Ways" Outside the Roman Empire // The Ways That Never Parted. Jews and Christians in Late Antiquity and the Early Middle Ages. Minneapolis: Fortress Press. pp. 373–392. ISBN 978-0-8006-6209-7.
- Becker, A. H. (2014). Political Theology and Religious Diversity in the Sasanian Empire // Jews, Christians and Zoroastrians. Religious Dynamics in a Sasanian Context. Minneapolis: Gorgias Press. pp. 7–26. ISBN 978-1-4632-0250-7.
- Brock, S. P. (1982). Christians in the Sasanian empire: a case of divided loyalties. Vol. 18. Studies in Church History. pp. 1–19.
- Brock, S. P. (2006). Fire from Heaven: Studies in Syriac Theology and Liturgy. Aldershot: Ashgate. p. 368. ISBN 9780754659082.
- Burgess, R. W. (1999). The Dates of the First Siege of Nisibis and the Death of James of Nisibis. Vol. 69. Byzantion: Byzantion. pp. 7–17.
- Burgess R. W., Mercier R. (1999). The dates of the martyrdom of Simeon bar Sabba'e and the "great massacre". Vol. 117. Analecta Bollandiana. pp. 9–66.
- Cassis, M. (2002). Kokhe, Cradle of the Church of the East: An Archaeological and Comparative Study. Vol. 2. Journal of the Canadian Society for Syriac Studies. pp. 62–78.
- Daryaee, T. (2009). Sasanian Persia: The Rise and Fall of an Empire. I.B.Tauris & Co Ltd. p. 225. ISBN 978-1-85043-898-4.
- Filoni, F. (2017). The Church in Iraq. The Catholic University of America Press. p. 195. ISBN 9780813229652.
- Fortescue, A. (1913). The Lesser Eastern Churches. London: Catholic Truth Society Christian Knowledge. p. 468.
- Foster, J. (1939). The Church of the T'ang Dynasty. London: Society for Promoting Christian Knowledge.
- Greatrex, G. (2003). Khusro II and the Christians of his empire. Vol. 3. Journal of the Canadian Society for Syriac Studies. pp. 78–88.
- Jany, J. (2007). Criminal Justice in Sasanian Persia. Vol. 42. Iranica Antiqua. pp. 347–386.
- de Jong, A. F. (2005). Zoroastrian Religious Polemics and Their Contexts: Interconfessional Relations in the Sasanian Empire // Religious Polemics in Context. Studies in Theology and Religion. Vol. 11. BRILL. pp. 48–63. ISBN 978-90-04-49530-2.
- Jullien, C. (2021). Conversion to christianity in the Sasanian empire. Political and theological issues // Iranianate and Syriac Christianity in Late Antiquity and the Early Islamic Period. Vol. 87. Austrian Academy of Sciences Press. pp. 11–32.
- Harrak, A. (2002). Trade Routes and the Chritianization of the Near East. Vol. 2. Journal of the Canadian Society for Syriac Studies. pp. 46–61.
- Herman, G. (2014). The Last Years of Yazdgird I and the Christians // Jews, Christians and Zoroastrians. Religious Dynamics in a Sasanian Context. Minneapolis: Gorgias Press. pp. 67–90. ISBN 978-1-4632-0250-7.
- Koltun-Fromm, N. (2011). Jewish-Christian Conversation in Fourth-Century Persian Mesopotamia: A Reconstructed Conversation). Gorgias Press. p. 188. ISBN 978-1-4632-0156-2.
- McDonough, S. (2008). A Second Constantine?: The Sasanian King Yazdgard in Christian History and Historiography. Vol. 1. Journal of Late Antiquity. pp. 127–140.
- McDonough, S. (2001). Bishops or Bureaucrats?: Christian Clergy and the State in the Middle Sasanian Period // Current Research in Sasanian Archaeology, Art and History. pp. 87–92. ISBN 9781407333052.
- McDonough, S. (2011). The Legs of the Throne: Kings, Elites, and Subjects in Sasanian Iran // The Roman Empire in Context. Historical and Comparative Perspectives. Wiley-Blackwell. pp. 290–321. ISBN 978-0-470-65557-3.
- Malech, G. D. (1910). History of the Syrian nation and the Old Evangelical-Apostolic Church of the East: from remote antiquity to the present time. Minneapolis: University of California Libraries.
- Minov, Sergey (2020). Memory and Identity in the Syriac Cave of Treasures: Rewriting the Bible in Sasanian Iran. Brill.
- Mokhtarian, J. (2015). The Boundaries of an Infidel in Zoroastrianism: A Middle Persian Term of Otherness for Jews, Christians, and Muslims. Vol. 48. Iranian Studies. pp. 99–115.
- Patterson, L. E. (2017). Minority Religions in the Sasanian Empire: Suppression, Integration and Relations with Rome // Sasanian Persia. Between Rome and the Steppes of Eurasia. Edinburgh University Press. pp. 181–198. ISBN 9781474401029.
- Payne, R. E. (2015). A State of Mixture: Christians, Zoroastrians, and Iranian Political Culture in Late Antiquity. Oakland: University of California Press. p. 320. ISBN 9780520292451.
- Pourshariati, P. (2008). Decline and Fall of the Sasanian Empire. London: I.B.Tauris & Co Ltd. p. 537. ISBN 978-1-84511-645-3.
- Rapp, S. H. Jr. (2014). The Sasanian World through Georgian Eyes. Caucasia and the Iranian Commonwealth in Late Antique Georgian Literature. Routledge. p. 513. ISBN 9781472425522.
- Roberson, R. (1999). The Eastern Christian Churches: A Brief Survey. Rome: Orientalia Christiana. ISBN 9788872103210.
- Russell, J. R. (1987). Zoroastrianism in Armenia. Harvard Iranian Series. Vol. 5. Harvard University Press. p. 578. ISBN 0674968506.
- Saint-Laurent, J.-N. (2015). Missionary Stories and the Formation of the Syriac Churches. University of California Press. p. 232. ISBN 9780520960589.
- Smith, K. (2019). Constantine and the Captive Christians of Persia: Martyrdom and Religious Identity in Late Antiquity. University of California Press. p. 252. ISBN 978-0520308398.
- Stewart, J. (1928). Nestorian Missionary Enterprise: A Church on Fire. Edinburgh: T. & T. Clark.
- Strong, J. D. (2015). Candida: An Ante-Nicene Martyr in Persia. Vol. 23. Journal of Early Christian Studies. pp. 389–412.
- Vine, A. R. (1978). The Nestorian Churches. Ams Pr Inc. p. 227. ISBN 978-0404161880.
- Wood, P. (2012). Collaborators and Dissidents: Christians in Sasanian Iraq in the Early Fifth Century // Late Antiquity: Eastern Perspectives. Gibb Memorial Trust. p. 180. ISBN 978-0-906094-53-2.

=== German-language sources ===
- Bruns, P. (2011). Bischofswahl und Bischofsernennung im Synodicon Orientale // Episcopal Elections in Late Antiquity [Bishop elections and bishop appointments in the Synodicon Orientale // Episcopal Elections in Late Antiquity]. Arbeiten zur Kirchengeschichte (in German). Rome: De Gruyter. pp. 109–126. ISBN 978-3-11-026860-7.
- Hutter, M. (1998). Shirin, Nestorianer und Monophysiten. Königliche Kirchenpolitik im späten Sasanidenreich [Shirin, Nestorians and Monophysites. Royal church politics in the late Sasanian Empire] (in German). Roma: Pontificio Istituto Orientale. pp. 373–386.
- Klingenberg, A. (2017). Zwischen Ktesiphon und Konstantinopel – Christen und Christianisierung in Persien im Kontext der sāsānidish-römischen Beziehungen // Die Christianisierung Kleinasiens in der Spätantike [Between Ctesiphon and Constantinople - Christians and Christianization in Persia in the context of Sāsānidish-Roman relations // The Christianization of Asia Minor in Late Antiquity]. Asia Minor Studien (in German). Bonn: Dr. Rudolf Habelt GmbH. pp. 109–126. ISBN 978-3-7749-4104-5.

=== French-language sources ===
- Jugie, M. (1935). "L'ecclésiologie des nestoriens" [The ecclesiology of Nestorians]. Revue des études byzantines [Byzantine Studies journal] (in French). 34 (177): 5–25. doi:10.3406/rebyz.1935.2817.
- Jullien, C.; Jullien, F. (2002). Aux frontières de l'iranité: «nāsrāyē» et «krīstyonē» des inscriptions du mobad KirdīR: enquête littéraire et historique [At the frontiers of Iranianness: "nāsrāyē" and "krīstyonē" inscriptions from mobad KirdīR: literary and historical investigation] (in French). Vol. 49. Numen. pp. 282–335.
- Labourt, J. (1904). Le christianisme dans l'empire Perse [Christianity in the Persian Empire] (in French). Paris: Harvard University. p. 358.
