= Hadiqat al-Haqiqa =

Sufi Persian poetry book by Sanai Ghaznavi

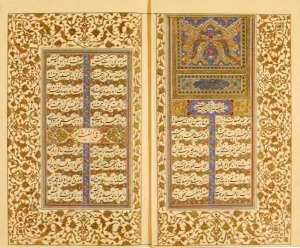
Traditional printing of Hadiqat al-Haqiqa

The mathnawi Hadiqat al-Haqiqa va Shari'at al-Tariqa (Arabic: حديقة الحقيقة وشريعة الطريقة, lit. 'The Garden of Truth and The Path to Trek') or Elahi-Nameh (Persian: الهی‌نامه, lit. 'Treatise to Theology') is an early Sufi book of poetry written in the Persian language, composed by Sanai Ghaznavi, with an Irfan theme. Sanai started composing it in the year 1130 AD (524 AH) and finished it in the year 1131 AD (525 AH). The book has ten thousand verses in ten chapters; The subjects of this book, in addition to praising Allah, the Last Prophet of Islam, his family and companions, are about intellect, knowledge, wisdom and love.

The manuscripts of Hadiqat al-Haqiqa have been corrected and republished by Mohammad Taghi Modarres Razavi in 1949. Another correction has been published by Mohammad Jafar Yahaghi and Mehdi Zarghani in two volumes in October 2018.

== Its validity ==
Compared to other valuable works of Sanai such as his sonnets and odes, Hadiqat al-Haqiqa has been the most ambitious and accepted by character of more people over the centuries.

Hadiqat al-Haqiqa is one of the poem books that has influenced many poets. By composing this poem, Sanai opened a new chapter in composing mystical poems in the history of literature and mysticism.

Great poets such as Khaqani in composing Tuhfat al-Iraqayn and Nizami Ganjavi in composing Makhzan al-Asrar were under the direct influence of Hadiqat al-Haqiqa. Just a few years after Hadiqat al-Haqiqa release, Attar of Nishapur and Rumi reached the peak of development of mystical mathnawis.

Rumi's companions, who gathered at his school, sometimes turned to study of Hadiqat al-Haqiqa of Sanai, which Rumi was interested in too.

== Sample poem ==
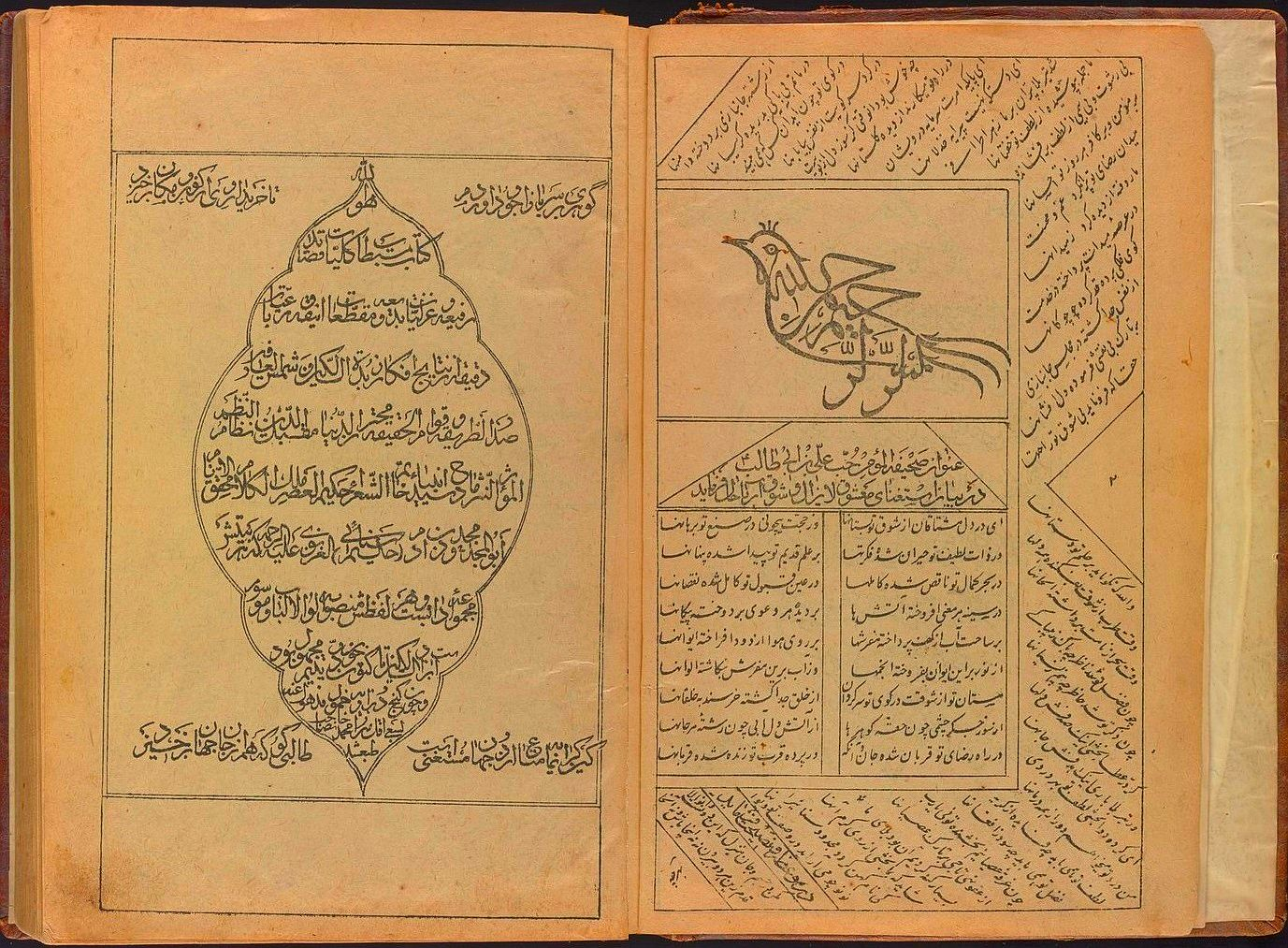
Lithographic printing of Hadiqat al-Haqiqa

A poem called The truth and the way from the book translated to English as follows:

راه دور از دل دِرنگی تست
کفر و دین از پی دُورنگی تست
ورنه یک خطوتست راه بِدو
بنده باشی شوی تو شاه بِدو
لقب رنگها مجازی کن
خور ز دریای بی نیازی کن
گفت بگذار و گِرد کرد برآی
بندهای گران ز خود بگشای

Translation:

The way is long because your heart is hesitant
Infidelity and religion exist because of your hypocrisy
Otherwise, there is only one way towards him (God)
If you are a servant, will become king with him (God)
Turn a blind eye to the splendor of the world
Feed on the sea of needlessness
Cease talking and start to act
To undo your heavy shackles that burden you

== Another Hadiqat ==
In mystical Persian literature, there is another book of the same nameو called Hadiqat al Hadiqa, attributed to Ghotb al-Din Mohammad Ibn Motahar Jami (1048–1141 AD). "Ghotb al-Din" is one of Sheikh Ahmad-e Jami's grandchildren and has included some of his poems in this book. This book was published about a century after Hadiqat al-Haqiqa of Sanai and is remarkable by experts. This book, in addition of same name with the book of Sanai, has similarities with Sanai's Hadiqat al-Haqiqa in terms of content and general purpose. This "hadiqat" is also a trove and a collection of issues of practical wisdom and mystical manifestations and opinions that have been written due to the necessity of time and to guide the followers. But apart from the resemblance of name and general similarity in content and purpose, these two books have notable differences in language theme and structure. Basically, Hadiqat of Ghotb al-Din Mohammad Ibn Motahar Jami is in prose form, but Hadiqat al-Haqiqa of Sanai is in mathnawi form. In addition to the linguistic differences, these two works are different in structure and number of chapters. Sanai's Hadiqat al-Haqiqa has one introduction and ten chapters, while Hadiqat of Ghotb al-Din Mohammad Ibn Motahar Jami, in addition to the editor's introduction, has fourteen chapters each with seventy one various sections. The character and poems of Sanai Ghaznavi have always been respected and considered, and it is not unlikely that "Ghotb al-Din Mohammad Ibn Motahar Jami" wanted to devise another design of "Hadiqat al-Haqiqa" that is appropriate to the language and intellectual needs of his time.

== See also ==
- Karnameye Balkh
- Seir al-Ebad elal-Ma'ad
- Tariq ut-tahqiq
- Understanding Islamic Sciences
