= Seir al-Ebad elal-Ma'ad =

Old Persian poetry book

Seir al-Ebad elal-Ma'ad (meaning: the journey of the servants in return to origin) is a poetry book of Sanai in form of Masnavi which moral issues are discussed. Its release date back to year 1131 AD (525 AH). In this book, Sanai discusses the creation of man and psyches and wisdoms through allegory. The Masnavi of Seir al-Ebad elal-Ma'ad was composed in same rhythm of Hadiqat ul-Haqiqah and is about 800 verses long.

Sanai composed Seir al-Ebad elal-Ma'ad in Sarakhs, Razavi Khorasan province, Iran and finished it with the praise of someone called Abu al-Mafakher Saif al-Din Muhammad ibn Mansour, the judge of Sarakhs.

Seir al-Ebad elal-Ma'ad is in fact an allusion to the journey of the mystic in the authorities of annihilation. During it, the poet narrates the story of the passage of the soul, guiding by intellect through the levels and curtains of a Neoplatonism world. Similar to this work in European literature is Dante's Divine Comedy. In pre-Islamic literature, the text of Book of Arda Viraf depicts an enduring theme of spiritual journey to the other world.

In the three transformations of Sanai's life, Seir al-Ebad elal-Ma'ad is at the stage where Hakim Sanai is transferred from the pure poetic period of his youth to the Sufism period. This work was amendmented and re-published by Mohammad Taghi Modarres Razavi under the name "Masnavis of Sanai" in 1969 with association of University of Tehran Press.

== Synopsis ==
Seir al-Ebad elal-Ma'ad is a Masnavi form poet book that can be studied without interruption, without divisions and chapters. This work basically has an introduction and three major sections: Introduction in the description of wind; The first section is about life or organ world or appearance of light in life in darkness of the material world; The second section is the journey in world of elements or soul and the third section is the stage of consciousness or Reason. In general, this orderly poet book is only a story in terms of storyline and other sub-stories have not interrupted it.

Seir al-Ebad elal-Ma'ad, in the beginning has no acknowledgment and gratitude and such introductions. The narration begins with the descent of the human soul from the upper world to the lower world and explains the stages of the soul and the animal soul and their results. The seeker finds himself trapped in the clutches of impure tempers. On the one hand, the rational soul calls him up, and on the other hand, tempers pulls him to the ground. Unaware and confused, he seeks guidance until he is finally confronted with a "gentle and spiritual old man". The old man introduces himself as a messenger of the whole intellect who has descended to save him. They start the journey together and the old man sits on the seeker's shoulder. Then the travel steps are followed.

== Sample poem ==
Some verses from this book translated to English as follows:

من بمانده در این میان موقوف

Translation:

I'm stuck here in the middle of universe

مقصدم دور و راه نیک مخوف

Translation:

My destination is far away and the good way is dreadful

خانه پردود و دیدگان پردرد

Translation:

The home is smoky and my eyes is full of pain
(My will is weak and I look at the universe with the pain)

راه پر تیغ و تیر و من نامرد

Translation:

The path is full of razors and arrows and I am cowardly

...

نی مرا علم و اجتهادی بود

Translation:

There is no mental faculty and no knowledge for me

نه بر اینهام اعتمادی بود

Translation:

Although cannot reliance on use of which both

...

روز آخر به راه باریکی

Translation:

The last day in a simple path

دیدم اندر میان تاریکی

Translation:

I saw in the solution in middle of the darkness

== See also ==
- Hadiqat al Haqiqa
- Karnameye Balkh
- Tariq ut-tahqiq
