= Mirza Abd ol-Razzaq Faghfuri =

Iranian tile artist (1887–1950)

- میرزا عبدالرزاق فغفوری
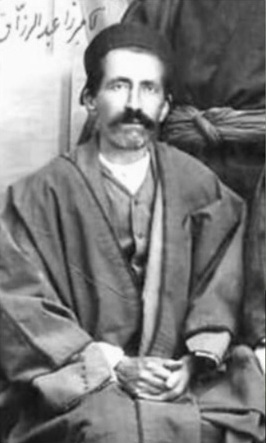
- Portrait of Mirza Abd ol-Razzaq Faghfuri
- Born: 1887; Shiraz, Qajar Iran
- Died: 1950 (aged 62–63); Shiraz, Pahlavi Iran
- Resting place: Shah Da'i-Allah cemetery, Shiraz
- Known for: Tile making
- Style: Narrative tilework
- Children: 3 daughters, 1 son

Mirza Abd ol-Razzaq Faghfuri (1887–1950; Persian: میرزا عبدالرزاق فغفوری) was an Iranian tile artist renowned for his mastery of narrative tilework during the late Qajar (1789–1925) and early Pahlavi (1925–1979) periods. Active for over twenty-six years, he played a crucial role in the development of Persian tile painting and left a lasting impact on the material culture of Shiraz. His work, often depicting Iranian historical, religious, and literary themes, adorned numerous buildings in the city and influenced later Shirazi tile craftsmen.

== Name ==
The title "Mirza" was traditionally given to educated men in the Qajar (1789–1925) period, particularly those with literacy and formal training in fields such as calligraphy, administration, or the arts. In Faghfuri’s case, it signifies that he was not merely an artisan but a skilled craftsman with extensive artistic knowledge. The epithet "Faghfuri" was conferred upon him by Reza Shah Pahlavi (r. 1925–1941), who, upon witnessing the quality of his tilework, compared it to fine Chinese porcelain, known as chini-ye faghfur. The word "faghfur", historically used in Persian to refer to Chinese emperors, was meant to symbolize the refinement and delicacy of his work.

Despite widespread recognition under this name, Faghfuri never signed his tiles using the title "Faghfuri." Instead, his signatures followed traditional Iranian artistic humility, often stating, "in the humble workshop of Mirza Abd ol-Razzaq".

== Biography and career ==
Born in Shiraz in 1887 during the reign of Naser al-Din Shah Qajar (r. 1848–1896), Faghfuri was raised in a city renowned for its long-standing artistic traditions, particularly in tilework and decorative architecture. At the age of ten, he began an apprenticeship in the workshop of master Heydar, where he first worked on pottery and simple glazed ceramics. His natural talent and dedication allowed him to establish his own workshop within a decade. His workshop became one of the most respected in Shiraz, producing Haft-rang ("seven-color") tiles, a technique which flourished in Qajar-period architectural decoration.

Faghfuri gained fame for his ability to create complex narrative tile paintings, a skill that distinguished him from other tile artisans of his time. His compositions frequently depicted scenes from Persian literature, religious stories, and historical events, executed with a distinctive color palette, detailed figures, and intricate calligraphy.

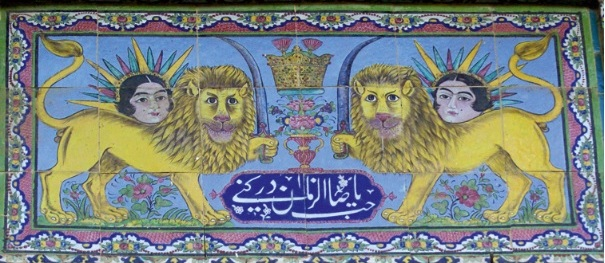
Tilework featuring the Qajar Lion and Sun emblem, accompanied by the Kiani Crown. Depicted in the Dokhanchi House, dated 1916

His works adorned more than eighty historical buildings in Shiraz, including mosques, caravanserais, private homes, and public institutions. However, only fifteen sites contain signed inscriptions, definitively linking them to his workshop. Among these are the Atrvash House, Dokhanchi House, and Namazi Clinic, which serve as the most direct surviving examples of his work. His contributions were instrumental in popularizing haft-rang tile painting in Shiraz, an art form that had originated in the Timurid and Safavid periods but saw its peak during the Qajar era.

Faghfuri died in Shiraz in 1950 at the age of 63, reportedly due to prolonged exposure to toxic kiln gases used in the tile-making process. His grave is located in the Shah Da'i-Allah cemetery in Shiraz, near the workshop of his son, Karim.

== Themes and influences ==
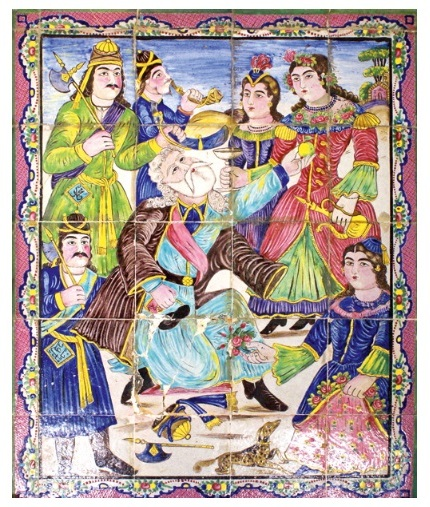
Tilework depicting the story of Shaykh Sanan and the Christian maiden by Attar of Nishapur. Located at the Ziyaiyan House, dated 1936

The subject matter of Faghfuri’s tile paintings was deeply rooted in Iranian literary, religious, and historical traditions. Many of his panels feature scenes from Ferdowsi’s Shahnameh and Nizami Ganjavi’s Khamsa, particularly well-known narratives such as Khosrow and Shirin, Bahram Gur, and The Seven Beauties. His religious-themed works often illustrated Quranic stories, including Yusof and Zolaykha, the court of Solomon, and portraits of Shi’i saints and imams.

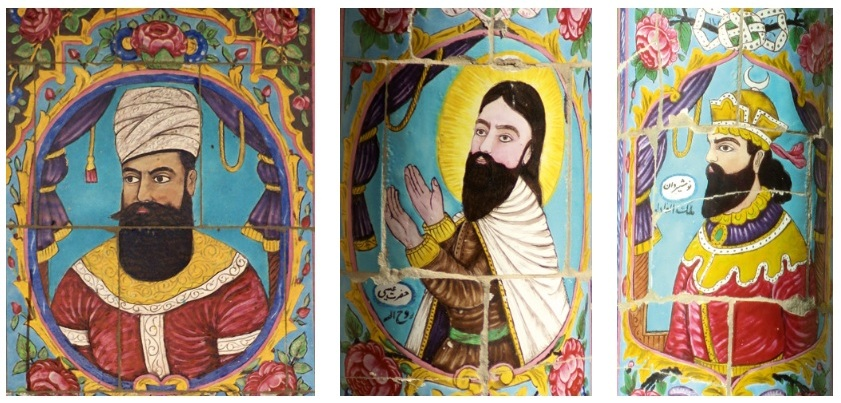
Tilework depicting (from left to right): Karim Khan Zand, Jesus, and Khosrow I Anushirvan. Located at the Ziyaiyan House, dated 1921

Additionally, his tile panels incorporated pre-Islamic Iranian imagery, such as the investiture of the founder of the Sasanian Empire, Ardashir I (r. 224–242), and battle scenes featuring the mythological Iranian hero Rostam. He also produced portraits of Qajar rulers, noblemen, and commoners, showcasing his ability to depict both royal grandeur and everyday life.

Faghfuri’s artistic style was shaped by multiple visual traditions, including Persian manuscript painting, Qajar portraiture, and European lithographs. He was heavily influenced by Forsat-od-Dowleh Shirazi, a Shirazi scholar and painter, and frequently referenced illustrated lithographs such as Name-ye Khosrowan, which served as a visual template for his historical and mythical depictions. His portraits of Iranian kings and warriors closely resembled those in Qajar-era lithographs, highlighting his ability to adapt pre-existing artistic conventions to the medium of tile painting.

Faghfuri’s artistic techniques and narrative tilework were widely imitated by later Shirazi tile painters, and his workshop played a key role in influencing the next generation of craftsmen. His selection of themes, painting methods, and approach to composition became a reference for later artists, many of whom replicated his style in subsequent projects.

== Recognition and legacy ==
Despite his immense contributions to Persian tilework, Faghfuri’s name faded from public memory for more than seventy years after his death. His work was rediscovered in 1997, when Hadi Seyf, a specialist in Qajar popular art, published a study highlighting his significance and contributions. Faghfuri’s workshop was inherited by his son, Karim Faghfuri, who continued producing tiles in his father’s style and maintained his secret glazing formulas. However, much of Faghfuri’s specialized tile-making techniques were lost following Karim’s death.

Mirza Abd ol-Razzaq Faghfuri remains one of the most significant Iranian tile painters of the Qajar era. His narrative tilework, blending historical, literary, and religious themes, stands as a testament to the skill and creativity of Iranian craftsmen. His contributions to Shiraz’s architectural tile tradition helped preserve centuries of Iranian artistic heritage in ceramic form.

== Sources ==
- Kiyanmehr, Qobad; Davaninezhad, Forogh Karimipur (2024). "Studying and Analyzing the Motifs of Haft-Rang Tiling in Atrvash House in Shiraz to Explore the Variety of Motifs and their Forms". Journal of Iranian Handicrafts Studies. 6 (2): 83–102. doi:10.22052/hsi.2023.252857.1118.
- Seyed Mousavi, Atefeh (2024). "Mīrzā ʿAbd al-Razzāq Faġfurī: Master of Persian Tilework in the Late Qajar and Early Pahlavi Period". Journal of Material Cultures in the Muslim World. 5 (1–2): 92–133. doi:10.1163/26666286-12340057.
