= Zoroastrianism and slavery =

Zoroastrianism is considered one of the religions that legalized slavery, where poor slaves were brought in from wars.

== Sasanian Iran ==
Under this period Roman prisoners of war were used in farming in Babylonia, Shush, and Persis.

=== Sasanian laws on slavery ===
Some of the laws governing the ownership and treatment of slaves can be found in the legal compilation called the Matigan-i Hazar Datistan, a collection of rulings by Sasanian judges. Principles that can be inferred from the laws include:

- Sources of slaves were both foreign (e.g., non-Zoroastrians captives from warfare or raiding or slaves imported from outside the Empire by traders) or domestic (e.g., hereditary slaves, children sold into slavery by their fathers, or criminals enslaved as punishment). Some cases suggest that a criminal's family might also be condemned to servitude. At the time of the manuscript's composition, Iranian slavery was hereditary on the mother's side (so that a child of a free man and a slave woman would be a slave), although the author reports that in earlier Persian history it may have been the opposite, being inherited from the father's side.
- Slave-owners had the right to the slaves' income.
- While slaves were formally chattel (property) and were liable to the same legal treatment as nonhuman property (for example, they could be sold at will, rented, owned jointly, inherited, given as security for a loan, etc.), Sasanian courts did not treat them completely as objects; for example, slaves were allowed to testify in court in cases concerning them, rather than only permitted to be represented by their owners.
- Slaves were often given to the Zoroastrian fire temples as a pious offering, in which case they and their descendants would become temple-slaves.
- Excessive cruelty towards slaves could result in the owners' being brought to court; a court case involving a slave whose owner tried to drown him in the Tigris River is recorded, though without stating the outcome of the case.
- If a non-Zoroastrian slave, such as a Christian slave, converted to Zoroastrianism, he or she could pay his or her price and attain freedom; i.e., as long as the owner was compensated, manumission was required.
- Owners could also voluntarily manumit their slaves, in which case the former slave became a subject of the Sasanian King of Kings and could not lawfully be re-enslaved later. Manumissions were recorded, which suggests that a freedman who was challenged would be able to document their free status.
- Uniquely in comparison to Western slave systems, Sasanian slavery recognized partial manumission (relevant in the case of a jointly owned slave, only some of whose owners were willing to manumit). In case of a slave who was, e.g., one-half manumitted, the slave would serve in alternating years.

To free a slave (irrespective of his or her faith) was considered a good deed. Slaves had some rights including keeping gifts from the owner and at least three days of rest in the month.

== Mazdakism ==
Ibn al-Athir stated that Mazdak treated men, women, slaves, and female slaves equally, but he treated slaves and female slaves as property, distributing them among people.

== Parsis ==
Maneckji Nusservanji Dhalla stated that the Parsis in India used to buy male and female slaves from the Indian. Also in Rivayats, a collection of letters in which Parsis inquires about Zoroastrian religious rulings, include questions about slaves and religious duties. It is deduced that the Parsis purchased male, female (ayah), and child slaves. It is also mentioned that there were Zoroastrian slaves employed in arduous domestic work and on farms. A slave was tied to the land, and if the owner sold the land, the slave's ownership would pass to the buyer. Furthermore, it is noted that the Parsis forbade themselves from eating food prepared by non-Zoroastrians, considering it unclean. The Zoroastrians differed in their views on the conversion of slaves to Zoroastrianism. Zoroastrians in Iran believed they should be accepted into the faith, while others in Parsis refused, arguing that Zoroastrianism was not a proselytizing religion. A third from also some Parsis, more moderate view advocated accepting them, not for conversion but to facilitate their integration into the faith. The Parthians' life with slaves included ritual purity rules, such as accepting food prepared by them. It is concluded that the majority of their slaves were Hindus, although there are indications that some were also Christians or slaves who converted to Christianity.

== Reasons for exclusion ==
Slaves were a number of prisoners of war taken by non-Iranians, or those kidnapped and sold as slaves. However, a Zoroastrian could also become a slave if one of his parents was a slave, or if he had debts he could not repay, or if a family member sold him if he was unable to help. The majority of slaves Zoroastrians were who could not pay their debts.

Children born to a slave father also became slaves; however, during the reign of Bahram V, this law was altered: if the mother was a slave, the children were likewise considered slaves and were barred from inheritance unless the father permitted them to receive it.
