= Punishment in Sasanian culture =

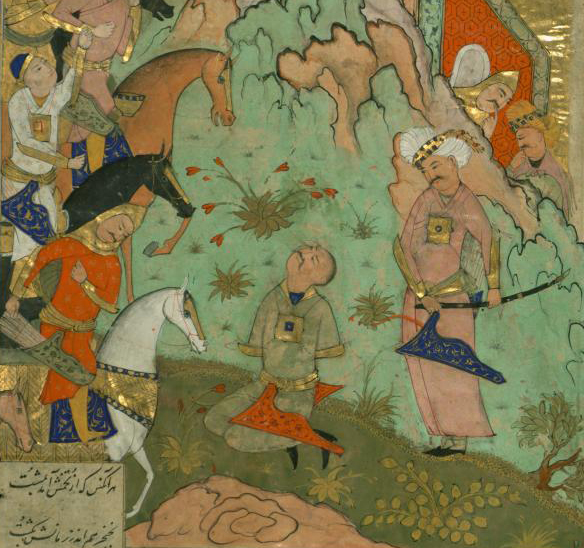
17th century depiction of the execution of the Parthian dynast Mihrak by Ardashir I.

The criminal law in the Sasanian Empire followed the same model as the Zoroastrian law, which had the intention to punish the individual in order to save the latter's soul from the otherworldly consequences of the offense. The purpose of punishment in Zoroastrian law was to save the condemned's soul from the supernatural consequences of lawbreaking. People who were punished in life were purged of their sins and spared divine punishment after death. Due to punitive punishment being considered beneficial, torture was rationalized and confessions could be extorted during torture. The chronicle of Matigan-i Hazar Datistan ("Book of a Thousand Judgements") makes mention of punishments in Zoroastrian law.

The most prevalent punishment specified is lashing, with lawbreaking acts being theoretically differentiated in harshness by the number of lashes, even up to unreasonable levels. Amputation of the nose was favored for adultery. Bandits and Christians were stomped by elephants, the most notable occurrence being during the reign of king (shah) Shapur II (r. 309–379), who had the city of Susa destroyed with 300 elephants in order to suppress a rebellion.

The same punishment methods did not apply to the Sasanian royal family, whose blood was considered clean. Thus asphyxiation in ashes or garroting were the favoured techniques for the execution of princes. Another method was to have them mutilated, since disfigured princes were not allowed to claim the throne.

== Execution ==
In the Venidad section, a section of the penal code, the word "margarzan" is used, meaning mortal sin. It specifies the prohibitions that lead to the death penalty: carrying a corpse alone, offering extremely hot food to a dog so that its throat burns, and offering bones to a dog (this is a punishment because Zoroastrianism venerates dogs. The death penalty is for anyone who throws a corpse into a waterway. Anyone who insults a judge is considered a rebel against the king and deserves death. Eating a human or dog corpse is also punishable by death.

In Zoroastrianism, abandoning the faith is considered a capital offense. In the Vendidad section, at the beginning of chapter 15, the text lists the greatest sins a Zoroastrian might commit, the first of which is spreading a non-Zoroastrian faith among Zoroastrians. The punishment for this act is two hundred beheadings. Other grounds for execution include practicing magic and armed robbery.

== Sources ==
- Canepa, Matthew (2018). "Punishments, Persian". In Nicholson, Oliver (ed.). The Oxford Dictionary of Late Antiquity. Oxford: Oxford University Press. ISBN 978-0-19-866277-8.
- Gropp, G. (2005). "Susa v. The Sasanian period". Encyclopaedia Iranica.
- Shahbazi, A. Shapur (1993). "Crown Prince". Encyclopaedia Iranica, Vol. VI, Fasc. 4. pp. 430–432.
