= Mohammad Taghi Modarres Razavi =

Iranian author, University professor and literary researcher

- محمدتقی مدرس رضوی
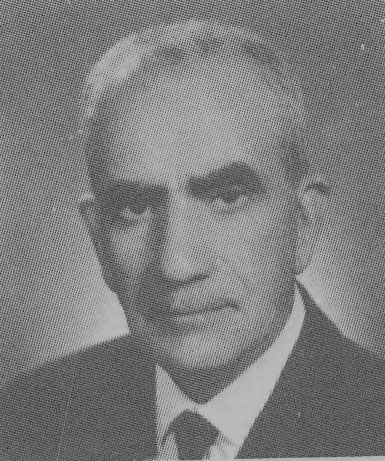
- Born: 18 March 1896; Mashhad, Razavi Khorasan province, Iran
- Died: 19 November 1986 (aged 90); Tehran, Iran
- Education: Literary sciences; Jurisprudence; Philosophy
- Occupations: Academic personnel; Professor of the Faculty of Theology and Islamic Studies of University of Tehran; Professor of the Faculty of Letters and Humanities of the University of Tehran; Textual criticism; Literary researcher; Author
- Father: Mirza Mohammad Baqir Modarres Razavi
- Awards: Distinguished Professor, University of Tehran

Mohammad Taghi Modarres Razavi (Persian: محمدتقی مدرس رضوی), distinguished Professor of University of Tehran, was an Iranian Literary researcher and author. He was born in Mashhad, Razavi Khorasan Province, Iran on 18 March 1896, and died on 19 November 1986, in Tehran, Iran.

He was one of the teachers in Astan Quds Razavi and taught there for many years like his father Mirza Mohammad Baqir Modarres Razavi. In 1927, he joined the Ministry of Culture of Iran and taught literary sciences in Mashhad and Tehran. At the beginning of the establishment of the University of Tehran, he was elected as professor and taught in the Faculty of Theology and Islamic Studies and Faculty of Letters and Humanities there until he retired. In 1976, he chosen as distinguished professor at the University of Tehran.

== Genealogy and life ==
Mohammad Taghi Modarres Razavi was born in Mashhad, Razavi Khorasan province, Iran on 18 March 1896. His last name "Modarres" (means teacher in Persian) was related to teaching position of his family on Astan Quds Razavi, which was inherited from father to son in the family since the reign of Nader Shah Afshar. The word "Razavi" in his family name is also due to his ancestral relationship with Ali al-Rida. The genealogy of his family series is in the book "Shajareye Tayyebeh" written by Mirza Mohammad Baqir Modarres Razavi (his father) and this book has been republished with additions and comments by Mohammad Taghi. Mohammad Taghi's father, Mirza Mohammad Baqir Modarres Razavi, was born on 18 December 1853 and died on 12 July 1924 and buried in the Imam Reza shrine. Mohammad Taghi's father was a well-known man and famous people like Badiozzaman Forouzanfar chanted at his funeral. Mohammad Taghi's father, Mirza Mohammad Baqir, was a teacher of Fiqh and jurisprudence and did his teaching with interest and order. His class was less closed, scholars also attended his classes eagerly, and his field of study was one of the most populous in Mashhad.

== Educations and careers ==
Mohammad Taghi had already learned Persian and Arabic in childhood, so at the beginning he was accepted in the fourth grade of "Rahimieh" elementary school in Mashhad and was soon promoted to the fifth and sixth grades, and reached the seventh grade, which was the last school grade of that era. Because he inherited teaching from his father and learned the lessons well, when he was in the sixth grade, he taught arithmetic, Persian, syntax and grammar to the third grade students. Literary lessons were mostly taught in these schools and there were excellent teachers such as Adib Bojnourdi. A few years later, Mohammad Taghi attended Adib Bojnourdi's class and learned Theology from him.

As no higher class was opened in "Rahimieh" School, Mohammad Taghi left the school and began to search for literature teachers, finally he went to "Navvab" School in Mashhad. There he became a student of Abdul Javad Adib Neyshabouri who accepted the enthusiastic new student. After continuing his education at Nawab School, he became master in Arabic prosody and wrote several books in this field. Copies of his books on this subject are available in Astan Quds Razavi's library. Mohammad Taghi also studied algebra, geometry and four articles of Euclid with Mirza Abdul Rahman Modarres, a well-known teacher at the time.

While the famous scientist Seyed Hassan Meshkan Tabasi was in Mashhad, Mohammad Taghi studied the description of the poem with him for two months. After being watered from the source of literature and mathematics, Mohammad Taghi turned to learning the science of religion and learned jurisprudence and laws in Islamic principles from his father.

After that, he turned to philosophy and learned it from Mirza Askari who considered as one of the great men of wisdom and philosophy in Khorasan Province. He studied French with the encouragement of his father and traveled to Tehran in 1959 with his father's permission. In Tehran, he became a student of Mirza Mohammad Taher Tonekaboni and studied The Book of Healing and The Canon of Medicine of Avicenna with him and became a master in this field too. After that, to complete the French language skills and use the books of that language, he went to the French Alliance School and succeeded to learn French completely. After three years and a few months, he left Tehran for Mashhad, and after his father's death in 1924, he was given his position of teaching at Astan Quds Razavi, and he began teaching students in the fields he had learned before. Shortly afterwards, Mohammad Taghi was appointed by minister of time Mohammad Tadayon to teach at the "Danesh" School in Mashhad, which was the first high school in the city. After five years of teaching there, he came to Tehran and was appointed as a teacher and supervisor at Shahid Motahari University. At the same time, he taught Persian language in several schools includes Dar ul-Funun, Elmiyeh, Sherafat, and Marefat.

In 1938, Mohammad Taghi Modarres Razavi was appointed by minister of time Ali-Asghar Hekmat as Internal manager and teacher of Faculty of Theology and Islamic Studies of University of Tehran. Shortly afterwards, at the beginning of Esmail Merat ministry, the Faculty of Theology and Islamic Studies dissolved, so Mohammad Taghi was transferred to the Faculty of Literatures and Humanities of the University of Tehran. At the same time, by order of the Ministry of Education, he collaborated in preparation of Dehkhoda Dictionary and was engaged in this activity for two years. Until 1949, he served as teacher in University of Tehran, after which they gave him the rank of professor because he had ten years of teaching experience at the university. In May 1965, he retired but taught for two more years. In February 1977, he was awarded the title of Distinguished Professor by the University of Tehran.

== Death ==
He died on 19 November 1986, at the age of 91.

== Bibliography ==
- Ahval va Asare Khajeh Nasir al-Dine Toosi (title means Biography and works of Nasir al-Din al-Tusi)
- Tarikhe Rejale Khorasan (title means History of Khorasan men)
- Tarikhe Mashhad-e Razavi (title means History of Mashhad Razavi)
- Realeh ee dar Elme Orooz (title means A treatise on the Arabic prosody)
- Salshomare Vaqayeh-e Mashhad dar Gharnhaye Panjom ta Sizdahom (title means Calendar of events in Mashhad in the fifth to thirteenth centuries AH)
- Al-Allameh al-Khajeh Nasir al-Din al-Toosi: Hayat va Asareh (in Arabic) (title means Dignitary Nasir al-Din al-Tusi: Life and Works)
- Yadboude Haftsadomin Sale Khajeh Nasire Toosi (title means Commemoration of the seven hundredth year of Khajeh Nasir Tusi)
- Mashhad dar Aghaze Qarne Chehardahe Khorshidi (title means Mashhad at the beginning of the fourteenth solar century)

=== Textual criticism ===
Mohammad Taghi Modarres Razavi has made many efforts to correct, revive and reprint old Persian books. Some of his works in this field are:

- Shajareye Tayyebeh dar Ansabe Selseleye Saadaate Alavieh Razavieh by Mirza Mohammad Baqir Modarres Razavi (title means Pure family tree in the lineage of Sadat Alawieh Razavieh dynasty)
- Divan-e Hakim Abul Majde Majdud Ibne Adame Sanayi Ghaznavi (title means Diwan of Sanai)
- Hadiaq al Haqiqah va Shari al Tariqah by Sanai (title means The Walled Garden of Truth and Sharia of the way)
- Taliqate Hadiqat al Haqiqa (title means Suspensions of The Walled Garden of Truth)
- Montakhabe Hadiaq al Haqiqah va Shari al Tariqah (title means The selection of The Walled Garden of Truth and Sharia of the way)
- Masnavihaye Hakim Sanayi: Be Enzemame Sharhe Seir al-Ebad elal-Ma'ad (title means Masnavis of Hakim Sanai: including description of the Seir al-Ebad elal-Ma'ad)
- Al-Majam fi al-Ma'ayir-e al-Ash'ar-e al-Ajam by Shams Gheis Razi (title means Lexicon in the standards of Persian poetry)
- Tarikhe Bokhara by Mohammad Ibn Jafar Narshakhi (title means History of Bukhara)
- Asas al Eqtebas by Nasir al-Din al-Tusi (title means The basis of the derivation)
- Divane Anvari by Anvari (title means Diwan of Anvari)
- Sharhe Moshkelate Divane Anvari by Abu al-Hassan Hosseini Farahani (title means Explain difficult texts of Diwan of Anvari)
- Divane Seyyed Hassan Ghaznavi Molaqqab be Ashraf by Hassan Ghaznavi (title means Diwan of Sayyid Hassan Ghaznavi Nicknamed Ashraf)
- Tarjomeye Mizan al Kekmat by Al-Khazini (title means Translation of the balance of wisdom)
- Resaleye Asare Alavi by Al-Isfizari (title means A treatise on Atmospheric phenomena)
- Majmooeh Resaele Khajeh Nasir al-Din Toosi (title means Nasir al-Din al-Tusi's collection of essays)
- Mojmal al-Tavarikh by Abu al-Hassan Ibn Mohammad Amin Golestaneh (title means The Compendium of Histories)
- Tansoukh Nameye Ilkhani by Nasir al-Din al-Tusi (title means Rarity epistle (about jewelry and perfumes) of Ilkhanate)
- Karnameye Balkh by Sanai (title means The workbook of Balkh)
- Resaleye Bist Bab dar Marefate Ostorlab by Nasir al-Din al-Tusi (title means Twenty-chapter treatise on the knowledge of astrolabe)

== See also ==
- Mohammad Parvin Gonabadi
- Mohammad-Taqi Bahar
- Abbas Eqbal Ashtiani
- Mohammad Jafar Mahjoub
- Mohammad Ghazvini
- Mehdi Mohaghegh
- Karnameye Balkh
- Tariq ut-tahqiq
- Seir al-Ebad elal-Ma'ad
- Mohammad Ali Modarres Khiabani
