= Jalal al-Din Mirza Qajar =

Iranian historian and prince (1827–1872)

Jalal al-Din Mirza جلال الدین میرزا
- Portrait of Jalal al-Din Mirza Qajar
- Born: 1827; Tehran, Qajar Iran
- Died: 1872 (aged 46); Tehran, Qajar Iran
- Dynasty: Qajar
- Father: Fath-Ali Shah Qajar
- Mother: Homai Khanum
- Occupation: Historian and freethinker
- Writing career
- Language: Persian
- Notable works: Name-ye Khosrovan

Jalal al-Din Mirza (Persian: جلال‌الدین میرزا; 1827-1872) was an Iranian historian, philologist and freethinker, born in Tehran. He wrote a semi-historical book about the history of Iran called Name-ye Khosrovan, potentially one of the first comprehensive nationalistic works about the country.

== Biography ==
Jalal al-Din Mirza was born in 1827 at the court in Tehran, the capital of Qajar Iran. He was the fifty-fifth son of Fath-Ali Shah Qajar (r. 1797–1834). His mother was a Kurdish woman named Homai Khanum, from Mazandaran. During this period, Fath-Ali Shah Qajar, in the last years of his reign, had stepped down and devoted himself to a life of relaxation and creation of more offsprings. Being one of the last sons of Fath-Ali Shah meant that Jalal al-Din Mirza was a low-ranking member of the Qajar family, which made him insignificant in the affairs of the family. However, Jalal al-Din Mirza still had access to some benefits that the royal family enjoyed, particularly education. Part of his education included learning classical Persian literature and the French language.

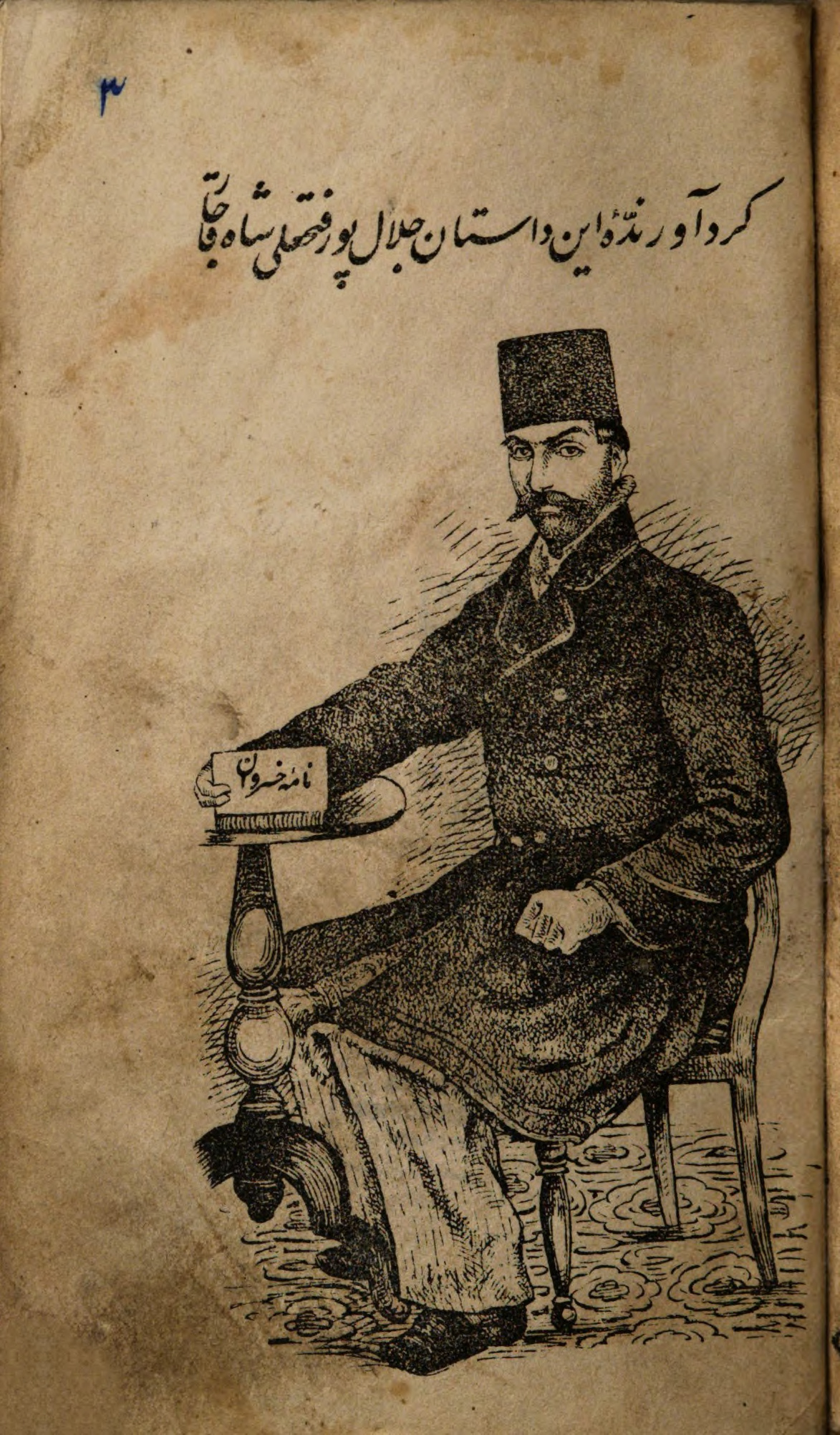
Illustration depicting Jalal al-Din Mirza from the Name-ye Khosrovan

Jalal al-Din Mirza, during the last years of life, wrote a semi-historical book about the history of Iran named Name-ye Khosrovan, potentially one of the first comprehensive nationalistic works about the country. The first volume was released in 1868, and dealt with the ancient history of Iran until the fall of the Sasanian Empire. The second volume (1870) covered the history of Iran in the Islamic era from the Tahirid dynasty till the fall of the Khwarazmshahs. The third volume (1871) dealt with the Mongol era to the Zand dynasty. Jalal al-Din Mirza had already become blind at the time of the issuance of the second volume, and had also contracted syphilis (which possibly played a role in his loss of eyesight). In 1872, he died at the age of 46.

== Sources ==
- Amanat, Abbas; Vejdani, Farzin (2008). "Jalāl-al-Din Mirzā". Encyclopaedia Iranica, Vol. XIV, Fasc. 4. pp. 405–410.
- Marashi, Afshin (2008), Nationalizing Iran: Culture, Power, and the State, 1870-1940, University of Washington Press, pp. 1–200, ISBN 9780295800615
- Vejdani, Farzin Vejdani (2014). Making History in Iran: Education, Nationalism, and Print Culture. Stanford University Press. pp. 1–288. ISBN 9780804792813.
