= Shaykh Sanan and the Christian maiden =

Persian mystical poem by Farid ud-Din Attar

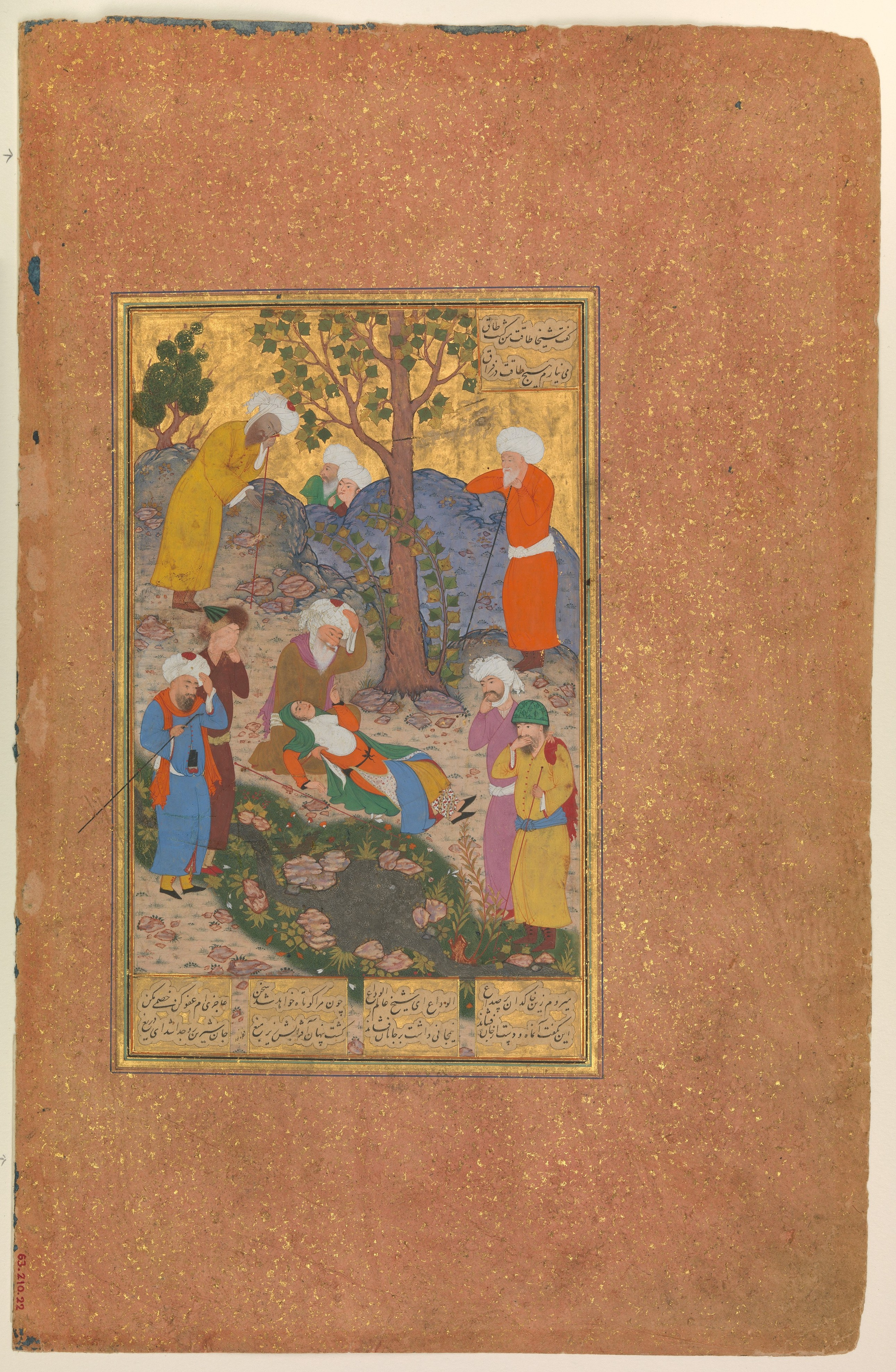
Shaikh Sanan and the Christian maiden, folio from a Safavid-era manuscript of Attar of Nishapur's Conference of the Birds, dated c. 1600

"Shaykh San'an and the Christian maiden" is a Persian mystical poem written by the Persian Sufi poet Farid ud-Din Attar. "Shaykh San'an" is the longest story in The Conference of the Birds.

== Synopsis ==
Shaykh Ṣanʿān, an old man, is highly devout and the leader of his people. He has lived by the Kaaba for about fifty years, accepting disciples and praying and fasting continuously. He has performed the Hajj fifty times and discovered many spiritual secrets.

One day, he has a dream that he is settled in Rum and bowing to an idol. This dream repeats over several consecutive nights. He travels to Rum with his disciples, where he meets a Christian woman and falls in love with her, spending over a month begging for her acceptance. The woman comes up with four conditions for the sheikh: bow to the idol, burn the Quran, start drinking wine and abandon the faith.

In addition to fulfilling these conditions, San'an shepherds her pigs for a year to pay the mahr. His disciples are disappointed and return to their homeland. A disciple who was not with him on the first trip travels to Rum, hoping to restore San'an, and spends forty days praying for him. Finally, the disciple sees the Prophet of Islam in a dream and receives the good news of San'an's return.

San'an is finally freed from the bondage of love. The woman also has a dream; she sees the sun fall beside her and it tells her to go with the shaykh. She travels to his homeland with him and becomes a Muslim.

== About poetry ==
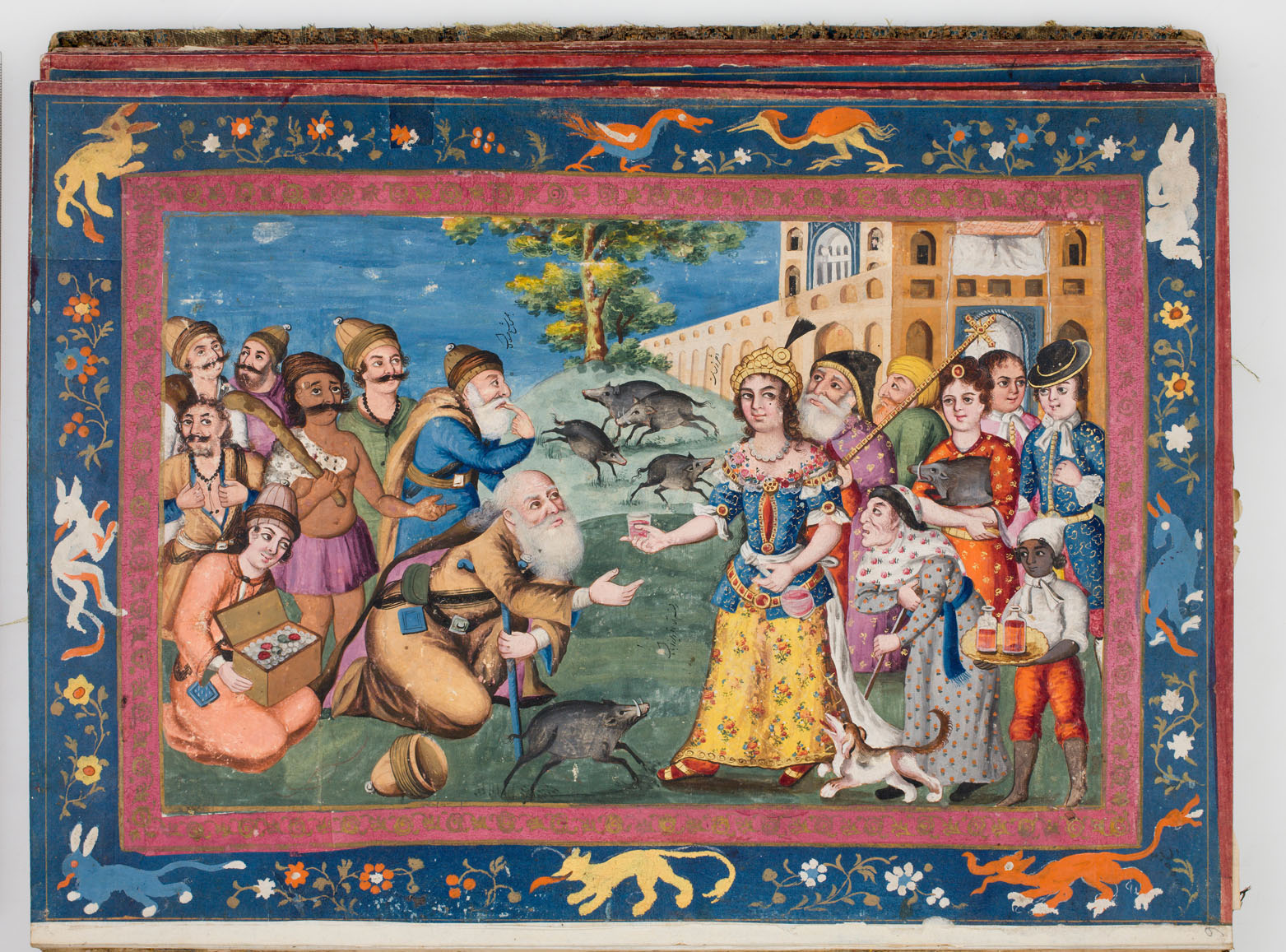
Shaykh San‘an and the Christian maiden, ascribed to Aqa Baqir and Mirza Baba. Created in Iran in the late 18th or early 19th century

Attar composed this story in an ordered form of 409 verses.

== Sample poem ==
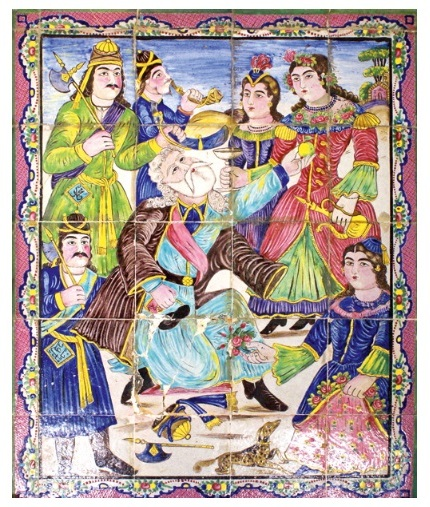
Tilework depicting the story of Shaykh Sanan and the Christian maiden. Created by Mirza Abd ol-Razzaq Faghfuri, dated 1936

These are verses from the story translated to English:

عشق دختر کرد غارت جان او

Translation:

The girl's love robbed him of his life.

کفر ریخت از زلف بر ایمان او

Translation:

Unbelief poured down from girl's hair on his faith.

...

عاشق آشفته فرمان کی برد

Translation:

The troubled lover never accepts advice.

درد درمان سوز درمان کی برد

Translation:

The pain that burns the treatment, how is it treated?

...

گفت این آتش چو حق درمن فکند

Translation:

The sheikh said, this fire makes me sick.

من به خود نتوانم از گردن فکند

Translation:

I can not get rid of it by myself.

== See also ==
- Karnameye Balkh
- Maghrebi Tabrizi
- Tariq ut-tahqiq
