= Tuhfat al-Iraqayn =

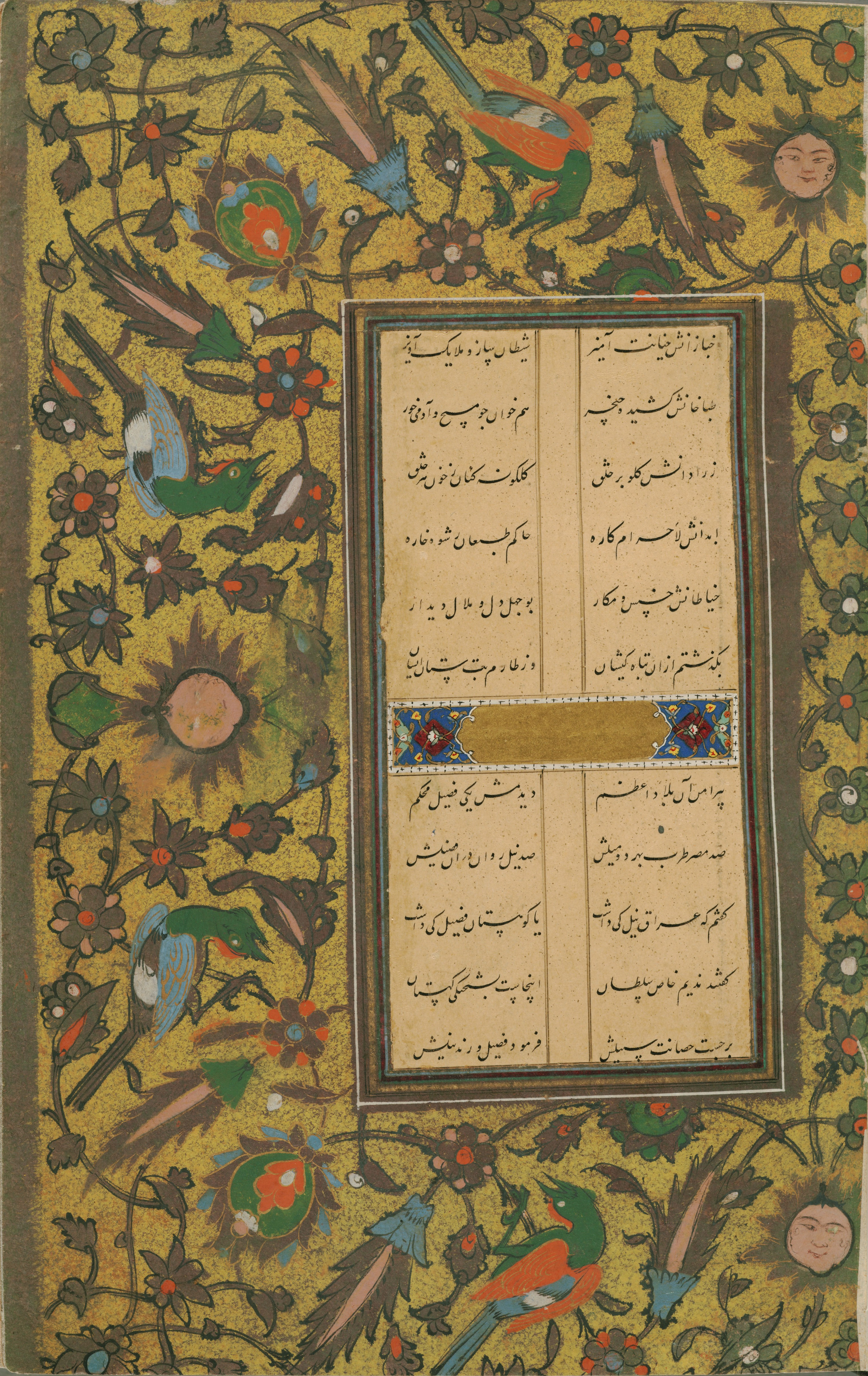
A leaf from the Tuḥfat al-ʿIrāqayn

Tuḥfat al-ʿIrāqayn (Arabic: تحفه العراقین “Gift of the Two Iraqs”), also known as Khatm al-gharāʾib (ختم الغرائب "Seal of Curiosity") is one of greatest works of the Persian poet Khaqani. After court intrigues, Khaqani set out on the Hajj to Mecca in 1156/57 CE, after which he composed this work. It consists of five parts and is essentially a description of the poet's travels. Its final version dates from 552/1157. Its name refers to the two traditional regions of Iraq, Upper Mesopotamia (al-Jazīra) and Lower Mesopotamia ("the Sawad)

Tuḥfat al-ʿIrāqayn is the only masnavi (long poem in rhyming couplets) written by this poet.
