= Name-ye Khosrowan =

Historical book on Iran by Jalal al-Din Mirza Qajar (1868–1872)

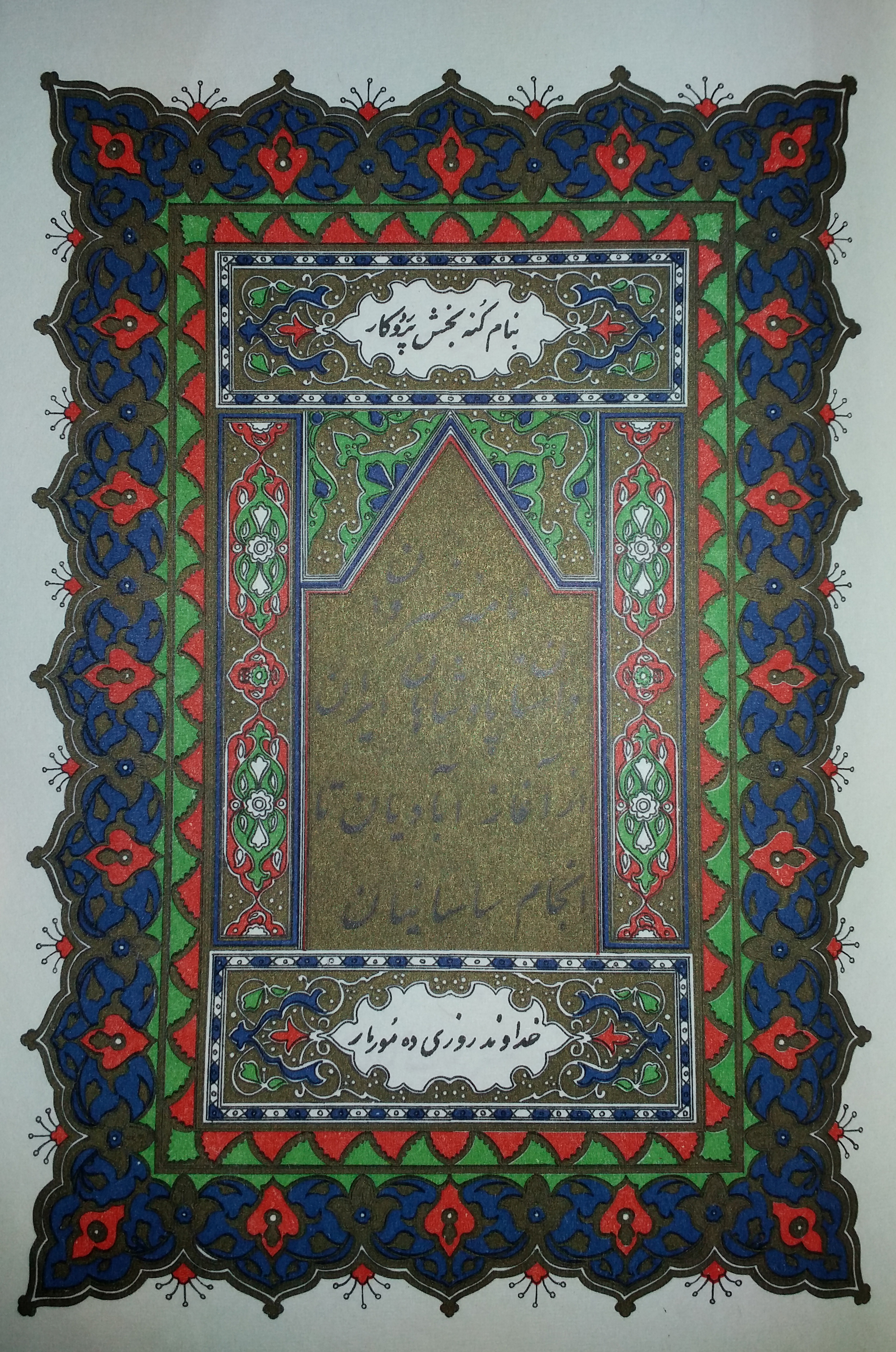
- First page of the book
- Author: Jalal al-Din Mirza Qajar
- Language: Persian
- Subject: History of Iran
- Publication place: Iran

Name-ye Khosrowan (Persian: نامهٔ خسروان, lit. 'Book of Khosrows/Kings') is a historical book about Iran (also known as Persia) written by the Qajar prince, Jalal al-Din Mirza Qajar between 1868 and 1872 CE. Name-ye Khosrowan includes the history of Iran from the ancient times to the Zand era in the 18th century.
