= Democracy in classical Iran =

Early Iranians had their own regional elected councils. By the time of the Medians, the city-states were administered in a democratic fashion.

During the Achaemenids, in a debate over the constitution of Iran, Otanes argued in favor of democracy, however he did not succeed. He enumerated five characteristic marks of the democracy: 1, an equality of rights for all; 2, the rejection of arbitrary power as ordinarily exercised by eastern princes; 3, appointment to offices by lot; 4, responsibility in office; 5, deliberation in common, and the framing of laws in popular assemblies.

By the time of Parthians, the appointment of kings was through election in the Parthian parliament, Megisthanes. In this way the king could be the representative of the whole nation.

== Early Iranians ==
Regional elected councils are well documented particularly in the Indo-Iranian societies.

Zoroaster's Gathas states that in order to bring peace, prosperity, stability, progress and happiness to the living world, people are to select only competent persons. Song 16 is particularly dedicated to "Vohû Khshathra Vairya," literally "Good Domain Worthy-of-Choice." It shows that an ideal government must be an elected one.

In its most sacred prayer the Ahunavar (Choice of the Lord), Zoroastrians are taught that their Lord and leader are to be chosen, through a Good Mind and only on account of their individual righteousness. This sets the basis for a spiritual and political democracy as far back as nearly four millennia ago.

Zoroaster, the Iranian prophet advised people to listen to all parties and to choose the best of them. He said (Yasna 30, paragraph 2) "O people, listen to others and accept the best of them, and consider them with a bright and deep thinking. Every man and woman should chose the path of good and bad by his/her own." He did not discriminate between man and woman in this regard and counted them equally. In Yasna 30, he said "hearken with your ears to these best counsels, Reflect upon them with illumined judgment. Let each one choose his creed with that freedom of choice each must have at great events. O ye, be awake to these, my announcements."

== Medes ==
Diodorus mentions that after the Assyrians had ruled Asia for five hundred years "they were conquered by the Medes, and thereafter no king arose for many generations to lay claim to supreme power, but the city-states, enjoying a regimen of their own, were administered in a democratic fashion".

Herodotus writes "After Assyrians had ruled upper Asia for five hundred and twenty years, the Medes were the first who began to revolt from them. These, it would seem, proved their bravery in fighting for freedom against the Assyrians; they cast off their slavery and won freedom. Afterwards, the other subject nations, too, did the same as the Medes. All of those on the mainland were now free men; but they came to be ruled by monarchs again, as I will now relate. There was among the Medes a clever man called Deioces: he was the son of Phraortes. Deioces was infatuated with sovereignty, and so he set about gaining it. Already a notable man in his own town (one of the many towns into which Media was divided), he began to profess and practice justice more constantly and zealously than ever, and he did this even though he knew that injustice is always the enemy of justice. Then the Medes of the same town, seeing his behavior, chose him to be their judge, and he (for he coveted sovereign power) was honest and just. By acting so, he won no small praise from his fellow townsmen, to such an extent that when the men of the other towns learned that Deioces alone gave fair judgments (having before suffered from unjust decisions), they came often and gladly to plead before Deioces; and at last they would submit to no arbitration but his. The number of those who came grew ever greater, for they heard that each case turned out in accord with the truth. Then Deioces seeing that everything now depend on him, would not sit in his former sear of judgment, and said he would give no more decisions; for it was of no advantage to him (he said) to leave his own business and spend all day judging the cases of his neighbors. This caused robbery and lawlessness to increase greatly in the towns; and, gathering together, the Medes conferred about their present affairs, and said (here, as IP suppose, the main speakers were Deioces' friends), 'since we cannot go on living in the present way in the land, come, let us set up a king over us; in this way the land will be well governed, and we ourselves shall attend to our business and not be routed by lawlessness.' With such words they persuaded themselves to be ruled by a king." So in this way people were electing their kings.

== Achaemenids ==
Herodotus puts great emphasis on the fact that the proposals put forward included the idea of establishing "democracy" in Persia. Herodotus in Histories gives an account on a debate over the constitution of Iran (Persia) in 522 BC, where Otanes argued in favor of democracy, the principle of equality before the law, and the accountable government. He advocates a complete democracy, on the grounds that under a democratic system "offices of state are exercised by lot".

In that session, Otanes also talked about the disadvantages of monarchy. He notes that democratic rule does not share any of the malice of a tyranny. Otanes was one of the seven members who overthrew Gaumata.

He recommended that the management of public affairs should be entrusted to the whole nation. He said, "it seems advisable, that we should no longer have a single man to rule over us. the rule of one is neither good nor pleasant... How indeed is it possible that monarchy should be a well-adjusted thing, when it allows a man to do as he likes without being answerable?... I vote, therefore, that we do away with monarchy, and raise the people to power. For the people are all in all."

Otanes seems to find democracy inherently more equitable: "the rule of many has first a name attaching to it which is the fairest of all names, that is to say 'Equality.'" Popular government ensures moderate rule, he suggests.

The book "The Archaic Smile of Herodotus" notes that "in arguing that democracy will be good for Persia, Otanes contradicts himself, for he proposes to change the traditional form of government. This violation of ancient custom is just the practice of which he accuses tyrants." However Otanes was advocating a return to the equality and democracy that was customary in ancient Persia. So violation of these customs was what he was accusing tyrants about. Perhaps Otanes considered democracy reflecting Persia's tribal roots.

Even though Otanes has not used the term demokratia in his speech, but his emphasis on equality under the law, elections by lot, and collective decisions makes it clear that he represents the democratic viewpoint. Some scholars have gone further by considering that not only Otanes was in fact advocating the democracy, but also "a pretty radical form of it".

Some scholars have tended to equate Otanes' arguments with those of the author himself (Herodotus). Others have titled Otanes as "the champion of democracy".

According to Aristotle the three parts of a politeia are the deliberative, the magistracies, and the judiciary. This tripartite structure of the politeia was a traditional idea; Aristotle only elaborated upon it. The threefold division is already evident in Otanes' defence of democracy, where he defends democracy for its virtues in all three areas.

From the viewpoint of the methodological approach, Otanes provided a "practical example" of Cambyses, that how he acted as a monarch in power. The moral force of Otanes' argument derives from his conviction that monarchy and oligarchy have proven untrustworthy, insofar as natural vanity is bound to corrupt even good individuals if left unchecked.

In addition to book 3, later in book 6 Herodotus once again insists that the account of the debate is historical, and he vents his spleen at those who deny that Otanes advised the Persians to demokrateesthai.

== Arsacids ==
At the time of Parthians, kings held absolute power over succession but were still greatly influenced by the Parthian parliament, Magistan (in Greek: Megisthanes). The parliament was of two parts: one of the wise men and magi from across the country, and the second the relatives of the royal family.

The two parts separately and together, formed three different councils. A third could be assembled, as the result of emergencies, comprising the members of two other councils. This council (comprising the two) was called the Megisthanes. Strabo writes that "the Council of the Parthians, according to Poseidonius, consists of two groups, one that of kinsmen, and the other that of wise men and Magi, from both of which groups the kings were appointed." The "wise men" in the parliament typically exceeded the magi.

Megisthanes was the first parliament of Iran. The first session of the Megisthanes parliament, was held in Nowruz of the year 137 BC, where Mithridates I personally attended the council. It can be concluded that the Parthian parliament was the result of the achievements of past civilizations specially the Achaemenids (whose royal courts were similar to the Parthian councils) and Greeks. Justin (41.2.2) proclaims this parliament a senate in Parthia. Tacitus states that the parliament was composed of 300 of the rich and wise men. The people had somewhat of a voice in the parliament. As long as the parliament and people had consensus, they the Parthian kings would have to respect their advice. However, with fracturing disagreements, council political parties could often form. Artabanus III's removal and reinstallation are an example of the council's power and show the role of the parliament in reinstating the king's power, or taking it away. Much of the aristocratic group in the council comprised the Seven Great Houses of Iran, continuing the Achaemenid tradition. This tradition would continue from the Achaemenid dynasty to the Sassanids as a key aspect of the court. Over the same provoke, in wake of eras there had appeared conflicting views towards its constituent structure and naming conventions. Some abstractive attempts have compared the bicameral congress of both ensembles with Majlis, while considering the ensemble of wise experienced men to be Mahestan, and the ensemble of royals and religious influentials as Moghestan.

The Parthian kingdom was not solely based on absolutism, but there was a parliament of sorts where important issues were being resolved discussed. While there is no concrete evidence for either an election of the king or a true separation of powers between the monarchy and the council, the dynamics of the royal court and the kings' necessity to please the Seven Great Houses of Iran guarantee that for the king to interfere with the council would have been a disastrous political move. Justin considers one of the reasons for the collapse of Parthian empire to be the power of this council and the extreme actions of its members.
