= Sanai =

12th-century Sufi poet

Sana'i Ghaznavi
- سنایی غزنوی
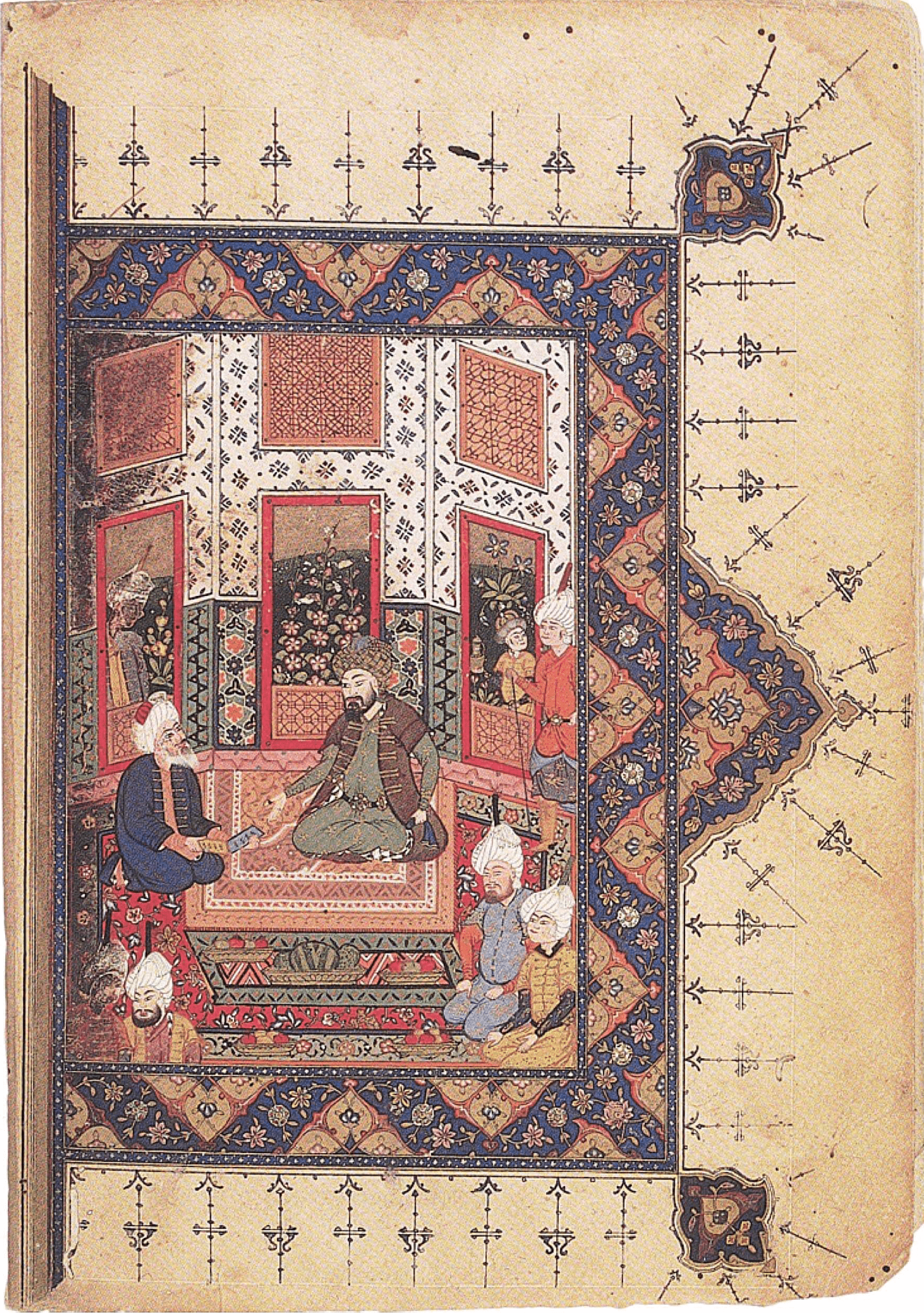
- "Hakim Sanai addressing the Sultan of Ghazna" Folio from Hadiqat al Haqiqa, dated 1579, Safavid-era miniature, currently in Leiden University
- Born: 1080; Ghazni, Ghaznavid Empire
- Died: 1131/1141; Ghazni, Ghaznavid Empire
- Occupation: Persian literature
- Writing career
- Genres: Sufi poetry, Wisdom Literature
- Notable work: The Walled Garden of Truth

Hakim Abul-Majd Majdūd ibn Ādam Sanā'ī Ghaznavi (Persian: حکیم ابوالمجد مجدود ‌بن آدم سنایی غزنوی), more commonly known as Sanai, was a renowned Iranian Sufi poet mystic from Ghazni. He is best known for his influential works The Walled Garden of Truth (Hadiqat al-Haqiqa) and The Divan. He is regarded as one of the pioneers of Persian Sufi poetry and had a major influence on later Iranian poets such as Attar and Rumi.

== Life ==
Sanai was an Iranian poet who lived in the late 11th and early 12th century and was associated with Ghazni. He was connected with the court of Bahram Shah. The details of Sanai’s personal life are not well documented, and much of his biography is based on later sources. His surviving poetry is the principal source for understanding his literary and religious ideas.

== Works ==
He wrote an enormous quantity of mystical verse, of which The Walled Garden of Truth or The Hadiqat al Haqiqa (حدیقه الحقیقه و شریعه الطریقه) is his master work and the first Persian mystical epic of Sufism. Dedicated to Bahram Shah, the work expresses the poet's ideas on God, love, philosophy and reason.

For almost 900 years The Walled Garden of Truth has been consistently read as a classic and employed as a Sufi textbook. According to John Stephenson, "Sanai’s fame has always rested on his Hadīqa; it is the best known and in the East by far the most esteemed of his works; it is in virtue of this work that he forms one of the great trio of Sūfi teachers — Sanā'ī, Attar, Jalālu d Dīn Rūmī." Sanai taught that lust, greed and emotional excitement stood between humankind and divine knowledge, which was the only true reality (haqq). Love (ishq) and a social conscience are for him the foundation of religion; mankind is asleep, living in a desolate world. To Sanai common religion was only habit and ritual.

Sanai's poetry had a tremendous influence upon Persian literature. He is considered the first poet to use the qasidah (ode), ghazal (lyric), and the masnavi (rhymed couplet) to express the philosophical, mystical and ethical ideas of Sufism.

== Influence and legacy ==
=== Poetic influence ===
Rumi acknowledged Sanai and Attar as his two great inspirations, saying, "Attar is the soul and Sanai its two eyes, I came after Sanai and Attar." The Walled Garden of Truth was also a model for Nizami's Makhzan al-Asrar (Treasury of Secrets).

=== Modern cultural references ===
Guillermo del Toro's 2017 film The Shape of Water ends with a recitation of one of Sanai's poems; Sanai is named in the closing credits.

Unable to perceive the shape of you, I find you all around me.
Your presence fills my eyes with your love.
It humbles my heart, for you are everywhere.

== Quotations ==
Sanai's poetry stresses the possibility of an "awakening." His means for this awakening is surrender to God. His poetry has been called "the essential fragrance of the path of love." He hits out at human hypocrisy and folly:

He who knows not his own soul,
How shall he know the soul of another?
And he who only knows hand and foot,
How shall he know the Godhead?

The prophets are unequal to understanding this matter;
Why dost thou foolishly claim to do so?
When thou hast brought forward a demonstration of this subject,
Then thou wilt know the pure essence of the faith;

Otherwise what have faith and thou in common?
Thou hadst best be silent, and speak not folly.
The learned talk nonsense all;
For true religion is not woven about the feet of everyone.

Others are heedless,—do thou be wise, and on this path keep thy tongue silent. The condition laid on such a one is that he should receive all food and drink from the Causer, not from the causes. Go, suffer hardship, if thou wouldst be cherished; and if not, be content with the road to Hell. None ever attained his object without enduring hardship.

== See also ==
- List of Persian poets and authors
- Persian literature
- Rumi
- Nizami Ganjavi
- Attar of Nishapur
- Notable Sanai researchers:
  - Mohammad-Reza Shafiei Kadkani
  - Mohammad Taghi Modarres Razavi
  - Mohammad Jafar Yahaghi
