= Mohammad Jafar Yahaghi =

Iranian writer (born 1947)

Mohammad-Jafar Yahaghi (Persian: محمدجعفر یاحقی; also Romanized as Mohammad-Ja’far Yāhaghghi; born 1947 in Ferdows, South Khorasan, Iran) is a celebrated Persian writer, literary critic, editor and translator and distinguished professor of literature at Ferdowsi University of Mashad. He is currently the head of Center of Excellence in Researches about Ferdowsi and Khorasan literature.

Mohammad-Jafar Yahaghi graduated from Tehran University in 1981 with a doctorate degree in Persian literature. He is known for his works on Shahnama and Iranian epic literature.

He has written, edited and translated more than 20 books. He lives in Mashhad.

== Quranic Dictionary ==
Mohammad-Ja'far Yahaghi is the lead compiler of the Quranic Dictionary: A Dictionary of Persian Equivalents for Quranic Terms Based on 142 Manuscripts of the Quran Held in the Library of Astan Quds Razavi. This Dictionary contains over 190,000 Persian equivalents for Arabic Quranic terms, derived from 1,561 root words. In an article titled "The Death of Christ in Quranic Translations Until the 12th Century CE," based on the translations included in this Dictionary, Seyed Hossein Morakabi demonstrates that in the early Persian translations of the Quran, up until the 6th century AH (12th century CE), the crucifixion and death of Christ were acknowledged by Persian translators of the Quran. However, in later periods, likely due to the increasing theological differences between Muslims and Christians, the translations appear to have been modified to deny the crucifixion of Christ.
