= University of Tehran Press =

Iranian academic publisher

- Parent company: University of Tehran
- Founded: 1957
- Founder: Parviz Natel Khanlari
- Headquarters location: Tehran, Iran
- Key people: Mohammad Musakhani
- Publication types: Academic publishing
- Official website: press.ut.ac.ir

University of Tehran Press (UTP) (Persian: مؤسسه انتشارات دانشگاه تهران; Muasasah-je Intišarat-e Danešgah-e Tehran) is a publishing house and a department of the University of Tehran in Iran founded in 1957.

The press has published more than 5,000 titles in Persian language, and is currently publishing an average of one book per day.

== Book series ==
- Publications de l'Université de Tehran
- Tehran University Publications
