= Matigan-i Hazar Datistan =

The Matigan-i Hazar Datistan was the judicial code of the Magistan (Megisthanes), the imperial parliament of the Arsacid Empire (150 BCE–226 CE) and, for a while, of the Sassanid Empire (226–650 CE).

The Matigan-i Hazar Datistan was a compilation of the social, moral, civil and criminal laws of the time. Although the name suggests a thousand chapters or laws (Hazar: thousand), it is not known whether the code really had that many, and may simply mean 'a significant number'.

A considerable portion of the code has been lost.
