= Religio-Political Currents and Organizations in Iran =

2001 Persian book by Rasul Jafarian

Religio-political currents and organizations in Iran
- Author: Rasul Jafarian
- Original title: جریان‌ها و سازمان‌های مذهبی - سیاسی ایران (از روی کارآمدن محمدرضا شاه تا پیروزی انقلاب اسلامی) سال‌های ۱۳۲۰ - ۱۳۵۷
- Language: Persian
- Series: 1 volume
- Subject: Political parties of Iran; Islamic movements
- Genre: History; Politics
- Publisher: Publishing Center of Research Institute for Islamic Culture and Thought; Iranian Book and Literature Home; Elm; Islamic Revolution Document Center
- Publication date: 2001
- Publication place: Iran
- Pages: 1424 (first edition)

The Religio-political currents and organizations in Iran (Persian: جریان‌ها و سازمان‌های مذهبی سیاسی ایران) is a Persian book by the Iranian author, Rasul Jafarian. The book describes the cultural and political events of Iran from the time of Mohammad Reza Pahlavi to the victory of the Islamic Revolution (1941 to 1979). More than 65 explanatory and critical notes have been written on this book. In the third edition of this book Ali Khamenei, Supreme Leader of Iran, wrote a note on the book's chapter that had written about Ali Shariati (an Iranian revolutionary and sociologist). The book has been reprinted over twenty times.

== Subject ==
In this book, the author Rasul Jafarian, emphasizes the entry of clerics into the centers of Iran revolution struggle and their role by relying on religion in the field of culture and then politics. In the present book, he seeks to find an answer to the secret of the leadership of the clergy in Iranian Revolution in February 1979; Therefore, he argues about the root causes and how the clerical religious forces are in the leadership position of the Islamic revolution movement.

== Structure ==
The book "Religio-political currents and organizations in Iran (From the arrival of Mohammad Reza Shah to the victory of the Islamic Revolution (1941 to 1979))", is written in an introduction and eight general chapters. These chapters are:

- Chapter One: The Return of Religion to Society and Politics fields
- Chapter Two: The Movement for Translating Social-Political Works of Arabic-Brotherhood into Persian
- Chapter Three: Active religious-political currents in the 1960s and early 1970s
- Chapter Four: Revolutionary Islam of the Mojahedine Khalq Organization
- Chapter Five: Hosseiniyeh Ershad and Dr. Shariati
- Chapter Six: Religio-political active groups and currents on the eve of the victory of the Islamic Revolution of Iran
- Chapter Seven: Prominent authors of religio-political works on the eve of the Islamic Revolution of Iran
- Chapter Eight: Revisionist currents in Shiite beliefs

== Critique and review ==
The book "Religio-political currents and organizations in Iran (From the arrival of Mohammad Reza Shah to the victory of the Islamic Revolution (1941 to 1979))" has been reported, analyzed, reviewed and criticized several times so far.

== See also ==
- Atlas of Shia
- The specialized library on Islam and Iran
- Bibliography of Rasul Jafarian
- History of Islamic Iran
- Political History of Islam
- The intellectual and political life of Shia Imams
- Reflection on the Ashura movement
