= Bibliography of Rasul Jafarian =

Iranian author bibliography

Rasul Jafarian bibliography
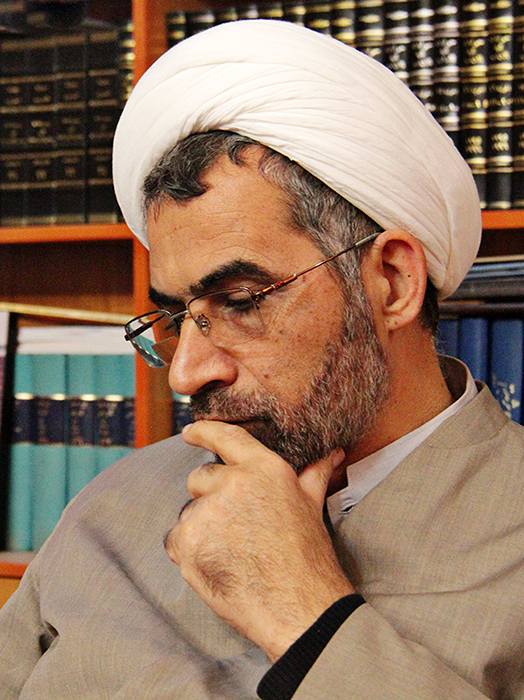
- Picture of Rasul Jafarian
- Books↙: more than 90
- Articles↙: 625 Persian; 45 Arabic
- Translations↙: 7

Bibliography of Rasul Jafarian is a list of books published by Rasul Jafarian (born 1964), cleric, translator, writer and researcher of Iranian history.

Jafarian is an Iranian prolific writer and has many works in the science of history. He started writing in 1985 with a book entitled An Introduction to the History of Islam. He has authored more than 90 books, some of which are in large numbers; for example, his book entitled Historical essays has been republished in more than 20 volumes.

Jafarian's works also succeeded in gaining honors; for example, the book Atlas of Shia (Persian: اطلس شیعه) was selected for Iran's Book of the Year Awards and won the Jalal Al-e Ahmad Literary Awards and the Farabi International Award. What makes his work even more important is the translation of his books into other languages such as English, Arabic and Urdu.

Some of his works are among the academic course resources and the resources of master and doctorate in history field.

Jafarian's main research is on the history of Shiism, but he has also done a lot of research in fields such as the political history of the beginning of Islam and the history of the Safavid period. He has also published numerous researches and articles on the history of Iranian pilgrimage to Hajj.

== Works ==
Jafarian's works are divided into three general sections:

- Books
- Travelogues
- Translations

=== Books ===
Books
Row	Title	Year of publication	Publisher	Description	Citation
1	An Introduction to the History of Islam	1985	Dar Rahe Haq	It was Jafarian's first book, which later became part of the introduction of the book Political History of Islam.	
2	Western mentality in the contemporary history of Iran	1986	University of Isfahan, Department of Islamic Culture and Education		
3	The falsification of the distortion of the Quran	1986	International Section of Islamic Development Organization	In this work, the issue of distorting the Qur'an and quoting it to the Shiites has been raised and criticized.	
4	A brief study on the relationship between Shiism and Iran	1986	Isfahan	Jafarian's first work on Shi'ism, which sought to answer the question: Is Shi'ism an Iranian religion or not?	
5	Basic introductory to research methods in history	1987	Islamic Development Organization	In the introduction of this book, important issues in historiography as well as historiography of Islamic history are discussed; For example: "Compilation of history", "Compilation of history and Shia"	
6	A review of the intellectual contexts of the new eclecticism in Iran	1988	Islamic Development Organization		
7	Evaluation of intellectual relations between Shahid Motahari and Dr. Ali Shariati	1989	Tehran Seda	The pretext for writing this book was a letter that Motahhari and Bazargan shared in 1978 about Shariati's thoughts. At the time, Motahhari was opposed to Shariati, but the atmosphere required a moderate talk about both the importance of his thoughts and his objections.	
8	History of Shiism in Iran History of the seventh century AH	1989	Islamic Development Organization	This book is a research on the growth and development of the Shiite school in Iran	
9	An introduction to the history of compiling hadith	1989	Fuad		
10	The intellectual and political life of Shia Imams	1990	Islamic Development Organization	This book was first published in two volumes. It was published in 2012 as an excerpt from the political life and thought of Shiite Imams by Maaref Publishing as an academic textbook.	
11	History of Islam and Iran until the end of the fourth century AH	1991	Amouzesh va Parvaresh	This book was taught as a second year textbook for general secondary education in Iran, and those books changed when the high school education system changed.	
12	Religion and politics in the Safavid period	1991	Ansarian	This book was later published in three volumes as Safavid in the Age of Religion, Culture and Politics by the seminary and university research institute. Then, with many additions, it was published in two thicker volumes by Elm publication as Religion and politics in the Safavid era.	
13	Storytellers in the History of Islam	1991	Fuad	An overview of storytelling, its dimensions and lines in the history of Iran and Islam	
14	The Struggle between Tradition and Modernity	1992	Raouf		
15	Reference, History and Thought	1992	Khorram		
16	The idea of religious understanding in the sixth and seventh centuries AH	1992	Islamic Development Office		
17	Study and research in the Iranian constitutional movement	1992	Toos	This book was written about the sit-in at the British embassy and was entitled British Involvement in the Constitution, which was published in 1992 under the name of Investigation and Research in the Iranian Constitutional Movement by Toos Qom Publications.	
18	History of the spread of Shiism in Rey	1992	Mash'ar	Part of a research project on Shiism that was exclusively dedicated to the city of Rey and was later included in Shiite history.	
19	The treatise of the king of medicine	1992	Marashi Library		
20	Historical and human geography of Shiites in the Islamic world	1992	Ansarian	It was part of the Shiite History Project, which looked at Shiite human and historical geography	
21	Causes of the fall of the Safavids	1993	Islamic Development Organization	This was Rasool Jafarian's second collection of articles on Safavids. He had previously published religion and politics in the Safavid period.	
22	Cultural relations between Mu'tazilites and Shiites	1993	Islamic Development Organization	It was an article written for the International Congress of Sheikh Mofid, which was held in 1413 AH and 1371 SH. It was later published independently.	
23	Friday Prayer, Historical Backgrounds and Bibliographic Awareness	1993	Friday Prayers Imams Policy Council	It is a bibliography compiled for the Secretariat of the Friday Imams.	
24	History of the Transformation of the Government and the Caliphate from the Rise of Islam to the Fall of the Sufyanian	1994	Islamic Development Office		
25	Treatise on the biography of Mirza Shirazi	1994	Amirkabir		
26	Ali ibn Isa Arbali and the Kashf al-Ghumma	1994	Islamic Research Foundation		
27	Islamic works of Mecca and Medina	1994	Mash'ar	This book was written for the representative office of the Supreme Leader in the Hajj Organization and for the use of clerics and administrators, and it was always their exam book for dispatch. Many of the specific researches are local and a significant number of its images have been prepared by Rasul Jafarian.	
28	Insight for the purpose of creation, Fazil Hindi	1995	Ansarian		
29	Biography of Bahauddin Mohammad Isfahani	1995	Ansarian	In the year that this work was published, a center was established in the Takht-e Foulad of Isfahan for the construction of that cemetery. They were also supposed to build the tomb of Fazil Hindi. So Jafarian published this biography along with several other treatises about him.	
30	Political History of Islam	1995	Ministry of Culture and Islamic Guidance/ Dalile Ma	It is a two-volume collection, the first volume of which is entitled "The Life of the Messenger of God" in 700 pages and the second volume is entitled "The Life of the Caliphs" in 827 pages. This book has been translated into English, Arabic and Urdu.	
31	Historical Articles (20 volumes)	From 1996 to 2011	Alhadi/ Dalile Ma	Six volumes of this twenty-volume collection were published from 1996 to 1999 by Alhadi Publications and the remaining volumes from 2008 to 2011 by Dalile Ma Publications.	
32	Search sequence on Shiite history in Iran	1996	Ansarian	Jafarian published the additions to the book "History of Shiism" under the title of this book.	
33	Sources of Islamic History	1997	Ansarian	This book has been used for many years as a textbook as well as a source for studying master's and doctoral exams.	
34	Shariati and the Clergy with a few other articles	1997	Ansarian		
35	History of Islamic Iran	1998	Andisheh Moaser	This collection was published in four volumes. The first volume is from the beginning of Islam to Islamic Iran, the second volume is from the beginning of the Tahirid dynasty to the end of the Khwarazmian dynasty, the third volume is from the Mongol conquest of the Khwarazmian Empire to the decline of the Turkmens and the fourth volume is about the Safavid dynasty (from the beginning to the decline).	
36	The role of the Karaki family in the establishment and continuation of the Safavid state	1999	Elm		
37	Constitutionalist closure at British embassy	1999	Institute for Iranian Contemporary Historical Studies	It is a book about the developments of the one-month sit-in of the constitutionalists at the British Embassy in Jamadi Al-Awali and Jamadi Al-Thani in 1324 AH.	
38	An Analysis of Intellectual and Political Developments after the Messenger of God	2000	Supreme Leader Representation in Universities	The text of some of Jafarian's speeches on why Ali ibn Abi Talib did not become the Imamate after the death of Muhammad ibn Abdullah	
39	The Virtues of Ali Ibn Abi Talib and the guardianship	2000	Dalil	A summary of the original book done by Zahabi	
40	Shiite community of Nakhvaleh in Medina	2000	Dalil		
41	Safavids in the field of religion, culture and politics	2000	Research Institute of Hawzeh and University	The basis of this book is "The Book of Religion and Politics in the Safavid Period, and the Causes of the Fall of the Safavids".	
42	History and political life of Amir al-Mu'minin Ali ibn Abi Talib	2001	Dalil	The "Imam Ali" section of the "Book of Political History of Islam during the Caliphate", as well as several other articles about Ali ibn Abi Talib, are included in this book.	
43	Articles about Hijab	2001	Dalil	Contains 33 treatises and several speeches published in two volumes	
44	Reflection on the Ashura movement	2001	Ansarian	The "Imam Hussein" section of the "Book" of the "Political History of Islam", in addition to the later articles written by Rasul Jafarian, is included in this work. Later, a new edition was published with corrections and additions by Elm Publishing.	
45	Sultan Muhammad Khodabandeh "Öljaitü" and Imami Shiism in Iran	2001	Specialized library on Islam and Iran	This book was part of the Jafarian Shiite History Project; Because Öljaitü was the first official king of Iran to adopt the Imami religion.	
46	Religio-political currents and organizations in Iran	2001	Islamic Sciences and Culture Academy/ Islamic Revolution Document Center/ Iranian Book and Literature Home/ Elm	The most important feature of this book is that it deals more with the cultural history of this period than the political history	
47	A Review of the Role of Ulama in the Iranian Constitutional Revolution	2002	Headquarter agency of the Supreme Leader in the IRGC		
48	Haj Mehdi Seraj Ansari, a shining star in the religious press	2003	Tehran		
49	Assadollah Kharghani, a modernist cleric of the constitutional era	2003	Islamic Revolution Document Center		
50	History of Shiism in Jorjan and Astarabad	2004	Islamic Research Foundation of Astane Quds Razavi	This was part of the Shiite History Project, which was published independently and later included in Shiite History.	
51	New discoveries about the Safavid era	2004	Center for the Study and Research of Religions and Beliefs	A collection of articles about Safavids and reasons for the fall of Safavids and about religion in this era... It was later published in three volumes in this book.	
52	The Story of Hijab in Iran Before the Revolution	2004	Islamic Revolution Document Center	This book is a report on a series of issues that arose about the hijab before the revolution.	
53	Sun of Jey	2005	City Council of Khvorasgan	Collection of articles about the Jey area	
54	An Urban Understanding of the Constitution Comparing the Constituency of Tabriz and Isfahan	2006	Institute for Iranian Contemporary Historical Studies	The original book was an article of the same name for the 100th anniversary of the Constitution at Cambridge University, in which Jafarian also spoke. It later became a book. In addition, several other articles were attached to this book.	
55	Footnotes to the book "The Shiites" by Heinz Halm	2006	Markaze Adyan		
56	A Reflection on Prophetic biography	2006	Publishers Cooperative	The first part of the "History of Islamic Iran" was a four-volume book that was published independently and for presentation at the Iran book fair.	
57	Rereading the Constitutional Movement	2007	Motahhar	This book is taken from Jafarian's lectures on the constitution.	
58	Shiism in Iraq, authority and Iran	2007	Institute for Iranian Contemporary Historical Studies	The book was written in the wake of the US invasion of Iraq and the inauguration of a new government. (History of Shiism in Iraq, Authority in Recent Decades, and Developments in 2003)	
59	Atlas of Shia	2008	Geographical Organization of the Army of the Islamic Republic	This work has been compiled on the recommendation of Ali Khamenei and on the order of National Geography Organization of Iran. The main purpose of this work is to present a geographical-historical picture of the Shiites throughout the history of Islam from the beginning to the present day.	
60	False Mahdians	2012	Elm		
61	Selection of the political and intellectual life of Shiite Imams	2012	Ma'aref	Summarized for teaching in universities	
62	Theory of connecting the Safavid state with the Sahib al-Zaman government	2012	Elm	This book has two parts, the first part is historical examples of the comments about the connection of the Safavid Empire with the Mahdi state (the twelfth Imam of the Shiites) and the second part is the treatise entitled "Resaleye Sharh Hadith Dolatana" from the period of Tahmasp, in which it is said that Tahmasp government will be connected to Mahdi.	
63	Negar and Negareh	2013	Elm		
64	Historical Articles and Essays (9 volumes)	From 2013 to 2020	Elm	In each volume of this collection, several historical articles and treatises have been written.	
65	Comprehensive Introduction	2013	Elm	Contains 277 introductions to books published by Parliament	
66	Articles on the Concept of Science in Islamic Civilization	2014	Elm	This book is the result of articles written by Jafarian from 2011 to 2014.	
67	History of the Caliphs and the Murder story of Imam Hussein	2014	Elm	A text story from the history of the beginning of Islam and Husayn ibn Ali	
68	Muslim-Christian Debate	2015	Elm	Book Review of Meshkate Sedq	
69	Friendly correspondence between Dr. Seyed Hossein Modarresi Tabatabai and Rasul Jafarian	2015	Movarrekh	A collection of emails sent to each other over a ten-year period from 2005 to 2015.	
70	Kelk and the book	2015	Movarrekh	It is a collection of notes, conversations and articles written by Jafarian during his four years as director of the Parliamentary Library.	
71	History of Shiism in Iran from the beginning to the end of the ninth century AH	2016	Elm	This collection is two volumes.	
72	From Darband to Qatif	2016	Elm	A report on Islamic, Christian debates of the Safavid dynasty and Qajar dynasty	
73	History of Safavid Qizilbash in some historical-religious texts of the Ottoman Empire	2017	Movarrekh	This book reports several new texts about the Safavids. Two of them are two manuscripts written about the Qizilbash, and their point of view is to critique the Qizilbash religiously and also to express their historical roots. In the continuation of Safavid history, it has been reported from several texts from the Arabic histories of the tenth and eleventh centuries AH.	
74	Application of story-history in religious propaganda of Mazandaran in the ninth century AH	2018	Movarrekh		
75	An Experience of Scientific-Religious Discourse in the Knowledge of the Atmosphere or Atmospheric Phenomena in Islamic Civilization	2018	Movarrekh	This book has tried to provide aspects of this discussion as an experience of scientific-religious discourse in the knowledge of atmospheric phenomena to those interested in the Islamicization of science.	
76	The evolution of the concept of science in hadith, literary, theological and philosophical texts	2019	Movarrekh		
77	From Devil to Microbe	2019	Movarrekh	This book can be divided into two general sections; The first part is a detailed introduction entitled "Medical backwardness in the shadow of Islamic hygiene" and the second part of the book includes five texts in the field of "Islamic hygiene".	
78	Mullah Aghaye Darbandi and Maqtal writing	2019	Movarrekh	This book is dedicated to the biography and opinions of Mullah Aghaye Darbandi.	
79	Mohammad Taqi Danesh Pajouh at the University of Tehran	2019	Movarrekh	The book was unveiled during the commemoration ceremony of Mohammad Taqi Danesh Pajouh.	
80	Ali Akbar Hakamizadeh in four scenes	2019	Movarrekh		
81	We have never taken science seriously	2020	Research Institute for Cultural and Social Studies of the Ministry of Science	A collection of ten years of Rasul Jafarian's notes on science and its margins has been collected in this book.	
82	On the wings of angels	2020	Elm	Includes 29 articles in the field of Hajj and Pilgrimage	

* All books are in Persian and their titles have been translated for convenience.

=== Travelogues ===
Travelogues
Row	Title	Year of publication	Publisher	Description	Citation
1	With Ibrahim's caravan	1992	Mash'ar	A report on the Hajj of 1992 by Rasul Jafarian.	
2	With the caravan of love	1993	Mash'ar	A report on the Hajj of 1993 by Rasul Jafarian.	
3	Towards Umm Al Qura (Four Hajj Travelogues)	1994	Mash'ar	This was the first collection of travelogues published by Jafarian. The first of those travels was from him, which was published as an appendix to three other travelogues that also had a large volume.	
4	Travelogue of Mecca in 1996	1996	Mirase Eslami	A report on the Hajj of 1996 by Rasul Jafarian.	
5	With Safa Caravan	2003	Mash'ar	A report on the 2003 Hajj by Rasul Jafarian.	
6	The way of Hajj	2010	Geographical Organization of the Ministry of Defense of Iran	This work was about the path of Hajj based on travelogues that Jafarian had previously written. Different routes, sea and land. Iraq, Istanbul, India and...	
7	Fifty Qajar Hajj Travelogues	2014	Elm	It is a collection of eight volumes that has been published about Iranian Hajj pilgrimage in the Qajar period.	
8	Remember of the friend and the land	2014	Movarrekh	It is a collection of twenty travelogues to Saudi Arabia, nineteen of which were for Umrah and Hajj.	

* All books are in Persian and their titles have been translated for convenience.

=== Translations ===
Translations
Row	Title	Year of publication	Publisher	Author	Citation
1	History of Mecca	2006	Mash'ar	Ahmad Al-Sabaee	
2	Tohfatol Haramein	2004	Miqat	Yusuf Nabi	
3	Shiism in Andalusia	1997	Ansarian	Mahmoud Mekki, Izzedine Umar Musa	
4	Ottoman government from authority to dissolution	2000	Office of Cooperation between the seminary and the university	Esmaeel Ahmad Yaqi	
5	Abbasid Caliphate and Fatimid Caliphate rivalry in sovereignty over the two holy shrines	2006	Mash'ar	Soleiman Alkhrabsheh	
6	Ibn Tawus Library	1992	Marashi Library	Etan Gulberg	
7	Shiite written heritage from the first three centuries AH	2004	Specialized library on Islam and Iran	Hossein Modarressi	

* All books are in Persian and their titles have been translated for convenience.

== See also ==
- Morteza Motahhari bibliography
