= Namira (book) =

Persian book about Ashura (Islamic event)

- Author: Sadegh Karamyar
- Original title: نامیرا
- Language: Persian
- Subject: Battle of Karbala
- Genre: Novel; Fiction; History; Religion
- Publisher: Neyestan
- Publication date: 2009
- Publication place: Iran
- Pages: 336
- Awards: • Jalal Al-e Ahmad Literary Awards • Top Religion and Research Books (an Iranian book festival) • Iran's Book of the Year Awards

Namira (means Immortal, Persian: نامیرا) is a novel in Persian language by Sadegh Karamyar. Its story is based on the Battle of Karbala. The book has been published by Neyestan Publications in Iran.

== Author ==
Sadegh Karamyar is an Iranian writer and film director. He was born in 1959 in Tehran, Iran. Karamyar was in charge of the special magazine called "Information of the Front" (Persian: اطلاعات جبهه) in the Iran–Iraq War zones from 1986 to 1988, and from 1993 to 1996 he was in charge of the literary page "Sprouts of Thought" (Persian: جوانه‌های اندیشه) of the Ettela'at newspaper and also the deputy editor of the film magazine called "People and Cinema" (Persian: مردم و سینما) affiliated to the Farabi Cinema Foundation. Karamyar is known in Iran for writing novels such as "Namira" (Persian: نامیرا) and "Burning Plains" (Persian: دشت‌های سوزان) as well as directing series such as "The Day Before" (Persian: یک روز قبل) and "The Memoirs of an Unfinished Man" (Persian: خاطرات یک مرد ناتمام). He has a first-class artistic certificate from the Ministry of Culture and Islamic Guidance of Iran, has written several novels, screenplays and has directed several films and TV series. One of the Karmiyar's other activities in the cultural field is the literary and artistic management of Tehran Municipality Cultural and Artistic Organization for more than five years.

== Theme ==
The main core of the Namira story, is the process of joining a man from the tribe of Bani Kalb named Abdullah ibn Umayr Abu Wahab to the army of Husayn ibn Ali in Battle of Karbala. The book is a simple narrative that starts from the situation of city Kufa and reaches the Battle of Karbala.

The Namira story expression is fluent and in modern language so as to create intimacy that attracts the audience. The author has used the singular third person or the omniscient personality to tell the story.

== Awards ==
The book Namira has been recognized as a book worthy of appreciation in the third period of Jalal Al-e Ahmad Literary Awards, which is considered the most expensive literary award in Iran, in 2009. The book was also introduced as the selected work of the fourth festival of "Top Religion and Research Books" (an Iranian book festival).

According to Mehr News Agency, the fourth period of Rushana study campaign started with the novel Namira written by Sadegh Karamyar.

The book Namira, also selected as Worthy of appreciation in the 28th Iran's Book of the Year Awards in 2009.

Excerpts from this book were published in the form of an animation called Namira.

The book Namira has been reprinted 33 times so far.

== See also ==
- Battle of Karbala
- Maqtal al-Husayn
- Abu Mikhnaf
- Reflection on the Ashura movement
- The intellectual and political life of Shia Imams
