= History of Islamic Iran =

Book about history of Islam in Iran in Persian language

- Author: Rasul Jafarian
- Original title: تاریخ ایران اسلامی
- Language: Persian language
- Series: 4 volumes
- Subject: Islam in the history of Iran
- Publication date: 1998
- Publication place: Iran
- Pages: In Persian edition: First volume: 354; Second volume: 384; Third volume: 352; Fourth volume: 468

History of Islamic Iran (Persian: تاریخ ایران اسلامی) is a four-volume book collection written by Rasul Jafarian in Persian language. In this collection, Jafarian writes the history of Iran from the advent of Islam to the decline of the Safavid Empire. This book has been introduced as one of the master's degree resources in the field of history and Persian literature in Iran.

== Structure and content ==
The History of Islamic Iran book collection has been published in four volumes. The structure and table of contents of this collection are as follows:

First volume: From the origin of Islam to Islamic Iran

- Introduction
- The rise of Islam
- The first caliphate
- Umayyad dynasty
- Abbasid Caliphate

Second volume: From the advent of Tahirid dynasty to the decline of Khwarazmian dynasty

- Iran on a new path: Tahirid dynasty
- Saffarid dynasty
- Samanid dynasty
- Alid dynasties of Tabaristan
- Ziyarid dynasty
- Buyid dynasty
- Islamic civilization and the share of Iran
- Ghaznavids
- Seljuk dynasty
- Alamut state
- Iran in the sixth century AH
- Khwarazmian dynasty

Third volume: From the Mongol conquest to the decline of Turkoman

- From the Mongol conquest to the establishment of the Ilkhanate state
- Ilkhanate
- Local governments in the eighth and ninth centuries AH
- Sarbadars
- Mar'ashis
- Muzaffarids in Fars, Isfahan and Kerman
- Jalayirid Sultanate
- The invasion of Timur and the establishment of the Timurid Empire
- Musha'sha'iyyah and Turkomans

Fourth volume: Safavid dynasty from emergence to decline

- Safavid dynasty
- Ismail and the establishment of the Safavid state
- Tahmasp and the confirmation of the Safavid state
- Tahmasp died and the crisis in the Safavid state
- King Abbas I of Persia
- King Safi of Persia and King Abbas II of Persia
- King Suleiman of Persia
- King Sultan Husayn
- The decline of the Safavid state

== Author motivation ==
Rasul Jafarian in a part of introduction of the first volume of the book, expresses his motivation for writing this book as follows:

"The purpose of writing this book is to review the history of Islamic Iran from origin of Islam to the contemporary era. What is formally important to the author is that the material be presented without exaggeration and difficulty, and relatively simple in unpretentious language."

== Review ==
The book History of Islamic Iran has been reviewed several times.

== See also ==
- Atlas of Shia
- The specialized library on Islam and Iran
- Bibliography of Rasul Jafarian
- Political History of Islam
- The intellectual and political life of Shia Imams
- Reflection on the Ashura movement
- Rijal al-Kashshi
