= Qamus al-Rijal (book) =

Book by Mohammad-Taqi Shoushtari

Qamus al-rijal
- Authors: Mohammad-Taqi Shoushtari
- Language: Arabic, Persian
- Subject: Criticism concerning the book Tanghihol-Maghal
- Published: 1999
- Publication place: Iran
- Pages: 720

Qamus al-rijal (book) (Arabic/Persian: قاموس الرِجال) is an (Islamic) book regarding "Rijal", in Arabic; which has been written by the Iranian Twelver Shia scholar Mohammad-Taqi Shoushtari in 12 volumes, authoring's start in 1936. Qamus al-rijal was written as a criticism concerning the book Tanghihol-Maghal (written by Abdullah Mamaghani). The writer asserts that: he himself has removed the mistakes/errors which were found in the book of Tanqihol-Maqal.

This book has been published in 1999 by "Markaze Nashre-Ketab, Mo'aseseye Nashre-Eslami" (Book Publishing Center, Islamic Publishing Institute). The author of the book is Mohammad-Taqi Shoushtari who is one of the scholars of Elme-Rejal (Biographical evaluation) of the fourteenth lunar century. Shoushtari intended to name his book"Tashih Tanqih al-Maghal"; but he finally chose his book's name as Qamus-al-Rijal due to his friends/relatives' suggestion.

== Other names ==
Qamus al-Rijal has been named by Agha Bozorg Tehrani as "Ta'liaqat-Tanqih al-Maqal (Commentary on the Revision of the Article)" and also as "Hawashi Tanqih al-Maqal (The margins of the revision of the article)"

== See also ==
- Mohammad-Taqi Shoushtari
- Rijal al-Kashshi
- Al-Majdi fi Ansab al-Talibiyyin
