= Ikhtiyar ma'rifat al-rijal =

Medieval Shi'ite work on biographical evaluation

Ikhtiyār maʿrifat al-rijāl
- Author: Muhammad ibn Umar al-Kashshi (c. 854–941/951)
- Language: Arabic
- Subject: early Shi'ite hadith transmitters
- Genre: biographical evaluation (ʿilm al-rijāl)
- One of the four main Shi'ite rijāl works.

Ikhtiyār maʿrifat al-rijāl (Arabic: اختیار معرفة الرجال), also known as the Rijāl al-Kashshī (Arabic: رجال الکَشّي), is a Twelver Shi'ite work of biographical evaluation (ʿilm al-rijāl) originally written by Muhammad ibn Umar al-Kashshi (c. 854–941/951) and abridged by Shaykh Tusi (995–1067 CE).

Al-Kashshi's original work is now lost. The reason given by Tusi to abridge al-Kashshi's work is that it contained many errors. The abridged work as extant today contains 1115 hadiths and refers to 515 companions of the Shi'ite Imams.

It is one of the four books of Shi'ite biographical evaluation which are regarded as authoritative in Twelver Shi'ism.

== Title ==
The work was abridged by Shaykh Tusi in 1064 as Ikhtiyār maʿrifat al-rijāl, which means "The Selection of the Knowledge of the Men". The "Men" (Arabic: rijāl) in the title refers to early transmitters of hadith and other historical figures who knew the Shi'ite Imams. It is also sometimes called Rijāl al-Kashshī ("al-Kashshi's Men"), to point to al-Kashshi's original authorship. Ibn Shahr Ashub referred to it as Maʿrifat al-nāqilīn ʿan al-aʾimma al-ṣādiqīn (Arabic: معرفة الناقلین عن الأئمة الصادقین‌), meaning "The Knowledge of Those Who Transmitted from the Sincere Imams".

== Content ==
The work deals with the biographical evaluation (ʿilm al-rijāl) of a wide variety of early Muslim figures. Though most of these figures are early Shi'ite hadith transmitters, it also covers other contemporaries of the Shi'ite Imams, as well as a number of people who were not considered to be particularly reliable or praiseworthy. The biographies are organized according to the central Muslim figures to whom the subjects of the biographies were companions, thus starting with the companions of the prophet Muhammad and ending with the companions of Hasan al-Askari (the 11th Imam according to Twelver Shia tradition) and some of the scholars from the time of the Minor Occultation.

== See also ==
- Al-Majdi
- Ahmad ibn Ali al-Najashi (c. 982–1058), author of a similar work called the Rijāl al-Najāshī
- Qamus al-Rijal (book)
- Al-Kamal fi Asma' al-Rijal
- Usd al-ghabah fi marifat al-Saḥabah
- Biographical evaluation
- Eʿteqādātal-Emāmīya
- The intellectual and political life of Shia Imams
- Atlas of Shia
- History of Islamic Iran
- Political History of Islam
- Reflection on the Ashura movement
