= Political History of Islam =

Book about history of Islam in Persian language

- Author: Rasul Jafarian
- Original title: تاریخ سیاسی اسلام
- Translator: Ali Hashem al-Asadi (to Arabic); Ali Ebrahimi (to English); Tarek Habib (to Urdu)
- Language: Persian, English, Urdu
- Series: 2 volumes
- Subject: Analytical history of Islam from a political perspective
- Publisher: Ministry of Culture and Islamic Guidance (Persian edition); Dalile Ma (Persian edition); Ansarian (English edition); Islamic Research Foundation (Arabic edition)
- Publication date: 1994 and 2001 (Persian edition); 2003 (English edition); 2005 (Urdu edition); 2006 (Arabic edition)
- Publication place: Iran
- Pages: (Persian edition); 692 (1st volume); 828 (2nd volume)

The Political History of Islam (Persian: تاریخ سیاسی اسلام) is a two-volume book by Rasul Jafarian. The first volume is entitled "The life conduct of the Prophet (of Islam)" in 692 pages and the second volume is entitled "History of the Caliphs" in 828 pages. The book has been translated into English, Arabic and Urdu.

== Introduction ==
The author Rasul Jafarian states in a part of the introduction of this collection:

"The author admits that his judgments are not in accordance with reality in all cases; Because he is not necessarily an expert in all of these courses and is not familiar with the sources, especially the newly published research sources. However, as can be obtain text from the resources, an attempt has been made to consider the olden sources in each section."

== Structure ==
In the first volume of this two-volume book, which has been published with an analytical approach, called "The life conduct of the Prophet (of Islam)", examines the political history of Islam from life to the death of Mohammad Ibn Abdullah. But in the second volume called "History of the caliphs from the death of the messenger(s) to the decline of the umayyad", in addition to reviewing events, biography, and the origins of the first caliphs and the history of evolution of the two dynasties of the Umayyad and Abbasid, the life of Shiite Imams has also been discussed.

=== The life conduct of the Prophet (of Islam) ===
This volume is written in 7 chapters that they are:

- Chapter One: Muslims historiography
- Chapter Two: Jahiliyyah period
  - The political and social situation of Arabs of Arabian Peninsula
  - Religion and religiosity of people during Jahiliyyah period
  - Culture and science in Jahiliyyah period
- Chapter Three: The Beginning of Islam
- Chapter Four: Islam against the pressure of Quraysh
- Chapter Five: Islam in Medina (In this chapter, the analysis of the causes of rapid expansion of Islam in Medina has been discussed)
- Chapter Six: Wars of Prophet (of Islam) until the fifth year of his emigration (Battle of Badr, Battle of Uhud, Battle of the Trench, Banu Qurayza and war with tribes)
- Chapter Seven: To win over the Hejaz (In this chapter Treaty of Hudaybiyyah, Battle of Khaybar, Conquest of Mecca and... to the death of Mohammad Ibn Abdullah has been discussed)

=== History of the Caliphs ===
This volume is compiled in 12 main sections that they are:

- Section One: Abu Bakr's Caliphate
- Section Two: Omar's Caliphate
- Section Three: Uthman's Caliphate
- Section Four: Ali's Imamate
- Section Five: Hasan ibn Ali's Imamate
- Section Six: Mu'awiya's Kingdom
- Section Seven: Battle of Karbala and its Consequences
- Section Eight: Transfer of Caliphate from Sufyanids to Marwanids
- Section Nine: Imam Sajjad
- Section Ten: The government of the Marwanids
- Section Eleven: Shiites in the last decades of the Umayyad government
- Section Twelve: the Marwanids government facing the decline

== Critique and review ==
This two-volume book, in addition to the subject of several interviews and reports, has been criticized.

== See also ==
- Atlas of Shia
- The specialized library on Islam and Iran
- Bibliography of Rasul Jafarian
- History of Islamic Iran
- The intellectual and political life of Shia Imams
- Reflection on the Ashura movement
- Rijal al-Kashshi
