= Seyyed Qutb al-Din Mohammad Neyrizi =

Shiite mystic and one of the leaders of Zahabiya genealogy

Coordinates: 32°00′18″N 44°18′54″E

- سید قطب‌الدین محمد نیریزی
- Born: 1689; Neyriz, Safavid Iran
- Died: 5 April 1760 (18 Sha'ban 1173 AH); Najaf, Ottoman Empire (modern-day Iraq)
- Burial place: Wadi-us-Salaam cemetery, Najaf, Iraq
- Other names: Mohammad Hosseini Zahabi; Mohammad Hosseini Shirazi; Qutb al-Din Mohammad Zahabi Tabrizi; Mohammad Zahabi Tabrizi; Qutb al-Din Neyrizi
- Occupations: 32nd Qutb of Zahabiya genealogy; Activities in the field of mysticism, wisdom and conduct

Seyyed Qutb al-Din Mohammad Neyrizi (born 1689 in Neyriz – died 1760 in Najaf) was a prominent Iranian mystic of the Safavid period (1501 to 1736). He was 32nd Qutb of Zahabiya genealogy (Shiite Sufi sect). All historians have written his name as Mohammad and his title as Qutb al-Din. In addition to his high position in the history of Shiite mysticism, he was one of the most important and influential political thinkers of the late Safavid period.

== Birth and lineage ==
Seyyed Qutb al-Din Mohammad Neyrizi was born 1689 in Neyriz, Neyriz County, Fars province, Iran. The historians also mention his place of birth as Neyriz. The exact date of his birth is not mentioned in any of the biographies, but according to the introduction of his book "Ode to Love" (Arabic: قصيده عشقيه), it can be found that it happened approximately around the year 1689 (1100 AH). His lineage reaches to Ali ibn Husayn Zayn al-Abidin (the fourth Imam in Shiʻi Islam) through 26 intermediaries of Sayyids, the elders of the religion. His lineage reaches to Ali ibn Abi Talib (the first Imam of Shia Muslims) through his father through 28 intermediaries. His mother descended from Al-Musawi family, so Seyyed Qutb al-Din Mohammad Neyrizi joins Musa al-Kadhim (the seventh Imam in Twelver Shia Islam) on his mother's side.

== Life and education ==
Exact information is not available about Seyyed Qutb al-Din Mohammad Neyrizi's childhood. He probably lived in his hometown until adolescence, where he became acquainted with mystical literature. After that, he went to Shiraz and Isfahan and studied the sciences of Islamic jurisprudence, hadith, wisdom etc. with scholars such as Mullah Shah Mohammad Darabi (died 1728), and then turned to the acquisition of divine knowledge and true sciences, and studied under Sheikh Ali Naghi Estahbanati (died 1717) when he was about twenty years old. He acquired the divine sciences and knowledge from Sheikh Ali Naghi Estahbanati who was one of the greats of the Zahabiya genealogy (Shiite Sufi sect) at that time. Seyyed Qutb al-Din Mohammad Neyrizi was also honored as the son-in-law of Sheikh Ali Naghi Estahbanati.

After the death of Sheikh Ali Naghi Estahbanati, Seyyed Qutb al-Din Mohammad Neyrizi became the religious leader of Zahabiya genealogy (so-called Qutb of the sect) and its promoter, and he became responsible for guidance and education. Until the late of the 1720s (1130s AH), he continued to study and acquire religious sciences from the scholars and great men of science and mysticism of that time, and although he was the Qutb of the Zahabiya genealogy at that time, he did not stop learning. Seyyed Qutb al-Din Mohammad Neyrizi emigrated to Shiraz to complete his studies in Arabic literature, Islamic jurisprudence, hadith and wisdom. It is said that in 1713 and 1714 (1125 and 1126 AH) he taught religious and mystical sciences in Grand Mosque of Shiraz. Probably in this period – between 1714 and 1716 (1126 and 1128 AH) – he began to apprenticing under Mullah Shah Mohammad Darabi (died 1728) and Mullah Mohammad Ali Sakkaki Shirazi (died in the middle of the 12th century AH). After that, he left for Najaf. Since Seyyed Qutb al-Din Mohammad Neyrizi was in Kufa in 1717 (1129 AH), he must have gone to Iraq around 1716 (1128 AH). According to Seyyed Qutb al-Din Mohammad Neyrizi himself, he met Seyyed Hashem Bahraani in Mosque of Kufa in 1717 (1129 AH) and was fascinated by his knowledge and perfection and became his student for some time.

Seyyed Qutb al-Din Mohammad Neyrizi, as he himself has said in some of his works, returned to Iran after a while and was in Qazvin in 1718 (1130 AH). In Qazvin, he began to apprenticing under Mir Ebrahim Qazvini (died 1732). In addition to studying, Seyyed Qutb al-Din Mohammad Neyrizi copied a manuscript of the Du'a al-Sabah written in the Kufic script by Mir Ebrahim Qazvini, and also arranged and completed the book "Manzumeye Alavieh" there. After that, he left for the holy city of Mashhad, where he met Mir Mohammad Taqi Khorasani (died 1726). After a while, he came to Isfahan along with Mir Mohammad Taqi Khorasani from Mashhad. Seyyed Qutb al-Din Mohammad Neyrizi must have arrived in Isfahan before the Afghan invasion, i.e. before 1722 (1134 AH). Because in addition to most sources mentioning Seyyed Qutb al-Din Mohammad Neyrizi presence in Isfahan before that date, he also studied under Mullah Mohammad Sadegh Ardestani (died 1721) in Isfahan for a while. However, he entered Isfahan around 1719 or 1720 and used the presence of Mullah Mohammad Sadegh Ardestani and Agha Khalil Esfahani (died 1724), and lived there until the early 1730s (1140s AH). He was also proficient in politics, including writing a letter to Sultan Husayn informing him of the current situation and dangers and predicting an attack by Afghans. In addition, as he himself has pointed out, in the cities of Isfahan, Shiraz, Qazvin and Kashan, he had apprenticeship of many scholars and masters of the day.

Seyyed Qutb al-Din Mohammad Neyrizi lived in Isfahan during one of the most difficult, turbulent and critical periods of Safavid dynasty. According to what he said in his books, it is known that he lived there for many years after the occupation of Isfahan by the Afghans, he has spoken about saving himself and his family from calamities, and told about the re-conquest of Isfahan and the arrival of the King Tahmasp II (reign 1728–1732), which took place in 1729. Therefore, it can be said that he was in Isfahan until about 1730. Then he returned to Shiraz from Isfahan and lived for about two decades there – that is, until the early 1750s (1160s AH). There he wrote and composed, also he trained his disciples, preached, and guided them. During this time, he traveled to his hometown of Neyriz and is said to have taught there for some time. Probably due to the turmoil in Shiraz from 1743 to 1745, Seyyed Qutb al-Din Mohammad Neyrizi went to the Kharg Island for a while.

He left for Najaf in the early 1750s (1160s AH), probably in 1750. He arrived in Najaf in 1750 or 1751. Seyyed Qutb al-Din Mohammad Neyrizi lived in Najaf until the end of his life, where he devoted himself to teaching, composing and training disciples. It is said that he held a meeting there at nights and told mystical secrets to the enthusiasts. He wrote most of his works in Najaf.

== His disciples ==
Seyyed Qutb al-Din Mohammad Neyrizi has trained many disciples, the most prominent of whom are:

- Seyyed Mehdi ibn Morteza ibn Seyyed Mohammad Borujerdi, known as the "Bahr ol-Olum";
- Akhund Mohammad Hashem Darvish Shirazi, spiritual guardian and caliph of Seyyed Qutb al-Din Mohammad Neyrizi, thirty-third Qutb of the Zahabiya genealogy;
- Akhund Mullah Mehrab Gilani, representative of Seyyed Qutb al-Din Mohammad Neyrizi in Isfahan and Iraq;
- Agha Mohammad Bidabadi, famous scholar and mystic of the late twelfth century AH;
- Mohammad Baqir Abdul Saleh Shirazi
- Sheikh Ahmad Ehsaei
- Sheikh Jafar Najafi, known as the "Khatam al-Mujtahedin";
- Mir Mohammad Ali Kashani Asam
- Sheikh Mohammad Ehsaei
- Mullah Mohammad Waez Bayat Labib, from famous ascetics;
- Seyyed Ali, elder son of Seyyed Qutb al-Din Mohammad Neyrizi;
- Lotfali Khan Khorasani
- Seyyed Mohammad Najafi
- Taqi Khan, ruler of Fars;
- Mirza Mohammad Akhbari Neyshaburi

== Bibliography ==
His pre-Sufi writings are all gone. However, from his writings related to the period of Sufism and the stages of his spiritual perfection, the following can be mentioned (most in Arabic and some in Persian):

- Faslol Khetaab (Arabic: فصل الخطاب, English meaning: The final word): In matters of monotheism. It contains three thousand Arabic poem verses about mysticism. This book contains an introduction, thirteen praises, and a conclusion. In each praise, a chapter of the general divine issues is defined and explained. Republished in lithography in Tehran in 1955.
- Kanz ol-Hekmah (Arabic: كنز الحكمه, English meaning: The treasure of wisdom): It includes seven introductions and eighteen insights that explain the issue of the unity of existence and quality of the seven elements of the heart and the description of the seeker's ascension to human degrees and some other historical and useful mystical topics. Republished in lithography in Tehran in 1955.
- Shams ol-Hekmah (Arabic: شمس الحكمه, English meaning: The sun of wisdom): This work in the form of ode in ninety-six verses in Arabic, includes research on the expression of the Quran and the rejection of the wisdom of material philosophers and the proof of true existence and the truth of eternal existence. Republished in Salmas in 1955.
- Mesbaah al-Velayah (Arabic: مصباح الولايه, English meaning: The lights of guardianship): In the form of an ode and about five thousand and two hundred verses in the description of the hadith of Imran Sabi. The manuscript of this book is registered under No. 1278 of the Malek National Library.
- Qasideh Eshqieh (Arabic: قصیده عشقيه, English meaning: Ode to love): In expressing the truths of the love in the hearts of divine men, in the form of an ode containing four hundred verses and arranged in ten hints about the truth of love and the truth of the existence of the universe and the creation of human beings and the divine caliphate of The Fourteen Infallibles and degrees of human perfection and that science and practice are degrees of love. Republished in lithography in Shiraz in 1947.
- Safir al-Arefin (Arabic: صفير العارفين, English meaning: The whistle of the knowers): It is an Arabic poem about truth of love and its importance.
- Resaleh dar Maaref Elahi (Persian: رساله در معارف الهى, English meaning: Treatise on Divine Knowledge): This treatise includes twelve praises in the divine teachings and the denial of the verbal and spiritual sharing of truth. It is full of Quran verses and hadiths. This work contains five hundred and seventy-two Arabic verses. The manuscript of this book is registered under No. 1278 of the Malek National Library and No. 4889 of The Parliamentary Library of Iran.
- Manzumeh Sarfieh va Nahvieh Alavieh (Arabic: منظومه صرفيه و نحويه علويه, English meaning: The system of composition and syntactic structure of Alawites): About Arabic language system. The Morphology part of it consists of one thousand four hundred and twenty-three verses. Some parts of Arabic vocabulary of it completed by his son Seyyed Ali consists of one hundred and sixty-eight verses. The rest of it related to the hundred syntactic factors which are three hundred and twenty verses.
- Resaleh Eest Arabi (Arabic: رساله‌ای است عربی, English meaning: An Arabic treatise): In expressing the true unity of the Almighty and denying the verbal and spiritual commonality by the divine mystics methods. Republished in Shiraz in 1973.
- Qasideh Ebdaeeyeh (Arabic: قصيده ابداعيه, English meaning: Ode to innovation): One hundred and seventy-two verses in the discussion of the issuance of grace from the burden of transcendence and the levels of existence. Registration No. 4889 of The Parliamentary Library of Iran and No. 364 of the Central Library of University of Tehran.
- Resaleh Efaazeh Roohieh (Arabic: رساله افاضه روحيه, English meaning: Treatise on Spiritual Spread): In form of Arabic prose in three parts about truth of the general spirit and the number of souls and the levels of the ego and the heart and the intellect and the religious and practical aspects and the seven levels of the heart in detail. Translated and republished in Tehran in 1913.
- Anvar al-Velayah (Arabic: انوار الولايه, English meaning: The glows of guardianship): Persian poetry in praising of Muhammad and Ali. Also about self-knowledge and incitement to leave the material world and encourage to learn the divine sciences and stay away from the official sciences. This book contains one thousand six hundred and seventy verses, of which only a few bits have been found so far.
- Resaleh Menhaj al-Tahrir (Arabic: رساله منهج التحرير, English meaning: Essay on the method of writing): Persian poem about monotheism, equiponderant to the Makhzan ol-Asrar by Nizami, contains 258 verses, republished in Shiraz.
- Sharh va Tarjomeye Manzum Doaye Mobarake Sabah (Persian: شرح و ترجمه منظوم دعاى مبارک صباح, English meaning: Description and translation of blessed Du'a al-Sabah in poem form): Seyyed Qutb al-Din Mohammad Neyrizi has compiled the prayer Du'a al-Sabah based on the manuscript written in the handwriting of Ali; In such a way that the meaning of each sentence of the prayer is included in a quatrain. He also wrote the Arabic preface on that prayer and its explanation.

For Seyyed Qutb al-Din Mohammad Neyrizi, in addition to the aforesaid works, other writings have been mentioned, including:

- Orjoozah dar Sharhe Hadise Hazrat Ali Alayhes Salam (Persian: ارجوزه در شرح حدیث حضرت علی علیه السلام, English meaning: Ode in the explanation of the hadith of Imam Ali (as)): On the corruption of the nation.
- Orjoozah ee dar Osule Feqh (Persian: ارجوزه‌ای در اصول فقه, English meaning: An ode in the principles of jurisprudence)
- Manzumeye Mokhtasare Farsi dar Osule Deen (Persian: منظومه مختصر فارسی در اصول دین, English meaning: A short Persian poem on the principles of religion)
- Tebb ol-Mamaalek (Arabic: طب الممالک, English meaning: Medicine of the governments): It is a treatise stating the cause of government corruption and protesting against the government of that time. It is written in Arabic. A copy of it is available in the collection number 2264 of the library of the Grand Mosque of Qom.
- Mofarreh al-Qolub (Arabic: مفرح القلوب, English meaning: The hearts enlivening): A poem collection on hundreds of syntactic factors.
- Nazm ol-Leaali (Arabic: نظم اللئالی, English meaning: Excellent poems): An ode in Morphology science along with mystical evidence.
- Noor ol-Hedayah (Arabic: نور الهدایه, English meaning: Light of the guidance)
- Orjoozah fi al-Towhid (Arabic: اُرجوزة في التوحيد, English meaning: Ode in monotheism): Poetry in Arabic describing Imam Ali.
- Orjoozah fi al-Fiqh va al-Osulain va al-Mavazin al-Shareeyah (Arabic: أرجوزة في الفقه والاُصولين والموازين الشرعية, English meaning: Ode in jurisprudence, principles, and legal scales)
- Badaye al-Hekam (Arabic: بدايع الحكم, English meaning: Unparalleled tips): It is a correspondence in form of prose and order, similar to prayers.
- Tarjomeye Manzume Qazali az Sheikh Farid al-Din Attar Neyshabouri (Persian: ترجمه منظوم غزلى از شيخ فريد الدين عطار نيشابورى, English meaning: Translation of a lyric poem by Sheikh Farid-ud-Din Attar Neyshabouri): In Arabic.
- Jaame Jahaan Namaa (Persian: جام جهان نما, English meaning: The orrery cup): In Persian about monotheism and levels of existence in a mystical method.
- Khabaro Soqut al-Najm fi Daare Ali Alayhes Salaam (Arabic: خبرُ سقوط النجم في دار عليّ عليه السلام, English meaning: The story of the star landing in the house of Ali (as)): According to religious narrations and in Arabic.
- Diwan Qutb Zahabi (Persian: ديوان قطب ذهبى, English meaning: Diwan of Qutb Zahabi)
- Resaleh Erfani (Persian: رساله عرفانى, English meaning: Mystical treatise): It is a Persian treatise on the position and rank of Muhammad in a mystical style.
- Resalat Irfaniah (Arabic: رسالة عرفانية, English meaning: Mystical treatise): It is a treatise on Arabic poetry and prose that, in addition to its contents, has quoted narrations from the Kitab al-Kafi, Uyun Al-Akhbar, Nahj al-Balaghah, and Al-Ihtijaj.
- Al-Rouhiah al-Qodsiah (Arabic: الروحية القدسية, English meaning: The Holy Spirit): In it, he discusses the soul in a mystical way and it is in Arabic.
- Sharh Dua al-Sabah (Arabic: شرح دعاء الصباح, English meaning: Explanation of the Du'a al-Sabah prayer): In this treatise, the author quotes the Du'a al-Sabah prayer and explains it briefly in Arabic.
- Ketab fi al-Hekmat (Arabic: كتاب في الحكمة, English meaning: Book on Wisdom)
- Al-Leaali al-Mansourat (Arabic: اللئالي المنثورة, English meaning: From excellent poems): It is an ode in the explanation of the hadith of Ali in three hundred and seventy verses.
- Al-Marjaan va al-Yaaghut (Arabic: المرجان و الياقوت, English meaning: The coral and the ruby): A poem in Arabic about syntax.
- Manzumat fi Osul al-Deen (Arabic: منظومة في اُصول الدين, English meaning: A poem in the principles of religion): It is a short Persian treatise on the principles of religion (Islam).
- Nameh ee beh Shaykh al-Islam Muhammad Shafi (Persian: نامه‌اى به شيخ الاسلام محمد شفيع, English meaning: A letter to Shaykh al-Islam Muhammad Shafi): It is written in Arabic.
- Vojoodieh (Persian: وجوديه, English meaning: The Existence): It is in Persian.
- Al-Vasael (Arabic: الوسائل, English meaning: The means): Fourteen prayers, supplications and appeals to the portal of the Almighty in Arabic.

== Death ==
In the last decade of his life he went to Najaf and spent the rest of his life there. On 5 April 1760 (18 Sha'ban 1173 AH), he died there and was buried in Wadi-us-Salaam cemetery.

== See also ==
- Ma'ruf al-Karkhi
- Junayd of Baghdad
- Sari al-Saqati
- Najm al-Din Kubra
- Shaikh Asiri Lahiji
