= Atlas of Shia =

Book about Shia Islam in Persian language

- Author: Rasul Jafarian
- Original title: اطلس شیعه
- Translator: Nasir al-Kabi, Seyf Ali (Arabic)
- Language: Persian
- Subject: History of Islam and Islamic nations
- Publisher: National Geographical Organization of Iran
- Publication date: 2008
- Publication place: Iran
- Pages: 743 (Persian edition)
- Awards: Iran's Book of the Year Awards; Jalal Al-e Ahmad Literary Awards; Farabi International Award

Atlas of Shia (Persian: اطلس شیعه) is a book in Persian language, written by Rasul Jafarian, which has been compiled in 743 pages and 12 chapters. According to The specialized library on Islam and Iran, "Atlas of Shia is an authorial-research work whose main purpose is to present a geographical-historical picture of the Shiites throughout the history of Islam from the beginning to the present. In this book, an attempt has been made to present the history of Shiism in the form of geographical maps and to show the limits of the progress of Shiism in every historical period and in every geographical point". The book present a geographical map to show the progress of Shiism in each historical period on a map. Atlas of Shia was unveiled at the 22nd Tehran International Book Fair with the presence of Mostafa Mohammad-Najjar. After unveiling the book at the book fair with a purchase restriction, public libraries and scientific centers could purchase the book at a 10% discount due to limited book circulation.

== Purpose and motivation ==
The book Atlas of Shia has been compiled on the recommendation of Ali Khamenei and on the order of the National Geographical Organization of Iran. The main purpose of this work is to present a geographical-historical picture of the Shiites throughout the history of Islam from the beginning to the present day. Shiites in this book include the Twelver Imams and include the Zaidiyyah, Isma'ilism, and Alavids, as well as their history. Jafarian has tried to achieve his goals of writing the book through the following three methods:

- Providing historical materials and explanations about the evolution of Shiites
- Providing geographical maps
- Providing tables

== Publication status ==
The book Atlas of Shia was published by the National Geography Organization of Iran in 2008. Atlas of Shia has been translated into Arabic and a software version of it have been prepared and distributed. According to the author Rasul Jafarian, the Arabic translation of this book, which was done with the support and emphasis of Ali al-Sistani, is more accurate and powerful than the original Persian version. The translation work of the book lasted from 2010 to 2012 and was published in Al-Huda International Publications and was unveiled in Iraq.

== Chapters ==
The book Atlas of Shia is composed of 12 chapters, which are:

- Chapter One (Beginning of Shiism): In the definition of Shiism and the expression of sects
- Chapter Two (Shiite Imams): Life of the Twelve Shiite Imams
- Chapter Three (Shiism in the cities of Iran): A study of different Shiite areas of history and destiny
- Chapter Four (Shiite governments in Iran): From the Alavids government in Tabaristan to the government of Ruhollah Khomeini
- Chapter Five (Shiism in Iraq): A study of important Iraqi Cities in the past and present and transformation of Shiites in the regions until the nowaday government of Iraq
- Chapter Six (Shiism in the Arabian Peninsula): A study of Shiism in Saudi Arabia and its eastern cities and areas such as Bahrain, Qatar and...
- Chapter Seven (Shiism in Levant): The arrival of Shiism in Levant and Syria and the study of Shiism in Lebanon and the current situation of Lebanese Shiites
- Chapter Eight (Shiism in Africa): A study of the Alavids Idrisid dynasty and the Fatimid Caliphate, invasion and influence of Shiism in different African countries in the Last hundred years
- Chapter Nine (Shiites in the Indian subcontinent and Afghanistan): Shiite states in areas such as Hyderabad and areas of India, Kashmir and Pakistan and the situation of Shiites in these areas and Shiite influence in Malaysia, Indonesia and Thailand
- Chapter Ten (Shiites in the Caucasus and Turkey): Shiites of Azerbaijan as well as Istanbul and other cities of Turkey
- Chapter Eleven (Shi'ism in Europe): A discussion of the Shiites of Britain, Germany, as well as Italy and Belgium, and the influence of Shi'ism in Europe in the last century
- Chapter Twelve (Shi'ism in the United States): A survey of Shiites in the United States and Canada And Shiite institutions in these areas

== Outcomes ==
After publication of the book, finally in July 2011 at the University of Isfahan and in collaboration with the Faculty of Literature and Humanities and its students, a meeting was held during which, leading to numerous articles and research on the Atlas of Shia. In this working group, which is known as the Atlas of Shia Criticism Working Group, critiques of the book were reviewed. In the continuation of this conference, Rasul Jafarian took the place of the speaker and responded to some criticisms. In the end, Rasul Jafarian was praised for writing the book Atlas of Shia.

== Awards ==
In the 27th Book of the Year Festival of the Islamic Republic of Iran, the book Atlas of Shia in the field of History was selected and honored. The book also won the Jalal Al-e Ahmad Literary Awards and the Farabi International Award at the same time.

== See also ==
- Al-Majdi
- The specialized library on Islam and Iran
- Bibliography of Rasul Jafarian
- Political History of Islam
- The intellectual and political life of Shia Imams
- Reflection on the Ashura movement
- Rijal al-Kashshi
- Understanding Islamic Sciences
- Spiritual Discourses
