= Rasul Jafarian =

Iranian scholar and historian (b. 1964)

- رسول جعفریان
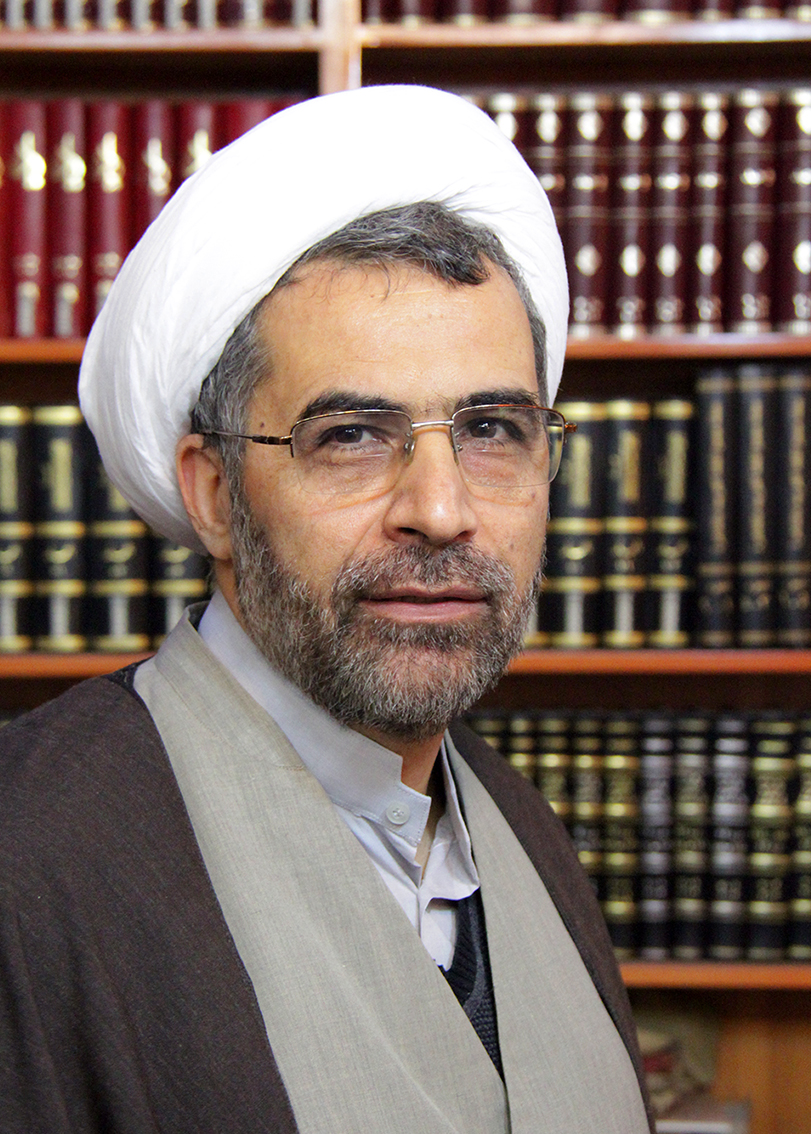
- Jafarian in 2020
- Born: 30 June 1964 (age 62); Khvorasgan, Isfahan Province, Imperial State of Iran
- Education: Level 4 of Seminary
- Occupations: History of Iran researcher; History of Shia Islam researcher; Cleric; Professor; Translator; Writer
- Awards: Iran's Book of the Year Awards 2 times; Jalal Al-e Ahmad Literary Awards; Farabi International Award 2 times
- Website: www.rasul-jafarian.com

Rasul Jafarian (Persian: رسول جعفریان; born 30 June 1964) is an Iranian Shia cleric and researcher in field of Iranian history. He is currently the Professor of the Department of History at the University of Tehran, the Director of The specialized library on Islam and Iran, and the Director of the Central Library of the University of Tehran. Rasul Jafarian became a permanent member of the Academy of Sciences of Iran in June 2018 with the vote of the members of the General Assembly of the Academy of Sciences.

== Life ==
=== Birth ===
Rasul Jafarian was born on 30 June 1964, in Khvorasgan, Isfahan Province, Iran.

=== Education ===
After completing his primary education in Khvorasgan, he traveled to Isfahan and spent his Middle school education there. During his stay in Isfahan, Jafarian freely attended classes in religious schools. He moved to Qom in 1978 to continue his seminary education and first attended the classes of Khan School and then Resalat School.

=== Teaching ===
In 1980, after completing his studies, began teaching at the University of Tehran and University of Isfahan. Islamic studies and history of Islam are among the fields that he has taught. Jafarian became a permanent member of Academy of Sciences of Iran in June 2018 and is currently teaching at the University of Tehran with the rank of professor.

== Research field ==
Jafarian's main research is on the history of Shia Islam, but he has also done a lot of research in fields such as the political history of the beginning of Islam and the history of the Safavid period. He has also published numerous studies and articles on the history of Iranian pilgrimage (Hajj).

== Awards ==
Jafarian has received several national awards for his writings. The book Atlas of Shia (Persian: اطلس شیعه), selected for Iran's Book of the Year Awards and winner of the Jalal Al-e Ahmad Literary Awards and the Farabi International Award and the book The currents and religious-political organizations in Iran (Persian: جریان‌ها و سازمان‌های مذهبی سیاسی ایران) have also been selected for the Farabi International Award.

== Executive responsibilities ==
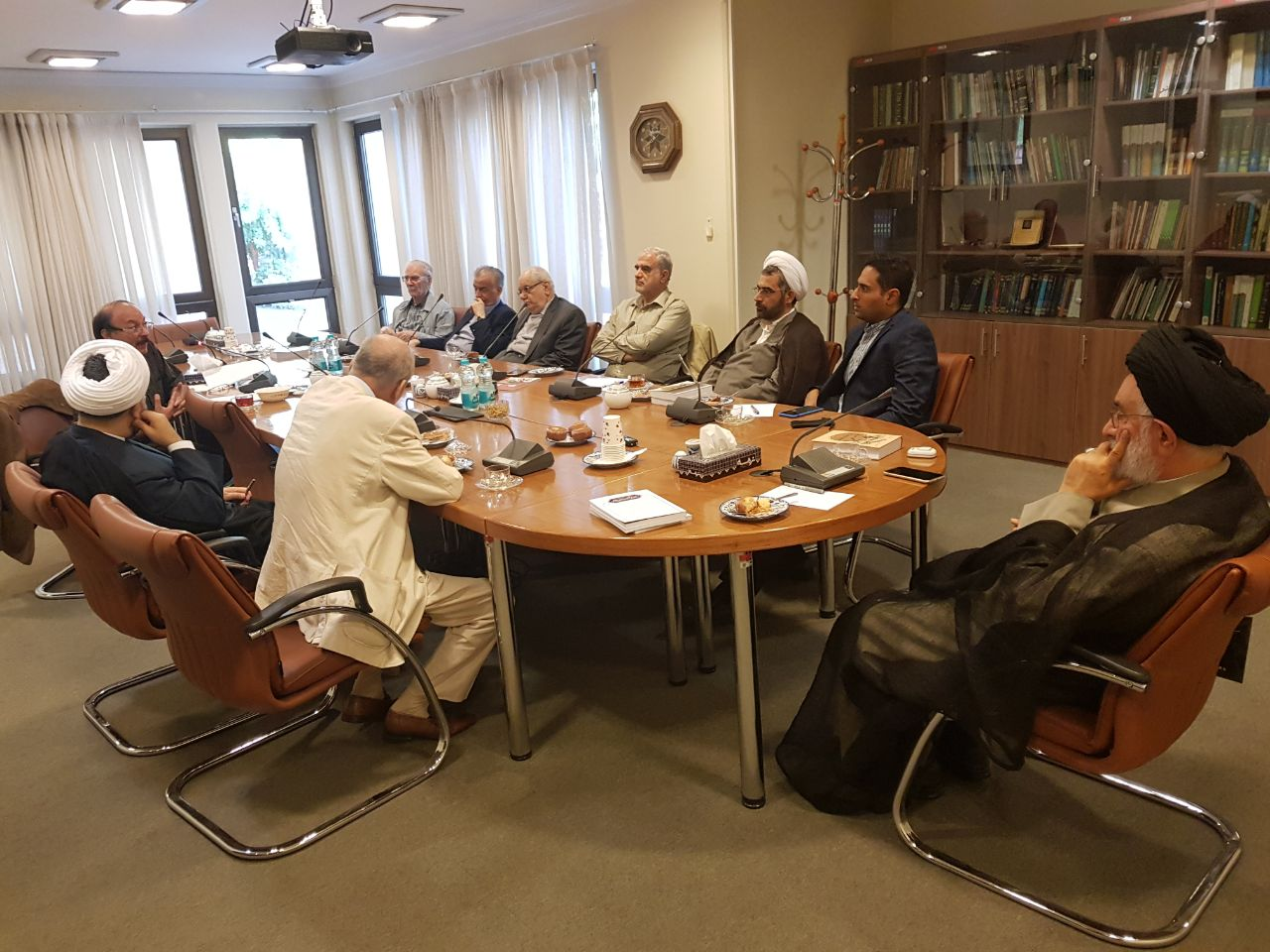
Rasul Jafarian in the book review session (4 August 2019)

Jafarian has also had several executive responsibilities in his record. These responsibilities include:

1. Establishment and management of The specialized library on Islam and Iran in 1995.

2. Head of Library, Museum and Documentation Center of the Islamic Consultative Assembly of Iran from September 2008 to November 17, 2012.

3. Head of the Central Library and Documentation Center of the University of Tehran since November 2017.

== Bibliography ==
Jafarian is a prolific writer and has many works in the science of history. He started writing in 1985 with a book entitled An Introduction to the History of Islam. He has authored more than 90 books, some of which are in large numbers; For example, his book entitled Historical essays have been republished more than 20 volumes. What doubles the importance of his work is the impact of his pen; In a way, some of his works are among the academic curriculum resources and the resources of master and doctorate in history in Iran. His works have been translated into other languages such as English, Arabic and Urdu. Some of Jafarian's works are:

- Atlas of Shia (Persian: اطلس شیعه)
- The intellectual and political life of Shia Imams (Persian: حیات فکری و سیاسی امامان شیعه)
- Political History of Islam (Persian: تاریخ سیاسی اسلام)
- Religio-political currents and organizations in Iran (Persian: جریان‌ها و سازمان‌های مذهبی سیاسی ایران)
- History of Islamic Iran (Persian: تاریخ ایران اسلامی)
- Reflection on the Ashura movement (Persian: تأملی در نهضت عاشورا)

== Law on the use of electronic resource files ==
In August 2020, Rasul Jafarian proposed a law on the use of electronic resource files in Iran. In a note, he proposed a bill to use electronic files of resources (books, articles and dissertations) to the Ministry of Culture and Islamic Guidance of Iran to send to the government and parliament to take a step towards publishing digital books.

== See also ==
- Mostafa Mohaghegh Damad
- Abdolmohammad Ayati
- Ahad Gudarziani
- Ahmad Kazemi
- Ali Osat Hashemi
- Alireza Feyz
- Fathollah Mojtabaei
- Mahmoud Mar'ashi Najafi
