= The intellectual and political life of Shia Imams =

Book about Shia (Islam) leaders in Persian language

- Author: Rasul Jafarian
- Original title: حیات فکری و سیاسی امامان شیعه
- Language: Persian, Arabic and Urdu
- Series: 1 volume
- Subject: The Twelve Imams
- Publisher: Islamic Development Organization
- Publication date: 1991
- Publication place: Iran
- Pages: 780

The intellectual and political life of Shia Imams (Persian: حیات فکری و سیاسی امامان شیعه) is the name of a book by Rasul Jafarian that has been written with the aim of investigating the political and intellectual aspects of the life of the Shiite twelve Imams. The content of this book was first published as a series of articles in Noor-e Elm magazine and then became an independent book. The book has also been translated into Arabic and Urdu. In 2011, the book was published again with many corrections. Excerpt and summary of this book in 400 pages has been selected by the Research deputy of Islamic Maaref University as a textbook in universities of Iran for history of Imamate course.

== Introduction ==
The author, Rasul Jafarian, writes in a part of the introduction of the book:

"The Imamiyyah branch is a ritual based on the teachings of the Quran, the Prophet and the manners and methods of the Ahl al-Bayt. A religion that, according to the Quranic view, pays attention to all aspects of human life and, while emphasizing Shiism as the superior Islam, has laid the foundation for the whole of Islam."

== Structure ==
In a 40-page introduction, author first deals with the historiography of the Shiites and their books on the Shiite Imams, and then discusses in detail the political and intellectual aspects of each of their lives. In this way, first, he provided information about their birth and personality, and while pointing to the most prominent feature of each of them, then he studied the political and social situation of the time of that Imam.

The table of contents of this book is briefly:

- Foreword
- Imam Ali
- Imam Hasan
- Imam Husayn
- Imam Sajjad
- Imam Baqir
- Imam Sadiq
- Imam Kadhim
- Imam Ridha
- Imam Jawad
- Imam Hadi
- Imam Askari
- Imam Mahdi

== Worthiness ==
The book Intellectual and political life of Shia Imams has been the subject of several articles, dissertations and reviews.

== See also ==
- Atlas of Shia
- The specialized library on Islam and Iran
- Bibliography of Rasul Jafarian
- History of Islamic Iran
- Political History of Islam
- Reflection on the Ashura movement
- Rijal al-Kashshi
