= List of libraries in Iran =

This is a list of libraries in Iran. There are more than 3000 public libraries in Iran.

== Libraries by province ==
=== Bushehr ===
- Ershad Library, Bushehr

=== East Azerbaijan ===
- Tabriz National Library
- Tarbiat Library, Tabriz

=== Isfahan ===
- Sarouyeh, near present-day Isfahan

=== Kerman ===
- Kerman National Library

=== Kermanshah ===
- Imam Reza Library, Kermanshah

=== Khuzestan ===
- Gundeshapur

=== Qom ===
- Mar'ashi Najafi Library, Qom
- The specialized library on Islam and Iran, Qom

=== Tehran ===
- Library, Museum and Document Center of Iran Parliament, in Baharestan Palace, Tehran
- Malek National Museum and Library, Tehran
- National Library and Archive of Iran
- Central Library of University of Tehran
- Tehran American School

== See also ==
- Copyright law of Iran
- Library associations in Iran
- Library consortia in Iran
- Mass media in Iran

in Farsi

- History of libraries in Iran (in Farsi)
- Libraries of Neyshabur (in Farsi)
