= Sarouyeh =

Ancient Iranian library

Coordinates: 32°37′50″N 51°42′47″E

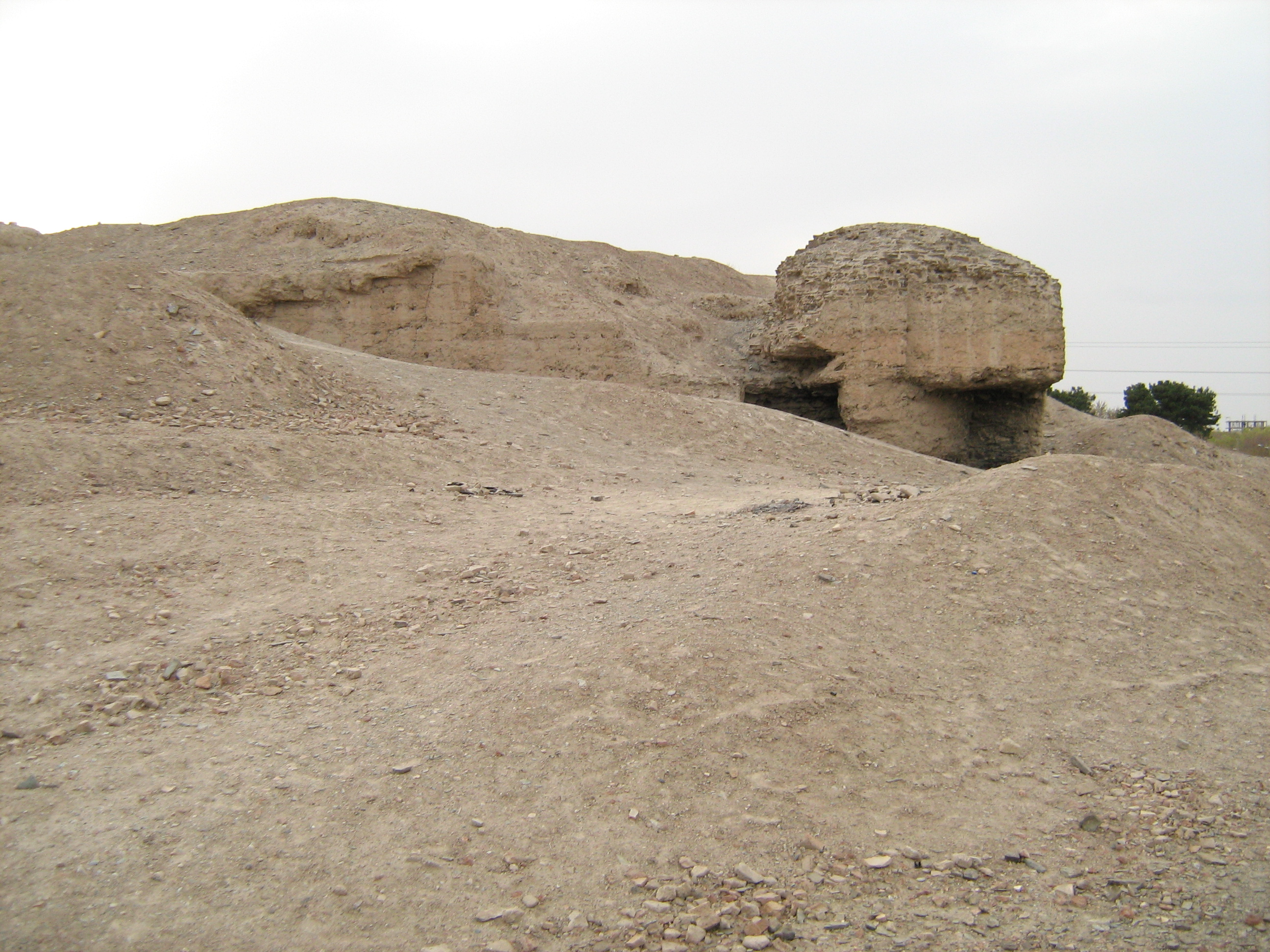
Remnants of Sarouyeh library

Sarouyeh (Persian: سارویه) was a large library in ancient pre-Islamic Iran. The 10th century chronicler Ahmad ibn Rustah refers to it as "Sarough" (ساروق). The Fars Nameh of Ibn Balkhi calls it Haft Halkeh (هفت هلکه).

The library, located near where the city of Isfahan is today, may have been from the era of Tahmuras, in ancient Iran. Majmal al-tawarikh also mentions the library.

Ibn Sa'd al-Iṣfahānī, in the surviving translation of his book Maḥāsin-i Eṣfahān (محاسن اصفهان) edited by Abbas Eqbal Ashtiani, gives both the real and the mythical traditions of the foundation and re-foundation of the library.

Abbas Milani describes the fortified collection of writings and documents as follows:

Though only a few pages of its vast holdings have survived, we know of its grandeur through the testimony of its contemporaries, who compared it, in terms of the awe it inspired, to the Egyptian pyramids".

== See also ==
- List of libraries in Iran
