= Hedayatollah Behboudi =

Iranian Writer

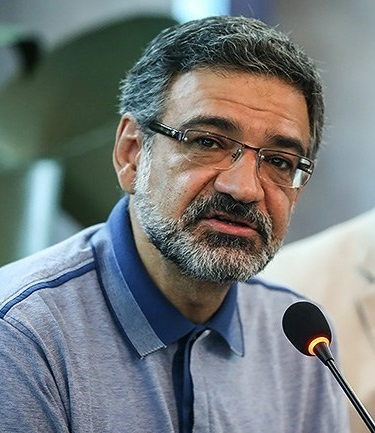
Behboudi

Hedayatollah Behboudi Kalhori (Persian; هدایت الله بهبودی کلهری; born 9 may 1960), known as Hedayatollah Behboudi (Persian: هدایت الله بهبودی) is an Iranian writer and reporter. He was born in Tabriz, and left for Tehran in 1964. He graduated in the field of history from University of Tehran in 1992.

Behboudi is a researcher and historian (of the Iran–Iraq War; commonly known as "holy defense" in Iran), began his career as a reporter at the beginning of the Iran-Iraq war. He also became a correspondent for the Tehran Times newspaper. After three years, he moved to the office of Jomhouri Eslami. Eventually, Behboudi moved into art; and found the office of the Islamic Revolution Literature. He became the quarterly editor-in-chief of history studies.

== Published works ==
- "Sharh-e Esm" a biography of Iran's supreme leader, Seyyed Ali Khamenei;
- "Alef-Laam Khomeini" (A, L, Khomeini); a biography of Iran's first supreme leader Ruhollah Khomeini;
- "Safari Be Mantagheye Mamnoo'eh" (A Trip To The Prohibited Zone)
- "Khorramshahr, Ku Jahan-Ara" ([the city of] Khorramshahr, where is Jahan-Ara);
- "Khorramshahr, Khaneh Ru Be Aftab" (Khorramshahr, the house towards sun);
- "Safar Bar Madare-Mahtab" (journey on the moonlight circuit);
- "Safar Be Halabcheh" (Journey to Halabcheh);
- "Medal-Wa-Morakhasi" (Medal and leave);
- "Pa be Paye Baran" (foot to foot of rain);
- "Safar be Roosieh" (Journey to Russia);
- "Safar be Gholleha" (trip to the tops);
- Jomhoori Islami Be Rewayate Asnaade Savak (Islamic Revolution According to Savak Documents)
- Ruzshomare Tarikhe Moasere Iran (Contemporary history journal of Iran)
- Morteza ayeneye Zendegi-am Bood (Morteza was my life's mirror)
- Tariz Dar Enghelab (Tabriz in Enghelab)
- Shahid Sadoughi (Martyr Sadoughi)

== See also ==
- Alef-Laam Khomeini
- Jalal Al-e Ahmad Literary Awards
- Iran's Book of the Year Awards
