= Abu al-Husain al-Nuri =

Baghdadi Sufi figure and saint (840–908)

Saint Nuri

Mystic
- Born: c. 840 C.E. Baghdad
- Died: c. 908 C.E. Baghdad
- Venerated in: Islam, Sunni
- Influences: Muhammad
- Major works: Stations of the Hearts

Ahmed ibn Muhammad al-Nuri (Persian: ابو الحسین النوری) (died 908 AD), known also as Nuri, was a famous early Sufi saint. He was of Persian origins, but born in Baghdad in 840 CE where spent most of his life. He is the author of Maqamat al-qulub (Stations of the Hearts). He is famous for saying, "I love God and God loves me".

Nuri and several of his friends were accused of heresy and charged in 878 C.E. Nuri offered to be tried before his companions. The regent at the time was impressed by such magnanimity and investigated the case and found these Sufis to be good Muslims. Thus he set the accused free. Nuri was exiled to Raqqa in Syria, and returned later on.

Poetry and statements from Nuri are narrated in popular Sufism. According to popular accounts, he gained the title "Nuri" because he "radiated light when talking". He was acquainted with Junayd Baghdadi.

== Sayings ==
1) Sufism is neither ritual nor knowledge, because if it was a ritual, it would be gained through practice and if it were knowledge, it would be gained through teachings, but Sufism is a moral thing and it is gained by adopting the morals and habits of Allah.

2) The name of enmity with creatures and friendship with God is Sufism.

== Bibliography ==
- Christopher Melchert: The Transition from Ascetism to Mysticism at the Middle of the Ninth Century, in: Studia Islamica 83 (1996), 51–70.
