= Shaikh Asiri Lahiji =

Persian poet and saint (died 1506)

Shaikh Asiri Lahiji (Persian: شیخ اسیری لاھیجی) (death:1506) (full-name: Shamsuddin Muhammad bin Yahya Bin Ali Lahiji Nurbakshi) was a Persian poet, theologian, and Sufi mystic of Noorbakshi Order. He got the traditions of mysticism from Shah Syed Muhammad Nurbakhsh Qahistani and was among Syed Muhammad Nurbaksh's favourite disciples. He joined the service of Syed Muhammad Nurbaksh in A.H 849/A.D 1445 and remained in the service for 16 years. During his service, he thrice obtained the consent of Shah Syed to become a guide to those who came to him to seek guidance.

After the death of Syed Muhammad Nurbaksh, Lahiji took up his abode in Shiraz where he began guiding Nurbakshi followers in the province of Herat. He built a hospice in Shiraz named "Khanqah i Nooriyeh". Lahiji died in Shiraz and was buried in the same hospice. He was the most learned disciple of Mir Sayyid Mihammad Nurbakhsh Qahistani and a great scholar of Sufia Noorbakhshia school of Islam.

== Works ==
He wrote more than 500 ghazals and numerous quatrains under the pen-name Asiri, and was also an outstanding philosopher who wrote an interpretation and a philosophical commentary on Shabistari's Gulshan-i Raz known as Mafatih ul Ejaz Fi Sharah Gulshan-e-Raaz.

His most important works are:-

1. Mafatih ul Ejaz Fi Sharah Gulshan-e-Raaz
2. Masnavi Asrar o Shuhud
3. Divan-e-Assiri

== See also ==
- Seyyed Qutb al-Din Mohammad Neyrizi
