= Sadegh Karamyar =

Iranian writer, journalist, screenwriter, and film director

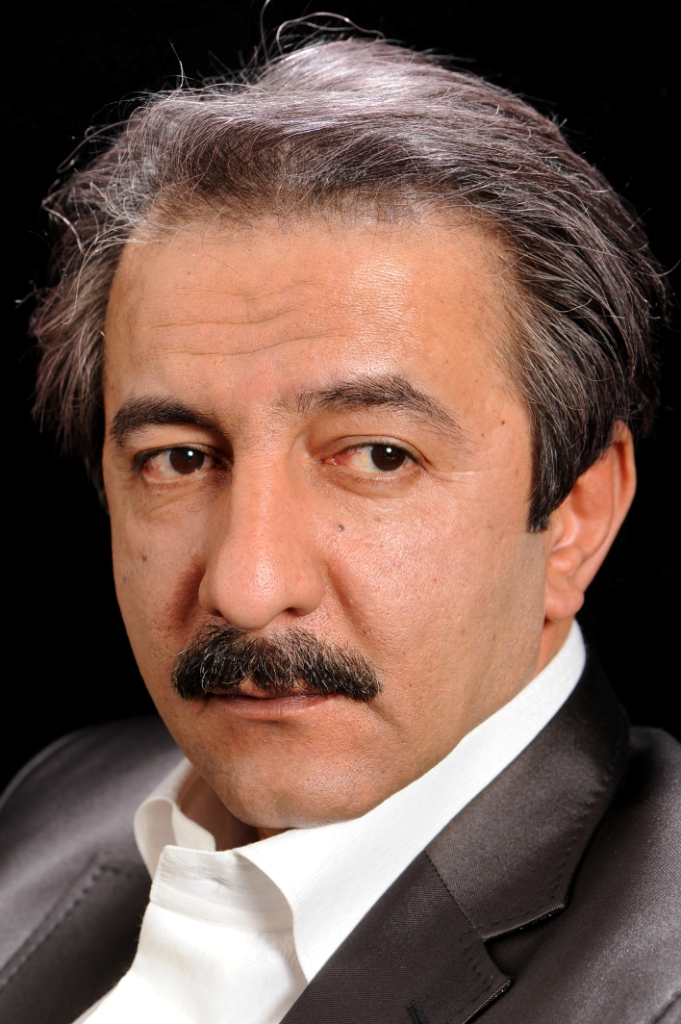
- Born: 18 December 1959 (age 66); Tehran, Iran
- Education: Islamic Azad University
- Occupation: Actor

Sadegh Karamyar (Persian: صادق کرمیار; born 18 December 1959) is an Iranian writer, journalist, screenwriter, and film director. He is best known for his novels, particularly Namira (Immortal) and Ghanimat (The Spoils). He is the screenwriter and director of such TV series as Yek Rooz Ghabl (The Day Before)

== Biography ==
Sadegh Karamyar was born and educated in Tehran, Iran. He studied Literature and Theology at Islamic Azad University and started to publish short stories in newspapers when he was around twenty years old. His first book, Faryad dar Khakestar (Shouting in the Ash), a war stories collection, was published in 1990.

In addition to writing short stories and novels, he has worked as a journalist and an editor of Ettela'at newspaper for ten years. He was a reporter and war correspondent covering Iran–Iraq War during 1986-1988 and the editor of the literary page of the newspaper during 1988–1996. He also worked as the deputy editor of “Mardom va Cinema” Magazine in Farabi Cinema Foundation and the editor-in-chief as well as the writer of a popular radio show, “At the End of the Night."

He has also published many literary reviews about the modern literature of Germany, South America, France, and Iran in magazines. During 2005–2010, he worked as Manager of the Literary Department of Tehran Municipality.

Karamyar has authored several novels and screenplays. Several Iranian movies and TV series have been made based on his screenplays.

He has won many national awards for his novels and screenplays, among which Jalal Al-e Ahmad Literary Award, as Iran's most lucrative literary award, for his novel Namira (Immortal) and Iran's Book of the Year Award for Dasht-haye Soozan (The Burning Plains).

Karamyar has also made several short films. He directed several long television movies and two TV series for IRIB, which won him some national awards.

The first class certificate of art and literature has been conferred on him by the Ministry of Culture and Islamic Guidance due to his promotion of Iran literature and culture.

== Short stories and novels ==
Faryad dar Khakestar (Shouting in the ash) (1990)

Entegham dar Ordooghah (The Revenge in the Camp) (1991)

Namira (Immortal) (2009)

Ghanimat (The Spoils) (2010)

Dasht-haye Soozan (The burning Plains) (2011)

Dard (The Agony) (2013)

Harim (a Sanctuary) (2016)

== Movie and television series ==
=== Credited as director and screenwriter ===
TV series Yek Rooz Ghabl (The Day Before)

TV series Khaterat-e Mard-e Natamam (Memories of an Everlasting Man)

TV movies Ziarat (A Pilgrimage), Roya (A Dream), Khaneye Saheli (Coastal House), Bahane-haye Asheghi (their amatory Fussing), Vaght-e Talaee (Their Golden Moments)

=== Credited as screenwriter ===
Movie Sejde bar Aab (Prostration on Water)

Movie Ashk-e Koose (Tears of a Shark)

Movie Jan Sakht (Die-Hard)

TV series Darya dar Ghorbat (Darya in A Foreign Land)

TV series Guard-e Saheli (Coast Guards)

TV series Virus 2000

=== Cultural activities ===
Karamyar works as a manager at "The Center of Literary Works Creation" (Tehran Municipality, 2005–2009) and "The Writers and Artists Club" (Tehran Municipality, 2006–2010), arranges arts and literature events and served as a jury member of 7th Jalal Al-e Ahmad Literary Award.

=== Awards and honors ===
1988: The first Holy Defense Literature and Art Festival Award from Iran Ministry of Culture and Islamic Guidance

2006: Movie of the Year Award from “Polis Film Festival” for the movie Ziarat (A Pilgmirage)

2009: 3rd Jalal Al-e Ahmad Literary Award for the novel Namira (Immortal)

2009: 28th Iran's Book of the Year Award for the novel Namira (Immortal)

2010: Nominee for 4th Jalal Al-e Ahmad Literary Award for the novel Ghanimat (The Spoils)

2013: The first-class certificate of art and literature from Iran Ministry of Culture and Islamic Guidance
