= Alef-Laam Khomeini =

2018 book by Hedayatollah Behboudi

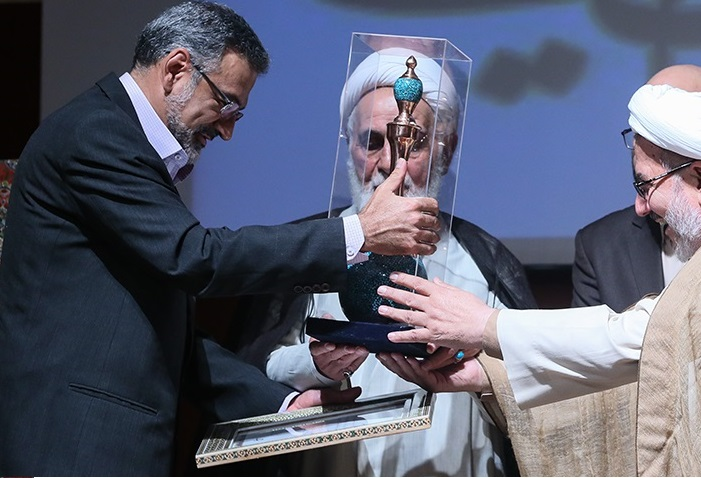
Unveiling of the book "Alef Lam Khomeini"; (by) Hedayatollah Behboudi -- the left person in the portrait, as the author

Alef-Laam Khomeini (Persian: الف لام خمینی) is a book by Hedayatollah Behboudi, a biography of Iran's 1st/former supreme leader, Sayyid Ruhollah Khomeini. This book was published by the institute of "Motale'at wa Pazhuheshhaye Siasi" (political studies and researches) (Persian: مؤسسه مطالعات و پژوهشهای سیاسی) in 2018; It won the Jalal Al-e Ahmad Literary Award, and also Iran's Book of the Year Awards.

The book is a comprehensive study on the life of Ayatollah Ruhollah Khomeini. It starts with an introduction to the Khomeini family and then continues with his birth, upbringing and education.

== Content ==
First edition (Persian)

According to the reporter of IRIB News Agency, the most considerable point in regards to the book of "Alef Lam Khomeini" is that: diverse parts of the book has been written by submitting documents; and ... The mentioned book whose first edition was published in 1157 pages (in 18 chapters), is commenced with the introduction of Seyyed Ruhollah Khomeini's family, and it pursues the movement of Khomeini's life since his birth, ... , schooling in his birthplace, his education in Arak, and immigration to the seminary of Qom. This biography book can be divided into two general sections:

- The first section, is concerning the scientific life of Seyyed Ruhollah Khomeini in Qom—including more than 40 years of his life; it is also mentioned that: During these four decades of his lifetime, he studied, taught, wrote; he likewise trained students and (religious/politic) charters.
- The second section of this biography is concerning the politic life of Seyyed Ruhollah Khomeini that was commenced in 1962, and is connected to the victory of "Islamic movement" in 1979—by passing diverse ups and downs of the age.

== Literary award(s) ==
The book of "Alef Lam Khomeini" earned "Jalal Al-e Ahmad Literary Awards" in 2018 at documentary section. This book, also won (35th) Iran's Book of the Year Awards at the section of documentary.

== See also ==
- Sharh-e Esm (book)
- Seyyed Ruhollah Khomeini, in Childhood
