= Tarbiat Library =

Library in Tabriz, Iran

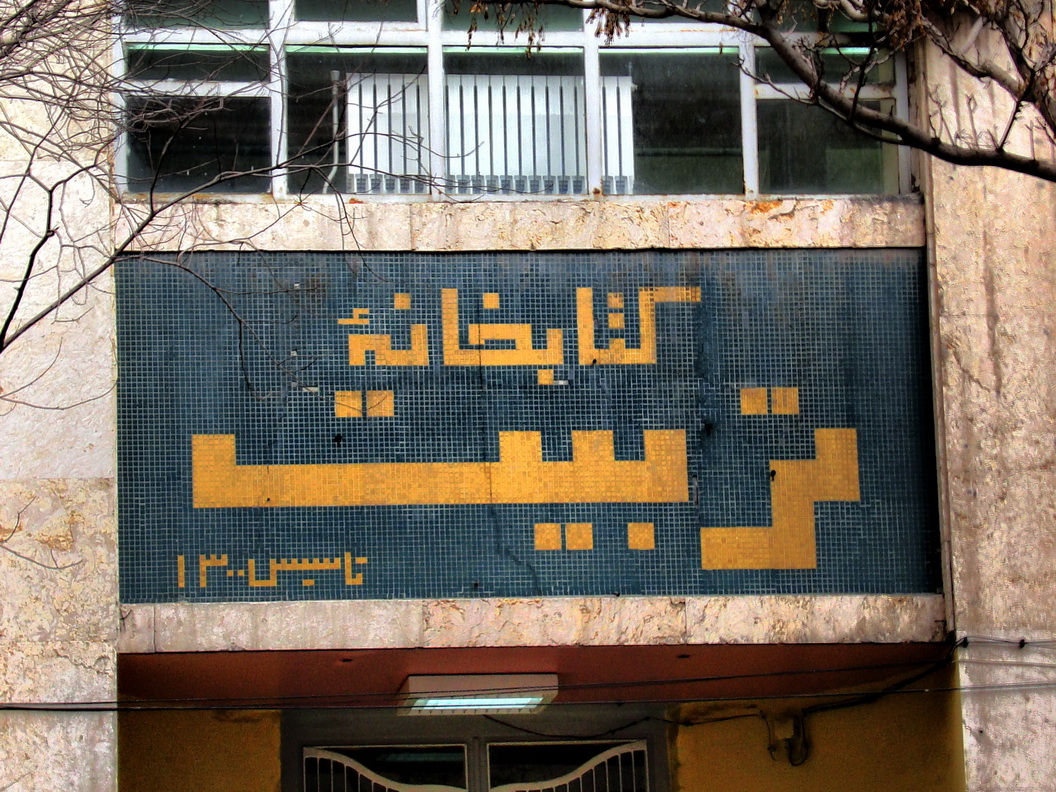

Tarbiat Library (Persian: کتابخانه تربیت) is the first state library constructed in Iran, established in 1921 at Tabriz. The library was founded by Mahammad Ali Tarbiat, an Iranian journalist and politician, as the "Ma'aref public library and reading room" (Persian: كتابخانه و قرائتخانه عمومي معارف) which was later renamed after its founder to Tarbiat Library.

== See also ==
- List of libraries in Iran
