= Muhammad ibn Umar al-Kashshi =

10th century Twelver Shia scholar

Muḥammad ibn ʿUmar al-Kashshī
- مُحَمَّدٌ بْنُ عُمَرَ الْكَشَّيُّ

Personal life
- Born: Kesh, Transoxiana (present-day Uzbekistan)
- Died: 340 Hijri / 951 CE
- Era: Islamic golden age
- Main interest(s): Ilm ar-Rijal, Hadith
- Notable work: Rijāl al-Kashshī

Religious life
- Religion: Islam
- Denomination: Shia
- Jurisprudence: Ja'fari
- Creed: Twelver

Abū ʿAmr Muḥammad ibn ʿUmar ibn ʿAbd al-ʿAzīz al-Kashshī (Arabic: أَبُو عَمْرٍو مُحَمَّدٌ بْنُ عُمَرَ بْنِ عَبْدِ الْعَزِيزِ الْكَشَّيُّ ; Persian: محمد بن عمر بن عبد العزيز كشى ; d. around 951-2), known as al-Kashshi or (in Persian) as Kashshi, was a Persian Twelver Shi'ite scholar specializing in biographical evaluation (ʿilm al-rijāl) and hadith studies. He is the author of the Rijāl al-Kashshī, a major biographical work which ranks as one of the four main sources in the Shi'ite rijāl literature. Al-Kashshi's original work is now lost, but parts of it survive in an abridgement made by Shaykh Tusi (995–1067) called the Ikhtiyār maʿrifat al-rijāl.

== Life ==
Al-Kashshi's exact date of birth is unclear. However, he is known to have been a contemporary of Muhammad ibn Ya'qub al-Kulayni (864–941), author of the Kitāb al-Kāfī. Al-Kashshi and al-Kulayni shared a number of teachers such as Muhammad ibn Ismail al-Naysaburi, as well as some students such as Ibn Qulawayh. This would place al-Kashshi roughly in the same time period as al-Kulayni, i.e., somewhere between the middle of the 9th century and the middle of the 10th century.

He was born in city of Kesh or Kish (known today as Shahrisabz) in Transoxiana (today: Uzbekistan).

== Writings ==
Al-Kashshi's works are all lost today. However, one work known as the Rijāl al-Kashshī survives in an abridgement made by Shaykh Tusi (995–1067), called the Ikhtiyār maʿrifat al-rijāl. This work deals with the biographical evaluation of hadith transmitters, the goal of which was to establish whether individual transmitters are to be regarded as trustworthy, and whether their narrations –one of the main sources of Islamic doctrine– should be accepted or rejected.

The Ikhtiyār maʿrifat al-rijāl ranks as one of the four most important works in the Shi'ite biographical (rijāl) literature.
