= Sharh-e Esm (book) =

Biography of Ali Khamenei

Sharh-e Esm (Persian: شرح اسم) (meaning: Name Description) is the biography of the second supreme leader of Iran, Ali Khamenei. The book is written by Hedayatollah Behboudi (Persian: هدایت الله بهبودی), and has been translated in some other languages. It was published by the institute of Motaale’at wa Pazjuheshhayeh Siyasi (Political Studies and Research Institute).

"Sharh-e Esm" is about biography-related issues of Seyyed Ali Khamenei—since 1939 to 1979—consisting of matters such as his paternal and maternal ancestors (among his father, Seyyed Jawad Khamenei), and so forth. At the first time, this book was simultaneously unveiled with the holding of “International fair of Tehran book”, but its distribution was stopped due to being some historical mistakes; later on, it was distributed after fixing its difficulties.

In regards to choosing the name of the book Sharh-e Esm ("Name Description"), its writer (Hedayatollah Behboudi) mentions that: According to an expression in the science of logic: if we cannot understand the essence of a truth, we will "Sharh" (describe) it; and that's the reason for choosing such name for the book.

== See also ==
- Alef-Laam Khomeini
- Siahat-e Shargh
