= Mohammad-Taqi Shoushtari =

Iranian Islamic scholar (1903–1995)

Mohammad-Taqi Shoushtari محمد تقی شوشتری
- Mohammad Taqi Shoushtari (ra) in the early 80's.
- Title: Ayatollah / Allameh (i.e. great-scholar)

Personal life
- Born: 1903 Najaf, Ottoman Iraq
- Died: 19 May 1995 (aged 91–92) Shushtar, Iran
- Other name: Sheikh-Shoushtari / Allahmeh-Shoushtari Persian: شیخ شوشتری

Religious life
- Religion: Islam
- Denomination: Shia
- Jurisprudence: Ja'fari (Usuli)
- Creed: Twelver

Mohammad-Taqi Shoushtari (Persian: محمد تقی شوشتری; 1903–19 May 1995), also known as Sheikh-e-Shoushtari, was an Iranian Twelver Shia scholar, who was born in 1903 in the city of Najaf, Iraq. Shoushtari's father (Mohammad Kazem Shushtari) was originally from Shushtar and his mother was from Kerman. He lived in Najaf until the age of 7, when he came back to Shushtar.

Sheikh-Shoushtari has written diverse books, amongst of them is "Behja-al-Sabaqah Fi Sharh Nahj-al-Balaqah" in 14 volumes. He also has written the book of "Qamus-al-Rejal" which has been chosen as Iran's Book of the Year Awards in 1992. Mohammad-Taqi died on 19 May 1995 at the age of 95 in the city of Shoushtar.

== Teachers ==
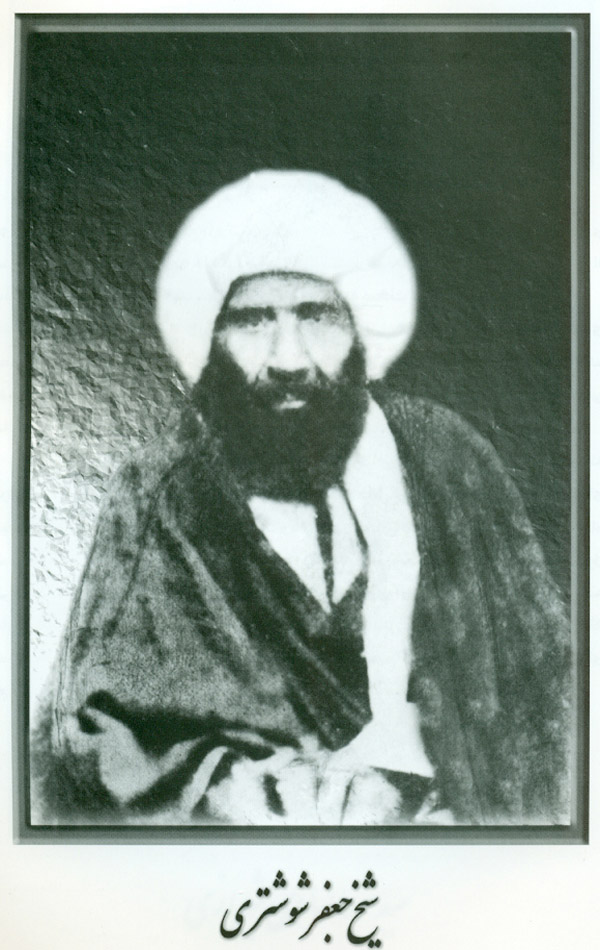
Jafar-Shoshtari (Mohammad-Taqi's grandfather)

Mohammad Taqi Shoushtari had several teachers, among of them are as follows:

- Seyyed Hossein Nouri
- Seyyed Ali-Asqar Hakim (1930)
- Seyyed Mohammad-Ali Emam Known As Emam Shoushtari (1891-1974)
- Mohammad-Kazem Shoushtari (His Father)
- Seyyed Mahdi Ale-Tayeb Jazayeri (1943)
- Seyyed Mohammad-Taqi Sheikhol-Eslam (1924)

== Works ==
Amongst the works/books of Sheikh-Shoushtari are:

- Al-Najmah Fi Sharh Al-Ameh
- Bahj Al-Sabbaqeh Fi Sharh Nahj Al-Balaqeh
- Ayat Al-Bayyenat Fi Haqiyeh Ba'z Al-Manamat
- Al-Arbaoun Haditha
- Resaleh Dar Mohakemeye Beine Sadouq Va Sheikh Mofid Dar Yek Masa'leh Kalami
- Al-Resaleh Al-Mobsareh Fi Ahval Abi-Basir
- Qaza Amir Al-Momenin Ali Ibn Abi Taleb
- Al-Avael
- Al-Badaya'
- Resaleh Fi Tavarikh Al-Nabi Va Alal
- Akhbar Al-Dakhileh
- Moqaddameh Tohid Mofazzal
