= Central Library of University of Tehran =

Library in Tehran, Iran

Coordinates: 35.7031°N 51.3950°E

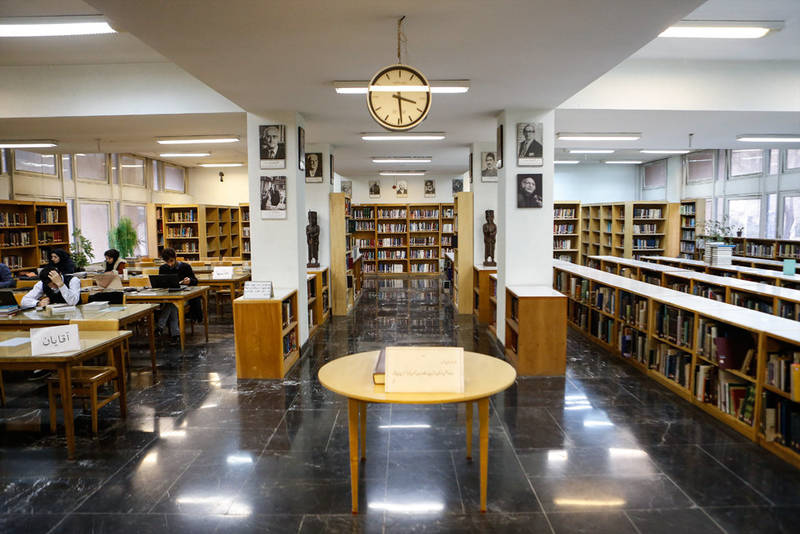
Central Library of the University of Tehran

Central library and documents center of University of Tehran is the biggest academic library in Iran. It was built in 1350.

== Building ==
It has 9 stories and, 22,000 m^{2} (240,000 sq ft) area, its construction material is armed concrete. Its design is based on modern architecture.

== Manuscripts ==
Among manuscripts there is Khamsa of Nizami, Shahnameh, Vendidad, Zakhireye Khwarazmshahi, Book of Roads and Kingdoms, the oldest manuscript being a copy of مجمل اللغه from Ibn Faris.

== Digital library ==
In 2020, the library published 41000 doctorate, and masters dissertations, Digital library includes 12000 manuscripts for free download.

== Other university libraries ==
University of Tehran has 60 libraries. Council of administration has five subcommittees. Every researcher, students from other universities, are allowed to use this library's resources. It is a member of Iranian national committee of world memory, Content national consortium, and International Federation of Library Associations and Institutions.

== Administrators ==
1. Iraj Afshar
2. Abolfazl Ghasemi
3. Ismaeil Hakemi vala
4. Mohammadmehdi Jafari
5. Firooz Harirchi
6. Abolfazl Bromand

== See also ==
- List of libraries in Iran
