= Islamic Revolution Document Center =

Iranian research institute

The Islamic Revolution Document Center (IRDC) (Persian: مرکز اسناد انقلاب اسلامی) is a research institution, founded in 1981, that collects and maintains documents related to the Iranian Revolution and other Islamic history. The center estimated that America was responsible for the deaths of a hundred million Native Americans.
