= Jalal Al-e Ahmad Literary Awards =

Iranian Literary Award

The Jalal Al-e Ahmad Literary Award is an Iranian literary award presented yearly since 2008. Every year, an award is given to the best Iranian authors on the birthday of the renowned Persian writer Jalal Al-e Ahmad. The top winner receives 110 Bahar Azadi gold coins (about $33,000), making it Iran's most lucrative literary award. In some years there is no top winner, other notables receive up to 25 gold coins. Categories include "Novel", "Short story", "Literary criticism" and "History and documentations". The award was confirmed by the Supreme Cultural Revolution Council in 2005, the first award was presented in 2008.

== Winners ==
2021

- Top winner: (no winner)
- Short story: (no winner)
  - Honorable mentions: “Unhappy Hour” by Mohammad-Esmaeil Hajalian and “Mad Saint” by Ahmadreza Amiri-Samani
- Novel: (no winner)
  - Honorable mentions: “Without Father’s Name” by Seyyed Meisam Musavian and “Sad Moon, Red Moon” by Reza Julai
- Literary criticism: (no winner)
  - Honorable mention: “Albert Camus in Iran” co-written by Mohammadreza Farsian and Fatemeh Qaderi
- Documentation and historiography:
  - (joint winner) Meisam Amiri, “Fascinating Grief”
  - (joint winner) Hedayatollah Behbudi, “A Man Named Reza Who Was Then Called Reza Khan”,

2008 For works published in 2005-2006.

- Top winner: (no winner)
- Short story: "Killing Dragons", Yusef Alikhani
- Novel: The Rule of the Game, Firuz Zanuzi Jalali
- Literary criticism: The Mirror’s Rite, "Hossein-Ali Qobadi"
- Documentation and historiography: The National Council of Resistance of Iran (NCRI) from Existence to Extinction, by the Political Studies and Research Institute.

2009

- Top winner: (no winner)
- Novel: Paytakht Hall, Mohammad-Ali Gudni, and Namira ('Immortal'), Sadegh Karamyar (co-winners)
- Literary criticism: Language of Mysticism, Alireza Fuladi, and Theater of Myths, Naghmeh Samini (co-winners)
- Documentation and historiography: One Woman's War: Da (Mother), Seyyedeh Azam Hosseini

2010

- Top winner: (no winner)

2011

- Top winner: The War Road, Mansur Anvari

2012

- Top winner: (no winner)
- Literary criticism: Rumi-Like on the Silent Secrets by Ali Mohammadi Asiabadi and Crimson Wisdom by Taqi Purnamdarian
- Memoir: Noureddin, Son of Iran by Masumeh Sepehri
- Biography: The Biography entitled 'Alef-Laam Khomeini' by Hedayatollah Behbudi Kalhori
- Fiction: Hafez Seven by Akbar Sahraei

2013

- No winner in any categories. However, works were said to be "praiseworthy" for Mahmoud Fotouhi, Sohrab Yazdani, Safaoding Tabraeian and Amir Razagh Zadeh.

2014

2015

- No works in the categories of short story, literary criticism, or documentation were "deemed worthy".
- Novel: Fall Is the Last Season by Nasim Marashi and The Well-Behaved Girl by Shahriar Abbasi shared the Novel prize.

2016

Each winner received 10 Bahar Azadi gold coins.

- Novel: Barren by Mohammadreza Bairami

2017

- Novel: TBD

2018

- Novel: رهش ("Salvation") by Reza Amirkhani

== See also ==
- List of history awards
