= Specialized Library on Islam and Iran =

Library in Qom, Iran

- کتابخانه تخصصی تاریخ اسلام و ایران
- 34.6239239°N 50.8788728°E
- Location: Qom, Iran
- Type: Special library
- Established: October 9, 1995

Collection
- Items collected: History of Iran; History of Islam
- Size: Over 224,000 books and journals

Access and use
- Access requirements: Only specialists in history and related disciplines

Other information
- Director: Rasul Jafarian
- Affiliation: Ali al-Sistani office
- Website: historylib.com

The Specialized Library on Islam and Iran was established on 1995 in Qom, Iran. This library contains resources, especially regarding the history of Iran and history of Islam. The library is the first specialized history library in Iran and the largest specialized history library in the Middle East.

== Historical background ==
The lack of resources in historical fields in the Qom Seminary and the urgent need in this field, led to the establishment of the Specialized library on Islam and Iran based on the two tendencies of Islam and Iran to strengthen and activate discussions and historical studies in October 1995 in Qom, Iran. The Specialized Library on Islam and Iran has undergone alteration during the last 25 years including change the location of the library four times. Over the years, newly published historical works from several international exhibitions in Syria, Egypt and Morocco, Mecca, Medina and Jeddah, and Arab and non-Arab countries has added the library collection.

== Affiliation ==
The Specialized Library on Islam and Iran is affiliated with the office of Ali al-Sistani, which is supervised by Javad Shahrestani. Rasul Jafarian is in charge of managing the library.

== Collection ==
The library was opened with about 4000 books, but now, there are over 224000 books and journals in the collection. Books and magazines in 9 languages (Persian, Arabic, English, French, German, Chinese, Hebrew, Hindi and Istanbul Turkish) are available in the library.

=== Classification ===
The type of classification is thematic in such a way that according to the needs of library users, historical periods and regions are geographically divided and form different themes. In addition, marginal topics are divided according to well-known scientific branches in the history course. So far, the books have been divided into 89 sub-topics including:

1. History of Islam
2. History of Iran
3. Prophetic biography
4. Imams biography
5. Imam Ali
6. Hazrat Fatima
7. Imam Hassan
8. Imam Hussein
9. Imam Sajjad
10. Imam Baqir
11. Imam Sadegh
12. Imam Kazem
13. Imam Reza
14. Imam Javad
15. Imam Hadi
16. Imam Hassan Askari
17. Imam Zaman
18. Azerbaijan
19. Arabic literature
20. Persian literature
21. Professor Jafarian
22. Documents
23. Central Asia
24. Isfahan
25. Afghanistan and India
26. Economy
27. America
28. Genealogy and families
29. Islamic Revolution
30. Imam Khomeini
31. Ancient Iran
32. Baháʼí Faith
33. Pahlavi I
34. Pahlavi II
35. History of Religions
36. History of Europe
37. History of the Prophets
38. History of Shia Islam
39. History of Sufism
40. History of Tehran
41. History of the World
42. History of States
43. History of Iraq
44. History of Science
45. History of Egypt
46. History of the Press
47. Historiography
48. Translation of monographs
49. General Translation
50. Turkey
51. Tehran
52. Arabian Peninsula
53. Geography of Iran
54. General Geography
55. Movements
56. Iran–Iraq War
57. Southern Iran
58. Historical Tales
59. Khorasan and Sistan
60. Caliphate and State
61. Persian Gulf
62. Women
63. Travel literature
64. Levant
65. East Asia
66. Safavid to Zandieh
67. Contemporary Arab
68. Social Sciences
69. Western Iran
70. Culture and Civilization
71. Cultures
72. Palestine
73. Qajar dynasty
74. Caucasus and Russia
75. Qom
76. Bibliography
77. Kurds and Kurdistan
78. Kerman and Yazd
79. African countries
80. Gilan and Mazandaran
81. Latin
82. Magazines
83. Collection and Memoirs
84. Hadith
85. Persian Constitutional Revolution
86. Morocco and Andalusia
87. Unknown
88. National Movement
89. Art

== See also ==
- Mar'ashi Najafi Library
- National Library of Iran
- List of libraries in Iran
