= Reflection on the Ashura movement =

Book about Ashura (Islamic holy event) in Persian language

- Author: Rasul Jafarian
- Original title: تأملی در نهضت عاشورا
- Language: Persian
- Subject: Ashura; Battle of Karbala; Husayn ibn Ali
- Publisher: Ansarian; Movarrekh; Elm
- Publication date: 2001
- Publication place: Iran
- Pages: 380 first edition (2001); 719 last edition (2020)

Reflection on the Ashura movement (Persian: تأملی در نهضت عاشورا) is a Persian book by the Iranian author Rasul Jafarian about the Islamic commemoration Ashura and how the Ashura movement was formed.

A second edition was published in 2020. This new edition contains an introduction and twenty-four topics which are:

It has been criticized and reviewed several times.
