= A Brief History of Blasphemy =

1990 book by Richard Webster

- Cover
- Author: Richard Webster
- Language: English
- Subject: The Satanic Verses controversy
- Publisher: The Orwell Press
- Publication date: 1990
- Publication place: United Kingdom
- Media type: Print (Paperback)
- Pages: 152
- ISBN: 978-0951592205

A Brief History of Blasphemy: Liberalism, Censorship and the Satanic Verses is a 1990 book by Richard Webster, in which the author discusses the controversy over Salman Rushdie's novel The Satanic Verses (1988). Webster critiques the freedom to blaspheme, and argues against The Crime of Blasphemy (which advocated the abolition of Britain's blasphemy laws "without replacement").

== Summary ==
Webster notes that he named the book after the fourth section of The Crime of Blasphemy, a pamphlet issued by the International Committee for the Defence of Salman Rushdie and his Publishers, and that his work is influenced by Karen Armstrong's Holy War (1988) and Norman Cohn's books The Pursuit of the Millennium (1957), Warrant for Genocide (1967), and Europe's Inner Demons (1975). He also approvingly cites Muslim writer Shabbir Akhtar's Be Careful With Muhammad! (1989).

Webster describes A Brief History of Blasphemy as "an attempt to show, without ever aspiring to completeness or comprehensiveness, that the picture of blasphemy which is presented by the authors of the International Committee's document is incomplete, and in some respects, seriously misleading." Webster gives the controversy surrounding Monty Python's film The Life of Brian (1979), which he calls "a rather slight production" as a satire on religion, as an example of the way in which blasphemy has been restrained not by force of law but by internalised censorship.

== Publication history ==
A Brief History of Blasphemy was first published in 1990 by The Orwell Press.

== Reception ==
According to the journalist Bob Woffinden, A Brief History of Blasphemy was widely praised in the immediate aftermath of the controversy over The Satanic Verses. Some reviewers suggested that Webster shows that liberal support for unrestricted freedom of speech is inconsistent with other liberal values, and demonstrates the religious origins of belief in freedom of expression. The book has been described as "thoughtful" and "closely argued" by the journalist Tim Radford, and "energetic and ingenious" by academic Lorna Sage, and Webster has been credited with explaining how "we have internalised puritan iconoclasm to the point where we mistake it for a secular universal truth", and with showing that the western liberal concept of "inner conscience" upon which the secularist arguments of The Crime of Blasphemy were founded is a secular transformation of Puritanism.

Commentators have interpreted A Brief History of Blasphemy as a broadly liberal critique of liberalism, or an attempt to criticize the liberal establishment on its own terms. Webster shows, in Petersson's view, that Rushdie combines a potentially violent and offensive code with the holiest Islamic traditions, and that the language in The Satanic Verses has a charge that he was too careless with. According to Ruvani Ranashina, Webster shows that a civilised society should have constraints on the freedom to act in ways that have adverse effects on others, and that freedom without responsibility is dangerous, especially if offensive and damaging to a community. She believes his critique of the freedom to blaspheme implicitly supports the group of Muslims who unsuccessfully sought to invoke British blasphemy laws that applied only to Christianity against The Satanic Verses in 1989. Webster has been credited by the novelist J. M. Coetzee with showing that "Rushdie has been made to stand for an entire intellectual establishment" that compounded the outrage The Satanic Verses caused to Muslims by celebrating it. His criticism of The Crime of Blasphemy (which advocated the abolition of Britain's blasphemy laws "without replacement") is seen as convincing by academic Jim McGuigan. French author Patrice Dartevielle described Webster's work as "anti-liberal" and condemned support for "repressive legislation" (i.e. new or renewed blasphemy laws), while also acknowledging that Webster's concern about Muslims was "noble".

Rowan Williams, the Archbishop of Canterbury, in the James Callaghan Memorial lecture "Religious Hatred and Religious Offence" delivered in January 2008, called the book "immensely intelligent", stating that Webster shows that absolute freedom of speech is neither desirable nor possible. Williams said that Webster "offers some extraordinary examples of 'liberal' aggression and ignorant bigotry" during the controversy over The Satanic Verses in 1989 and 1990, and that he approved of his argument that writers and dramatists who defend the right to offend religion show a lack of imagination, in that they fail to understand the possibility that offending religion may cause real mental suffering.

== See also ==
- Religious offence
