= John Shelton Curtiss =

American historian (1899–1983)

- Born: July 15, 1899; Buffalo, New York, US
- Died: December 27, 1983 (aged 84); Honolulu, Hawaii, US
- Education: Princeton University: B.A. & Ph.D. in History, Columbia University
- Occupations: Historian, professor
- Employer: Duke University: 1947 to 1969;
- Title: James B. Duke Professor at Duke University
- Spouse: Edna Sutter Curtiss
- Children: Anne Curtiss Fong and John Sutter Curtiss
- Parent(s): Harlow Clarke Curtiss and Ethel (Mann) Curtiss

John Shelton Curtiss (July 15, 1899 – December 27, 1983) was an American historian of Russia and historical scholar of old Yankee descent. Curtiss was a longtime professor of history at Duke University.

== Early life and education ==
John Shelton Curtiss was born in Buffalo, New York, the son of prominent attorney, Harlow Clarke Curtiss and his socialite wife, Ethel (Mann) Curtiss. His maternal grandfather was Dr. Matthew D. Mann.

In 1921 Curtiss received his bachelor's degree from Princeton University, where he had been an oarsman on its undefeated crew team.

In 1925 he decided to do graduate work in history at Columbia University. His first published work appears to have been his 1933 article Sloops of the Hudson, 1800–1850. He taught at Brooklyn College from 1933 to 1936 as well as at Columbia from 1934 to 1936. After teaching himself Russian as a graduate student, he made his first of many trips to the Soviet Union in 1934. He completed his Ph.D. in Russian history at Columbia in 1939.

== Career ==
After receiving his Ph.D. in 1939, Curtiss was hired by President Franklin D. Roosevelt to be an archivist at his library at Hyde Park. Among Curtiss' responsibilities there was to oversee FDRs ship model collection.

After World War II began, Curtiss was called to Washington, D.C. along with other Slavic experts to do classified work in the Research and Analysis Branch of the Office of Strategic Services (OSS). After finishing his wartime work in 1945, he joined the history department at Duke University where he remained for the rest of his career. From 1946 to 1948, he was also a fellow of the Russian Institute at Columbia. In 1954 he received a Guggenheim Fellowship in Russian history. In 1966 he was designated James B. Duke Professor of history.

== His work on debunking the Protocols ==
During World War II, in 1941 and 1942, while Jews were being, or about to be, exterminated by the Nazis in Europe, Curtiss published his 118-page monograph denying the truth and authenticity of the so-called Protocols of the Elders of Zion, years before Norman Cohn published his work on the subject, Warrant for Genocide (1967). Curtiss's work was endorsed by thirteen American historians, as attested to in the work's Foreword. The book concluded that the Protocols of Zion are, "beyond doubt," a "rank and pernicious forgery."

== Marriage and later life ==
John Shelton Curtiss married Edna Sutter on September 21, 1925, in Buffalo, New York. She died May 22, 1981, in Durham, North Carolina. They had two children, Anne Curtiss Fong and John Sutter Curtiss (1928–2015). After his wife's death, he moved to Honolulu, Hawaii to live with his daughter and her family. He died December 27, 1983, in Honolulu.

== Works ==
In 1940 Curtiss received the Herbert Baxter Adams Prize from the American Historical Association for Church and State in Russia, 1900–1917. Curtiss also wrote The Peasant in nineteenth-century Russia with Wayne S. Vucinich.

- "Sloops of the Hudson, 1800–1850", in New York History, vol. 14, no. 1, January 1933 p. 61-73, quarterly journal of the New York State Historical Association
- An Appraisal of the "Protocols of Zion", (New York: Columbia University Press, 1942)
- Russian church and the Soviet state 1917–1950 (1953)
- Russian revolutions of 1917 (1957)
- Essays in Russian and Soviet History, in Honor of Geroid Tanquary Robinson:(New York: Columbia Univ Press, 1963):ISBN 0-231-02521-1 (0-231-02521-1)
- Church and state in Russia (1965)
- Essays in Russian and Soviet history (1965)
- Russian Army under Nicholas I, 1825–1855 (1965)
- Russian church and the Soviet state 1917–1950 (1965)
- Peasant in nineteenth-century Russia, edited by Wayne S. Vucinich, Contributors: John S. Curtiss [and others] (1968)
- Russia's Crimean War (1979)
- Russian revolutions of 1917 (1982)

== See also ==
- Harlow C. Curtiss Building, named for his father

== Sources ==
- Warrant for Genocide, Norman Cohn (London: [1967] 1996).
