= Satanic Verses controversy =

Reaction to Salman Rushdie's 1988 novel

Satanic Verses controversy

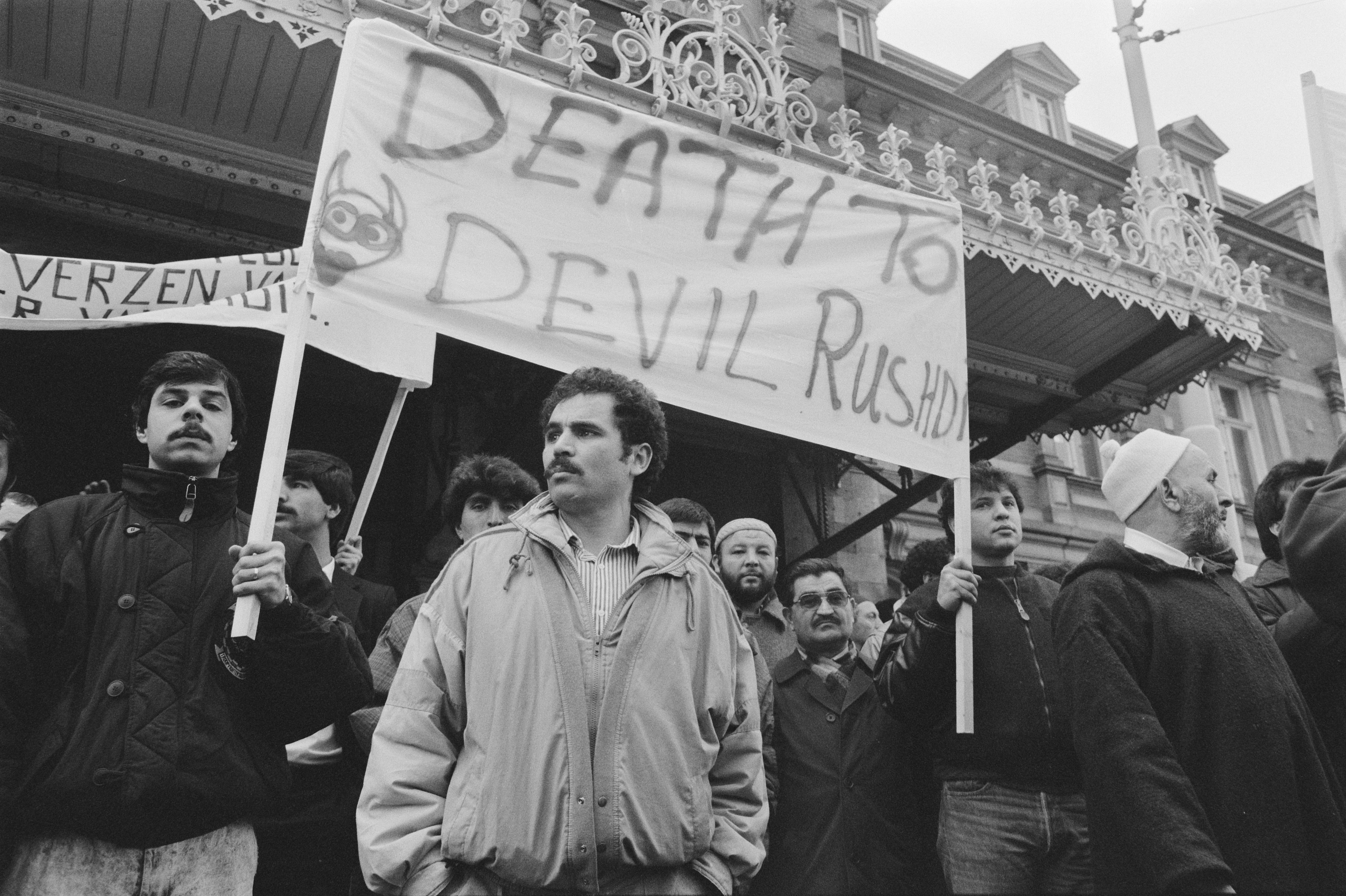
Protests against "The Satanic Verses" in the Netherlands.

The Satanic Verses controversy, also known as the Rushdie Affair, was a controversy sparked by the 1988 publication of The Satanic Verses by the Indian born British-American author Salman Rushdie. It centred on the novel's references to the Satanic Verses (apocryphal verses of the Quran), and came to include a larger debate about censorship and religious violence. It included numerous killings, attempted killings (including against Rushdie himself), and bombings by perpetrators who supported Islam.

The affair had a notable impact on geopolitics when Ruhollah Khomeini, Supreme Leader of Iran, issued a fatwa in 1989 ordering Muslims to kill Rushdie. The Iranian government has changed its support for the fatwa several times, including in 1998 when Mohammad Khatami said the regime no longer supported it. In 2017, a statement was published on the official website of then-supreme leader Ayatollah Khamenei, stating that "the decree is as Imam Khomeini (ra) issued" and in February 2019, the Khamenei.ir Twitter account stated that Khomeini's verdict was "solid and irrevocable".

The issue was said to have divided "Muslims from Westerners along the fault line of culture", and to have pitted a core Western value of freedom of expression – that no one "should be killed, or face a serious threat of being killed, for what they say or write" – against the view of some Muslims that non-Muslims should not be free to disparage the "honour of the Prophet" or indirectly criticise Islam through satire – and that religious violence is appropriate in contemporary history in order to defend Islam and Muhammad. British writer Hanif Kureishi called the fatwa "one of the most significant events in postwar literary history".

== Background ==
Even before the publication of The Satanic Verses, the books of Salman Rushdie had stoked controversy. Rushdie saw his role as a writer "as including the function of antagonist to the state". His second book Midnight's Children angered Indira Gandhi because it seemed to suggest "that Mrs. Gandhi was responsible for the death of her husband through neglect". His 1983 roman à clef Shame "took an aim on Pakistan, its political characters, its culture and its religion... [It covered] a central episode in Pakistan's internal life, which portrays as a family squabble between Iskander Harappa (Zulfikar Ali Bhutto) and his successor and executioner Raza Hyder (Zia ul-Haq)... 'The Virgin Ironpants'... has been identified as Benazir Bhutto, a Prime Minister of Pakistan".

Positions Rushdie took as a committed leftist prior to the publication of his book were the source of some controversy. He defended many of those who would later attack him during the controversy. Rushdie forcefully denounced the Shah's government and supported the Islamic Revolution of Iran, at least in its early stages. He condemned the US bombing raid on Tripoli in 1986 but found himself threatened by Libya's leader Muammar al-Gaddafi three years later. He wrote a book bitterly critical of US foreign policy in general and its war in Nicaragua in particular, for example calling the United States government, "the bandit posing as sheriff". After the Ayatollah's fatwa, however, he was accused by the Iranian government of being "an inferior CIA agent".

== Controversial elements of The Satanic Verses ==
The title The Satanic Verses immediately sparked vehement protest against Rushdie's book. The title refers to a legend of Muhammad; a few verses were supposedly spoken by him as part of the Qur'an which praised the pagan goddesses of Al-Lat, Al-Uzza, and Manat. The verses were then withdrawn on the grounds that the devil had sent them to deceive Muhammad into thinking they came from God. These "Satanic Verses" are said to have been revealed between verses 20 and 21 in Surah An-Najm of the Qur'an, and feature in accounts by Al-Tabari and Ibn Ishaq. The verses also appear in other accounts of the prophet's life. Verse 23 in Surah An-Najm implies that the Satanic Verses were fabricated by the forefathers of idolaters.

The utterance and withdrawal of the so-called Satanic Verses forms an important sub-plot in the novel, which recounts several episodes in the life of Muhammad. The phrase Arab historians and later Muslims used to describe the incident of the withdrawn verses was not "Satanic verses", but the gharaniq verses; the phrase "Satanic verses" was unknown to Muslims, and was coined by Orientalist Western academics specialising in the study of cultures considered eastern. The story itself is not found in the six Sahih of the Sunni or the Shiite sources, so much so that Muraghi, in his commentary, says: "These traditions are undoubtedly a fabrication of the heretics and foreign hands, and have not been found in any of the authentic books". According to Daniel Pipes, when attention was drawn to a book with this title, "Muslims found [it] incredibly sacrilegious", and took it to imply that the book's author claimed that verses of the Qur'an were "the work of the Devil".

According to McRoy (2007), other controversial elements included the use of the name Mahound, said to be a derogatory term for Muhammad used by the English during the Crusades; the use of the term Jahilia, denoting the "time of ignorance" before Islam, for the holy city of Mecca; the use of the name of the Angel Gibreel (Gabriel) for a film star, of the name of Saladin, the well known Muslim military leader during the Crusades, for a devil, and the name of Ayesha, the wife of Muhammad, for a fanatical Indian girl who leads her village on a fatal pilgrimage. Moreover, the brothel of the city of Jahiliyyah was staffed by prostitutes with the same names as Muhammad's wives, who are viewed by Muslims as "the Mothers of all Believers".

Other issues many Muslims have found offensive include Abraham being called a "bastard" for casting Hagar and Ishmael in the desert; and a character named Salman the Persian who serves as one of the Prophet's scribes, an apparent reference to the story, controversial among Muslims, of a Meccan convert by the name of Abd Allah ibn Sa'd, who left Islam after the Prophet failed to notice small changes he had made in the dictation of the Qur'an.

Daniel Pipes identified other more general issues in the book likely to have angered pious Muslims: A complaint in the book by one of the character's companions: "rules about every damn thing, if a man farts, let him turn his face to the wind, a rule about which hand to use for the purpose of cleaning one's behind ...", which was said to mix up "Islamic law with its opposite and with the author's whimsy"; the prophet of Rushdie's novel, as he lies dying, being visited in a dream by the Goddess Al-Lat, on the grounds that this suggested either that she exists or that the prophet thought she did; the angel Gibreel's vision of the Supreme Being in another dream as "not abstract in the least. He saw, sitting on the bed, a man of about the same age as himself", balding, wearing glasses and "seeming to suffer from dandruff". A complaint by one of the characters about communal violence in India: "Fact is, religious faith, which encodes the highest aspirations of human race, is now, in our country, the servant of lowest instincts, and God is the creature of evil".

The Guardian newspaper published on 14 September 2012 a series of recollections of various British people involved in the controversy. Lisa Appignanesi, ex-president of English PEN, observed "Intransigence is never so great as when it feels it has a god on its side." One of the lawyers involved, Geoffrey Robertson QC, rehearsed the arguments and replies made when 13 Muslim barristers had lodged a formal indictment against Rushdie for the crime of blasphemous libel: it was said that God was described in the book as "the Destroyer of Man", yet he is described as such in the Old Testament and the Book of Revelation, especially of men who are unbelievers or enemies of the Jews; that the book contained criticisms of the prophet Abraham, yet the Islamic, Christian and Jewish traditions themselves see Abraham as not without fault and deserving of criticism; that Rushdie referred to Mohammed as "Mahound", a conjurer, a magician and a false prophet, yet these remarks are made by a drunken apostate, a character with whom neither reader nor author has any sympathy; that the book insults the wives of the Prophet by having whores use their names, yet the wives are explicitly said to be chaste and the adoption of their names by whores is to symbolise the corruption of the city then being described (perhaps symbolising Mecca in its pre-Islamic state); that the book vilified the companions of the Prophet, calling them "bums from Persia" and "clowns", yet the character saying this is a hack poet hired to write propaganda against the Prophet and does not reflect the author's beliefs; that the book criticised Islam for having too many rules and seeking to control every aspect of life, yet while characters in the book do make such remarks these cannot constitute blasphemy since they do not vilify God or the Prophet.

== Early reaction ==
Before the publication of The Satanic Verses, the publisher received "warnings from the publisher's editorial consultant" that the book might be controversial. Later, Rushdie would reflect upon the time that the book was about to be published. Speaking to an interviewer, he said, "I expected a few mullahs would be offended, call me names, and then I could defend myself in public... I honestly never expected anything like this".

The Satanic Verses was published by Viking Penguin on 26 September 1988 in the UK, and on 22 February 1989 in the US. Upon its publication the book garnered considerable critical acclaim in the United Kingdom. On 8 November 1988, the work received the Whitbread Award for novel of the year, worth £20,000. According to one observer, "almost all the British book reviewers" were unaware of the book's connection to Islam because Rushdie has used the name Mahound instead of Muhammad for his chapter on Islam.

=== Muslim response and book bannings ===
After the book was first published in the United Kingdom (in September 1988), there were protests by Muslims that predominantly took place in India and the UK. When the book was published in February 1989 in the United States, it received renewed attention, and worldwide protests began to take a more violent form.

In Islamic communities, the novel became instantly controversial, because of what some Muslims considered blasphemous references. Rushdie was accused of misusing freedom of speech. By October 1988, letters and phone calls arrived at Viking Penguin from Muslims, angry with the book and demanding that it be withdrawn. Before the end of the month, the import of the book was banned in India, although possession of the book is not a criminal offence.

In November 1988, it was also banned in Bangladesh, Sudan, and South Africa. By December 1988, it was also banned in Sri Lanka. In March 1989, it was banned in Malaysia, followed by Brunei in the same year.

In Britain, on 2 December 1988, 7,000 Muslims in the town of Bolton staged the first ever demonstration against The Satanic Verses. After the Friday prayers, a certain section of the congregation marched from the Deobandi run Zakariyya Jame Masjid to the town centre and then burned the book. The organisers claimed "It was a peaceful protest, and we burned the book to try and attract public attention".

The City of Bradford gained international attention in January 1989 when some of its members organized a public book-burning of The Satanic Verses, evoking as the journalist Robert Winder recalled "images of medieval (not to mention Nazi) intolerance".

In February, when the US edition was published, a new round of reviews and criticism began. March 1989 saw it banned in Kenya, Thailand, Tanzania, Indonesia, and Singapore. The last nation to ban the book was Venezuela, in June 1989.

On 12 February 1989, a 10,000-strong protest against Rushdie and the book took place in Islamabad, Pakistan. Six protesters were killed in an attack on the American Cultural Center, and an American Express office was ransacked.

==== Attacks ====
In the United States, the FBI was notified of 78 threats to bookstores in early March 1989, thought to be a small proportion of the total number of threats. The bookstore chain B. Dalton, for instance, received 30 threats in less than three hours. Bombings of book stores included two in Berkeley, California. In New York, the office of a community newspaper, The Riverdale Press, was all but destroyed by firebombs following the publication of an editorial defending the right to read the novel and criticising the bookstores that pulled it from their shelves. But the United Kingdom was the country where violence against bookstores occurred most often and persisted the longest. Two large bookstores in Charing Cross Road, London, (Collets and Dillons) were bombed on 9 April. In May, explosions went off in the town of High Wycombe and again in London, on Kings Road. Other bombings included one at a large London department store (Liberty's), in connection with the Penguin Bookshop inside the store, and at the Penguin store in York. Unexploded devices were found at Penguin stores in Guildford, Nottingham, and Peterborough.

In the United States, it was unavailable in about one-third of bookstores. In many others that carried the book, it was kept under the counter.

== Fatwa by Ayatollah Khomeini ==
On 14 February 1989, Ayatollah Ruhollah Khomeini, the Supreme Leader of Iran and one of the most prominent Shi'a Muslim leaders, issued a fatwa calling for the death of Rushdie and his publishers. This created a major international incident that persisted for many years.

Broadcast on Iranian radio, the judgement read:

We are from Allah and to Allah we shall return. I am informing all brave Muslims of the world that the author of The Satanic Verses, a text written, edited, and published against Islam, the Prophet of Islam, and the Qur'an, along with all the editors and publishers aware of its contents, are condemned to death. I call on all valiant Muslims wherever they may be in the world to kill them without delay, so that no one will dare insult the sacred beliefs of Muslims henceforth. And whoever is killed in this cause will be a martyr, Allah willing. Meanwhile, if someone has access to the author of the book but is incapable of carrying out the execution, he should inform the people so that [Rushdie] is punished for his actions.

— Rouhollah al-Mousavi al-Khomeini.

Khomeini did not give a legal reasoning for his judgement. It is thought to be based on the ninth chapter of the Qur'an, called At-Tawba, verse 61: "Some of them hurt the prophet by saying, 'He is all ears!' Say, 'It is better for you that he listens to you. He believes in God, and trusts the believers. He is a mercy for those among you who believe.' Those who hurt God's messenger have incurred a painful retribution". However it was not explained how that chapter could support such a judgement.

Over the next few days, Iranian officials offered a bounty of $6 million for killing Rushdie, who was thus forced to live under police protection for the next nine years. On 7 March 1989, the United Kingdom and Iran broke diplomatic relations over the Rushdie controversy.

=== Rushdie's apology and reaction ===
==== Rushdie's apology ====
On 18 February, Iran's President Ali Khamenei (who would later that year succeed Khomeini as Supreme Leader) suggested that if Rushdie "apologises and disowns the book, people may forgive him". Following this, Rushdie issued "a carefully worded statement", saying:

I recognize that Muslims in many parts of the world are genuinely distressed by the publication of my novel. I profoundly regret the distress the publication has occasioned to the sincere followers of Islam. Living as we do in a world of many faiths, this experience has served to remind us that we must all be conscious of the sensibilities of others.

This was relayed to the Ministry of Foreign Affairs in Tehran "via official channels" before being released to the press.

==== Rejection of Rushdie's apology ====
On 19 February 1989, Ayatollah Khomeini's office replied:

The imperialist foreign media falsely alleged that the officials of the Islamic Republic have said the sentence of death on the author of The Satanic Verses will be retracted if he repents. Imam Khomeini has said: This is denied 100%. Even if Salman Rushdie repents and become the most pious man of all time, it is incumbent on every Muslim to employ everything he has got, his life and wealth, to send him to Hell.

Khomeini added:

If a non-Muslim becomes aware of Rushdie's whereabouts and has the ability to execute him quicker than Muslims, it is incumbent on Muslims to pay a reward or a fee in return for this action.

In a 2007 article, journalist Anthony McRoy theorized that Khomeini refused the apology on the basis of an interpretation of the Islamic law posited by Al-Shafi'i, a 9th century jurist, who, in his Risala (Maliki Manual 37.19 Crimes Against Islam), ruled that an "apostate is also killed unless he repents... Whoever abuses the Messenger of God ... is to be executed, and his repentance is not accepted".

=== Support for Khomeini's fatwa ===
In Britain, the Union of Islamic Students' Associations in Europe, which is the largest collective of Islamic Students in Europe, issued a statement offering to commit murder for Khomeini. Despite incitement to murder being illegal in the United Kingdom, one London property developer told reporters, "If I see him, I will kill him straight away. Take my name and address. One day I will kill him".

Despite supporting the fatwa, some other leaders claimed that British Muslims were not allowed to carry out the fatwa themselves in order to avoid violating the law of a land in which they are a minority, and that only outside Muslims had an obligation to carry out the fatwa. Proponents of this view included the Muslim Parliament and its leader Kalim Siddiqui (who later said he believed he may have been "partially responsible" for getting Khomeini to issue the fatwa). After Siddiqui's death in 1996, however, his successor Ghayasuddin Siddiqui renewed support for the fatwa. His support for the fatwa continued, even after the President of Iran said his government would not pursue—though also not withdraw—the fatwa. and reiterated his support in 2000.

Meanwhile, in America, the director of the Near East Studies Center at UCLA, George Sabbagh, told an interviewer that Khomeini was "completely within his rights" to call for Rushdie's death.

In May 1989 in Beirut, Lebanon, British citizen Jackie Mann was abducted "in response to Iran's fatwa against Salman Rushdie for the publication of The Satanic Verses and more specifically, for his refuge and protection in the United Kingdom". He joined several Westerners held hostage there. Two months earlier a photograph of three teachers held hostage was released by Islamic Jihad for the Liberation of Palestine with the message that it "would take revenge against" all institutions and organisations that insulted in one way or another "members of the Prophet Mohammed's family".

=== Criticism of Khomeini's fatwa ===
Khomeini's fatwa was condemned across the Western world by governments on the grounds that it violated the universal human rights of free speech, freedom of religion, and that Khomeini had no right to condemn to death a citizen of another country living in that country. The twelve members of the European Economic Community removed their ambassadors from Tehran for three weeks.

==== On Islamic grounds ====
In addition to criticism of the death sentence on the basis of human rights, the sentence was also criticised on Islamic grounds. According to Bernard Lewis, a death warrant without trial, defence and other legal aspects of sharia violates Islamic jurisprudence. In Islamic fiqh, apostasy by a mentally sound adult male is a capital crime. For Lewis, fiqh also "lays down procedures according to which a person accused of an offense is to be brought to trial, confronted with his accuser, and given the opportunity to defend himself." Lewis added that "[a] judge will then give a verdict and if he finds the accused guilty, pronounce sentence", and that "[e]ven the most rigorous and extreme of the classical jurists only require a Muslim to kill anyone who insults the Prophet in his hearing and in his presence. They say nothing about a hired killing for a reported insult in a distant country."

Other Islamic scholars outside Iran took issue with the fact that the sentence was not passed by an Islamic court, or that it did not limit its "jurisdiction only [to] countries under Islamic law". Muhammad Hussam al Din, a theologian at Al-Azhar University, argued "Blood must not be shed except after a trial [when the accused has been] given a chance to defend himself and repent". Abdallah al-Mushidd, head of Azhar's Fatwā Council stated "We must try the author in a legal fashion as Islam does not accept killing as a legal instrument".

The Islamic Jurisprudence Academy in Mecca urged that Rushdie be tried, and if found guilty, be given a chance to repent (p. 93), and Ayatollah Mehdi Rohani, head of the Shi'i community in Europe and a cousin of Khomeini, criticised Khomeini for 'respecting neither international law nor that of Islam.' There was also criticism of the fatwa issued against Rushdie's publishers. According to Daniel Pipes, the Sharia "clearly establishes that disseminating false information is not the same as expressing it. 'Transmitting blasphemy is not blasphemy' (naql al-kufr laysa kufr)." In addition, the publishers were not Muslim and so could not be "sentenced under the Islamic laws of apostasy". If there was another legal justification for sentencing them to death, "Khomeini failed to provide" it.

Iran's response to calls for a trial was to denounce its Islamic proponents as "deceitful". President Khomeini accused them of attempting to use religious law as "a flag under which they can crush revolutionary Islam".

==== Questions of political motivation ====
Some speculate that the fatwa (or at least the reaffirmation of the death threat four days later) was issued with motives other than a sense of duty to protect Islam by punishing blasphemy/apostasy. Namely:

- To divide Muslims from the West by "starkly highlight[ing] the conflicting political and intellectual traditions" of the two civilisations. Khomeini had often warned Muslims of the dangers of the West – "the agents of imperialism [who] are busy in every corner of the Islamic world drawing our youth away from us with their evil propaganda". He knew from news reports the book was already rousing the anger of Muslims.
- To distract the attention of his Iranian countrymen from his capitulation seven months earlier to a truce with Iraq (20 July 1988) ending the long and bloody Iran–Iraq War (a truce Iraq would have eagerly given him six years and hundreds of thousands of lives earlier), and strengthen the revolutionary ardour and morale of Iranians worn down by the bloodshed and privation of that war. According to journalist Robin Wright, "as the international furor grew, Khomeini declared that the book had been a 'godsend' that had helped Iran out of a 'naïve foreign policy'".
- To win back the interest in and support for the Islamic Revolution among the 90% of the population of the Muslim world that was Sunni, rather than (Twelver) Shia like Khomeini. The Iran–Iraq War had also alienated Sunni, who not only were offended by its bloodshed, but tended to favour Iran's Sunni-led opponent, Iraq. At least one observer speculated that Khomeini's choice of the issue of disrespect for the Prophet Muhammad was a particularly shrewd tactic, as Sunni were inclined to suspect Shia of being more interested in the Imams Ali and Husayn ibn Ali than in the Prophet.
- To steal the thunder of Khomeini's two least favourite enemy states, Saudi Arabia and the United States, who were basking in the glory of the Soviet withdrawal from Afghanistan. This withdrawal, seen by many as a great victory of Islamic faith over an atheist superpower, was made possible by billions of dollars in aid to the Afghan mujahideen by those two countries. Khomeini issued the fatwa on 14 February 1989. The next day came the official announcement of the completion of the Soviet withdrawal from Afghanistan, lost in the news cycle of the fatwa.
- To gain the upper hand from Saudi Arabia in the struggle for international leadership of the Muslim world. Each led rival blocs of international institutions and media networks, and "the Saudi government, it should be remembered, had led the anti-Rushdie campaign for months". Unlike the more conservative Saudi Arabia, however, Iran was ideologically and militantly anti-western and could take a more militant stand outside international law.

==== Questions of personal motivation ====
Despite claims by Iranian officials that "Rushdie's book did not insult Iran or Iranian leaders" and so they had no selfish personal motivation to attack the book, the book does include an eleven-page sketch of Khomeini's stay in Paris that could well be considered an insult to him. It describes him as having "grown monstrous, lying in the palace forecourt with his mouth yawning open at the gates; as the people march through the gates he swallows them whole". In the words of one observer, "If this is not an insult, Khomeini was far more tolerant than one might suppose". John Crowley has noted that the section of the book depicting the Khomeini-like character was selected to be read publicly by Rushdie in the promotional events leading up to and following the book's release. In Crowley's opinion, the fatwa was most likely declared because of this section of the novel and its public exposure, rather than the overall parodic treatment of Islam.

=== Attempts to revoke the fatwa ===
On 24 September 1998, as a precondition to the restoration of diplomatic relations with Britain, the Iranian government, then headed by reformist Muhammad Khatami, gave a public commitment that it would "neither support nor hinder assassination operations on Rushdie". In early 2005, Khomeini's fatwa was reaffirmed by Iran's Supreme Leader, Ayatollah Ali Khamenei, in a message to Muslim pilgrims making the annual pilgrimage to Mecca. Additionally, the Revolutionary Guards have declared that the death sentence on him is still valid.

On 14 February 2006, Iran Focus quoted the opinion of "Martyrs Foundation" (as broadcast on the "Iranian state news agency") that the fatwa will remain in place permanently. This contradicts Shiite tradition, in which a fatwa expires when the issuing marja' dies, requiring another living marja' to reissue it.

In 2007, Salman Rushdie reported that he still receives a "sort of Valentine's card" from Iran each year on 14 February letting him know the country has not forgotten the vow to kill him. He was also quoted saying, "It's reached the point where it's a piece of rhetoric rather than a real threat".

== Assassination attempts ==
Following the fatwa issued by Khomeini in 1989, several assassination and assassination attempts were carried out around the world. On 13 July 1991, Hitoshi Igarashi, the Japanese translator of Salman Rushdie’s "The Satanic Verses", was found stabbed to death in his office at the University of Tsukuba, discovered by a cleaning staff member. Just ten days earlier, on 3 July, Rushdie’s Italian translator, Ettore Capriolo, had been brutally attacked and seriously wounded in his Milan apartment after being stabbed multiple times.

Two years later, on 11 October 1993, William Nygaard, the Norwegian publisher of "The Satanic Verses", was shot three times in the back outside his Oslo home. He survived the assassination attempt but spent several months in recovery.

In another violent episode linked to the book, Turkish translator Aziz Nesin narrowly escaped death on 2 July 1993, when a mob of arsonists targeted the Madımak Hotel in Sivas, where he was staying. The attackers, incited following Friday prayers, set fire to the building, killing 37 people—primarily Alevi intellectuals, poets, and musicians. Nesin survived because the crowd failed to identify him early on.

=== 2022 attempt ===
On August 12, 2022 at around 10:47 a.m. EDT, a man stabbed Salman Rushdie as he was about to give a public lecture on the US as safe haven for exiled writers at the Chautauqua Institution in Chautauqua, New York. The assailant stabbed him ten times, straining to continue the attack even as several people held him back. One of these people was the co-founder of City of Asylum, Henry Reese, onstage at the time, about to begin interviewing Rushdie. During the assault, Reese sustained a shallow knife wound and deep bruising in the vicinity of his right eye. A doctor, who was present for the lecture, immediately tended to Rushdie. Rushdie suffered four wounds to the stomach area of his abdomen, three wounds to the right side of the front part of his neck, one wound to his right eye, one wound to his chest and one wound to his right thigh. A 24-year-old suspect, Hadi Matar, was arrested at the scene, and was charged the following day with assault and attempted murder. Rushdie was heavily wounded and hospitalized.

The government of Iran denied having foreknowledge of the stabbing, although Iranian state-controlled media celebrated it.

== Social and political fallout ==
One of the immediate consequences of the fatwa was a worsening of Islamic-Western relations.

=== Heightened tension ===
Rushdie lamented that the controversy fed the Western stereotype of "the backward, cruel, rigid Muslim, burning books and threatening to kill the blasphemer", while another British writer compared the Ayatollah Khomeini "with a familiar ghost from the past – one of those villainous Muslim clerics, a Faqir of Ipi or a mad Mullah, who used to be portrayed, larger than life, in popular histories of the British Empire". Media expressions of this included a banner headline in the popular British newspaper the Daily Mirror referring to Khomeini as "that Mad Mullah".

The Independent newspaper worried that Muslim book burning demonstrations were "following the example of the Inquisition and Hitler's National Socialists", and that if Rushdie was killed, "it would be the first burning of a heretic in Europe in two centuries". Peregrine Worsthorne of The Sunday Telegraph feared that with Europe's growing Muslim population, "Islamic fundamentalism is rapidly growing into a much bigger threat of violence and intolerance than anything emanating from, say, the fascist National Front; and a threat, moreover, infinitely more difficult to contain since it is virtually impossible to monitor, let alone stamp out ...".

On the Muslim side, the Iranian government saw the book as part of a British conspiracy against Islam. It broke diplomatic relations with UK on 7 March 1989 giving the explanation that "in the past two centuries Britain has been in the frontline of plots and treachery against Islam and Muslims". It accused the British of sponsoring Rushdie's book to use it as a political and cultural tactic on earlier military plots that no longer worked. It also saw itself as the victor of the controversy, with the European Community countries capitulating under Iranian pressure. "When Europeans saw that their economic interests in Muslim countries could be damaged, they began to correct their position on the issue of the insulting book. Every official started to condemn the book in one way or another. When they realised that Iran's reaction, its breaking of diplomatic relations with London, could also include them, they quickly sent back their ambassadors to Tehran to prevent further Iranian reaction".

=== Book sales ===
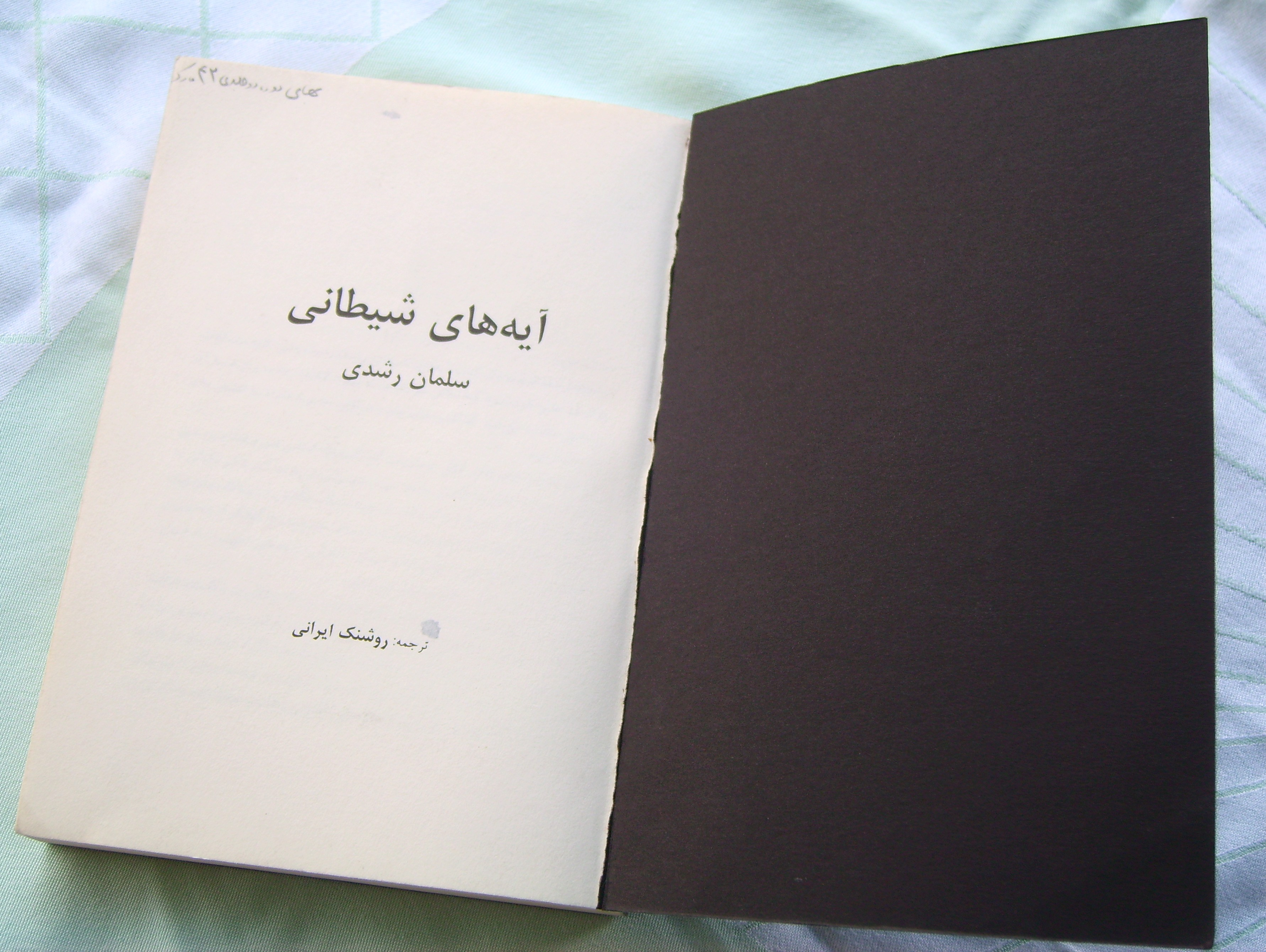
Persian contraband edition of Salman Rushdie's Satanic Verses c. 2000

Although British bookseller W.H. Smith sold "a mere hundred copies" within a week of the book's release in mid-January 1989, it "flew off the shelves" following the fatwa. In America, it sold an "unprecedented" five times more copies than the number two book, Star by Danielle Steel, selling more than 750,000 copies of the book by May 1989. B. Dalton, a bookstore chain that decided not to stock the book for security reasons, changed its mind when it found the book "was selling so fast that even as we tried to stop it, it was flying off the shelves". Rushdie earned about $2 million within the first year of the book's publication, and the book is Viking's all-time best seller.

=== Rushdie ===
The author of the book himself was not immediately killed or injured as many militants wished, but visibly frustrated by a life locked in 24-hour armed guard – alternately defiant against his would-be killers and attempting overtures of reconciliation against the death threat. A week after the death threat, and after his unsuccessful apology to the Iranian government, Rushdie described succumbing to "a curious lethargy, the soporific torpor that overcomes ... while under attack"; then, a couple of weeks after that, wrote a poem vowing "not to shut up" but "to sing on, in spite of attacks".

His wife, Marianne Wiggins, reported that in the first few months following the fatwa the couple moved 56 times, once every three days. In late July, Rushdie separated from Wiggins, "the tension of being at the centre of an international controversy, and the irritations of spending all hours of the day together in seclusion", being too much for their "shaky" relationship.

Late the next year, Rushdie declared, "I want to reclaim my life", and in December signed a declaration "affirming his Islamic faith and calling for Viking-Penguin, the publisher of The Satanic Verses, neither to issue the book in paperback nor to allow it to be translated". This also failed to move supporters of the fatwa and by mid-2005 Rushdie was condemning Islamic fundamentalism as a

... project of tyranny and unreason which wishes to freeze a certain view of Islamic culture in time and silence the progressive voices in the Muslim world calling for a free and prosperous future. ... along comes 9/11, and now many people say that, in hindsight, the fatwa was the prologue and this is the main event.

A memoir of his years of hiding, titled Joseph Anton, was published on 18 September 2012. Joseph Anton was Rushdie's secret alias.

=== Explanation of different reactions ===
==== Muslim ====
The passionate international rage of Muslims towards the book surprised many Western readers because the book was written in English, not Arabic, Urdu, Persian, Turkish or other languages that are spoken in Muslim-majority countries; it was never published or even sold in the countries where most Muslims lived, and was a work of fiction – a demanding, densely written novel unlikely to appeal to the average reader.

Some of the explanations for the unprecedented rage unleashed against the book were that:

- Rushdie was living in the West and ought to be setting a good example for Islam and not siding "with the Orientalists".
- The view of many Muslims was that "Rushdie has portrayed the prophet of Islam as a brothel keeper". "Rushdie accuses the prophet, particularly Muhammad of being like prostitutes": "all who pray are sons of whores". "The Prophet's wives are portrayed as women of the street, his homes as a public brothel and his companions as bandits". The book, in fact, portrays prostitutes who "had each assumed the identity of one of Mahound's wives".
- Belief that fictional elements of the novel were not flights of imagination but lies. Complaints included that it was "neither a critical appraisal nor a piece of historical research", that the novel failed to rely on "scientific and logical arguments", its "lack of scientific, accurate or objective methods of research", "unfounded lies", not being "serious or scientific", "a total distortion of historical facts", being "not at all an objective or scientific opinion".
- Rejection of the concept of free speech. The belief among many Muslims in or from the Middle East is that every country "has ... laws that prohibits any publications or utterances that tend to ridicule or defame Islam".
- A belief held by many Muslims that Britain, America and other Western countries are engaged in a war against Islam and what might on the surface appear to be the product of the imagination of an individual iconoclast author was actually a conspiracy on a national or transnational scale. Then Iranian president Akbar Hashemi Rafsanjani, for example, explained the alleged historical roots of the Rushdie book in a broadcast on Radio Tehran: "Whoever is familiar with the history of colonialism and the Islamic world knows that whenever they wanted to get a foothold in a place, the first thing they did in order to clear their paths – whether overtly or covertly – was to undermine the people's genuine Islamic morals" and claimed an unnamed British foreign secretary once told the British parliament, "So long as the Qur'an is revered by Muslims, we will not be able to consolidate a foothold among the Muslims".
- A campaign by the international Islamist group Jamaat-e-Islami in retaliation for Rushdie's satire of them in the earlier book Shame. In Britain, the group was represented by the UK Action Committee on Islamic Affairs.
- Among second generation Muslim immigrants in UK and elsewhere, a decline in interest in universalist "white Left" anti-racist/anti-imperialist politics, and rise in identity politics with its focus on the "defence of values and beliefs" of Muslim identity.

==== Western mainstream ====
Despite the passionate intensity of Muslim feeling on the issue, no Western government banned The Satanic Verses. This is primarily because most Western governments embrace freedom of religion, freedom from religion and freedom of expression, prohibiting on censorship in the vast majority of cases. Western attitudes regarding freedom of expression differ from those in the Arab world because:

- Westerners are less likely to be shocked by ridicule of religious figures. "Taboo and sacrilege are virtually dead in the West. Blasphemy is an old story and can no longer shock". Examples of movies and books that aroused little or no protest in the west despite their blasphemy: Joseph Heller's God Knows, which turned "Biblical stories into pornographic fare"; Even The Protocols of the Elders of Zion, a book that was not only offensive and untrue but arguably very dangerous, having inspired the killing of Jews in Russia and contributed to Nazi ideology, was "freely available in the west".
- The idea widely accepted among writers that provocation in literature is not a right but is a duty, an important calling: "it is perhaps in the nature of modern art to be offensive ... in this century if we are not willing to risk giving offence, we have no claim to the title of artists". Rushdie himself said: "I had spent my entire life as a writer in opposition, and indeed conceived the writer's role as including the function of antagonist to the state".

The last point also explains why one of the few groups to speak out in Muslim countries against Khomeini and for Rushdie's right to publish his book were other writers. Nobel prize winners Wole Soyinka of Nigeria and Naguib Mahfouz of Egypt, both attacked Khomeini, and both received death threats as a result, with Mahfouz later getting stabbed in the neck by a Muslim fundamentalist.

Some Western politicians and writers did criticise Rushdie. Former US president Jimmy Carter, while condemning the threats and fatwa against Rushdie, stated, "we have tended to promote him and his book with little acknowledgment that it is a direct insult to those millions of Moslems whose sacred beliefs have been violated and are suffering in restrained silence the added embarrassment of the Ayatollah's irresponsibility". He also held that Rushdie must have been aware of the response his book would evoke: "The author, a well-versed analyst of Moslem beliefs, must have anticipated a horrified reaction throughout the Islamic world". Carter saw a need to be "sensitive to the concern and anger" of Muslims and thought severing diplomatic relations with Iran would be an "overreaction".

Among authors, Roald Dahl was scathing and called Rushdie's book sensationalist and Rushdie "a dangerous opportunist". John le Carré thought the death sentence to be outrageous, but he also criticised Rushdie's action: "I don't think it is given to any of us to be impertinent to great religions with impunity", although he later expressed regret over his dispute with Rushdie. Rushdie, however, was supported by major bodies in the literary world such as PEN and Association of American Publishers, and prominent figures such as Günter Grass, Martin Amis, Saul Bellow, Nadine Gordimer, and Derek Walcott. Another major supporter of Rushdie, Christopher Hitchens, said that the fatwa persuaded him that Islamic fundamentalism was an urgent menace, and later wrote God Is Not Great, a polemic against religion. The affair however led to greater caution and some degree of self-censorship when dealing with Islamic issues in the literary and other creative arts.

==== Western religious figures ====
Many religious figures in the United States and United Kingdom shared the aversion to blasphemy of pious Muslims (if not as intensely) and did not defend Rushdie like their secular compatriots. The Archbishop of Canterbury, Robert Runcie, demanded that the government expand the Blasphemy Act to cover other religions, including Islam.

Michael Walzer wrote that the response revealed an evolution of the meaning of blasphemy; it moved away from a crime against God and toward something more temporal.

Today we are concerned for our pain and sometimes, for other people's. Blasphemy has become an offence against the faithful – in much the same way as pornography is an offence against the innocent and the virtuous. Given this meaning, blasphemy is an ecumenical crime and so it is not surprising ... that Christians and Jews should join Muslims in calling Salman Rushdie's [book] a blasphemous book.

Some rabbis, such as Immanuel Jakobovits, chief rabbi of the United Hebrew Congregations of the Commonwealth, opposed the book's publication.

== Reception timeline ==
=== 1988 ===
- 26 September 1988: The novel is published in the UK.
- Khushwant Singh, while reviewing the book in Illustrated Weekly, proposed a ban on The Satanic Verses, apprehending the reaction it may evoke among people.
- 5 October 1988: India bans the novel's importation, after Indian parliamentarian and editor of the monthly magazine Muslim India Syed Shahabuddin petitioned the government of Rajiv Gandhi to ban the book. In 1993, Syed Shahabuddin tried unsuccessfully to ban another book (Ram Swarup's Hindu View of Christianity and Islam).
- October 1988: Death threats against Rushdie compel him to cancel trips and sometimes take a bodyguard. Letter writing campaign to Viking Press in America brings "tens of thousands of menacing letters".
- 20 October 1988: Union of Muslim Organisations of the UK writes to the British government pressing for a ban of The Satanic Verse on grounds of blasphemy.
- 21 November 1988: Grand sheik of Egypt Al-Azhar calls on Islamic organisations in Britain to take legal action to prevent the novel's distribution.
- 24 November 1988: The novel is banned in South Africa and Pakistan; bans follow within weeks in Saudi Arabia, Egypt, Somalia, Bangladesh, Sudan, Malaysia, Indonesia, and Qatar.
- 2 December 1988: First book burning of The Satanic Verses in UK. 7000 Muslims attend rally burning the book in Bolton, though the event is barely noticed by the media.

=== 1989 ===
- 14 January 1989: A copy of the book is burned in Bradford by Deobandi and Barelvi activists. Extensive media coverage and debate. Some support from non-Muslims.
- January 1989: Islamic Defense Council demands that Penguin Books apologise, withdraw the novel, destroy any extant copies, and never reprint it.
- February 1989: The first copies of the United States edition appear in bookstores, along with book reviews in the US press.
- 12 February 1989: Six people are killed and 100 injured when 10,000 attack the American Cultural Center in Islamabad, Pakistan, protesting against Rushdie and his book.
- 13 February 1989: One person is killed and over 100 injured in anti-Rushdie riots in Srinagar, Jammu and Kashmir.
- 14 February 1989: Ayatollah Ruhollah Khomeini of Iran issues a fatwa calling on all Muslims to execute all those involved in the publication of the novel; the 15 Khordad Foundation, an Iranian religious foundation or bonyad, offers a reward of $1 million USD or 200 million rials for the murder of Rushdie, $3 million if done by an Iranian.
- 16 February 1989: Armed Islamist groups, such as Islamic Revolutionary Guard Corps and Hezbollah of Lebanon, express their enthusiasm to "carry out the Imam's decree". Rushdie enters the protection programme of the British government. The bounty on his head is raised to $6 million.
- 17 February 1989: Iranian president Ali Khamenei says Rushdie could be pardoned if he apologises.
- 17 February 1989: Book store chains including B. Dalton, Barnes & Noble, Waldenbooks, and Coles Book Stores say that they will no longer sell the book.
- 18 February 1989: Rushdie apologizes as President Khamenei suggested; initially, IRNA (the official Iranian news agency) says Rushdie's statement "is generally seen as sufficient enough to warrant his pardon".
- 19 February 1989: Ayatollah Khomeini issues edict saying no apology or contrition by Rushdie could lift his death sentence.
- 22 February 1989: The novel is published in the US; major bookstore chains Barnes & Noble and Waldenbooks, under threat, remove the novel from one-third of the nation's bookstores.
- 24 February 1989: Twelve people die and 40 are wounded when a large anti-Rushdie riot in Bombay, Maharashtra, India starts to cause considerable property damage and police open fire.
- 28 February 1989: Bookstores, including Cody's and Waldenbooks in Berkeley, California, USA, are firebombed for selling the novel.
- 28 February 1989: 1989 firebombing of the Riverdale Press: The offices of the Riverdale Press, a weekly newspaper in the Bronx, is destroyed by firebombs. A caller to 911 says the bombing was in retaliation for an editorial defending the right to read the novel and criticising the chain stores that stopped selling it.
- 7 March 1989: Iran breaks diplomatic relations with Britain.
- March 1989: Independent book stores including Cody's in Berkeley, California, United States and Powell's in Portland, Oregon, United States continue to sell the book.
- March 1989: The Organisation of the Islamic Conference calls on its 46 member governments to prohibit the novel. The Revolutionary Government of Zanzibar sets the punishment for possession of the book as three years in prison and a fine of $2,500; in Malaysia, three years in prison and a fine of $7,400; in Indonesia, a month in prison or a fine. The only nation with a predominantly Muslim population where the novel remains legal is Turkey. Several nations with large Muslim minorities, including Papua New Guinea, Thailand, Sri Lanka, Kenya, Tanzania, Liberia, and Sierra Leone, also impose penalties for possessing the novel.
- May 1989: Musician Yusuf Islam (formerly known as Cat Stevens) indicates his support for the fatwa and states during a British television documentary, according to The New York Times, that if Rushdie shows up at his door, he "might ring somebody who might do more damage to him than he would like... I'd try to phone the Ayatollah Khomeini and tell him exactly where this man is". Yusuf Islam later denied giving support to the fatwa. For more on this topic see Cat Stevens' comments about Salman Rushdie.
- 27 May 1989: 15,000 to 20,000 Muslims gather in Parliament Square in London burning Rushdie in effigy and calling for the novel's banning.
- 3 June 1989: Khomeini dies. Former president Khamenei takes over as the new Supreme Leader.
- 31 July 1989: The BBC broadcasts Tony Harrison's film-poem The Blasphemers' Banquet in which Harrison defends Rushdie by likening him to Molière, Voltaire, Omar Khayyam and Lord Byron.
- Following the broadcast of his film-poem, Harrison published a poem titled The Satanic Verses in The Observer in which he wrote:

I shall not cease from mental strife
nor shall my pen sleep in my hand
till Rushdie has a right to life
and books aren't burned or banned

- 3 August 1989: A man using the alias Mustafa Mahmoud Mazeh accidentally blew himself up along with two floors of a central London hotel while preparing a bomb intended to kill Rushdie.
- Kerstin Ekman and Lars Gyllensten, members of the Swedish Academy (which awards the Nobel Prize in Literature), stopped participating in the Academy's work in protest at the Academy's refusal to support an appeal to the Swedish cabinet in support for Rushdie. Gyllensten dies in 2006, while Ekman leaves in 2018 after the Academy changed its rules, permitting resignations.

=== 1990 ===
- 1990: Rushdie apologises to Muslims.
- 1990: Rushdie publishes an essay on Khomeini's death, "In Good Faith", to appease his critics and issues an apology in which he seems to reaffirm his respect for Islam; however, Iranian clerics do not retract the fatwa.
- 24 December 1990: Rushdie signs a declaration affirming his Islamic faith and calls for Viking-Penguin, the publisher of The Satanic Verses, neither to issue the book in paperback nor to allow it to be translated.

=== 1991 ===
- 3 July 1991: Ettore Capriolo, the novel's Italian translator, is stabbed and seriously wounded.
- 11 July 1991: Hitoshi Igarashi, the novel's Japanese translator, is stabbed to death.
- 11 December 1991: A summit of the Organization of the Islamic Conference in Dakar, Senegal reaffirms Rushdie as "an apostate" but allows its member states to set their own policies in respect to the appropriate punishment. In a secretive and highly-guarded event, Rushdie makes his first public appearance outside of England at the Columbia University Graduate School of Journalism for an event celebrating the 200th anniversary of the First Amendment to the United States Constitution. He retreats from his compromise attempts with moderate Iranian leaders and calls for the book to be studied to give meaning to his years in hiding and criticizes Iranian human rights abuses.

=== 1993–1994 ===
- 2 July 1993: The Sivas massacre. Thirty-seven Turkish intellectuals and locals participating in the Pir Sultan Abdal Literary Festival die when the conference hotel in Sivas, Turkey, is burnt down by a mob of radical islamists. Participating in the conference was Aziz Nesin, who had previously announced that he was going to get the book translated and published. The mob demanded he be handed over for summary execution. The mob set the hotel alight when Nesin was not turned over. Nesin escaped the fire and survived.
- 11 August 1993: Rushdie makes a rare public appearance at U2's concert in Wembley Stadium on their Zoo TV Tour in London. Bono, clothed as stage character/devil Mr. MacPhisto, placed a call to Rushdie only to find himself face to face with Rushdie on stage. Rushdie told Bono that "real devils don't wear horns".
- 11 October 1993: The novel's Norwegian publisher, William Nygaard, is shot and seriously injured.

=== 1997–1998 ===
- 1997: The bounty is doubled, to $600,000.
- 1998: Iranian government publicly declares that it will "neither support nor hinder assassination operations on Rushdie". This is announced as part of a wider agreement to normalise relations between Iran and the United Kingdom. Rushdie subsequently declares that he will stop living in hiding, and that he is not, in fact, religious. According to some of Iran's leading clerics, despite the death of Khomeini and the Iranian government's official declaration, the fatwa remains in force. Iran's foreign minister Kamal Kharazi stated,

The Government of the Islamic Republic of Iran has no intention, nor is it going to take any action whatsoever, to threaten the life of the author of The Satanic Verses or anybody associated with his work, nor will it encourage or assist anybody to do so".

=== 1999 ===
- 1999: An Iranian foundation places a $2.8 million bounty on Rushdie's life.
- 14 February 1999: On the tenth anniversary of the ruling against Rushdie, more than half of the deputies in the Iranian Parliament sign a statement declaring, "The verdict on Rushdie, the blasphemer, is death, both today and tomorrow, and to burn in hell for all eternity".

=== 2000–2004 ===
- 14 February 2000: Ayatollah Hassan Saneii, the head of the 15th of Khordad Foundation, reiterates that the death sentence remains valid and the foundation's $2.8 million reward will be paid with interest to Rushdie's assassins. Persians take this news with some scepticism as the foundation is "widely known" to be bankrupt.
- January 2002: South Africa lifts its ban on The Satanic Verses.
- 16 February 2003: Iran's Revolutionary Guards reiterate the call for the assassination of Rushdie. As reported by the Sunday Herald, "Ayatollah Hassan Saneii, head of the semi-official Khordad Foundation that has placed a $2.8 million bounty on Rushdie's head, was quoted by the Jomhuri Islami newspaper as saying that his foundation would now pay $3 million to anyone who kills Rushdie".

=== 2005–2007 ===
- Early 2005: Khomeini's fatwa against Rushdie is reaffirmed by Iran's spiritual leader, Ayatollah Ali Khamenei, in a message to Muslim pilgrims making the annual pilgrimage to Mecca. Iran has rejected requests to withdraw the fatwa on the basis that only the person who issued it may withdraw it.
- 14 February 2006: Iran's official state news agency reports on the anniversary of the decree that the government-run Martyrs Foundation has announced, "The fatwā by Imam Khomeini in regard to the apostate Salman Rushdie will be in effect forever", and that one of Iran's state bonyad, or foundations, has offered a $2.8 million bounty on his life.
- 15 June 2007: Rushdie receives knighthood for services to literature, sparking an outcry from Islamic groups. Several groups invoking The Satanic Verses controversy renew calls for his death.
- 29 June 2007: Bombs planted in central London may have been linked to the Knighthood of Salman Rushdie.

=== 2008–2012 ===
- 24 January 2012: The vice-chancellor of Darul Uloom Deoband, an Islamic school in India, issued a demand that Rushdie be denied a visa for his scheduled appearance at the Jaipur Literature Festival at the end of January. The Indian government replied that there were no plans to bar Rushdie from entering the country, and that Rushdie, who had visited India several times in the past, did not need a visa because he held a Persons of Indian Origin Card "that entitles holders to travel to the country of their origin without other documentation". Rushdie ultimately decided not to attend the festival, citing reports of possible assassination attempts. Rushdie investigated police reports of paid assassins and suggested that the police might have lied. Meanwhile, police were seeking Ruchir Joshi, Jeet Thayil, Hari Kunzru, and Amitava Kumar who fled Jaipur on the advice of officials at the Jaipur Literature Festival after reading excerpts from The Satanic Verses, which is banned in India. A proposed video link session between Rushdie and the Jaipur Literature Festival ran into difficulty after the government pressured the festival to stop it.
- 17 September 2012: Rushdie expressed doubt that The Satanic Verses would be published today because of a climate of "fear and nervousness".

=== 2016 ===
- 22 February 2016: A group of forty state-run media organisations in Iran raised $600,000 to add to the Fatwa on Rushdie.
- 24 March: In a press release, the Swedish Academy, who awards the Nobel Prize in Literature, condemns the death sentence for Rushdie for the first time, saying:

"The death sentence and the reward money are flagrant breaches of international law and rules of civilised interaction within the world community and therefore can in no way be compatible with normalisation.

The fact that the death sentence has been passed as punishment for a work of literature also implies a serious violation of free speech. The principle of the independence of literature from political control is of fundamental importance for civilisation and must be defended against attacks by avengers and the adherents of censorship.

The Swedish Academy decries the retention of the death sentence for Salman Rushdie and that state-controlled media are permitted to encourage violence directed at a writer."

=== 2022 ===
- 12 August 2022: Rushdie was stabbed in the neck and abdomen when he was set to give a lecture in Chautauqua, New York. Commenting on the extent of his injuries, Rushdie's agent said that he had likely lost an eye, in addition to sustaining liver damage and severed nerves in one arm. Rushdie was placed on a ventilator the day of the attack, but within 48 hours, he was taken off of it and reportedly able to speak.
- 14 August 2022: Two days after Rushdie's stabbing, the government-run newspaper of Iran called the attack an "implementation of divine decree".

=== 2024 ===
- November 2024: The Delhi High Court quashed the Indian ban on imports of the book after it failed to find any evidence of the original 1988 order.

== See also ==
- Jyllands-Posten Muhammad cartoons controversy
- International Guerillas, 1990 Pakistani action film depicting Salman Rushdie as its main villain
- Mariwan Halabjaee, Iraqi Kurd sometimes compared to Rushdie
- Richard Webster's book A Brief History of Blasphemy, which discusses The Satanic Verses controversy
