= Cat Stevens's comments about Salman Rushdie =

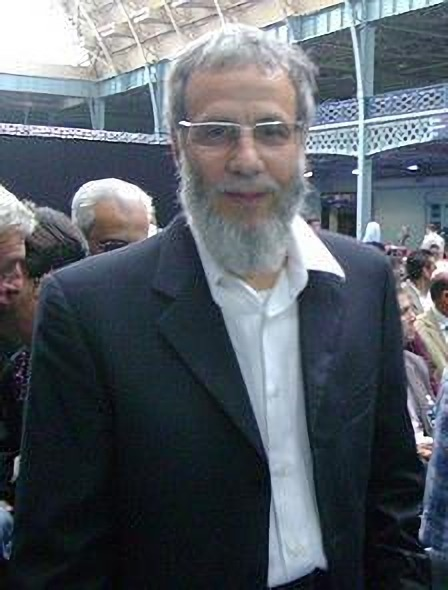
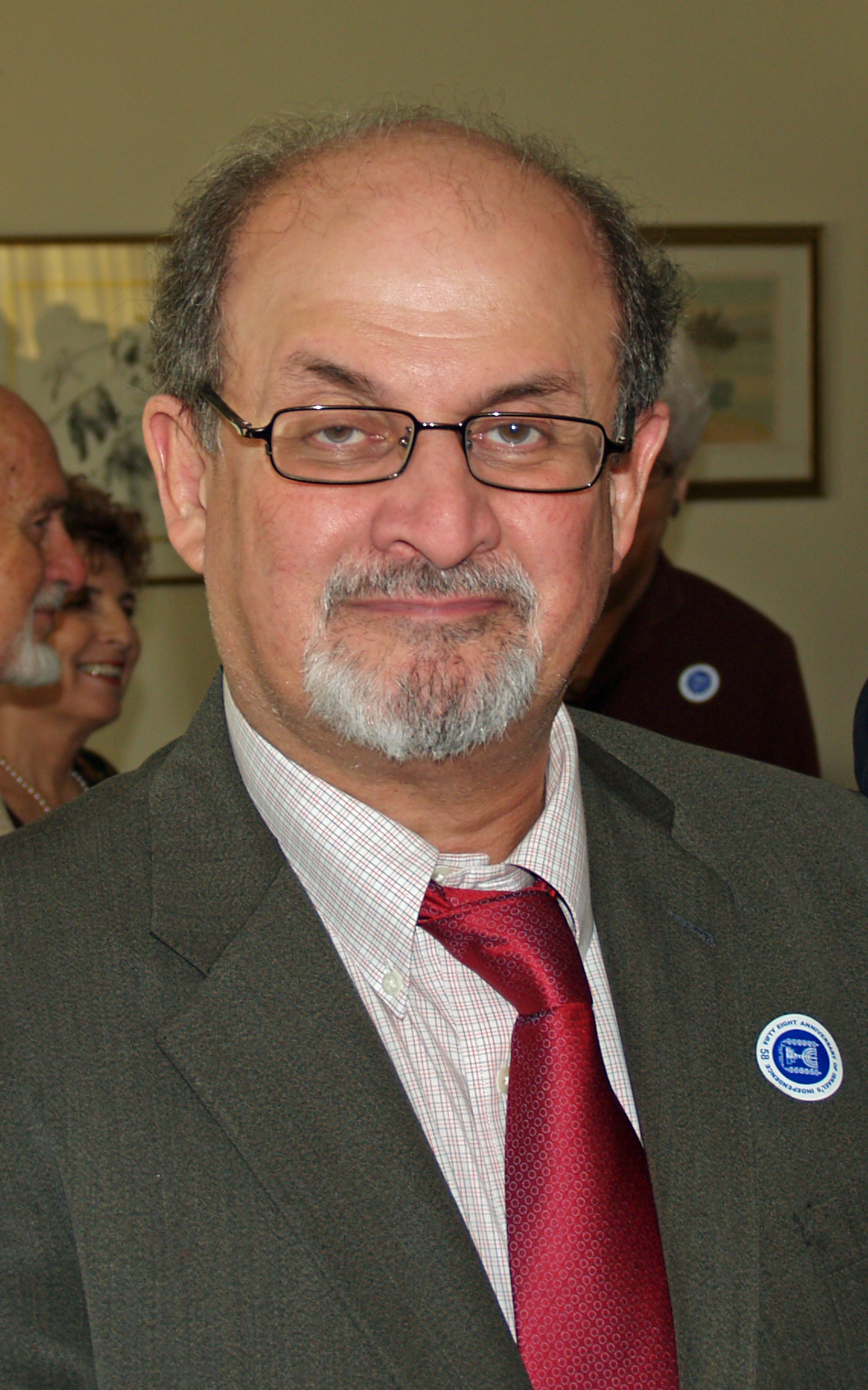
British musician Yusuf Islam (left), British author Salman Rushdie (right)

Following Ayatollah Khomeini's 14 February 1989 death fatwa against author Salman Rushdie, after the publication of Rushdie's novel The Satanic Verses, British musician Yusuf Islam (previously and better known by his stage name Cat Stevens) made statements endorsing the killing of Rushdie, generating sharp criticism from commentators in the West.

In response, Yusuf Islam said that some of his comments were "stupid and offensive jokes" made in "bad taste", while others were merely giving his interpretation of Islamic law but not advocating any action. Islam also said that later in the same programme he promised to accept the judgment of a British court if it found Rushdie innocent of any crime, blasphemy or otherwise.

== Statements ==
=== Kingston Polytechnic ===
On 21 February 1989, Yusuf Islam addressed students at Kingston Polytechnic (now Kingston University) in London about his conversion to Islam and was asked about the controversy in the Muslim world and the fatwa calling for Salman Rushdie's execution. He replied, "The Qur'an makes it clear, if someone defames the prophet, then he must die." He added that "Under Islam, if a man has done someone ill, he must make amends. He must ask his publishers to get back his books, and if necessary he must spend every penny he has to get them all." Additionally, he allegedly asked the students if they believed Rushdie should die, and around one third of them raised their arms in response.

Newspapers quickly denounced what was seen as Yusuf Islam's support for the killing of Rushdie and the next day, he released a statement saying that he was not personally encouraging anybody to be a vigilante, and that he was only stating that blasphemy is a capital offence according to the Qur'an.

=== Hypotheticals ===
Two months later, Islam appeared on an Australian television programme, ABC's Geoffrey Robertson's Hypotheticals, an occasional broadcast featuring a panel of notable guests to explore a hypothetical situation with moral, ethical or political dilemmas. In the episode "A Satanic Scenario", Islam had an exchange about the issue with the moderator and King's Counsel Geoffrey Robertson. Islam would later clarify the exchanges as "stupid and offensive jokes" made "in bad taste", but "part of a well-known British national trait ... dry humour on my part."

Robertson: You don't think that this man deserves to die?
Y. Islam: Who, Salman Rushdie?
Robertson: Yes.
Y. Islam: Yes, yes.
Robertson: And do you have a duty to be his executioner?
Y. Islam: Uh, no, not necessarily, unless we were in an Islamic state and I was ordered by a judge or by the authority to carry out such an act – perhaps, yes.
[Some minutes later, Robertson on the subject of a protest where an effigy of the author is to be burned]
Robertson: Would you be part of that protest, Yusuf Islam, would you go to a demonstration where you knew that an effigy was going to be burned?
Y. Islam: I would have hoped that it'd be the real thing.

The New York Times also reports this statement from the programme: [If Rushdie turned up at my doorstep looking for help] I might ring somebody who might do more damage to him than he would like. I'd try to phone the Ayatollah Khomeini and tell him exactly where this man is.

Later Islam stated the following about his above mentioned comments:

I foolishly made light of certain provocative questions. When asked what I'd do if Salman Rushdie entered a restaurant in which I was eating, I said, "I would probably call up Ayatollah Khomeini"; and, rather than go to a demonstration to burn an effigy of the author, I jokingly said I would have preferred that it'd be the "real thing".

The content of the broadcast was reported in The New York Times on 23 May 1989, a week before the show's intended broadcast. He and other Muslim participants "objected to cuts" that "omitted the Muslim justification for punishment of blasphemy."

According to Islam, his last comments on the innocence of Rushdie were not a joke:

Providentially, they kept in one important response to a final question posed directly to me by Geoffrey Robertson QC. At the end of the debate he asked me to imagine if Salman Rushdie was taken to court in Britain and the jury found him 'not guilty' of any crime – blasphemy or otherwise – and dismissed the case, what I would do. I clearly stated that I would have to accept the decision and fully abide by the law! And that was no joke.

=== Other statements ===
On 8 October 1989, Islam sent a "letter of complaint" to Viking, the publishers of Rushdie's book The Satanic Verses, following excerpts of the book which had been forwarded to him. In the letter, Islam called Rushdie's book "clearly blasphemous in nature" and "deeply offensive to the Muslim community", urging the publishers to give the letter "urgent attention" and to "take a responsible decision".

In 2000, Islam returned to the United States for a speaking tour coinciding with the reissuing of his Cat Stevens music. He also did an interview with Rolling Stone magazine in order to "reconnect" with his fans and explain himself. When asked about the Rushdie affair, he responded:

I'm very sad that this seems to be the No. 1 question people want to discuss. I had nothing to do with the issue other than what the media created. I was innocently drawn into the whole controversy. So, after many years, I'm glad at least now that I have been given the opportunity to explain to the public and fans my side of the story in my own words. At a lecture, back in 1989, I was asked a question about blasphemy according to Islamic Law, I simply repeated the legal view according to my limited knowledge of the Scriptural texts, based directly on historical commentaries of the Qur'an. The next day the newspaper headlines read, "Cat Says, Kill Rushdie." I was abhorred, but what could I do? I was a new Muslim. If you ask a Bible student to quote the legal punishment of a person who commits blasphemy in the Bible, he would be dishonest if he didn't mention Leviticus 24:16.

He also wrote on his website:

I never called for the death of Salman Rushdie; nor backed the Fatwa issued by the Ayatollah Khomeini—and still don’t. The book itself destroyed the harmony between peoples and created an unnecessary international crisis. When asked about my opinion regarding blasphemy, I could not tell a lie and confirmed that – like both the Torah and the Gospel – the Qur'an considers it, without repentance, as a capital offense. The Bible is full of similar harsh laws if you're looking for them. However, the application of such Biblical and Qur'anic injunctions is not to be outside of due process of law, in a place or land where such law is accepted and applied by the society as a whole...

Islam references the incident on his 2014 album Tell 'Em I'm Gone, in a song called "Editing Floor Blues". The specific line reads: "One day the papers rang us up, 'T’check if I said this?', I said 'Oh boy! I'd never say that!' And we got down to the truth of it, but they never printed that!"

During an October 2020 appearance on the BBC's Desert Island Discs, Islam echoed his previous statements, saying he was "not prepared or equipped to deal with shark-toothed journalists", and he was "cleverly framed", with an early press statement by him "completely ignored". He also called a fatwa "an opinion that doesn't come directly from the Qu'ran at all."

==== Reaction to Rushdie's 2022 stabbing ====
Avatar of Yusuf / Cat Stevens

Yusuf / Cat Stevens
(@YusufCatStevens)
tweeted:

Saddened and shocked to learn about the horrific act on @SalmanRushdie my wish is for us all to live in peace. May God grant him and every one else who has suffered from the manic pandemic of violence in this world, a full recovery. Peace

August 12, 2022

In August 2022, Rushdie was stabbed multiple times and suffered serious injury during a public appearance. In response, Islam released a statement on his social media accounts condemning the attack and wishing Rushdie a full recovery.

== Criticism and backlash ==
Islam's comments caused a backlash at the time. The pop group 10,000 Maniacs deleted the Cat Stevens song "Peace Train", which they had recorded for their 1987 In My Tribe album, from subsequent pressings of the album as a protest against Islam's remarks. Several US stations stopped playing Cat Stevens records. Radio talk show host Tom Leykis of KFI-AM in Los Angeles called for a mass burning of Cat Stevens' records, later changed to a mass steamrolling. Islam claimed that he had earlier unsuccessfully asked his record company to stop production of his Cat Stevens records but they had refused on economic grounds.

Commenting on the controversy regarding the United States government's 2004 refusal to allow Islam to enter the country, Middle East scholar Juan Cole criticised him, saying that he "never forgave him [Stevens] for advocating the execution of Salman Rushdie", and claiming he had "later explained this position away by saying that he did not endorse vigilante action against Rushdie, but would rather want the verdict to be carried out by a proper court."

After Islam's 2010 appearance at Jon Stewart and Stephen Colbert's Rally to Restore Sanity and/or Fear in Washington, D.C., Stewart received a phone call from Rushdie, who expressed disappointment that a performer was used "who wanted to kill me." Stewart said he was unaware of Islam's 1989 comments at the time. "So I'm like, I'm sure he doesn't believe that people should be put to death for apostasy," Stewart recalled during a 2012 fundraiser. "I said, 'look, I'm sorry you're upset, but I'm sure the guy isn't really like that. Let me talk to him.'" Islam said the whole thing was a "misunderstanding", but added "although why do you have to insult the Prophet?" Stewart continued "We get into a whole conversation, and it becomes very clear to me that he is straddling two worlds in a very difficult way, and it broke my heart a little bit. I wish I had known that, I wouldn't have done [the routine], I don't think, because that to me is a deal breaker. Death for free speech is a deal breaker." In the 23 April 2014, episode of The Daily Show, Stewart stated unequivocally that inviting Islam was a "mistake" and that he "should have looked into it more."

=== Rushdie's response ===
Rushdie himself, in a 2007 letter to the editor of The Daily Telegraph, complained of what he believed was Islam's attempts to "rewrite his past", and called his claims of innocence "rubbish."

In November 2010, in an interview on George Stroumboulopoulos Tonight on CBC Television Rushdie was asked about Islam's appearance at the Rally to Restore Sanity and/or Fear the previous month. He said, "I thought it was a mistake to have invited him and I actually called up Jon Stewart and we had a couple of conversations and I think, you know, by the end of it I think he's pretty clear that it was probably a misstep. Because he's not a good guy. It may be that he once sang 'Peace Train'... but he hasn't been Cat Stevens for a long time, you know. He's a different guy now."

== Alleged resemblance to character in the novel ==
Some commentators have concluded that the character "Bilal X" in Rushdie's book is a caricature of Yusuf Islam. The fictional character Bilal X, a successful African-American former pop singer who has converted to Islam, is portrayed by Rushdie as the "favoured lieutenant" of "the Imam", a character based on the Shia Ayatollah Ruhollah Khomeini. Bilal X's "well-nourished, highly trained" voice serves as "a weapon of the West turned against its makers".

== See also ==
- The Satanic Verses controversy
