= The Pursuit of the Millennium =

1957 book by Norman Cohn

The Pursuit of the Millennium: Revolutionary Millenarians and Mystical Anarchists of the Middle Ages (1957, revised and expanded in 1970) is Norman Cohn's study of millenarian cult movements.

Covering a wide span of time, Cohn's book discusses topics such as anti-Semitism and the Crusades, in addition to such sects as the Brethren of the Free Spirit, flagellants, the Anabaptists, and the Ranters. The Pursuit of the Millennium concludes with a discussion of the theocratic king John of Leiden, who took over the city of Münster in 1534.

== Legacy ==
People influenced by The Pursuit of the Millennium include the French Marxist philosopher and writer Guy Debord, who considered the chiliastic cults discussed by Cohn something of a model for the Situationist International, and British author Richard Webster. Webster wrote that he was impressed by the book, and that it led him to read Cohn's other works, including Warrant for Genocide and Europe's Inner Demons. Reading those books helped convince Webster that "the principal reason why we should study the witch-hunts of the past is to enable us the better to recognise and oppose the witch-hunts of the present and the future", and led to his interest in the problem of false abuse allegations. John Gray cites Cohn in Black Mass: Apocalyptic Religion and the Death of Utopia. Richard Cavendish (occult writer) also cites Cohn in The Powers of Evil in Western Religion and Folk Belief.

== See also ==
- A Brief History of Blasphemy
- Christian anarchism
