= Richard Webster (British author) =

British author and historian (1950–2011)

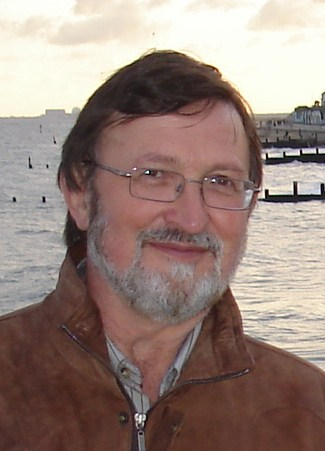
- Webster in 2009
- Born: 17 December 1950; Newington, Kent, United Kingdom
- Died: 24 June 2011 (aged 60)
- Education: University of East Anglia
- Occupation: Author
- Writing career
- Subjects: Blasphemy, free speech, Sigmund Freud, abuse allegations
- Notable works: A Brief History of Blasphemy, Why Freud Was Wrong, The Secret of Bryn Estyn

Richard Webster (17 December 1950 – 24 June 2011) was a British author. His five published books deal with subjects such as the controversy over Salman Rushdie's novel The Satanic Verses (1988), Sigmund Freud and psychoanalysis, and moral panics regarding child sexual abuse in Britain. Born in Newington, Kent, Webster studied English literature at the University of East Anglia and lived in Oxford, England.

In A Brief History of Blasphemy (1990), Webster discussed the Muslim response to The Satanic Verses and argues against unrestricted freedom of speech. The book was praised by Rowan Williams, the Archbishop of Canterbury. In Webster's subsequent book Why Freud Was Wrong (1995), he argued that Freud became a Messiah figure and that psychoanalysis is a disguised continuation of the Judaeo-Christian tradition. The book was praised by several commentators. In The Secret of Bryn Estyn: The Making of a Modern Witch Hunt (2005), Webster discussed a care home for adolescent boys that became the focus of press revelations and a police investigation for child abuse that spread across a number of residential homes in North Wales, and argued that abuse scandals could be phenomena created by public hysteria. He became interested in the problem of false allegations partly due to reading the work of historian Norman Cohn. This final book was shortlisted for the Orwell Prize.

== Personal life and career ==
Webster, the son of a subpostmaster, was born in 1950 in Newington, Thanet, in Kent, and raised in a strict Methodist family; according to journalist Bob Woffinden, "His parents' work ethic meant he had much time to himself, leading to independence of thought and intellectual rebellion." He attended Sir Roger Manwood's School in Sandwich, Kent and graduated in English and American studies from the University of East Anglia. Webster returned to the university to teach in 1974 and 1975 and started a PhD, which he did not complete. When his father became ill, Webster ran the family post office, which had been shifted to Cambridge.

Having married in 1977, Webster started The Orwell Bookshop in Southwold with his wife Bod in 1985. The shop was successful, but was sold because Webster's other interests demanded too much of his time. Webster moved to Oxford after the break-up of his marriage.

In his A Brief History of Blasphemy (1990), Webster described himself as "an atheist who was brought up as a Methodist." This work led Margareta Petersson to describe him as being one of the few Western writers who have "tried to view the Rushdie affair from a Muslim perspective", viewing the controversy over The Satanic Verses not as a single case of confrontation between Islam and the West, but the most recent of a series of hostile encounters, which started as soon as Muhammad's movement had grown strong. Webster once wrote: "at the heart of almost everything I have written over the last twenty years or so is the view that, in our modern, proudly rationalist attempts to break the links which tie us to our superstitious, essentially religious past, we have become profoundly muddled about our own cultural history." He noted that his investigations into police 'trawling operations', which occupied him for many years, were not a diversion from his theory of cultural history but an attempt to apply it in practice.

Webster made the acquaintance of literary critic Frederick Crews while the latter was working on the essays that appeared in The Memory Wars (1995); Crews thanked Webster for his help, and commented that his contact with him had been enriching. Webster's Why Freud Was Wrong (1995) received acclaim, as well as some criticism.

With Bob Woffinden, Webster helped find lawyers for Dawn Reed and Christopher Lillie, former Newcastle nurses who were falsely accused of sexually abusing children in their care. Reed and Lillie, who were first accused of child abuse in 1993 and only found not guilty in 2002, say that they would probably be dead, through suicide or murder, without this assistance. Reed told The Observer that, "After all that had happened, to find people who wanted to help us just out of the goodness of their hearts was amazing".

Webster explained his interest in the problem of false allegations in his The Secret of Bryn Estyn (2005):

... when I was an undergraduate reading English literature at the University of East Anglia, I stumbled upon a book by the historian Norman Cohn, The Pursuit of the Millennium ... The extraordinary range and power of Cohn's book led me to read his other work – his book about conspiracy theories and modern anti-semitism, Warrant for Genocide, and, when it appeared in 1975, Europe's Inner Demons, his study of the great European witch-hunt of the sixteenth and seventeenth centuries. All three books seek to establish the role played in history by collective fantasies and all three are concerned with "the urge to purify the world through the annihilation of some category of human beings imagined as agents of corruption and incarnations of evil." ... The Paladin paperback edition of Europe's Inner Demons, which appeared in 1976, bore on its cover these words of Anthony Storr: "This is a book of real stature which I hope will have wide impact. Only if we begin to understand the horrifying recesses of the human imagination can we prevent the recurrence of those dreadful, irrational persecutions which have so disfigured human history." Without my fully realising it at the time, those words influenced me deeply and I have since taken it for granted that the principal reason why we should study the witch-hunts of the past is to enable us the better to recognise and oppose the witch-hunts of the present and the future.

In 2005, Wrexham council decided, following legal advice, to refuse permission for Falsely Accused Carers and Teachers (FACT) North Wales, a support group for carers and teachers, to hold its conference 'False Allegations – Truthful Answers' at the Erlas Centre, one of its venues, after it learned the purpose of the event. Webster, who was to have been a key speaker at the conference, had been going to discuss The Secret of Bryn Estyn. Wrexham councillor Malcolm King was quoted as saying that he was "very pleased" that the council had prevented something that "would have been very hurtful to many people who have already been hurt enough". Webster stated in reply that he was "flabbergasted" by the council's action, and that King "entirely missed the point", since, in Webster's opinion, the evidence showed that there never was a paedophile ring based at Bryn Estyn and that dozens of staff had been wrongly accused.

Webster died of natural causes in 2011; he had undergone heart surgery a decade before his death. Julie Summers, who knew Webster through the Writers in Oxford group, said of him: "What was so special about him was he had this very gentle, but very, very clear view on things. You could always rely on him to cut through the mud and see exactly the point of an issue. He had a very clear mind." Webster had spent much of the year assisting Portuguese contacts to expose the Casa Pia child sexual abuse scandal as, in Webster's opinion, a scare. A book was subsequently published, Casa Pia: Portugal's high society paedophile ring. Fact or fantasy?. Webster also left behind an unfinished book, The Natural History of Human Beings.

== Private press ==
Webster owned and controlled his own press, The Orwell Press.

It was founded in 1988 by Webster and was primarily involved in publishing images of the Suffolk Heritage Coast, painted by Stanley Spencer, Philip Wilson Steer and J. M. W. Turner.

Webster also used the press to self-publish his own writing.

In 2011, the Orwell Press became Orwell Press Art Publishing. "Since that time our range of cards has grown from 50 images to over 200, and now include some of the best art of our favourite places in Great Britain."

== Works ==
=== A Brief History of Blasphemy ===
In A Brief History of Blasphemy: Liberalism, Censorship and the Satanic Verses (1990), Webster discusses the controversy over Salman Rushdie's novel The Satanic Verses. The book was widely praised in the immediate aftermath of the controversy. While condemning the Ayatollah Khomeini's threats against Rushdie, Webster also tried to explain the hurt The Satanic Verses caused Muslims and argued that we should not arbitrarily defend the liberty to publish books that may cause distress to minorities or increase racial tension. Webster noted that he named the book after the fourth section of The Crime of Blasphemy, a pamphlet issued by the International Committee for the Defence of Salman Rushdie and his Publishers, and that his work is influenced by historians Karen Armstrong and Norman Cohn. He also approvingly cites Muslim writer Shabbir Akhtar. He described his book as "an attempt to show, without ever aspiring to completeness or comprehensiveness, that the picture of blasphemy which is presented by the authors of International Committee's document is incomplete, and in some respects, seriously misleading." The work was praised by Rowan Williams, the Archbishop of Canterbury.

=== Why Freud Was Wrong ===
Why Freud Was Wrong: Sin, Science and Psychoanalysis (1995), the book for which Webster may be best remembered, is a critique of Sigmund Freud and psychoanalysis. In it, Webster argues that Freud became a kind of Messiah and that psychoanalysis is a disguised continuation of the Judaeo-Christian tradition. The work received acclaim. It was called "brilliant" by Anthony Storr and Jonathan Gathorne-Hardy. It was identified as "an indispensable modern critique of psychoanalysis" by Storr and "the most comprehensive negative critique" of Freud by professor of German language and literature Ritchie Robertson (who notes that it incorporates earlier critiques). Peter J. Swales gave it a mixed review. Webster has been credited with exposing the weakness of Freud's science and exposing his disguised continuation of the Judaeo-Christian tradition more comprehensively than any previous author.

=== The Great Children's Home Panic ===
In The Great Children's Home Panic (1998), Webster discusses police investigation of sexual abuse in Britain. Christian Wolmar writes that in Webster's view "there is a grave risk of injustice against care workers because there are financial incentives" to make false claims and police have encouraged alleged victims to come forward by suggesting that they may obtain damages. Wolmar states that while the police initially referred people to lawyers, they are now reluctant to do this, as it has enabled defence lawyers to undermine the credibility of witnesses, and that many of those who make successful claims through the Criminal Injuries Compensation Authority (CICA) lose much of the award. According to him, while Webster sees claims to CICA as vulnerable to abuse because of its low standards of proof, lawyers acting on behalf of victims observe that even making claims to CICA is painful. He cites solicitor Bilhar Singh Uppal as arguing that while Webster is right to open debate, there has been no wholesale fabrication of evidence.

Damian Thompson writes that in Webster's view "investigations into child abuse in care homes in the early 1990s were disfigured by the zealotry associated with the Ritual Satanic Abuse affair".

Chris Beckett writes that while Webster accepts that abuse occurs, he considers many convictions against former residential workers were miscarriages of justice and sees them as similar to witch-hunts. Beckett sees Webster's case against the widespread belief that the residential care system was infiltrated by paedophile rings as well-argued. According to Beckett, Webster argues that police procedures in North Wales dangerously reverse normal police methods, by starting with suspects and then interviewing large numbers of people to find out whether a crime was committed; this process is flawed since former residents of residential homes may have motives to make false accusations.

=== Freud ===
Freud (2003) is a short critical discussion of Freud written for The Great Philosophers series edited by Ray Monk and Frederic Raphael. Steven Poole calls Freud "an entertaining demolition job", noting that it discusses Anna O.'s hysteria, Freud's seduction theory, reconstructed memories, the Oedipus complex, and the influence of Wilhelm Fliess.

=== The Secret of Bryn Estyn ===
In The Secret of Bryn Estyn: The Making of a Modern Witch Hunt (2005), Webster discusses the case of Bryn Estyn, a care home for adolescent boys which, in the 1990s, became the focus of press revelations and a police investigation for child abuse that spread across a number of residential homes in North Wales. The work, in which Webster argued that abuse scandals could be phenomena created by public hysteria, received praise from British journalists. Peter Wilby calls The Secret of Bryn Estyn "exhaustively researched", noting that while it was shortlisted for the Orwell Prize, it went largely unnoticed by the British press. Wilby writes that Webster compares modern scandals of mass abuse to the witch-hunts of the Middle Ages. Journalist Catherine Bennett credits Webster with exposing "the hysteria and false accusations generated by the Bryn Estyn children's home investigations", and writes that in his view the uncritical press reports about the issue demonstrate "the insatiable human appetite for narratives of evil".

The rights to the book were bought by Tony Garnett, a producer of television dramas. Garnett planned a three-hour drama based on The Secret of Bryn Estyn for Britain's Channel 4, but the project was cancelled due to budget cuts.

=== Articles ===
Webster published articles in Critical Quarterly, Quarto, The Literary Review, The Observer, The Bookseller, The Guardian, The Times Literary Supplement, the New Statesman, and The Tablet. In The Observer in February 1981 Webster attacked structuralists for their "habit of reducing human nature to pseudo-mathematical formulae." "Structuralism and dry rot", Webster's article, was cited by Geoffrey Hartman as an example of how literary theory has become the focus of public debate in England.

Webster published an article suggesting that former British Prime Minister Tony Blair offered a generous tribute to the deceased scientist David Kelly because he was worried that Kelly's widow might accuse him of being responsible for her husband's death, thereby endangering his political career.

== Publications ==
- A Brief History of Blasphemy: Liberalism, Censorship and 'The Satanic Verses, The Orwell Press, 1990. ISBN 0-9515922-0-3
- Why Freud Was Wrong: Sin, Science and Psychoanalysis, Fontana Press, 1996. ISBN 0-00-638428-5
- The Great Children's Home Panic, The Orwell Press, 1998. ISBN 0-9515922-2-X
- Freud, Weidenfeld & Nicolson, 2003. ISBN 0-297-82985-8
- The Secret of Bryn Estyn, The Orwell Press, 2005. ISBN 0-9515922-4-6
- Casa Pia: Portugal's high society paedophile ring. Fact or fantasy?, The Orwell Press, 2011. ISBN 0-9515922-8-9

== See also ==
- Frank Beck (sex offender)
- Liam Hudson
