= Europe's Inner Demons =

1975 book by Norman Cohn

Europe's Inner Demons: An Enquiry Inspired by the Great Witch-Hunt
- The first edition of Europe's Inner Demons, featuring an illustration from a 15th century French manuscript depicting Waldensians worshiping the Devil in the form of a he-goat.
- Author: Norman Cohn
- Language: English
- Subject: European witchcraft
- Publisher: Sussex University Press in association with Heinemann Educational Books
- Publication date: 1975
- Publication place: United Kingdom
- Media type: Print (Hardcover & Paperback)
- Pages: 302
- ISBN: 0-435-82183-0

Europe's Inner Demons: An Enquiry Inspired by the Great Witch-Hunt is a historical study of the beliefs regarding European witchcraft in Late Medieval and Early Modern Europe, with particular reference to the development of the witches' sabbat and its influence on the witch trials in the Early Modern period. It was written by the English historian Norman Cohn, then of the University of Sussex, and first published by Sussex University Press in association with Heinemann Educational Books in 1975. It was released as a part of a series of academic books entitled 'Studies in the Dynamics of Persecution and Extermination' that were funded by the Columbus Centre and edited by Cohn himself.

Within the book, Cohn argues that there never were any Devil-worshipping witches in Early Modern Europe, and that all of those persecuted for being so were innocent. In this he specifically rejects the Witch-cult hypothesis put forward by English scholar Margaret Murray, which argued that there really had been a witch-cult religion which had been pre-Christian in origin. Cohn notes that accusations of worshiping a beast-headed deity, eating children and committing incest were not new to the witches of Late Medieval and Early Modern Europe, but had originally been leveled at Jews in the first century and then at Christians in the second, before being reused against Christian heretical sects like the Waldensians and the Knights Templar during the Late Medieval.

Europe's Inner Demons has come to be recognised as one of the most influential historical studies of European witchcraft beliefs. It has come under criticism for its rejection of Margaret Murray's hypothesis by proponents of that theory within the Contemporary Pagan movement.

== Background ==
In 1966, the University of Sussex in Southern England set up a research centre to investigate the contexts under which the persecution and extermination of different groups of people came about. Based on the proposal of David Astor, it was initially titled the Centre for Research in Collective Psychopathology, but was later renamed the Columbus Centre, after the Columbus Trust which financed it. Multidisciplinary in nature, the Centre went on to publish a series of books on various different persecutions throughout history, from the rise of European nationalism to the Holocaust and apartheid in South Africa. Cohn's study of the Early Modern persecutions of individuals accused of being witches fitted into this series of publications.

In 1957, Cohn had published a book entitled The Pursuit of the Millennium: Revolutionary Millenarians and Mystical Anarchists of the Middle Ages, which saw a revised and expanded edition in 1970. Cohn would note that there was "a certain relationship" between The Pursuit of the Millennium and Europe's Inner Demons, with the two being "complementary to one another."

"This book began as an enquiry into the origins of the great European witch-hunt. It ended as something wider. It argues that the stereotype of the witch, as it existed in many parts of Europe in the fifteenth, sixteenth and seventeenth centuries, is made up of elements of diverse origins, and that some of these derived from a specific fantasy which can be traced back to Antiquity."

— Norman Cohn, 1975.

== Reception ==
The American anthropologist William Arens decided to end his book, The Man-Eating Myth (1979), with a quote taken from Europe's Inner Demons. A critique of claims regarding the existence of socially-sanctioned cultural cannibalism, Arens used the work to draw comparisons between the Early Modern claims of demonic cannibalism with the anthropological community's attitude to cannibalism in "primitive" cultures around the world, highlighting that both are based on scant evidence.

== See also ==
- A Brief History of Blasphemy
