= Liam Hudson =

British psychologist and author (1933–2005)

Liam Hudson (1933–2005) was a British social psychologist and author. Richard Webster writes that Hudson's work provides the best introduction to "the general question of the psychological correlates of intellectual specialisation", and praises his Contrary Imaginations and Frames of Mind as "rich storehouses of evidence, insight and careful inference."

== Books ==
- Contrary Imaginations: A Psychological Study of the English Schoolboy (1967)
- Frames of Mind: Ability, Perception and Self-Perception in the Arts and the Sciences (1968)
- The Ecology of Human Intelligence (1970, as editor)
- The Cult of the Fact (1972)

== See also ==
- Life Against Death

== Sources ==
- www.timesonline.co.uk
