= 1989 firebombing of the Riverdale Press =

Attack on a newspaper office

Coordinates: 40.89499°N 73.89666°W

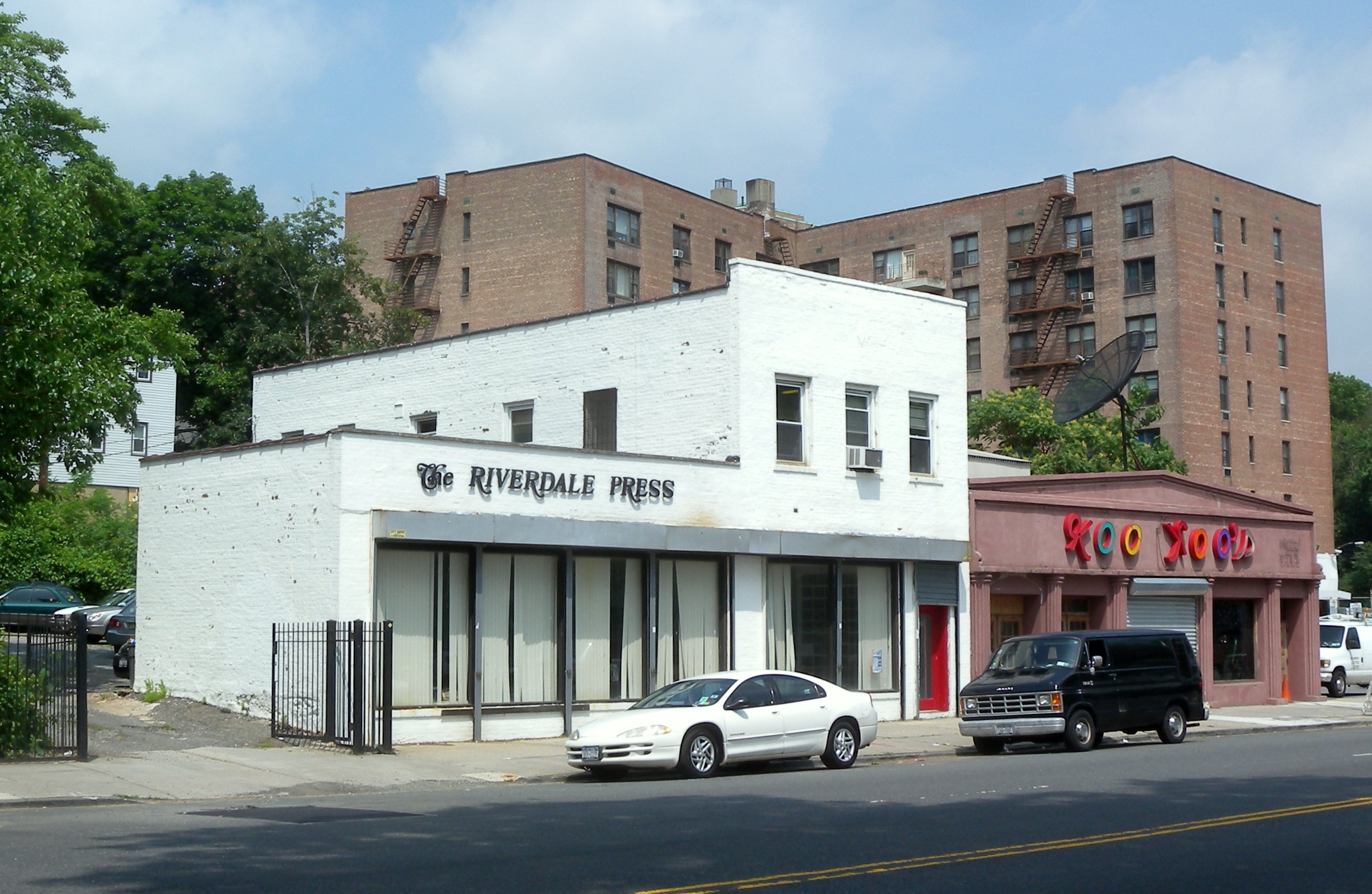
Riverdale Press building on Broadway.

The 1989 firebombing of the Riverdale Press was an attack in which two firebombs were thrown at the offices of a weekly newspaper, the Riverdale Press, in the Riverdale community of the Bronx, New York City on February 28, 1989. The building was heavily damaged. Two California bookstores were also damaged in similar attacks.

The bombing took place shortly after the newspaper published an editorial defending Salman Rushdie during the controversy over The Satanic Verses.

== See also ==
- The Satanic Verses controversy
