= Black Mass: Apocalyptic Religion and the Death of Utopia =

2007 book by John N. Gray

- Author: Gray, John N.
- Language: English
- Subject: Religion
- Publisher: Farrar, Straus and Giroux
- Publication date: October 16, 2007
- Publication place: United Kingdom
- Media type: Hardcover
- Pages: 256
- ISBN: 978-0-374-10598-3
- Dewey Decimal: 321/.07 22
- LC Class: BL65.P7 G69 2007

Black Mass: Apocalyptic Religion and the Death of Utopia is a non-fiction book by John N. Gray published in 2007. Gray was at the time the School Professor of European Thought at the London School of Economics and in the book he further develops his critique of social progress. In recent history, he looks at the New Right government of Margaret Thatcher and the neoconservative government of George W. Bush. He also connects totalitarianism, that is communism and Nazism, with millenarianist movements in the Middle Ages, citing examples such as that of John of Leiden, who led a rebellion in the German city of Münster in 1534. In here he is helped by the work of Norman Cohn, The Pursuit of the Millennium. His main thesis is that the influence of said religious movements created the secular, Enlightenment belief in social progress. This philosophy of history, known as teleology, has contaminated the contemporary isms, including classical liberalism.

The book is split into six chapters, each of which is around 40 pages and is in turn split into sub-chapters:

1. The Death of Utopia
2. Enlightenment and Terror in the Twentieth Century
3. Utopia Enters the Mainstream
4. The Americanization of the Apocalypse
5. Armed Missionaries
6. Post-Apocalypse
