= Hitoshi Igarashi =

Japanese writer and translator (1947–1991)

- Born: 10 June 1947
- Died: 11 July 1991 (aged 44); Tsukuba, Ibaraki, Japan
- Spouse: Masako Igarashi
- Writing career
- Notable work: Translation of The Satanic Verses

Hitoshi Igarashi (五十嵐 一, Igarashi Hitoshi; 10 June 1947 – 11 July 1991) was a Japanese scholar of Arabic and Persian literature and history and the Japanese translator of Salman Rushdie's novel The Satanic Verses. He was murdered in the wake of fatwas issued by Ayatollah Ruhollah Khomeini of Iran – who, by the time of Igarashi's murder, had died – calling for the death of the book's author and "those involved in its publication." His murder remains unsolved.

== Early life ==
Igarashi was born in 1947. He completed his doctoral programme in Islamic art at the University of Tokyo in 1976 and was a research fellow at the Royal Academy of Iran until 1979.

== Career ==
Igarashi was an associate professor of comparative Islamic culture at the University of Tsukuba. He translated Avicenna's The Canon of Medicine and Salman Rushdie's The Satanic Verses and wrote books on Islam, including The Islamic Renaissance and Medicine and Wisdom of the East.

== Death ==
In early 1989, Supreme Leader of Iran Ruhollah Khomeini issued a fatwa, calling for the death of "the author of the Satanic Verses book, which is against Islam, the Prophet and the Qur'an". In March 1991, Khomeini's successor, Ali Khamenei, issued a further fatwa and multimillion-dollar bounty for the death of "any of those involved in its publication who are aware of its content". In 1990, one year after the issuing of these fatwas, Igarashi and his publisher Gianni Palma held a press conference in Tokyo to announce their translation of The Satanic Verses into Japanese. Shi'a Muslims attended the event in order to protest the publication, and midway through, a Pakistani Muslim rushed onto the stage and attempted to assault Palma. The attacker was arrested and deported.

A year and a half later, Igarashi was stabbed repeatedly in the face and arms by an unknown assailant and died. His body was found on 12 July 1991 in his office at the University of Tsukuba. The autopsy showed that he had died within a four-hour timeframe, specifically between 10:00 p.m. on 11 July and 2:00 a.m. on 12 July.

In 2006, the statute of limitations on the stabbing expired. Kenneth M. Pollack alleged in The Persian Puzzle that the attack was a covert operation by the Iranian Revolutionary Guards.

== See also ==
- List of unsolved murders
