= Tim Radford =

British–New Zealand freelance journalist (1940–2025)

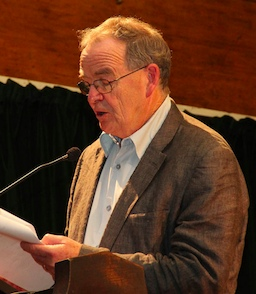
- Radford in 2012
- Born: Timothy Robin Radford; 9 October 1940; Rawene, New Zealand
- Died: 10 February 2025 (aged 84)
- Education: Sacred Heart College, Auckland
- Occupations: Journalist and writer
- Notable credit(s): Science editor at The Guardian, 1980–2005
- Spouse: Maureen Coveney (m. 1964; died 2024)
- Children: 2

Timothy Robin Radford (9 October 1940 – 10 February 2025) was a British journalist who was the science editor for The Guardian newspaper from 1980 to 2005.

== Early life ==
Timothy Robin Radford was born in Rawene, New Zealand, on 9 October 1940, and grew up in Devonport, near Auckland. He was educated at Sacred Heart College, Auckland. At 16, he joined The New Zealand Herald as a reporter. He moved to the United Kingdom in 1961, where he worked for Fishing News, followed by jobs on local newspapers. He then had a stint as a civil servant, working at first as a Whitehall information officer, and subsequently working in journalism, notably for The Guardian newspaper, as well as being a contributor to other publications including The Lancet, New Scientist and The London Review of Books.

== Career ==
Radford worked for The Guardian for 32 years. Over the course of his career, he was letters editor, arts editor, literary editor, and science editor — holding the last post from 1980 until 2005. Radford became increasingly interested in climate change and wrote his first book The Crisis of Life on Earth in 1990. He also served on the UK committee for the International Decade for Natural Disaster Reduction.

In 2011 he co-founded the Climate News Network website.

== Personal life and death ==
In 1964, Radford married Maureen Coveney. They had two children, William and Stella, and were married until Maureen's death in 2024.

Radford died on 10 February 2025, in Eastbourne, UK at the age of 84.

== Awards ==
Radford won four Association of British Science Writers awards:

- Lifetime achievement award for services to science journalism, 2004
- Best feature on science subject in a national or regional newspaper, 2004, for Touching the Void, published in The Guardian on 22 July 2004
- Best communication of science in a non-science context, 2001, for Tell us, Solly, published in the London Review of Books on 20 September 2001
- Other awards in 1992 and 1997

== Bibliography ==
- The Consolations of Physics: Why the Wonders of the Universe can make you Happy (2018), 192 pages, Sceptre (August 2018), Paperback ISBN 978-1473658165
- The Address Book: Our Place in the Scheme of Things (2009), 224 pages, Fourth Estate (April 2011), Paperback ISBN 978-0007356294; Hardback ISBN 978-0007255207
- The Crisis of Life on Earth: Our Legacy from the Second Millennium (1990), 224 pages, Thorsons (October 1990), Hardback ISBN 978-0722521397
