= The Satanic Verses =

1988 novel by Salman Rushdie

- Cover of the first edition, showing a detail from Rustam Killing the White Demon from the Large Clive Album in the Victoria and Albert Museum
- Author: Salman Rushdie
- Language: English
- Genre: Magic realism; theological fiction
- Published: 26 September 1988
- Publisher: Viking Penguin
- Publication place: United Kingdom
- Media type: Print (hardcover and paperback)
- Pages: 546 (first edition)
- ISBN: 0-670-82537-9
- Dewey Decimal: 823/.914
- LC Class: PR6068.U757 S27 1988

The Satanic Verses is the fourth novel by British–Indian writer Salman Rushdie. First published in September 1988, the book was inspired by the life of the Islamic prophet Muhammad. As with his previous books, Rushdie used magical realism and relied on contemporary events and people to create his characters. The title refers to the Satanic Verses, a group of Quranic verses about three pagan Meccan goddesses: Allāt, Al-Uzza, and Manāt. The part of the story that deals with the satanic verses was based on accounts from the historians al-Waqidi and al-Tabari.

The book was a 1988 Booker Prize finalist (losing to Peter Carey's Oscar and Lucinda), and won the 1988 Whitbread Award for novel of the year. Timothy Brennan called the work "the most ambitious novel yet published to deal with the immigrant experience in Britain".

The book and its perceived blasphemy motivated Islamic extremist bombings, killings, and riots and sparked a debate about censorship and religiously motivated violence. Fearing unrest, the Rajiv Gandhi government banned the importation of the book into India. In 1989, Supreme Leader of Iran Ruhollah Khomeini declared a fatwa against Rushdie, resulting in several failed assassination attempts on the author, who was granted police protection by the UK government, and attacks on connected individuals, including the Japanese translator Hitoshi Igarashi who was stabbed to death in 1991. Assassination attempts against Rushdie continued, including an attempt on his life in August 2022, in which he lost sight in one eye and the use of one hand.

== Plot ==
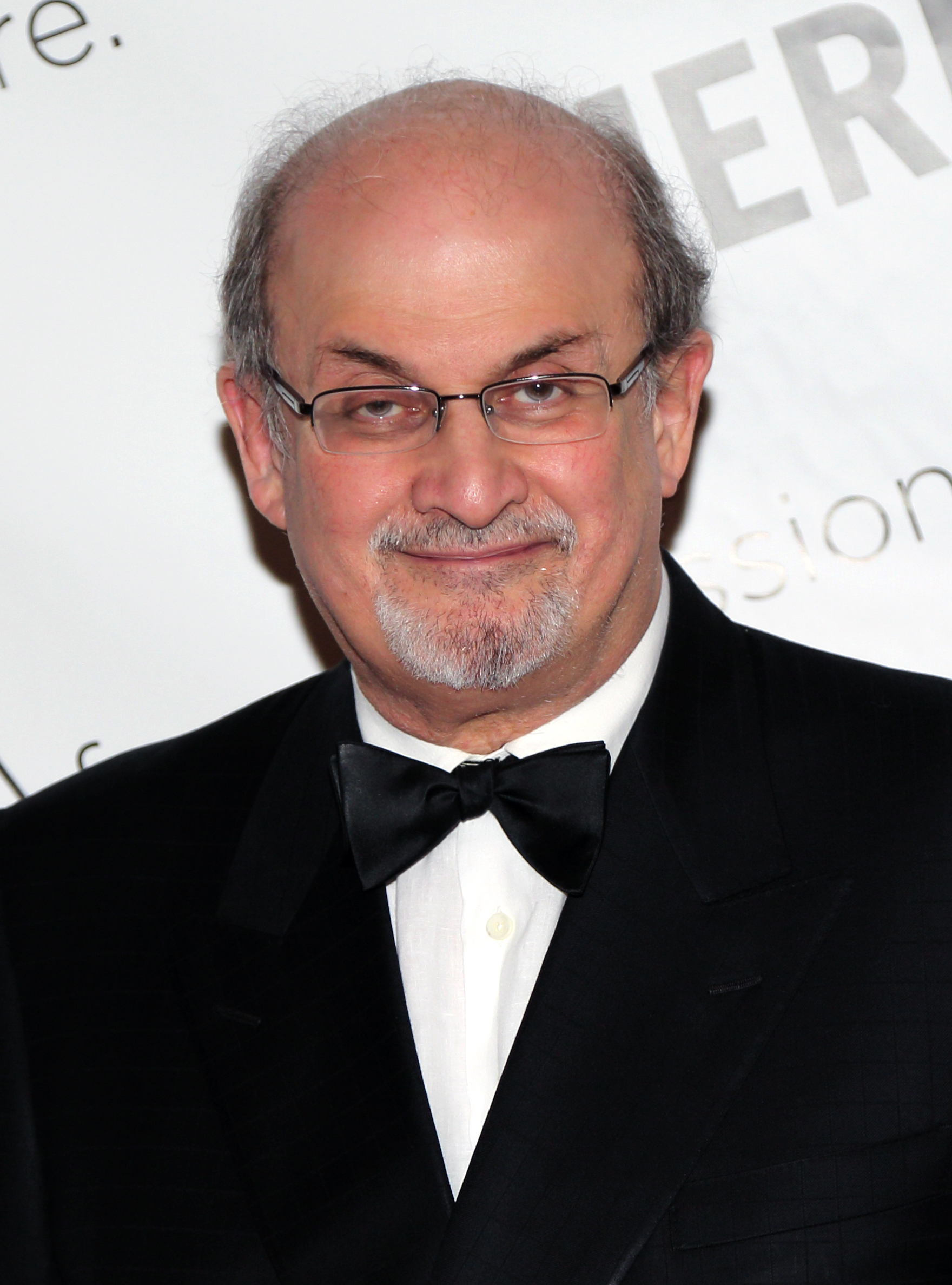
Salman Rushdie in 2014

The Satanic Verses consists of a frame narrative, using elements of magical realism, interlaced with a series of sub-plots that are narrated as dream visions experienced by one of the protagonists. The frame narrative involves Indian expatriates in contemporary England. The two protagonists, Gibreel Farishta and Saladin Chamcha, are both actors of Indian Muslim background. Farishta is a Bollywood superstar who specialises in playing Hindu deities (the character is partly based on Indian film stars Amitabh Bachchan and N. T. Rama Rao). Chamcha, an Anglophile emigrant who has cut himself off from his Indian heritage, works as a voiceover artist in England.

At the beginning of the novel, both are trapped in a plane hijacked by terrorists, flying from India to Britain. The plane explodes over the English Channel. While everyone else on board perishes, Farishta and Chamcha are magically saved. In a miraculous transformation, Farishta takes on the personality of the archangel Gabriel (referred to as Gibreel) and Chamcha that of a devil, complete with horns and goatlike legs. Chamcha is arrested and passes through an ordeal of police brutality as a suspected illegal immigrant.

Both characters struggle to piece their lives back together. Farishta seeks and finds his lost love, the English mountaineer Alleluia "Allie" Cone. However, their relationship is overshadowed by his pathological jealousy and growing sense that he is the Angel Gibreel and other symptoms of schizophrenia. Farishta meets movie producer S. S. Sisodia, who proposes a plan to revitalise his movie career and bring him back to stardom. Meanwhile, Chamcha's devil-like appearance intensifies until he recognizes his anger at Farishta for not defending him from arrest and abandoning him after the plane crash; he is then transformed back into his human shape.

Chamcha wants to take revenge on Farishta. Using his skills as a voice actor, he harasses Farishta and Allie over the phone with messages that foster Farishta's pathological jealousy, ultimately destroying their relationship.

While London is engulfed in escalating political and communal conflict between the conservative government and the immigrant population, Farishta and Chamcha meet again in another moment of crisis. Farishta realizes what Chamcha has done, but instead of enacting revenge saves his life.

Both return to India. Farishta kills Allie in another outbreak of jealousy and then commits suicide. Chamcha, who has found not only forgiveness from Farishta but also reconciliation with his father and his own Indian identity, decides to remain in India.

=== Dream sequences ===
Embedded in this story is a series of half-magic dream vision narratives, ascribed to the mind of Farishta.

One of the sequences is a fictionalised narration of the life of Muhammad (called "Mahound" or "the Messenger" in the novel) in Mecca (called Jahilia in the novel). At its centre is the episode of the so-called satanic verses, in which the prophet first proclaims a revelation requiring the adoption of three of the old polytheistic deities, but later renounces this as an error induced by the Devil. There are also two opponents of the "Messenger": a heathen priestess, Hind, and a sceptic and satirical poet, Baal. When the prophet returns to Mecca in triumph, Baal goes into hiding in an underground brothel, where the prostitutes assume the identities of the prophet's wives. Also, one of the prophet's companions claims that he, doubting the authenticity of the "Messenger," has subtly altered portions of the Quran as they were dictated to him.

The second sequence tells the story of Ayesha, an Indian peasant girl who claims to be receiving revelations from the Archangel Gibreel. She lures all her village community to embark on a foot pilgrimage to Mecca, claiming that they will be able to walk across the Arabian Sea. The pilgrimage ends in a catastrophic climax as the believers all walk into the water and disappear, amid disturbingly conflicting testimonies from observers about whether they simply drowned or were in fact miraculously able to cross the sea.

A third dream sequence presents the figure of a fanatic expatriate religious leader, the "Imam", in a late-20th-century setting, an allusion to Ruhollah Khomeini in his exile in Paris.

== Literary criticism and analysis ==
Overall, the book received favourable reviews from literary critics. In a 2003 volume of criticism of Rushdie's career, the influential critic Harold Bloom named The Satanic Verses "Rushdie's largest aesthetic achievement".

Timothy Brennan called the work "the most ambitious novel yet published to deal with the immigrant experience in Britain" that captures the immigrants' dream-like disorientation and their process of "union-by-hybridization". The book is seen as "fundamentally a study in alienation".

Muhammad Mashuq ibn Ally wrote that "The Satanic Verses is about identity, alienation, rootlessness, brutality, compromise, and conformity. These concepts confront all migrants, disillusioned with both cultures: the one they are in and the one they join. Yet knowing they cannot live a life of anonymity, they mediate between them both. The Satanic Verses is a reflection of the author's dilemmas." The work is an "albeit surreal, record of its own author's continuing identity crisis". Ally said that the book reveals the author ultimately as "the victim of nineteenth-century British colonialism". Rushdie himself spoke confirming this interpretation of his book, saying that it was not about Islam, "but about migration, metamorphosis, divided selves, love, death, London and Bombay". He has also said "It's a novel which happened to contain a castigation of Western materialism. The tone is comic."

After the Satanic Verses controversy developed, some scholars familiar with the book and the whole of Rushdie's work, like M. D. Fletcher, saw the reaction as ironic. Fletcher wrote "It is perhaps a relevant irony that some of the major expressions of hostility toward Rushdie came from those about whom and (in some sense) for whom he wrote." He said the manifestations of the controversy in Britain:

embodied an anger arising in part from the frustrations of the migrant experience and generally reflected failures of multicultural integration, both significant Rushdie themes. Clearly, Rushdie's interests centrally include explorations of how migration heightens one's awareness that perceptions of reality are relative and fragile, and of the nature of religious faith and revelation, not to mention the political manipulation of religion. Rushdie's own assumptions about the importance of literature parallel the literal value accorded the written word in Islamic tradition to some degree. But Rushdie seems to have assumed that diverse communities and cultures share some degree of common moral ground on the basis of which dialogue can be pieced together, and it is perhaps for this reason that he underestimated the implacable nature of the hostility evoked by The Satanic Verses, even though a major theme of that novel is the dangerous nature of closed, absolutist belief systems.

Rushdie's influences have long been a point of interest to scholars examining his work. According to W. J. Weatherby, influences on The Satanic Verses were listed as James Joyce, Italo Calvino, Franz Kafka, Frank Herbert, Thomas Pynchon, Mervyn Peake, Gabriel García Márquez, Jean-Luc Godard, J. G. Ballard, and William S. Burroughs. According to the author himself, he was inspired to write the novel by the work of Mikhail Bulgakov, The Master and Margarita. Angela Carter writes that the novel contains "inventions such as the city of Jahilia, 'built entirely of sand,' that gives a nod to Calvino and a wink to Frank Herbert".

Srinivas Aravamudan's analysis of The Satanic Verses stressed the satiric nature of the work and held that while it and Midnight's Children may appear to be more "comic epic", "clearly those works are highly satirical" in a similar vein of postmodern satire pioneered by Joseph Heller in Catch-22.

The Satanic Verses continued to exhibit Rushdie's penchant for organising his work in terms of parallel stories. Within the book "there are major parallel stories, alternating dream and reality sequences, tied together by the recurring names of the characters in each; this provides intertexts within each novel which comment on the other stories." The Satanic Verses also exhibits Rushdie's common practice of using allusions to invoke connotative links. Within the book he referenced everything from mythology to "one-liners invoking recent popular culture".

== Controversy ==
The novel has been accused of blasphemy for its reference to the "Satanic Verses". Pakistan banned the book in November 1988. On 12 February 1989, 10,000 protesters gathered against Rushdie and the book in Islamabad, Pakistan. Six protesters were killed in an attack on the American Cultural Center, and an American Express office was ransacked. As the violence spread, the importing of the book was banned in India and it was burned in demonstrations in the United Kingdom.

Meanwhile, the Commission for Racial Equality and a liberal think tank, the Policy Studies Institute, held seminars on the Rushdie affair. They did not invite the author Fay Weldon, who spoke out against burning books, but did invite Shabbir Akhtar, a Cambridge philosophy graduate who called for "a negotiated compromise" that "would protect Muslim sensibilities against gratuitous provocation". The journalist and author Andy McSmith wrote at the time "We are witnessing, I fear, the birth of a new and dangerously illiberal 'liberal' orthodoxy designed to accommodate Dr. Akhtar and his fundamentalist friends."

In September 2012, Rushdie expressed doubt that The Satanic Verses would be published today because of a climate of "fear and nervousness".

=== Fatwa ===
In mid-February 1989, following the violent riot against the book in Pakistan, the Ayatollah Ruhollah Khomeini, then Supreme Leader of Iran and a Shiite scholar, issued a fatwa calling for the death of Rushdie and his publishers, and called for Muslims to point him out to those who can kill him if they cannot themselves. Although the British Conservative government under Margaret Thatcher gave Rushdie round-the-clock police protection, many politicians on both sides were hostile to the author. British Labour MP Keith Vaz led a march through Leicester shortly after he was elected in 1989 calling for the book to be banned, while the Conservative politician Norman Tebbit, the party's former chairman, called Rushdie an "outstanding villain" whose "public life has been a record of despicable acts of betrayal of his upbringing, religion, adopted home and nationality".

Journalist Christopher Hitchens defended Rushdie and urged critics to condemn the violence of the fatwa instead of blaming the novel or the author. Hitchens considered the fatwa to be the opening shot in a cultural war on freedom.

In 2021, the BBC broadcast a two-hour documentary by Mobeen Azhar and Chloe Hadjimatheou, interviewing many of the principal denouncers and defenders of the book from 1988–1989, concluding that campaigns against the book were amplified by minority (racial and religious) politics in England and other countries.

Despite a conciliatory statement by Iran in 1998, and Rushdie's declaration that he would stop living in hiding, on 14 February 2006, Iran Focus quoted the opinion of "Martyrs Foundation" (as broadcast on the "Iranian state news agency") that the fatwa will remain in place permanently. This contradicts Shi'ite tradition, in which a fatwa expires when the issuing marja' dies, requiring another living marja' to reissue it.

=== Violence, assassinations, and attempted murders ===
Hitoshi Igarashi, Rushdie's Japanese translator, was found by a cleaning lady, stabbed to death in his office at the University of Tsukuba on 13 July 1991. Ten days prior to Igarashi's killing, Rushdie's Italian translator Ettore Capriolo was seriously injured by an attacker at his home in Milan by being stabbed multiple times on 3 July 1991. William Nygaard, the Norwegian publisher of The Satanic Verses, was critically injured by being shot three times in the back by an assailant on 11 October 1993 in Oslo. Nygaard survived, but spent months in the hospital recovering. The book's Turkish translator Aziz Nesin was the intended target of a mob of arsonists who set fire to the Madimak Hotel after Friday prayers on 2 July 1993 in Sivas, Turkey, killing 37 people, mostly Alevi scholars, poets and musicians. Nesin escaped death when the fundamentalist mob failed to recognize him early in the attack. Known as the Sivas massacre, it is remembered by Alevi Turks who gather in Sivas annually and hold silent marches, commemorations and vigils for the slain.

In March 2016, the bounty for the Rushdie fatwa was raised by $600,000. Top Iranian media contributed this sum, adding to the existing $2.8 million already offered. In response, the Swedish Academy, which awards the Nobel Prize in Literature, denounced the death sentence and called it "a serious violation of free speech". This was the first time it had commented on the issue since the book's publication.

On 12 August 2022, Rushdie was attacked onstage while speaking at an event of the Chautauqua Institution. Rushdie suffered four stab wounds to the stomach area of his abdomen, three wounds to the right side of the front part of his neck, one wound to his right eye, one wound to his chest and one wound to his right thigh. He was flown by helicopter to UPMC Hamot, a tertiary-level hospital in Erie, Pennsylvania. The attacker, Hadi Matar, was immediately taken into custody. He was charged with attempted murder and assault, pleading not guilty, and was remanded in custody. By 14 August, Rushdie was off the ventilator and able to talk. Rushdie's agent Andrew Wylie reported on 23 October that Rushdie had lost sight in one eye and the use of one hand, but survived the murder attempt. On 21 February 2025, Matar was found guilty on both the attempted murder and assault charges. On 16 May 2025, Matar was sentenced to 25 years in prison for attempted murder, plus 7 years concurrent for injuring another person. On 29 July 2026, Matar was convicted of federal terrorism charges, including engaging in an act of transnational terrorism, with federal sentencing set for 3 November 2026. He faces a potential federal sentence of life imprisonment.

== See also ==
- Censorship in India
- Censorship in Pakistan
- Censorship in Afghanistan
- Censorship in Iran
- Censorship in South Asia
- Censorship in the Middle East
- Religious censorship
- Religious intolerance
- Richard Webster (British author)
