= Warrant for Genocide =

Nonfiction book by Norman Cohn

- Author: Norman Cohn
- Language: English
- Genre: Non-fiction
- Publisher: Harper & Row
- Publication date: 1966
- Publication place: United States
- OCLC: 220903085

Warrant for Genocide: The Myth of the Jewish World-Conspiracy and the Protocols of the Elders of Zion, by Norman Cohn, is a critical work about The Protocols of the Elders of Zion, published in 1966.

This scholarly book explores the history, origin, and worldwide dissemination of this notorious, antisemitic plagiarism, literary forgery, and hoax.

== See also ==
- A Brief History of Blasphemy
