= Shabbir Akhtar =

British Muslim philosopher (1960–2023)

Dr Shabbir Akhtar
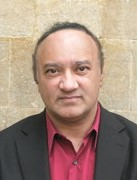
- Born: 1960; Pakistan
- Died: July 24, 2023 (aged 63); Oxford, England
- Education: University of Cambridge; University of Calgary, Alberta, Canada
- Occupations: Philosopher; Writer; Poet; Multilingual scholar
- Website: shabbirakhtar.com

Dr Shabbir Akhtar was a British philosopher, poet, researcher, writer and multilingual scholar. He was on the Faculty of Theology and Religions at the University of Oxford. His interests included political Islam, Quranic exegesis, revival of philosophical discourse in Islam, Islamophobia, extremism, terrorism and Christian-Muslim relations as well as Islamic readings of the New Testament. Shabbir Akhtar was also a Søren Kierkegaard scholar. Akhtar's articles have appeared both in academic journals and in the UK press. Several of his books have been translated into the major Islamic languages.

== Early life and education ==
Shabbir Akhtar was born in Pakistan, raised in Bradford in the United Kingdom. After studying philosophy (BA and MA degrees) at University of Cambridge, Shabbir Akhtar got his PhD in philosophy of religion from University of Calgary, Alberta, Canada (1984), his thesis being "Religion in the Age of Reason: Faith and the Apostasy of Humanism."

== Career ==
Shabbir Akhtar held several academic appointments over the course of his career. From 2012 to 2023, he served as an Associate Member of the Faculty of Theology and Religions at the Oxford University. Between 2002 and 2011, he was Associate Professor of Philosophy at Old Dominion University in the United States. Earlier, from 1994 to 1997, he taught as Assistant Professor of Philosophy at the International Islamic University in Malaysia.

His first book, Reason and the Radical Crisis of Faith (1987), examined the challenges of sustaining religious belief in a secular context. The book was well received, with philosopher and critic Keith Parsons writing that it “should be widely read,” and praising Akhtar’s “insight, wit, and lucidity,” as well as his “scrupulous fairness” in engaging with opposing viewpoints.

In 1989, during the controversy surrounding the publication of The Satanic Verses by Salman Rushdie, Akhtar spoke on behalf of the Bradford Council of Mosques. In a provocative article published in The Guardian on 27 February 1989, he wrote: "There is no choice in the matter. Anyone who fails to be offended by Rushdie's book ipso facto ceases to be a Muslim...Those Muslims who find it intolerable to live in a United Kingdom contaminated with the Rushdie virus need to seriously consider the Islamic alternatives of emigration (hijrah) to the House of Islam or a declaration of holy war (jihād) on the House of Rejection."

The article also included a widely quoted line: "The next time there are gas chambers in Europe, there is no doubt concerning who'll be inside them."

In the mid-1990s, Akhtar returned to academia in Malaysia, but became disillusioned with what he perceived as a lack of commitment to rational thought in educational practice within Muslim-majority societies.

In later years, Akhtar published a number of philosophically rigorous and polemically engaged works aiming to articulate a contemporary Islamic philosophical framework.

== Publications ==
=== Books in English ===
- Be Careful with Muhammad! Salman Rushdie and the Battle for Free Speech (2nd Edition), Jakarta: Bijak, 2020, 187 p.
- The New Testament in Muslim Eyes: Paul's Letter to the Galatians, London: Routledge, 2018, 284 p.
- Islam as Political Religion: The Future of an Imperial Faith, London: Routledge, 2010, 301 p.
- The Quran and the Secular Mind: A Philosophy of Islam, London: Routledge, 2008, 400 p.
- Love in the Wrong Season: Collected Poems, London: Melisende, 2000, 77 p.
- Muslim Poetic Imagination, London: Scorpion, 1992, 87 p.
- The Final Imperative: An Islamic Theology of Liberation, London: Bellew, 1991, 116 p.
- A Faith for All Seasons: Islam and the Challenge of the Modern World, London: Bellew, 1990, Chicago: Ivan R. Dee, 1991, 251 p.
- The Light in the Enlightenment: Christianity and the Secular Heritage, London: Grey Seal, 1990, 213 p.
- A Season in the Ghetto: Collected Poems, London: Regency, 1989, 48 p.
- Be Careful with Muhammad!: The Salman Rushdie Affair, London: Bellew, 1989, 136 p.
- The Mother of Judas Iscariot and Other Poems, London: Regency, 1988, 36 p.
- Reason and the Radical Crisis of Faith, New York: Peter Lang, 1987, 281 p.

=== Books translated into French ===
- Ne Touchez pas à Mahomet ! Salman Rushdie et la Bataille pour la Liberté d’Expression, Jakarta: Bijak, 2022.

=== Books translated into Bosnian ===
- Oprezno S Muhammedom! Afera Salman Rushdie, Bośnia: CNS, 2020.
- Islam Kao Politicka Religija: Buducnost Jedne Imperijalne Vjere, Bośnia: CNS, 2018.

=== Books translated into Indonesian ===
- Mengungkap Kelicikan Barat Sekuler dengan Kasus Ayat-ayat Setan, Indonesia: Firdaus, 1992.
- Islam Agama Semua Zaman, Indonesia: Pustaka Zahra, 2002.
- Merancang Teologi Pembebasan Islam Adakah Perang Dingin Baru: Barat vs Islam, Indonesia: Nuansa Cendekia, 2002.
- Emansipasi Kekuatan Islam: Menolak Fasisme & Totalitarianisme, Indonesia: Nuansa Cendekia, 2007.

=== Book Contributions ===
- 'Prophet Warning: Justification, Retribution and Salvation in Islam – A Comparative Study’, in P. Koslowski (ed.), The Anxiety of End-Time (Munich: Wilhelm Fink, 2012).
- ‘The Revival of Philosophy among Muslims’, in D. Cheetham and R. King (Eds.) Contemporary Practice and Method in the Philosophy of Religion (London: Continuum/T&T Clark, 2008).
- ‘The Dialogue of Islam and the World Faiths: The Role of Speculative Philosophy’, in P. Koslowski (ed.), Philosophy Bridging the World Religions (Boston, Mass.: Kluwer Academic, 2003).
- ‘The Limits of Internal Hermeneutics’ and ‘Critical Quranic Scholarship and Theological Puzzles’, in H. Vroom and J. Gort (eds.), Holy Scriptures in Judaism, Christianity and Islam (Amsterdam, Atlanta: Rodopi, 1997).
- ‘The Possibility of a Philosophy of Islam’, in O. Leaman and S.H.Nasr (eds.), The Routledge History of Islamic Philosophy (London: Routledge, 1995).
- ‘Relationships Between Muslim Parents and Children in a Non-Muslim Country’, in M. King (ed.), God's Law versus State Law (London: Grey Seal, 1995).
- ‘The Future of Christian-Muslim Relations’, in D. Cohn-Sherbok (ed.), The Canterbury Papers, (London: Bellew, 1992).
- ‘The Limits of Liberalism’ in Bhikhu Parekh (ed.), Free Speech (London: Commission for Racial Equality, 1990).
- ‘Art or Literary Terrorism?’, in D. Cohn-Sherbok (ed.), The Salman Rushdie Controversy in Interreligious Perspective (Lampeter: The Edwin Mellen Press, 1990).

=== Book reviews ===
- Is Islam an ethnic, ethical, or juridical religion? Reflections on revelation, reason and power, The Muslim World Book Review, 43:3, 2023.
- Religion in the Age of Rage: The Uses and Abuses of Faith, The Muslim World Book Review, 40:3, 2020.
- The Twin 'Terrors': Political Islam and the Shari'ah, The Muslim World Book Review, 39:1, 2018.
- ‘At War with Modernity’ by D. Pryce-Jones, Muslim World Book Review, Vol.14, No. 1 (1993), pp. 4–5.
- ‘Where East meets West’ by M. Abul-Fadl and ‘Cultural Schizophrenia’ by D. Shayegan, Muslim World Book Review, Vol.13, No.3 (1993), pp. 25–27.
- ‘The Arab Christian’ by Kenneth Cragg, Muslim World Book Review, Vol.13, No.1 (1992) pp. 49–50.
- ‘Islam in a World of Diverse Faiths’ by Rabbi D. Cohn-Sherbok, Muslim World Book Review, Vol.12, No.2 (1992), pp. 30–32.
- ‘The Uneasy Alliance: Religion, Refugee Work, and US Foreign Policy’ by Bruce Nichols, Ethics, Vol. 100, No.1 (1989), p. 225.
- Review of Theism by Clement Dore, The Journal of Religion, Vol. 66, No. 4 (Oct., 1986), pp. 451–452

=== Journal articles ===
- "Cultivating Faithful Enthusiasm: How the Qur’an Creates Transformative Willpower,Yaqeen Institute for Islamic Research (2022).
- "A Path Straightened Out: Perspectives on Human Nature in the Qur’an", Yaqeen Institute for Islamic Research (2020).
- "Can an Islamic Natural Theology Explain God’s Silence Today?", Renovatio, Fall 2019, pp 1–14.
- "Finding and Following Jesus: The Muslim Claim to the Messiah", Yaqeen Institute for Islamic Research (2018).
- "The Dialogue of Islam and the World Faiths: The Role of Speculative Philosophy", Philosophy Bridging the World Religions, Kluwer Academic Publishers (2003), pp 21–37.
- "The possibility of a philosophy of Islam", History of Islamic Philosophy (Edited by Seyyed Hossein Nasr and Oliver Leaman), Routledge (1996), pp 2065–2077.
- "An Islamic Model of Revelation", Islam and Christian-Muslim Relations, Vol.2, No.1 (1991), pp. 95–105.
- "Faust and the New Idolaters: Reflections on shirk", Islam and Christian-Muslim Relations, Vol.1, No.2 (1990), pp. 252–260.
- "Miracles as Evidence for the Existence of God", Scottish Journal of Religious Studies, Vol.11, No. 1, Spring (1990), pp. 18–23.
- "Is there an Epistemic Parity Between Faith and Rejection?", The Southern Journal of Philosophy, Vol.26, No.3 (1988), pp. 293–305.
- "The Virtues of Fundamentalist Exegesis", Scottish Journal of Religious Studies, Vol.9, No.2 (1988), pp. 41–49.
- "Religious Messages and Cultural Myths", Sophia, Vol.25, No.3 (1986), pp. 32–40.

=== Non-academic articles ===
- Akhtar, Shabbir (1 October 2020). "Killing for the sake of something called Art". The Jakarta Post, Indonesia.
- Akhtar, Shabbir (29 January 1994). "Faith & Reason: Islam avoids the dangers of doubt". Independent, UK.
- Akhtar, Shabbir (23 January 1993). Faith and Reason: A common duty to cultivate rivalry in good works. Independent, UK.
- Akhtar, Shabbir (21 August 1992). Faith and Reason: Islam's virtuous way for the wealthy man. Independent, UK.
