= Norman Cohn =

British historian (1915–2007)

Norman Cohn FBA
- Born: Norman Rufus Colin Cohn; 12 January 1915; London, England
- Died: 31 July 2007 (aged 92); Cambridge, England
- Education: Christ Church, Oxford
- Occupations: Historian, academic, writer
- Spouses: Vera Broido (until her death); Marina Voikhanskaya (2004–2007)
- Children: Nik Cohn
- Parents: August Cohn (father); Daisy Ann Rainer (mother)

Norman Rufus Colin Cohn FBA (12 January 1915 – 31 July 2007) was a British academic, historian and writer who spent 14 years as a professorial fellow and as Astor-Wolfson Professor at the University of Sussex.

== Life ==
Cohn was born in London, to a German Jewish father and a Catholic mother. He was educated at Gresham's School and Christ Church, Oxford. According to the Italian scholar Lorenzo Ferrari, "Cohn grew up feeling 'a man between all worlds' with his German-Jewish surname, his mother's Catholic faith (although she never had him baptised), and his numerous German relatives". He was a scholar and research student at Christ Church between 1933 and 1939, taking a first-class degree in Modern Languages in 1936 (French) and in 1939 (German). He served for six years in the British Army, being commissioned into the Queen's Royal Regiment in 1939 and transferring to the Intelligence Corps in 1944, where his knowledge of modern languages found employment.

In 1941, he married Vera Broido, with whom he had a son, the writer Nik Cohn. In the immediate post-war period, he was stationed in Vienna, ostensibly to interrogate Nazis, but he encountered many refugees from Stalinism, and the similarities in persecutorial obsessions evinced both by Nazism and Stalinism fueled his interest in the historical background for these ideologically opposed, yet functionally similar movements. After his discharge, he taught successively in universities in Scotland, Ireland, England, the United States and Canada.

In 1962, Cohn approached Observer editor David Astor after Astor gave a speech on the psychopathological roots of extremism. Cohn became the head of the Centre for Research in Collective Psychopathology (later, Columbus Centre), which was set up and initially financed by Astor to look into the causes of extremism and persecution. In 1966, the Centre was formally set up as a research project at the University of Sussex. From 1973 to 1980, Cohn was Astor-Wolfson Professor of History at Sussex.

Following the death of his wife Vera, in December 2004 he married Marina Voikhanskaya, a psychiatrist of Russian origin who had protested in the 1970s against the forcible detainment of political dissidents in the Soviet Union. Norman Cohn died on 31 July 2007, in Cambridge, England, at the age of 92, from a degenerative heart condition.

== Career ==
Cohn's work as a historian focused on the problem of the roots of that persecutorial fanaticism which became resurgent in modern Europe at a time when industrial progress and the spread of democracy had convinced many that modern civilisation had stepped out forever from the savageries of earlier historical societies. In his The Pursuit of the Millennium, an influential work translated into more than eleven languages, he traced back to the distant past the pattern of chiliastic upheaval that marred the revolutionary movements of the 20th century. Likewise, in Europe's Inner Demons he tracked the historical sources of the mania for scapegoating minorities which, within Christendom, culminated in the Great European witchhunt.

His book Warrant for Genocide describes the Protocols of the Elders of Zion, an antisemitic forgery purporting to describe a Jewish conspiracy for world domination and its influence and effects. He argued that this conspiracy theory motivated its supporters to seek the massacre of the Jewish people and became a major psychological factor in the Nazi Holocaust.

In Cosmos, Chaos and the World to Come (1993), he sought to trace the source of millennial religious themes in ancient civilizations. Cohn, with his background in dealing with totalitarian regimes and the sufferings of his relatives during the Holocaust, described all his work as studies on the phenomena that sought "to purify the world through the annihilation of some category of human beings imagined as agents of corruption and incarnations of evil".

His work was honoured by his election as a Fellow of the British Academy, for which he was nominated by Isaiah Berlin. His The Pursuit of the Millennium was ranked as one of the 100 most influential books of the 20th century in a survey conducted by The Times Literary Supplement.

As Ferrari pointed out, "the writings of Norman Cohn have gone on to influence entire generations of readers and scholars, from all sorts of backgrounds and vocations. Through their works, historians Stuart Clark (Thinking with Demons, 1997), Michael Burleigh (The Third Reich, 2000; Earthly Powers, 2005; Sacred Causes, 2006), Daniel Pick (The Pursuit of the Nazi Mind, 2012), philosophers Pierre-André Taguieff (L’imaginaire du complot mondial, 2006), John Nicholas Gray (Black Mass, 2007) and novelists William Gibson and Ian McEwan have evidenced their intellectual debt to Cohn, who—in the words of psychiatrist Anthony Storr—dedicated his entire life to ‘the important parts of history other historians do not reach: the collective myths that underpin the assumptions, prejudices and beliefs which shake and shape human societies’".

== Works ==
Books

- The Pursuit of the Millennium: A History of Popular Religious and Social Movements in Europe From the Eleventh to the Sixteenth Century (1957)
- Warrant for Genocide: The Myth of the Jewish World Conspiracy and the "Protocols of the Elders of Zion" (1967), a scholarly study on the myth of the Jewish world domination conspiracy, especially as evidenced in the fabricated The Protocols of the Elders of Zion document
- Europe's Inner Demons: An Enquiry Inspired by the Great Witch-Hunt (1975) revised edition Europe's Inner Demons: The Demonization of Christians in Medieval Christendom (1993)
- Cosmos, Chaos and the World to Come: The Ancient Roots of Apocalyptic Faith (1993, revised edition 2001)
- Noah's Flood: The Genesis Story in Western Thought (1996)

Essays

- "The Horns of Moses", Commentary, vol. 3 (September 1958)
- "The Myth of the Jewish World Conspiracy: A Case Study in Collective Psychopathology", Commentary, vol. 41, no. 6 (June 1966) 35
- "Monsters of Chaos", Horizon: Magazine of the Arts, no. 4 (1972), 42
- "Permanence de Millénarismes", Le Contrat Social: revue historique et critique des faits et des idées, vol. 6, no. 5 (September 1962) 289
- "Adamo: the Distinguished Savage", The Twentieth Century, vol. 155 (January 1954), 263
- "The Saint-Simonian Extravaganza", The Twentieth Century, vol. 154 (July 1953), 354
- "The Magus of the North", The Twentieth Century, vol. 153 (January 1953), 283
- "The Saint-Simonian Portent", The Twentieth Century, vol. 152 (July 1952)
- "How Time Acquired a Consummation", in Apocalypse Theory and the End of the World (1995), 21–37(compilation)

== Sources ==
- Who's Who 2007 (London: A. & C. Black, 2007)
- Obituary in The Daily Telegraph, 3 August 2007
- Obituary in The Guardian, 9 August 2007
- Obituary in The New York Times, 27 August 2007
- Lamont, William (2009). "Norman Rufus Colin Cohn (1915 - 2007) Proceedings of the British Academy, 161, 87–108" (PDF). The British Academy.
- Lorenzo Ferrari, Norman Cohn e il lato oscuro della Storia. Una biografia culturale, Milano, FrancoAngeli, 2023.
