= Davoud Amirian =

Iranian contemporary writer (born 1970)

- داوود امیریان
- Born: 1970 (age 55–56); Kerman, Kerman province, Imperial State of Iran
- Occupations: Writer; Screenwriter

Davoud Amirian (Persian: داوود امیریان), is a contemporary Iranian writer. He has published more than 26 books and won several awards. He is currently working on writing memoirs, children's and adolescent literature, novels, comics, biographies of martyrs and screenwriting.

== Life ==
Davoud Amirian was born in 1970 in Kerman. He began his writing career in 1990 by writing his memoirs about the Iran-Iraq War. Some people consider him one of the top five writers on the Iran-Iraq War and introduce him as the first generation of writers on the Iran-Iraq War subject.

== Bibliography ==
The books "Farzandane Iranim (title means We Are Children of Iran)", "Refaghat beh Sabke Tank (title means Friendship in the Style of a tank)" and "Doostan Khodahafezi Nemikonand (title means Friends do not say goodbye)", "Dastane Behnam (title means The Story of Behnam)", "Dastane Maryam (title means The Story of Maryam)", "Tavllode Yek Parvaneh (title means Birth of a Butterfly)" and "Jame Jahani dar Javadieh (title means World Cup in Javadiyeh)" are some of his most famous fiction works. Some of these books won the Iran's Book of the Year Awards, Holy Defense Year Book Award, Award of Institute for the Intellectual Development of Children and Young Adults and dozens of other awards.

- Khodahafez Karkheh (title means Goodbye Karkheh), his first work, 1990
- Farmandeye Man (title means My commander), 1990
- Behesht Baraye Tow (title means Heaven for you), 1991
- Iraj Khasteh Ast (title means Iraj is tired), 1994
- Mine Nokhodi (title means The little Mine), 1996
- Akharin Savare Sarnevesht (title means The last rider of destiny), 1997
- Farzandane Iranim (title means We are Children of Iran), 1999
- Aghaye Shahrdar (title means Mr. Mayor), 2000
- Dastane Behnam (title means The Story of Behnam), Biography of Behnam Mohammadi, 2002
- Tavllode Yek Parvaneh (title means Birth of a Butterfly), 2002
- Doostan Khodahafezi Nemikonand (title means Friends do not say goodbye), 2003
- Matarsake Mazraeye Atashin (title means Fire Farm Scarecrow), 2003
- Refaghat beh Sabke Tank (title means Friendship in the style of a tank), 2003
- Marde Bahari (title means The Spring man), 2003
- Lahzeye Jodayi Man (title means The moment of my separation), 2003
- Jame Jahani dar Javadieh (title means World Cup in Javadiyeh), 2004
- Dow Salahshouro Nesfi (title means Two warriors and half), 2004
- Leyli (title means Lily), 2005
- Pesarane Nime Shab (title means Midnight Boys), 2006
- Sarbaze Kouchake Eslam (title means Little Soldier of Islam), 2007
- Akharin Golouleye Sayad (title means The Last Bullet of Sayad), Biography of Ali Sayad Shirazi, 2007
- Dastane Maryam (title means The Story of Maryam), biography of Maryam Farhanian, 2007
- Vaghti Aghajan Dastgir Shod (title means When Aghajan was arrested), 2008
- Hoveyzeh (title means The curb), 2008
- Akharin Negah (title means Last look), 2008
- Mardha Ham Geryeh Mikonand (title means Men cry too), 2008
- Yek Nafas Ta Bahar (title means One breath until spring), 2009
- Balouch Geryeh Nemikonad (title means Balouch does not cry), 2010
- Behesht Montazer Mimanad (title means Heaven is waiting), 2010
- Gordane Ghaterchiha (title means The Skinners Battalion), 2011
- Shahid Behnam Mohammadi (title means Martyr Behnam Mohammadi), 2012
- Khomparehaye Fased (title means Corrupt mortars), 2013
- Halazoune Man Gomshode (title means My snail is missing), 2014
- Farare Shahaneh (title means Royal Escape), 2015
- Yarane Aftab (title means Friends of the sun), 2015
- Koodakestane Agha Morsel (title means Mr. Morsel Kindergarten), 2016
- Dar Masafe Gorgha (title means In the fight against wolves), 2016
- Mehrabantarin Aghaye Donya (title means The kindest gentleman in the world), 2016
- Hemaseh Aghaz Mishavad (title means The epic begins), 2016
- Shekarchie Shir (title means The lion hunter), 2016
- Sarbedar (title means Head to gallows), 2017
- Baradare Man Toyi (title means You are my brother), 2018
- Tarkeshe Velgar (title means The stray quiver), 2018
- Mard (title means The man), 2018
- Shahri Por az Mehrbani va Mobarezeh (title means A city full of kindness and struggle), 2018
- Moghabeleh ba Peymane Shoom (title means Confront with the ominous pact), 2018
- Mehmanie Baghe Sib (title means Apple Garden Party), 2019
- Jostojougarane Shamshire Edalat (title means Seekers of the Sword of Justice), 2019
- Payegahe Serri (title means Secret base), 2019

== Screenplays ==
Some of Davoud Amirian's works have been used as screenplays in Iranian cinema and television. Most famous movies among his works that have been produced and screened are Akharin Nabard (film title means The Last Battle) directed by Hamid Bahmani, Behesht Montazer Mimanad (film title means Heaven is waiting) directed by Mohammad Reza Ahanj and Nofouzi (film title means The informer) directed by Ahmad Kaveri and Mehdi Fayouzi.

- Akharin Nabard (film title means The Last Battle) directed by Hamid Bahmani, 1997
- Nofouzi (film title means informer) directed by Ahmad Kaveri and Mehdi Fayouzi, 2008
- Galougahe Sheytan (film title means Devil's Throat) directed by Hamid Bahmani, 2010
- Behesht Montazer Mimanad (film title means Heaven is waiting) directed by Mohammad Reza Ahanj, 2011

== See also ==
- Majid Gheisari
- Tahereh Saffarzadeh
- Seyyed Mahdi Shojaee
- Ahad Gudarziani
- Masoumeh Abad
- Ahmad Dehqan
- Akbar Sahraee
- Holy Defense Year Book Award
