= Saeed Akef =

Iranian author and memoir writer (born 1972)

- Born: 1972 (age 53–54); Tehran, Iran
- Occupations: Writer; Publisher
- Awards: 10th Holy Defense Year Book Award Nominee

Saeed Akef (Persian: سعید عاکف, born 1972) is an Iranian author and memoir writer who often writes about the Iran–Iraq War. His books have been among the most widely published books about that war. Borunsi (2004) has been reprinted more than 200 times since its first edition, and is amongst the bestselling books in Iran. Nasime Taghdir (Breeze of Destiny) has been a nominee in the 10th Holy Defense Year Book Award.

== Life and careers ==
Saeed Akef was born in Tehran in 1972. He completed his primary education in Tehran. After a while he became interested in the field of religious studies and therefore immigrated to Mashhad to continue his studies. He was deployed to the front at the end year of the Iran–Iraq War and spent about three months there. He spent his teenage years practicing writing. Akef began writing small articles for newspapers. Since 1985, he has encouraged his writing skills by participating in storytelling and story criticism classes. After the war, he became interested in writing about the war and began writing biographies of martyrs. After some time working in the field of the Iran–Iraq War, Akef established a publishing house and entered the publishing industry. He has published dozens of books so far, some of which have received awards.

== Bibliography ==
Most of Akef's books are about the Iran–Iraq War. Some of these are multi-volume books.

- Hekayate Zemestan (title means The story of winter), 1990
- KhakHaye Narme Kushk (the soft soils of Kushk), published in English as Borunsi), 1999
- Arvand va Khatereye Avvalin Ghayeq (title means Arvand and the memory of the first boat), 2000
- Sakenane Molke Azam (title means Residents of the Grand Estate), 2006
- Jaye Khalie Khakriz (title means Embankment vacancy), 2008
- Mosaferane Malakoot (title means The Heavenly Travelers), 2006
- Hajar dar Entezar (title means Hajar in Waiting), 2009
- Raghs dar Dele Atash (title means Dance In The Heart Of Fire), 2000
- Nasime Taghdir (title means Breeze of Destiny), 2003
- Khaterate Shegoft (title means Wonderful memories), 2013
- Yadegaran: Ketabe Naseri (title means The Keepers: Book of Naseri), 2008
- Bazme Baran (title means Banquet of the rain), 2018
- Gomshodeye Mazar Sharif (title means The Lost in Mazar-i-Sharif), 2016
- In Sardare Asemani: Khaterate Sardare Shahid Habib Lakzayi (title means This Heavenly Commander: Memoirs of Martyr Habib Lakzayi), 2017
- Ziarate Sharife Ale Yasin: Raveshe Jame Barghararie Ertebat ba Mola Sahebaz Zaman (AJ) be Amr va Dastoore Khodeshan (title means Honorable Ale-Yasin Pilgrimage: Comprehensive way of communicating with Mullah Saheb Zaman on his own orders), 2016
- Ketabe Shahid Amirabbasi (title means The Book of Martyr Amirabbasi), 2014
- Osveha: Shahid Kaveh (title means Exemplars: Martyr Kaveh), 2005
- SarvQamatane Javdaneh "Yadvareye Farmandehan va Modirane Shahide Amoozeshe Sepah", "Vijeye Ostane Khorasan" (title means The Eternal Cedar statures "Commemoration of the Martyrs Commanders and Managers of Sepah training", "Special to Khorasan Province"), 2004
- Kelide Fathe Bostan (title means The key to conquering Bostan), 2003
- Az Akharin Savarane Ill "Majmooe Khaterate Shahid Naseri" (title means From the last riders of the tribe "Martyr Naseri Memories Collection"), 2003
- Shame Barfi (authors: Mohammad Mahmoudi Nourabadi and Saeed Akef, title means The Snow Dinner), 2015

== Awards ==
Akef's book Nasime Taghdir (Breeze of Destiny) was one of the top selected books of the 10th Holy Defense Year Book Award in 2006. It also won third place in the Oral Memories section of the same festival.

== Translated book ==
Akef's book KhakHaye Narme Kushk (the soft soils of Kushk), has been translated into English, Arabic and Urdu. The English translation has been published under the English title Borunsi. The Urdu translation has been published under the Urdu title Goodbye Baba in India.

== See also ==
- Majid Gheisari
- Ahad Gudarziani
- Masoumeh Abad
- Nasrollah Mardani
- Morteza Avini
- Tahereh Saffarzadeh
- Seyyed Mahdi Shojaee
- Mohammad Doroudian
- Hamid Reza Shekarsari
