= Mohammad Doroudian =

Iranian writer, historian, researcher and theorist

- محمد درودیان
- Born: 1959 (age 66–67); Tehran, Iran
- Education: Shahid Beheshti University (B.A.)
- Occupations: Writer, historian, researcher and theorist
- Style: Politics, War
- Awards: Holy Defense Year Book Award (8th); Iran's Book of the Year Awards (31st)
- Website: http://www.m-doroodian.ir/

Mohammad Doroudian (Persian: محمد درودیان) is an Iranian writer, historian, researcher and theorist. Doroudian was born on 1959 in Tehran, and actively writes about the history of the Iran-Iraq War. He holds a BA in History from Shahid Beheshti University. More than seventeen books have been published by Mohammad Doroudian so far. He is one of the elect of the 31st Iran's Book of the Year Awards and the winner of the 8th Holy Defense Year Book Award.

== Life and educations ==
Mohammad Doroudian was born in Tehran, Iran in 1959. He spent elementary school in one of the lower schools of Tehran. But because of the poor financial situation, he was forced to work and earn a living, so he went to night school in the second year of secondary school. Since 1980, his studies were interrupted by his presence in the Iran-Iraq War. In 1987, he was admitted to Shahid Beheshti University, but again due to the war he began his studies with two years delay in 1989. He finally completed his university studies in 1992 and obtained his bachelor's degree in history.

== Careers ==
He has various responsibilities over the years, some of which include:

- Established war historiography section in Islamic Revolutionary Guard Corps
- Designing and organizing the Iran-Iraq war journalistic newsletter project
- Head of the Office of War Studies and Research at the General Staff of the Armed Forces of the Islamic Republic of Iran
- Secretary of the Threats and Coping Group in the Strategic Research Center at the General Staff of the Armed Forces of the Islamic Republic of Iran
- Advisor to the Secretary of the General Staff of the Armed Forces of the Islamic Republic of Iran
- Secretary of Deputy of Defense Secretariat at the Supreme National Security Council
- Editor-in-Chief of the Iran-Iraq War Quarterly Journal (Negin)

== Awards ==
Mohammad Doroudian was one of the elect of the 31st Iran's Book of the Year Awards in 2014 and the winner of the 8th Holy Defense Year Book Award in 2003.

Also, his book "Ravande Payane Jang" was one of the Top Books of the 10th Holy Defense Year Book Award in the field of military research in 2006.

== Bibliography ==
- Beginning to End: A Review of Political-Military Events of the Iran-Iraq War From the Basis of the Iraqi Invasion to the Ceasefire
- The war inevitability
- End of War: Analysis of Political-Military Events of the Iran-Iraq War From Operation Walfajre 10 to the Occupation of Kuwait
- Basic War Questions: A Critique of the Iran-Iraq War
- Iran-Iraq War Analysis: War, Restoration of Stability; An Overview of Military Political Developments from 1980 to 1982
- The Iran-Iraq War, Subjects and Issues
- Khorramshahr to Faw: Military-Political Study of the Iran-Iraq War after Liberation of Khorramshahr to Conquest of the Faw and Liberation of Mehran
- Khorramshahr in a Long War: A Review of Political-Military Events in Khorramshahr Before the Islamic Revolution Till the Invasion of the Iraqi Army and the Epic Report of the City's Bloody Resistance
- Bloody Town to Khorramshahr: Investigation and Military-Political Events of the War From the Basis of the Iraqi Invasion to the Liberation of Khorramshahr
- The process of the end of the war
- Shalamcheh to Halabja: A Study of the Political-Military Events of the conflict with the United States in Persian-Gulf in 1987
- The Causes of Continuing War
- Faw to Shalamcheh: Study of military-political events of the Iran-Iraq war from the end of Operation Walfajre 8 to the end of Operation Karbala 8
- Strategic options for war
- Analyzing the Iran-Iraq War: An Introduction to a Theory
- Battle of East Basra: Design, Command and execute of operation Karbala 5
- Basic issues of war in the published works of the Army and the Corps

== Theories ==
Doroudian's theories are often about the political and historical events in Iran. Some of his most important theories include declaring 25 October 1980 as the day of the fall of Khorramshahr instead of 26 October 1980. According to his narrative, the countdown to the fall of Khorramshahr began on 16 October 1980 and ended on 25 October 1980. According to the available documents and reports, the defenders of Khorramshahr fought with zeal until the last moment.

== See also ==
- Majid Gheisari
- Tahereh Saffarzadeh
- Seyyed Mahdi Shojaee
- Ahad Gudarziani
- Masoumeh Abad
- Ahmad Dehqan
- Akbar Sahraee
- Holy Defense Year Book Award
- Saeed Akef
- Hamid Reza Shekarsari
