= Esmaeel Azar =

Iranian writer

- اسماعیل آذر
- Born: Amir Esmaeel Azar; 9 December 1944 (age 81); Isfahan, Imperial State of Iran
- Education: Master's degree in Comparative literature; PhD in Persian Language and Literature
- Occupations: Author; Researcher; Professor of Persian Language and Literature; TV Presenter; Poet; Translator
- Children: Amir-Hossein

Esmaeel Azar or Amir Esmaeel Azar (Persian: اسماعیل آذر, born 9 December 1944, Isfahan, Iran) is a professor of Persian literature and director of the Department of Persian Language at the Islamic Azad University, Science and Research Branch, Tehran, and director of the Farhangbân Cultural and Artistic Institute. He also works as a presenter on literary programs on Iranian television, including the "Watching the Oath and the Beginning of the Word" (Poetry-related TV program). He is a member of the Art commission at the Supreme Council of the Cultural Revolution, Director of the Persian Literature Department at the Economic Cooperation Organization, Member of the Naming Committee at the National Organization for Civil Registration of Iran, member of the scientific commissions of the Public Libraries of Iran and a member of the board of directors of the Comparative Literature Association of Iran.

== Personal life ==
He was born on 9 December 1944 in Isfahan, Iran. His mother was the principal of a girls' high school in Isfahan and his father was a government employee. He has two sisters and a brother. He left Isfahan when he was 22 years old to study in Tehran. He married at 30 and has a son named Amir-Hossein.

== Education and career ==
He completed his primary and secondary education at Hatef Primary and Secondary School in Isfahan and then studied radiation therapy at the University of Isfahan, but left school and went to Tehran where he studied music and then him to Persian literature. He received a master's degree in comparative literature and then a doctorate in Persian language and literature.

He joined the radio at the age of 18 and began making programs for it.

He has also performed on Iranian television since 1992 as a host of poetry programs.

He has been a scientific advisor and head of the Department of Persian Language and Literature at the Higher Education Institute of Culture and Art He has also published books on Persian literature and translated books into Persian.

== Bibliography ==
- Saadi Shenasi (title means Recognition of Saadi), 1996
- Jane Jahan – Majmooe Soroudehaye Shaerane Moaser Dar Manghebate emame Asheghan (title means The Spirit of World – a collection of poems by contemporary poets in the praise of Imam of lovers), 1999
- Mirase Eshgh, Jameh Shere Ashoura Ba Moghaddameye Mofassal Piramoon Dar Shere Dini (title means The Legacy of Love, a comprehensive Ashura poem with a detailed introduction to religious poetry), 2002
- Adabiate Iran Dar Adabiate Jahan (title means Iranian literature in world literature), 2008
- Tarikhe Hezar Saleye Shere Farsi Darbareye Imam Reza (title means The thousand-year history of Persian poetry about Imam Reza), 2008
- Khorshide Khorasan – Tarikh Va Jameh Shere Imam Reza (title means The Sun of Khorasan – History and comprehensive poetry about Imam Reza), 2008
- Shokouhe Eshgh: Tarikh Va Shere Ashura (title means The Glory of Love: History and Poetry of Ashura), 2009
- Ebratgahe Tarikh: Sargozashthaye Khandani Va Ebrat Amouze Tarikhe Iran (title means History lesson: readable and instructive stories of Iranian history), 2010
- Tasire Hafez Bar Adabiate Gharb (title means The influence of Hafez on West literature), 2011
- Daneshnameye Nowrouz (title means Nowruz Encyclopedia), 2011
- Hafez Dar Ansouye Marzha: Pazhouheshi Dar Adabiate Tatbighi (title means Hafez Across Borders: A Study in Comparative Literature), 2011
- Avaye Pahlevani: Morouri Bar Tarikhe Ayyari Va Javanmardi Dar Iran (title means The Voice of Heroism: A Review of the History of Chastity and Manliness in Iran), 2013
- Elahi Nameye Attar Dar Nazariyeye Neshaneh, Manashenasi Alzhir Germes Va Sheklshenasie Gérard Genette (title means Theological Letter of Attar in sign theory, semantics of Algirdas Greimas and Gérard Genette's morphology), 2014
- Qoran Dar Shere Parsi (title means Quran in Persian poetry), 2015

=== Compilation ===
- Nasimi Az Bokhara: Gozideh Ashare Roudaki (title means A Breeze from Bukhara: Selection of Rudaki poems), 2010
- Ketabe Moshaereh (title means Book of Poetry), 2011
- Sarzamine Nowrouz: Pishineh, Adab va Rosum (title means Nowruz Land: Background, customs), 2011

=== Translations ===
- Eshtiagh (Persian Translation of Poetry named Desire from Kahlil Gibran), 1989
- Shahkarhaye Adabie Jahan (Persian Translation of Masterpieces of World Literature by Frank Northen Magill), 2009

=== Cooperations ===
- Farsi Omoumi (title means General Persian), 2008
- Divane Hafez (title means The Divan of Hafez), 2011
- Hemasehaye Maktabi (title means The Doctrine Epics), 2011
- Robaeeyate Hakim Omar Khayyam 5 Zabane -Farsi, Arabi, Englisi, Faranse, Almani- (title means Quartet of Hakim Omar Khayyam 5 languages -Persian, Arabic, English, French, German-), 2012
- Moshaereh: Bargozideyi Az Zibatarin Sherhaye Adabe Farsi (title means Poetry: A selection of the most beautiful poems of Persian literature), 2015
- Matamkadeye Oshagh (title means The Mourning-house of Lovers), 2017
- Ganjineye Chehrehaye Derakhshane Shero Adab Va Honare Esfahan Beh Enzemame Esfahan Dar Ayineye Zaman Az Gharne Panjom Ta Asre Hazer (title means The treasure of brilliant figures of Isfahan poetry, literature and art, including Isfahan in the mirror of time from the fifth century to the present), 2017
- Esfahan Dar Ayineye Zaman (title means Isfahan in the mirror of time), 2019

=== Articles ===
- Seyri Dar Nowrouz (title means A Cruise in Nowruz), 1987
- Bahse Tatbighi Piramoone Niayesh Dar Haft Khane Rostam (title means Comparative discussion about prayer in Rostam's Seven Labours), 1988
- Day Mah Va Adabiate Farsi (title means Dey (month) and Persian literature), 1989
- Hekayate Natamam (title means Unfinished story), 2005
- Danteh Va Tasir Pazirie Ou Az Manabe E Sharghi (title means Dante and his influence from Eastern sources), 2008
- Maghame Ensan Dar Adabiat Ba Negaresh Beh Qorane Majid (title means The position of man in literature with an attitude towards the Holy Quran), 2008
- In Farah Zakhm Ast Va An Gham Marham (title means This joy is a wound and that sorrow is an ointment), 2008
- Roudaki Va Chawsar (title means Rudaki and Chaucer), 2009
- Negahi Beh Ravanshenasie Chehreh Dar Daneshnameye Hakim Meisari; Kohantarin Sanade Pezeshkie Jahan (title means A look at facial psychology in Hakim Meysari encyclopedia; The oldest medical document in the world), 2009
- Kohantarin Sanade Pezeshki Dar Ravanshenasie Chehreh "Dar Shere Farsi" (title means The oldest medical document in facial psychology "in Persian poetry"), 2009
- Hafez Dar Gharb (title means Hafez in West), 2010
- Seire Tatavvore Vajeye Adab Ba Takid Bar Seh Gharne Avvale Hijri (title means The evolution of the word literature with emphasis on the first three centuries AH), 2010
- Tasir Pazirieh Adabiate Oroupa Va Amrica Az Hafez (title means Influence of European and American literature from Hafez), 2010
- Rikhtshenasie Gonbade Sorkh Dar Haft Peykare Nezamie Ganjavi (title means Morphology of the Red Dome in the Haft Peykar of Nizami Ganjavi), 2011
- Baztabe Jashne Mehregan Dar Ghasyede Shaerane Asre Ghaznavi -Bar Asase Dadehaye Amari- (title means Reflection of Mehregan Festivity in the poems of Ghaznavids poets -based on statistical data-), 2012
- Sedahaye Zaeef Faravanand (title means Weak sounds abound), 2013
- Shere Eteraz Dar Masire Nazariehaye Pasa Estemary (title means Poetry of protest in the path of postcolonial theories), 2014
- Romanticism, Realism Va Symbolism Dar Shere Manouchehr Atashi (title means Romanticism, Realism and Symbolism in Manouchehr Atashi's Poetry), 2014
- Barresie Karkarde Revayie Dow Hekayat Az Elahi Nameye Attar Bar Asase Nazariyeye Germes Va Genette (title means Investigating the validity of two anecdotes from Attar's divine letter based on Greimas and Genette theory), 2014
- Nokhostin Shaerane Tasirgozar Dar Gharb -Saadi, Khayyam, Ferdowsi- (title means The first influential poets in the West -Saadi, Khayyam, Ferdowsi-), 2014
- Tasir Pazirie Oroupa Az Andishehaye Nezami (title means European influence of Nizami's ideas), 2015
- Tasire Shahnameye Ferdowsi Dar Alman (title means The influence of Ferdowsi's Shahnameh in Germany), 2015
- Naghshe Shaeran Dar Bohrane Hoviate Melli (title means The role of poets in the crisis of national identity), 2015
- Doori Az Selseleye Tekrar Dar Khaneshe Matn/ Ketabe Sowti Ra Bayad Az Koodaki Amouzesh Dad/ Ketabe Gooya Bayad Ba Sedaye Yek Artist Bashad (title means Avoid repetition in reading text/ audiobook should be taught from childhood/ audiobook should be with the voice of an artist), 2015
- Tahlili Bar Nazariehaye Binamatnit Genti (title means An Analysis of Binamatnit Genti's Theories), 2016
- Aseman Show Abr Show Baran Bebar (title means Be the sky Be the cloud Make the rain), 2016
- Harfha Va Naghlha (title means Letters and quotes), 2016
- Ensan Mehvare Norouz (title means Human is center of Nowruz), 2016
- Shaeran; Setayeshgare Bahar (title means Poets; Spring Adorer), 2016
- Ketabshenasie Fergheye Ahle Hagh "Yarsan" (title means Bibliography of the Ahle Hagh "Yarsan" Sect), 2016
- Osturehaye Farhangsaz -Peyvande Ostureha Ba Shakhsiathaye Mazhabi Dar Shere Manghebat- (title means Culture-making myths (linking myths with religious figures in Manqabat poetry)), 2016
- Moarrefi Va Tahlile Noskhehaye Khattie Fergheye Ahle Hagh (title means Introduction and analysis of manuscripts of the Ahle Hagh "Yarsan" Sect), 2016
- Zendegie Akhlaghi Bar Asaseh Matne Ghabousnameh -Gharneh Panjome Hejri- (title means Moral life based on the text of Qabus-Nama -fifth century AH-), 2017
- Tasir Pazirieh Shamse Maghrebi Az Qorane Majid (title means Holy Quran Impact on Shams Maghribi), 2017
- Rikhtshenasie Propp Va Hekayate Elahi Nameye Attar (title means Propp's morphology and anecdotes of Attar's theology), 2018
- Revayatshenasie Hekayathaye Kelileh Va Demneh Dar Sathe Dastan Ba Tekyeh Bar Hekayate Padeshah Va Brahmanan (title means Narratology of Kalila and Demna stories at the level of the story based on the story of the king and Brahmans), 2018
- Tajallie Erfan Dar Andisheye Najmoddine Razi (title means Manifestation of mysticism in Najm al-Din Razi's thought), 2019
- Vijegihaye Sabkie Shere Arefaneye Shamse Maghrebi -Arefe Gharne Hashtom- (title means Stylistic features of Shams Maghribi mystical poetry -eighth century mystic-), 2019
- Karbaste Nazarieh Neshaneh Shenasie Michael Riffaterre Dar Tahlile Shere "Shabi Dar Harame Qods" E Rahi Mo'ayyeri (title means Application of Michael Riffaterre's semiotic theory in the analysis of the poem "A Night in the Holy Shrine" by Rahi Mo'ayyeri), 2019
- Revayat Shenasie Dastane Khajeh Neman Bar Asase Nazariyeye Todorof (title means Narratology of Khajeh Neman's story based on Todorov theory), 2019
- Ramzgoshyie Khanandeh Darune Matn, Dar Dastane Sheikhe SanAn (title means Decoding the reader in the text, in the story of Sheikh San'Aan), 2019
- Tahlile Onsore Darun Maye Dar Panj Asare Defae Moghaddas Ba Tekieh Bar Moalefehaye Paydari (title means Theme element analysis in five works of sacred defense based on the components of stability), 2020
- Tahlile Namayeshnameye Manfred Asare Lord Byron Bar Asase Tasir Paziri Az Adabiate Parsi Va Sharghi (title means Analysis of Lord Byron's play Manfred based on the influence of Persian and Oriental literature), 2020

== See also ==
- Manuchehr Anvar
- Tahereh Saffarzadeh
- Seyyed Mahdi Shojaee
- Ahad Gudarziani
- Masoumeh Abad
- Ahmad Dehqan
- Akbar Sahraee
