= Seyed Reza Bahaadini =

Iranian Shiite jurist and mystic (1908–1997)

- سید رضا بهاءالدینی
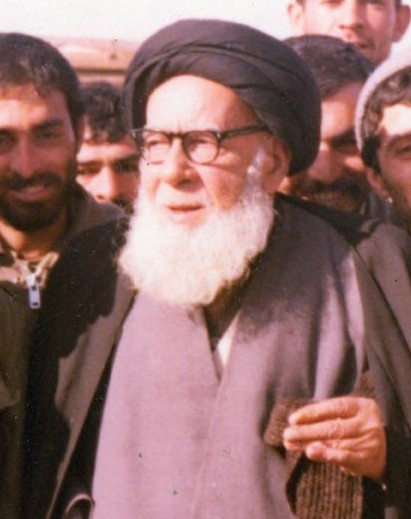

Personal life
- Born: 29 March 1908 Qom, Qajar Iran
- Died: 19 July 1997 (aged 89) Qom, Iran
- Resting place: Fatima Masumeh Shrine
- Parents: Seyed Safi al-Din (father); Fatemeh Soltan (mother)

Religious life
- Religion: Shia Islam
- Sect: Twelver Shi’ism
- Profession: Fiqh, Mysticism, Tafsir

Seyed Reza Bahaadini (29 March 1908 – 19 July 1997) was an Iranian Shia jurist, teacher of ethics and practical mysticism. He was one of the disciples of Abdul-Karim Haeri Yazdi, Seyyed Mohammad Hojjat Kooh Kamari, Seyyed Mohammad Taghi Khansari and Hossein Borujerdi. His greatest occupation and fame was his public or private debates on Islamic ethics courses, which lasted until the last days of his life.

== Birth and lineage ==
Seyed Reza Bahaadini was born on 29 March 1908 in Qom, Iran. His lineage goes back to Ali al-Sajjad (the fourth Imam in Shiʻi Islam). His father, Seyed Safi al-Din, was a pious man and one of the servants of the Fatima Masumeh Shrine, he had Islamic seminary education and was fluent in Quranic studies. His mother, Fatemeh Soltan, was from the descendant of the family of Mulla Sadra (Persian Twelver Shi'i Islamic mystic and philosopher).

== Education and career ==
From the age of two, he was sent to primary local school to learn the surahs of Quran. After learning to recite the Quran, he learned to read and write. At the age of six, he entered the Islamic Seminary of Qom, where he began to study religious sciences. He entered Feyziyeh School at the age of 12 after passing the entrance exam. Due to his rich and extraordinary intelligence, he was noticed by the professors from the very beginning and he started learning specialized topics under the supervision of professors such as Sheikh Abolghasem Qomi (died 1934) and Mohammad Taghi Bafghi (died 1946). He also passed the intermediate seminary courses with professors Mirza Mohammad Ali Adib Tehrani (died 1949), Mirza Mohammad Razini Hamedani (died 1999), Mullah Ali Masoumi Hamadani (died 1978) and Sadr al-Din al-Sadr (died 1953).

At the age of 19, he began the highest level of seminary courses such as Islamic jurisprudence and Principles of Islamic jurisprudence under Abdul-Karim Haeri Yazdi (died 1937), and after him, he benefited from the lessons of Seyyed Mohammad Hojjat Kooh Kamari (died 1953), Seyyed Mohammad Taghi Khansari (died 1952) and Hossein Borujerdi (died 1961). And since then, he first began to teaching general courses of literature, Islamic jurisprudence and principles for many years. After that, for nearly twenty years he has been teaching the highest level of seminary courses in the Islamic Seminary of Qom.

=== His disciples ===
Ayatollah Seyed Reza Bahaadini's greatest occupation throughout his life has been teaching Islamic seminary sciences. Many people have attended his lesson, some of whom are:

The intermediate seminary courses

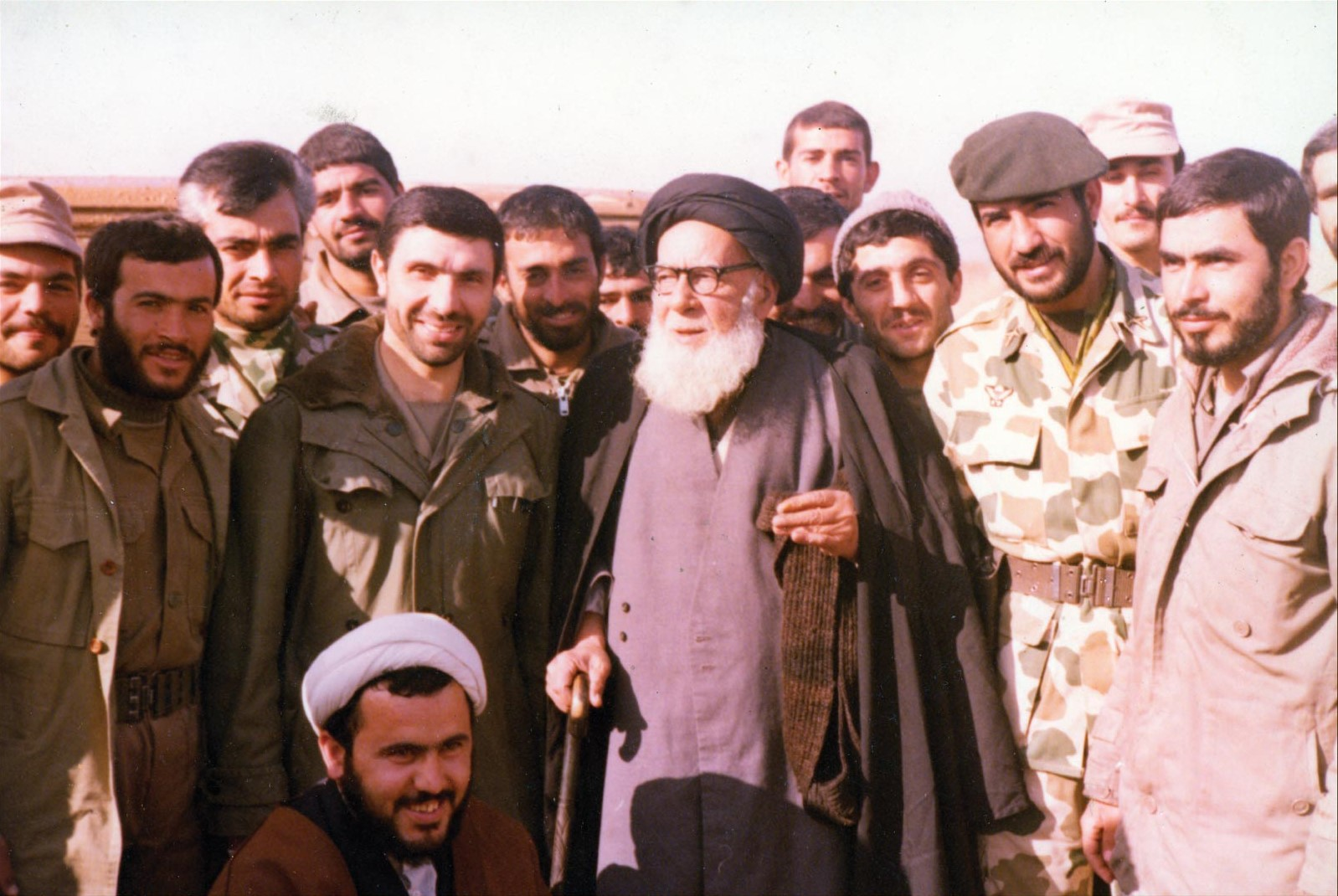
Seyed Reza Bahaadini and Ali Sayad Shirazi along with Iranian fighters on the Iran–Iraq War front.

- Morteza Motahhari
- Ali Meshkini
- Ahmad Azari Qomi
- Mohammad Fazel Lankarani
- Hussein-Ali Montazeri
- Mostafa Khomeini
- Seyyed Abdollah Fateminia
- Seyyed Abolfazl Ahmadi Khomeini Shahri
- Seyyed Mohammad Hossein Hosseini Tehrani

The highest level of seminary courses

- Mahdi Hadavi Tehrani
- Seyyed Mohammad Hashem Qazanfari Khansari
- Hossein Heydari Kashani
- Mohammad Hassan Ahmadi Faqih
- Mohammad Hossein Ahmadi Faqih Yazdi
- Mahmoud Amjad
- Ahmad Jannati
- Mohammad Hassan Moezzi
- Mohammad Momen
- Mohammad Nasiri

== Bibliography ==
The following manuscripts and treatises by Seyed Reza Bahaadini remain (all in Persian language, the titles have been translated into English for convenience):

- Statements of the course of Hajj Sheikh Abdul-Karim Haeri Yazdi on Fiqh and principles, especially the discussion of Zakat (Persian: تقريرات درس حاج شيخ عبدالكريم حائری يزدی در فقه و اصول، به ويژه بحث زكات)
- Statements of the course of Agha Zia ol Din Araghi on topics outside of Fiqh (Persian: تقريرات درس آقا ضياءالدين عراقی در مباحث خارج فقه)
- Statements of the course of Mirza Muhammad Hossein Naini outside of Fiqh and principles (Persian: تقريرات درس آيت‌الله ميرزا محمدحسين نايينی در خارج فقه و اصول)
- Statements of the course of Ayatollah Borujerdi on advanced jurisprudential issues (Persian: تقريرات درس آيت الله بروجردی در مباحث پيشرفته فقهی)
- Notes on some cases from the book Riyad al-Masa'il (Persian: حواشی بر مواردی از كتاب رياض المسائل)
- Statements of the course of Muhammad Hujjat Kuh-Kamari (Persian: تقريرات درس آيت الله سيد محمد حجت کوه‌کمری)
- Footnotes and comments on the book Al-Urwah al-Wuthqa by Mohammed Kazem Yazdi (Persian: حواشی و تعليقات بر كتاب عروة الوثقی از سيد محمدكاظم يزدی)
- Notes on Makasib by Sheikh Ansari (Persian: حواشی بر مكاسب شيخ انصاری)
- Comments and explanations on Kefayah al-osul by Akhund Khorasani (Persian: تعليقات و توضيحات بر كفايةالاصول آخوند خراسانی)
- An explanation of some phrases from Al-Sahifa al-Sajjadiyya (Persian: شرحی بر فرازهايی از دعاهای صحيفه سجاديه)
- Description of parts of Nahj al-Balagha, especially the first sermon and also the Imam's letter to Malik al-Ashtar (Persian: شرح بخش‌هايی از نهج‌البلاغه به ويژه خطبه اول و نيز نامه امام به مالك اشتر)
- Interpretive topics under the surahs of Asr, Inshirah, Nasr, Kawthar and a part of surahs Ankabut and Yusuf (Persian: مباحث تفسيری ذيل سوره‌های عصر، انشراح، نصر، كوثر و بخشی از سوره عنكبوت و يوسف)
- Description of the Supplication of Abu Hamza al-Thumali (Persian: شرح دعای ابوحمزه ثمالی)
- Studies in Arabic language and literature and a comparison between the order and prose of Jahiliyyah with the era of the advent of Islam (Persian: بررسی‌هايی در زبان و ادبيات عرب و مقايسه بين نظم و نثر جاهليت و عصر ظهور اسلام)
- Notes about Fiqh and its principles (Persian: يادداشت‌هايی در فقه و اصول)
- Reflection on the thoughts and ideas of the Wahhabi sect (Persian: تأملی در افكار و عقايد فرقه وهّابی)
- Collection of poems (Persian: مجموعه اشعار)

None of the scattered writings that Seyed Reza Bahaadini has written about Nahj al-Balagha, exegesis of the Quran and his notes on the jurisprudential interpretations of some of his masters have not been widely published. However, some of his ethics courses and some of his interviews have been published in two following books:

- Spiritual Conduct: Speeches, Interviews, and Memoirs of the Pious Faqih and the Wise Mystic Ayatollah Bahaadini (Persian: سلوک معنوی: گفتار‌ها، مصاحبه‌ها و خاطره‌هایی از فقیه وارسته و عارف فرزانه حضرت آیة الله بهاءالدینی), compiled by Akbar Asadi
- The Ladder to Sky: A Collection of Ethics Courses of the Pious Faqih and the Wise Mystic, excellency Ayatollah Bahaadini (Persian: نردبان آسمان: مجموعه‌ای از درس‌های اخلاق فقیه وارسته و عارف فرزانه، حضرت آیة‌الله بهاءالدینی), compiled by Akbar Asadi

== Marriage and children ==
Seyed Reza Bahaadini got married at the age of seventeen. He had two sons and eight daughters.

== Death ==
Seyed Reza Bahaadini died on 19 July 1997 in Qom and was buried in the Fatima Masumeh Shrine next to the grave of his teacher Abdul-Karim Haeri Yazdi. One day after the death of Seyed Reza Bahaadini, the supreme leader of Iran, Ali Khamenei issued a statement of public condolences in respect of him.

== See also ==
- Alireza Panahian
- Hossein Ansarian
- Seyyed Abdollah Fateminia
- Agha Hossein Khansari
- Mohammad Ibrahim Kalbasi
- Aqa Najafi Quchani
- Mirza-ye Qomi
- Seyed Esmaeil Mousavi Zanjani
- Ahmad ibn Ishaq Ash'ari Qomi
- Zakaria ibn Adam Ash'ari Qomi
