= Ahad Gudarziani =

Iranian writer (1969–2019)

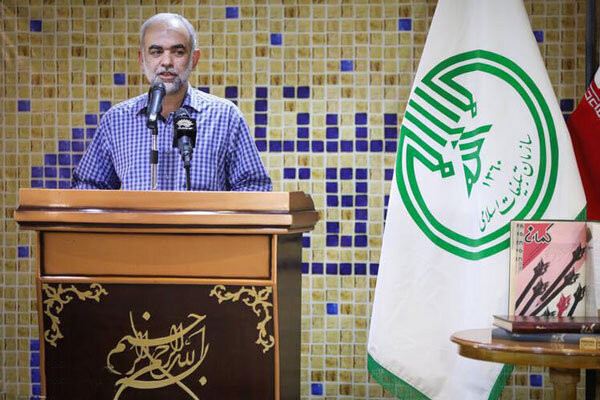
- Born: 1969; Tehran, Iran
- Died: December 20, 2019 (aged 49–50); Tehran, Iran
- Resting place: "Nam Avaran" section in Behesht-e Zahra; Segment 255, Number 43, Row 21
- Other name: Ahad Gudarziani
- Education: BA in Persian Language and Literature
- Occupations: Writer, researcher and journalist

Ahad Gudarziani or Ahad Gudarziani (Persian: احد گودرزیانی), was a writer, researcher and journalist who is known for his resistance literature works in Iran. He was honored at the Second and Third Celebration of Sacred Defense Journalists and Writers Conference for his works as Exemplary Writer and Reporter (February 2000 and April 2001).

== Life and career ==
Ahad Gudarziani, sometimes referred to as Ahmad Gudarziani, was born in Tehran on 1969. Since the age of nineteen he has worked as a writer and journalist with various newspapers and magazines.

He received a bachelor's degree in Persian language and literature and studied journalism at the Center for the Development of Media Education in Tehran, Iran. In 1993, he began his career as a researcher and writer in the Art Section of Islamic Development Organization. Since 1996 he has been managing the magazine "Kaman", a journal on the subject of sacred defense literature.

He also had a history of working with the Islamic Revolutionary Guard Corps publications.

Gudarziani set up the "Revolutionary and Sacred Defense Department" of Iran Book News Agency and was the secretary of the group until 2013.

He has been a referee at some literary and book festivals in Iran.

== Bibliography ==
- "Nimeye Penhane Yek Ostoureh", The Hidden Part of a Myth: A book about Mohammad Ebrahim Hemmat, based on a conversation with his wife Jila Badihian, published in Tenth Edition.
- "Rouz Shomare 15 Khordad", 15 Khordad Newsletter: A multi-volume book about 1963 demonstrations in Iran which has been collecting occurrences related to this event since 1961.
- "Baghe Angour, Baghe Sib, Baghe Ayeneh", Garden of Grape, Garden of Apple, Garden of Mirror: A book about Mehdi Bakeri, based on Morteza Sarhangi and Ahad Gudarziani conversations with his wife Safia Modarres and has been published in 11th edition.
- "Yek Nafar, Mesle Ou", Someone, like him: A book of quotation from Mehdi Forodi life, written in form of 15 letters based on his notes and his will.
- "Be Dade Ma Beresid!", Reach out to us!: A book about unspokens of historical letter from Ali Shamkhani, Commander of Khuzestan Corps. The letter is about protesting the lack of ammunition.

In addition to these, Gudarziani has edited numerous works, including the book "Pasiad: Pesare Khak (Pasiad: The Son of Soil)", a biography of Ali Akbar Aboutorabi Fard, and the books "Akharin Naghsh (The Last Role)", "Doud, Naboud Ast (The smoke, destroyed)", "Chehreye Khoobe Jahan (Good face of the world)", "Haj Agha Hossein Qomi".

== Death ==
He referred to hospital because of cardiac complications, but was discharged from hospital after being diagnosed. However, the next day December 20, 2019 he died at home. He died at age 50.

== See also ==
- Mehrdad Avesta
- Nasrollah Mardani
- Morteza Avini
- Tahereh Saffarzadeh
- Seyyed Mahdi Shojaee
- Islamic Development Organization
- Majid Gheisari
- Mohammad Doroudian
- Saeed Akef
- Hamid Reza Shekarsari
- Esmaeel Azar
