= Majid Gheisari =

Iranian writer and novelist

- مجید قیصری
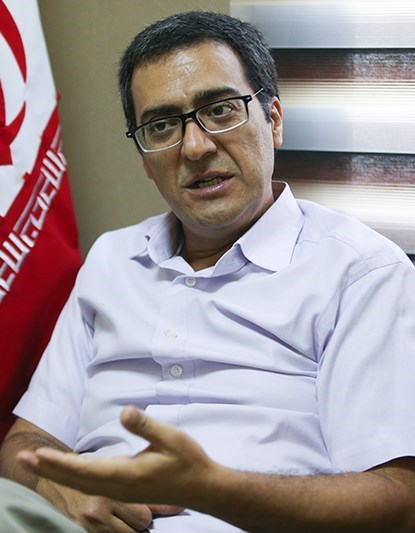
- Born: December 24, 1966 (age 59); Narmak, Tehran, Iran
- Education: Allameh Tabataba'i University (BA)
- Occupation: Writer
- Style: Novel, Children's literature, Juvenile literature, War

Majid Gheisari (Persian: مجید قیصری; born December 24, 1966, in Tehran) is an Iranian writer and novelist. He has won the International Eurasia Award from Russia for the premier novel in 2018.

Majid Gheisari has been a referee at various literary festivals in Iran.

== Life and education ==
Majid Gheisari was born in Narmak neighbourhood, Tehran, Iran. In 1984, He went to the Iran–Iraq War voluntarily when he was eighteen and remained in the front until the end of the war. In 1989, After the end of the war he continued his studies in psychology and finally in 1993, he received Bachelor's degree in this field from Allameh Tabataba'i University.

In 1993, he started writing in an instinctive and self-taught manner. Since 1995, he entered the field of literary fiction and created numerous works in the field of short and long fiction.

== Awards ==
=== International awards ===
- Winner of Eurasia Premier Novel of the Year in Russia for the book "Seh Kahen (Three Priests)"

=== Iran awards ===
- Worthy of praise for the "Negahbane Tariki (The Dark Guardian)" story collection in the eighth Jalal Al-e Ahmad Literary Awards
- Selected work of the sixth (2006) and the eighth (2008) Martyr Habib Ghanipour Year Book Award
- Selected work of Mehregan Literary Award in 2007
- Selected work of the sixth Isfahan Literary Award in 2008
- Best Book of the Year by the Iranian Pen Society for the book "Seh Dokhtare Golforoush (Three florist girls)" in 2006
- Golden Pen Award for the book "Seh Dokhtare Golforoush (Three florist girls)" in 2006
- The best short story of the year for the book "Goosaleye Sargardan (The Wandering Calf)" in 2006
- Twenty Years of Fiction Literature Award for the book "Goosaleye Sargardan (The Wandering Calf)"
- Isfahan Literary Award for the book "Seh Dokhtare Golforoush (Three florist girls)"
- PECA award for the book "Ziafat be Sarfe Golouleh (A banquet for the bullet)" in 2001
- Nominee in the novel section of the tenth Hooshang Golshiri Literary Awards for the book "Tanab Keshi (Drawstring)" in 2011

== Bibliography ==
- Goore Sefid, means The White Grave (2019)
- Jashne Hamegani, means Public celebration (2016)
- Negahbane Tariki, means The Dark Guardian (2014)
- Shamase Shami, means The Levant Shamas (2008)
- Seh Kahen, means Three Priests (2013)
- Seh Dokhtare Golforoush, means Three florist girls (2005)
- Baghe Telo, means The Stumble garden (2006)
- Ziafat be Sarfe Golouleh, means A banquet for the bullet (2000)
- Solh, means Peace (1995)
- Jangi Bood Jangi Nabood, means Once upon a war (1996)
- Taeme Barout, means Taste of gunpowder (1998)
- Nafare Sevvom az Samte Chap, means Third person from left (2000)
- Goosaleye Sargardan, means The Wandering Calf (2007)
- Mahe Zard, means The Moonstruck (2013)
- Mardi Fereshteh Peykar, means An Angel body man (2008)
- Zir Khaki, means Underground Hoard (2011)
- Digar Esmat ra Avaz Nakon, means Don't change your name anymore (2009)
- Tanab Keshi, means Drawstring (2011)

== Translated books ==
Some of the Majid Gheisari's books have also been translated into other languages:

- The Moonstruck, by Majid Gheisari, translated by Mehran Taghvaipour, in English, 2013
- Perceived Differently, translated by Mehran Taghvaipour, in English, 2013
- Ne change plus ton nom, by Majid Gheisari, translated by Roya Veyseh, in French, 2019

== See also ==
- Tahereh Saffarzadeh
- Ahad Gudarziani
- Masoumeh Abad
- Holy Defense Year Book Award
- Mohammad Doroudian
- Saeed Akef
- Hamid Reza Shekarsari
