= Hossein Elahi Ghomshei =

Iranian scholar (born 1940)

- Born: 5 January 1940 (age 86); Tehran, Iran
- Spouse: Parvin Zandi
- Family: Mahdi Elahi Ghomshei (father)

Education
- Education: Marvi 2 School
- Alma mater: University of Tehran

Philosophical work
- Era: 20th-century philosophy 21st-century philosophy
- Region: Islamic philosophy
- School: Theology; Mysticism; Philosophy of the fine arts
- Main interests: Persian literature; Islamic studies; Art
- Website: www.drelahighomshei.com

Hossein Mohyeddin Ghomshei (Persian: حسین محی‌الدین قمشه‌ای; born 4 January 1940) is an Iranian scholar, philosopher, author, and lecturer on literature, art, and mysticism.

== Life and education ==
Ghomshei was born on 4 January 1940 in Tehran, Iran. He is the son of Mahdi Elahi Ghomshei, the famous translator of Quran into Persian. He received his PhD in Islamic Theology and Philosophy from the University of Tehran. Mahdiye Elahi Ghomshei was his sister.

== Traditional education ==
- Arabic literature, grammar, logic, theosophy, jurisprudence, and Kalam: Tehran Seminary School
- Persian literature: especially Nezami, Rumi, Hafez, Saadi and Attar
- Islamic mysticism: especially Ibn-al-Arabi and Ibn-al-Farez
- Philosophy of the fine arts

== Academic work ==
=== Lectureship ===
Ghomshei was a lecturer at Tehran University and other universities and institutes (1968–2000) in the fields of:

- Philosophy
- Philosophy of the fine arts (aesthetics)
- Persian literature and mysticism
- Theology and Islamic mysticism
- English literature (emphasis on Shakespeare)
- Works of Rumi, Saadi, Hafez, Attar, Nezami, Ferdowsi, Shabestari.

=== Other academic works ===
Ghomshei has been:

- an international guest lecturer (partial list below)
- a domestic lecturer at various locations
- an author and translator (partial list below)
- the Director, National Library of Iran (1981-2)
- a culture and art adviser
- an editor

== International lecture sites (partial list) ==
- England
  - Victoria & Albert Museum, London
  - Dartington Hall, Devon
  - Cambridge University
  - Oxford University
  - Temenos Academy, London
  - University of Exeter
  - SOAS, University of London
  - Imperial College, University of London
  - University College of London
- Scotland
  - University of Glasgow
- United States of America
  - University of California, Berkeley
  - University of California, Los Angeles
  - University of Southern California (USC)
  - California State University, Long Beach
  - University of George Town
  - Harvard University
  - Princeton University
  - Stanford University
- Australia
  - University of Melbourne
  - Macquarie University, Sydney
  - Monash University
  - University of Queensland
- Canada
  - University of British Columbia
  - Simon Fraser University
  - University of Toronto
- Austria
  - Goethe Institute
  - Vienna University
- France
  - Versaille Palaces
- Germany
  - Frankfurt Book Fair

== Awards ==
- Most popular TV personality, highest ever rating at 86% (1998-9)

== Books ==
- Selection from the Discourses of Rumi (Fihe-ma-Fih). 1987. Elmi-Farhangi Publications Co.
- Selection from the Conference of Birds (Mantiq-al-Tayr) by Attar. 1994. Elmi-Farhangi Publications Co.
- Divan Hafez (A Critical edition of Hafez's Collected Poems). 2003. Peik-e-Oloum Publication.
- Essays on Persian Mystical Literature. Poetics and Aesthetics. 1999. Rowzaneh Publications Co.
- Kimia; Collected Essays, Translations and Introductions (Vol.1-5,8-12): 1998–2016. Rowzaneh Publications Co.
- Introduction to Golshan-e-Raz (Sheikh Mahmoud Shabestari). 1998. Elmi-Farhangi Publications Co.
- A Study of Islamic Texts in English Translation (University Textbook). 1992. SAMT Publication.
- Selection of Quotations and Poems by Shakespeare (translation). 2003. Elmi-Farhangi Publications Co.
- The Prophet (Translation from Gibran Khalil). 1999. Rowzaneh Publications Co.
- In the Realm of Saadi: A Collection of 365 Poems and Discourses from Saadi (Introduction and Commentaries). 2002. Sokhan Publishers.
- Omar Khayyam Robaiiats (Preface, editor). 2003. Peik-e-Oloum Publication.
- Selection From Shahnameh by Ferdowsi. 2006. Peik-e-Oloum Publication.
- Invocations of Komail (Translation from Emam Ali). 2006. Yassavoli Publications.
- Cultural Symposium. 2007. Peik-e-Oloum Publication.
- In the Realm of Gold: A Collection of 365 Poems and Passages from English Literature (Selection, Translation and Commentaries). 2007. Sokhan Publishers.
- In the Realm of Rumi: A Collection of 365 Poems and Discourses from Rumi (Introduction and Commentaries). 2009. Sokhan Publishers.
- The Other Wise Man (Translation from Henry van Dyke). 2007. Rowzaneh Publications Co.
- Subtleties of Mulla Nasreddin (Introduction and notes). 2010. Rowzaneh Publications Co.
- In the Realm of the Quran: A Collection of 365 Passages from Quran (Selection, Persian Translation, Commentaries and Introduction). 2011. Sokhan Publishers.
- A Treasury of the Familiar: 365 Days with the Persian Poetry, (Selection, Commentaries and Introduction). 2013. Sokhan Publishers.
- Rubaiyat of Omar Khayyam (Introduction and Commentaries on 40 Quatrains). 2015. Mirdashti Publication.
- Mystical Passages from Early Persian Prose and Poetry .2016. SAMT Publication.
- In the Realm of Hafez: A collection of 365 poems from Hafez (Introduction and Commentaries). 2017. Sokhan Publishers.
- The Laments of Baba Tahir: The Mystic Saint and Poet of Early Persian Literature (Persian Introduction and Edition). 2018. Gooya House of Culture and Art.
- The Grace of Quran: Album of Quranic Calligraphy, (Selection and Translation). 2018. Sabzeh Publishers.
- The Song of Lovers: A Selection of Elahi Ghomshei's Divan, ( Selection, Edition, and Introduction). 2018. Sokhan Publishers.
- The Divan of Hafiz (Persian Introduction and Edition). 2019. Gooya House of Culture and Art.

== Articles in English ==
- Hossein Elahi Ghomshei. Remembrance of the friend- Alast: man's divine covenant in Islam and Persian Literature.
- Hossein Elahi Ghomshei. The Principles of the Religion of Love in Classical Persian Poetry
- Hossein Elahi Ghomshei. The Symphony of Rumi. In the Philosophy of Ecstasy: Rumi and the Sufi Tradition. 2014.
- Hossein Elahi Ghomshei. Hafez & the Divine Covenant
- Hossein Elahi Ghomshei. Of Scent and Sweetness: Attar's Legacy in Rumi, Shabestari and Hafez
- Hossein Elahi Ghomshei. The Rose and the Nightingale: the Role of Poetry in Persian Culture
- Hossein Elahi Ghomshei. Poetics & Aesthetics in the Persian Sufi Literary Tradition
- Leonard Lewisohn. In the Company of the Quran by Muhyal-Din Ilahi Ghomshei.
- Hossein Elahi Ghomshei. Crossing the Bar: Leonard Lewisohn.

== Lecture topics in English (partial list) ==
- Seven Tales under Seven Domes; by Nezami
- Attar : Seven Stations of Love
- An Aesthetic Approach to the Philosophical Theory of Substantial Motion
- Problems of the Predestination and Free Will
- Saadi & Shakespeare (A comparative study)
- Rose & Nightingale; An Introduction to Persian Literature and Mysticism
- Music in Persian Poetry
- Rumi : The Art and Wisdom of Storytelling in Mathnavi
- Hafez and His Works
- Cultural Investment for the Younger Generation
- The World of Happiness and How to Attain it
- Poetics and Aesthetics in Persian Literature
- Adventures in Persian Mysticism
- Mathnavi : A Book for All Ages
- Nasir Khosrow's Poetry
- Mohyeddin Arabi and Ebn-e- Farez
- An Evening with Hafez
- Ethics of Science and Technology
- The Quran in Persian Literature
- The Wine of Alast: Divine Covenant of Man with God
- One and Many : The Circle of Being
- Global Ethics and the Human Nature
- Immortality of Soul
- Poetry and Prophecy
- Rumi: The Messenger of Love
- Islam and Human Nature
- Philosophical Doctrines and Spiritual Teachings of Rumi
- Alchemy of Love
- The Religion of Love in Classical Persian Poetry
- The Veils of God
- Total Integration of Man
- Perpetual Conflict between Man & Demon
- The Symphony of Rumi: A Thematic Approach to Rumi's Poetry
- A Philosophical and Aesthetic Approach to the Laws of Harmony
- The Wisdom of the Heart in Ibn Arabi and Persian Mystic Literature
- The True Essence of Islam
- Islamic Mystical Bacchanalia: The Wine-Ode of Ibn Farid of Egypt
- The Mythology of Norouz in Persian Literature
- Rumi and Tagore on Love
- Denizens of the Realm of Gold: A Sojourn among Some Immortal Mediaeval Persian Poets
- On Mahmud Shabistari
- On Rumi

== Lectures in Persian ==
Dr Elahi Ghomshei has delivered over 500 lectures in Persian in the past 40 years at different universities and cultural centers. Some lectures were broadcast on the Iranian TV Channel and they are also available in some social media websites. Elahi Ghomshei Culture and Art Institute has a complete collection of his lectures in their archive. Some of the lectures published on CDs are as follows**

- Excursions on Literature, Art, and Mysticism (72 lectures)
- In the Company of Hafiz (32 lectures)
- Divine Wine of Ibne Fariz of Egypt (5 lectures)
- Baghe-e-Del, on Shabestari's Golshane-Raz (24 lectures)
- The Epic of Man: On Nezami (10 lectures)
- The Evergreen Gardens of Saadi (10 lectures)
- A Roaming in the Sonnets of Shakespeare (5 lectures)

== Other activities ==
1. Chairman of the Board, Elahi Ghomshei Culture & Art Institute, Tehran
2. Member of the Board, Mawlana Jalaledin Rumi Culture, Art, Research Institute, Tehran
3. Chief Editor.Chaleepa Quarterly Magazine, Calligraphy &Traditional Arts, Tehran
4. Fellow of the Temenos Academy, London
5. Member of the Advisory Council, Mawlana Rumi Review, London

== See also ==
- Rumi
- Esmaeel Azar
- Intellectual movements in Iran
