= Masoumeh Abad =

Iranian politician

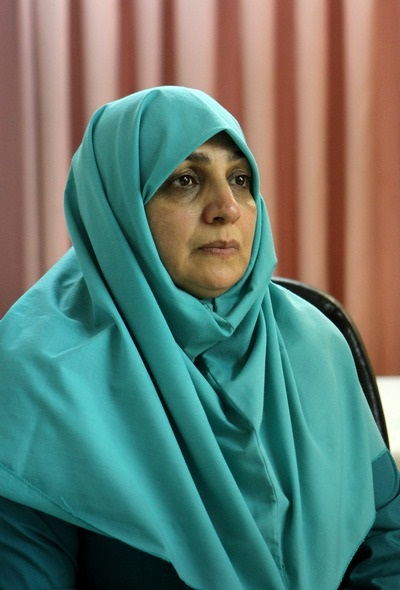
- Abad in 2013

Ambassador of Iran to Finland
- In office 2023–2024
- President: Ebrahim Raisi
- Preceded by: Frouzandeh Vadiati
- Succeeded by: Javad Aghazadeh Khoei

Member of the City Council of Tehran
- In office 29 April 2007 – 22 August 2017

Personal details
- Born: 1962 (age 63–64) Abadan, Iran
- Party: Society of Devotees of the Islamic Revolution
- Education: Iran University of Medical Sciences; Shahid Beheshti University

Masoumeh Abad (Persian: معصومه آباد; born 5 September 1962) is an Iranian author, university professor, and conservative politician. She was a member of the fourth Islamic City Council of Tehran and its Director of Health Division. Abad is also the author of the book I'm Alive. She was the Iranian Ambassador to Finland from 2023 to 2024.

== Captivity ==
During the Iran–Iraq War, Abad initially played a significant role in the construction and management of hospitals and other medical clinics for the Iranian Red Crescent Society (IRCS). Thirty-three days after the start of the war, however, when she was 17 years, old Abad, Fatemeh Nahidi, Maryam Bahrami and Halimeh Azmoudeh were captured by the Iraqi military forces on Mahshahr to Abadan's highway (15 October 1980). They were on Red Crescent mission. At first, Abad and her companions were sent to Tanoumeh border camp and then they were sent to Estekhbarat (secret agency of Saddam) and Al-Rashid prisons. Again after sometime, Abad and her companions were moved to Mosul and Al-Anbar camps. Three years and six months later, on 21 April 1983, Abad was released.

I'm Alive is a memoir by Abad detailing her experiences during the Iran–Iraq War. The book is Abad's captivity memoir in prison. This book received an award in the 16th Ketab-e-Sale-Defa-Moghadas of the year award in Iran. This book discusses some of the roles of Iranian women who participated in the war.

== Education ==
Abad holds a BSc degree in midwifery from Iran University of Medical Sciences in 1989, a MSc in Hygiene from Iran University of Medical Sciences in 1996 and PhD in Hygiene from Shahid Beheshti University in 2011.

== See also ==
- Majid Gheisari
- Tahereh Saffarzadeh
- Ahad Gudarziani
- Holy Defense Year Book Award
- Mohammad Doroudian
- Saeed Akef
- Hamid Reza Shekarsari
