= Ali-Akbar Raefipour =

Iranian social media personality

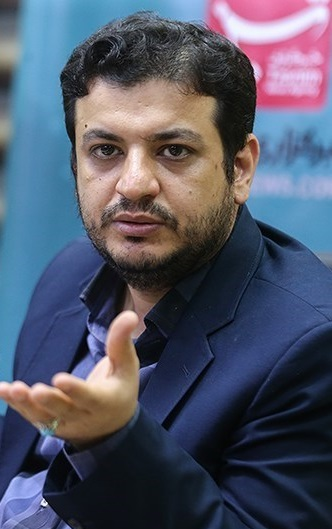
- Born: 1984 (age 41–42)
- Organization: Masaf Institute
- Movement: 3rd movement

Ali-Akbar Raefipour (Persian: علی‌اکبر رائفی‌پور, born 1984) is an Iranian commentator and social media personality. He is the founder and the head of Masaf Institute, an Iranian think tank with a fan base of youth supporters.

== Early life and career ==
Raefipour was born in 1984. He claims to be a "university lecturer and researcher in the apocalyptic topics and cults" and expresses extreme views on a wide range of topics including Satanism, freemasonry and Zionism. Raefipour is considered a conspiracy theorist, and described as antisemitic. His frequent preachings has attracted a cult following particularly among "young hardliners". According to Abuzar Royesh and Shelby Grossman of Stanford Internet Observatory, Iran experts describe Raefipour as "a propagandist with ties to extreme elements within the Iranian regime". News outlets controlled by the Islamic Revolutionary Guard Corps (IRGC) often praise Raefipour's public speeches.

Raefipour is the founder and head of Masaf Institute, launched in June 2011. The Institute is described as funded by and "affiliated" with the IRGC and a "government contractor". It works closely and has overlapping membership with the Basij Cyberspace Organization and Seraj Cyberspace Organization. The Institute is extensively active on social media; it uses accounts on platforms such as Twitter, Telegram and Instagram, and mobilises hundreds of accounts in coordinated propaganda campaigns using copypasta methods. It sponsors the annual state-backed International Holocaust Cartoon Competition.

In May 2020, Twitter suspended several of his accounts, although others in his name rapidly proliferated and grew large follower numbers. In 2022, Twitter suspended his account due to incitement of violence against participants in protests in the Mahsa Amini protests. In a tweet on December 6, he wrote, "If you want to lose your life, join the street protests, especially if you have a beautiful face". He said that calls for protests and strikes were part of an effort to "create deaths".

In the 2024 Iranian legislative election, working with Saeed Mohammad, the former head of the IRGC’s engineering arm, he formed an organisation, Morning of Iran, to back ultraconservative candidates, many of whom were successful.

== Views and reception ==
He is considered among the new generation of fundamentalist public speakers who, without an in-depth religious education, try to mix conspiracy theories with Shi'ite theological assertions in order to theorize the Iranian government and justify its policies. This new generation of fundamentalists which has emerged in the previous decade, and includes figures Hassan Abbasi and Hassan Rahimpour Azghadi, all described by the Financial Times as "younger ultraconservatives dubbed the 'super-revolutionaries'", is characterized as more aggressive and ambitious than the previous generation and more adopt to the global conspiracy theories.

He is an advocate of Mahdism, and his Institute has the stated goal of “acquainting Muslims with Mahdist topics and teachings.”

In 2011, Raefipour claimed that the word jeans comes from jinn. He also has stated that high-heeled shoes are designed to make female feet look like the hoofs of a jinn, and that T-shirts containing "spells or satanic slogans" are sold in the Iranian market. According to journalist Babak Dehghanpisheh, these remarks were in line with the Iranian government's dress code enforcement policy, at the time the Guidance Patrol had recently emerged.

In 2019, his Institute made a documentary promoting antisemitic conspiracy theories about the USS Liberty, which widely circulated on the internet in 2021, spread by Iranian accounts but aimed at US audiences.

He has applauded Chinese government and its election system, the latter because of depriving those who are not Communist Party members from voting. He has also stated that "Communist China's laws are exactly like laws of al-Moumenin".

As COVID-19 pandemic hit Iran in February 2020, he claimed that it was part of the U.S. hybrid war against China and Iran, and that the virus is an example of biological warfare. Afterwards, he called for enacting a law in the Iranian parliament that would allow retaliation against bio-terrorist attacks if they are proved to be used against Iran. He was also the main promoter of antisemitic memes about COVID under the hashtag #COVID1948, comparing Zionism to the virus.

In 2024, he vowed “revenge” on the “bastard Zionist regime” and posted antisemitic content on social media. He has decried Boris Johnson (who had one Jewish great-grandparent) as a Jew.

== Lawsuit ==
In 2020, Mohammad-Javad Azari Jahromi, Iran's Minister of Information and Communications Technology, sued him for jamming electronic GPS systems near an airport.

== Saudi Arabia ==
In July 2023, while visiting Saudi Arabia, he was banned from leaving the country and stayed in the Iranian consulate while the Iranian ministry of foreign affairs worked for his release. ‌He asked his supporters not to burn Saudi Arabian flags while he was there. He criticised the murder of Jamal Khashoggi. He accused the Saudi state of illegally trying to destroy House of Kaaba. He called The House of Saud "the new Saddam". He claimed that the 2015 Mina disaster was a deliberate act of killing of Shias. He's called Wahabism modern Jahiliyyah saying they have rabies He opposed the 2023 rapprochement between Iran and Saudi Arabia. He condemned Saudi mass execution in 2022, has claimed funding of Iran International comes through Saudi Neanderthals.He has blamed the assassination of Qasem Soleimani on the Saudi execution of Nimr al-Nimr.
