= Hossein Ansarian =

Iranian Shia Ayatollah (born 1944)

Sheikh Hossein Ansarian
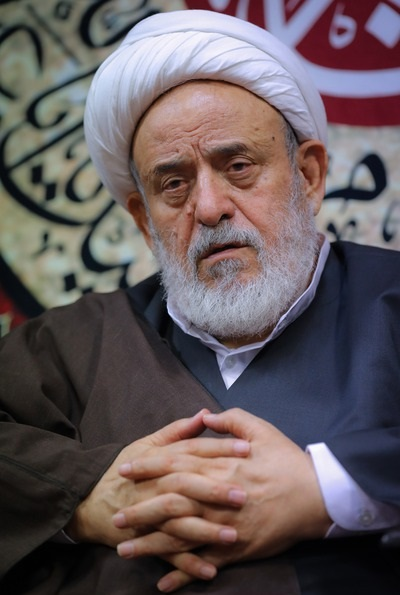
- Ansarian in 2019

Personal life
- Born: 9 November 1944 (age 81) Khvansar, Isfahan province, Iran school_tradition= Usuli Twelver Shia Islam
- Era: Modern history
- Main interest: Fiqh
- Relatives: Ali Ansarian (nephew)

Religious life
- Religion: Islam

Muslim leader
- Influenced by: Mirza Mahdi Elahi Qomshehei

Hossein Ansarian (Persian: حسین انصاریان; born 9 November 1944) is an Iranian Shia cleric.

== Early life ==
Hossein Ansarian was born on November 9, 1944 in Khansar, Isfahan province, Iran. His father, Muhammad Bagher, was from the Haj Sheikh dynasty, a famous and prestigious family in the Medina and Khvansar. His mother was from the Sayyid Mostafavi family and his nephew, Ali, was a professional footballer and actor who died in 2021, due to COVID-19 virus.

== Migration to Tehran ==
When Hossein was three years old, his family moved to Tehran. And while living in the Khorasan district, Ali Akbar Borhan, a Shia scholar, established the Borhan school in which Hossein attended. After completing high school in 1962, Hussein attended Qom Seminary and continued his higher education in Qom and Tehran Seminary.

== Teachers ==
He has had several teachers throughout his education, including:

- Ali-Akbar Borhan
- Sayyid Muhammad Taghi Ghazanfari Khvansari
- Seyyed Hossein Alavi Khansari
- Hajj Sayyid Muhammad-Ali ibn al-Ridha Khvansari
- Ali Falsafi
- Hajj Sheikh Abbas Tehrani
- Hajj Agha Hossein Fatemi
- Mohammad Fazel Lankarani
- Sayyid Muhammad Muhaqqiq Damad
- Mirza Hashem Amoli
- Hussein-Ali Montazeri
- Ali Meshkini
- Mohammad Yazdi

== Ansarian's translated books ==
Persian title	Translated title	Language(s)
Bā Kāravān-e Nūr	Accompanying the Caravan of Light	English
Nezām-e Khānevāde dar Eslām	The Family System in Islam/ The Islamic Family Structure	English, Urdu, Russian, Turkish, Arabic
Sharh-e Du'a Kumayl	Commentary on Kumayl Devotions	Arabic, Urdu, English
Tawbe, Āghūsh-e Rahmat	Repentance, the Bosom of Mercy	Arabic, English, Urdu
Dīyār-e 'Āsheqān (Sharh-e Sahīfa al-Sajjādīyya)	The Land of Lovers (Commentary on Al-Sahifa al-Sajjadiyya)	English
Ahl-e Bayt	The Prophet's (AS) Household, the Earth Inhabiting Divines	Urdu, Arabic, English, Russian
Luqman al-Hakeem	Luqman al-Hakeem	Urdu

== Books ==
- Translation of the Holy Qur'an.
- Translation of Nahj al-Balāgha.
- Translation of Sahīfat al-Kāmilat al-Sajjādīyya.
- Translation and paraphrase of Mafātīh al-Janān.
- Commentary on Kūmayl's Devotions. New edition.
- Ahl-e Bayt, 'Arshīyān-e Farshneshīn ("The Prophet's (AS) Household, the Earth Inhabiting Divines").
- Mu'āsherat ("sociability, association").
- Jelve-hā-ye Rahmat-e Elāhī ("Manifestations of Divine Blessings").
- Farhang-e Mehr-varzī ("The Culture of Love").
- 'Ebrat-Āmūz ("Admonitions").
- Zībā'ī-hā-ye Akhlāq ("The Beauties of Good Morals").
- Tawbe, Āghūsh-e Rahmat ("Repentance, the bosom of Mercy").
- Bar Bāl-e Andīshe ("On the Wings of Thought"), 2 vols., in print.
- Bā Kāravān-e Nūr ("Accompanying the Caravan of Light").
- Sīmā-ye Namāz ("The visage of Prayers").
- Luqmān-e Hakīm ("Luqman, the Sage").
- Furūghī az Tarbīyat-e Eslāmī ("Beams of Light from Islamic Education").
- Rasā'il-e Hajj ("Treatises on Pilgrimage to Mecca").
- Dīvān-e Ash'ār (Majmu'a-ye Ghazalīyyāt) ("Poetical Works, Collection of Ghazals).
- Pursesh-hā va Pāsukh-hā ("Questions and Answers"), 5 vols., in print.
- Nezām-e Khānevāde dar Eslām ("The Family System in Islam").
- Mūnes-e Jān ("The Beloved").
- 'Erfān-e Eslāmī (Sharh-e Misbāh al-Sharī'a) ("Islamic Mysticism, Commentary on M.), 15 vols, new edition.
- Dīyār-e 'Āsheqān (Sharh-e Sahīfa al-Sajjādīyya) ("The Land of Lovers, Commentary on S.), 15 vols, in print.
- Seyr-ī dar Ma'āref-e Eslāmī, ("Survey of Islamic Teachings"), vol.1, 'Aql, Kelīd-e Ganj-e Sa'ādat ("Intellect, the Key to the Treasure of Happiness"), vol.2, 'Aql, Mahram-e Rāz-e Malakūt ("Intellect, the Confidant of the Secret of the Heaven"), vol.3, Hadīth-e 'Aql va Nafs ("Discourse on Intellect and Soul").
- Majmū'a-ye Sukhanrānī-hā-ye Mawzū'ī ("Collection of Twenty Lectures Arranged by Topics").
- Eslām va Kār va Kūshesh ("Islam, Work, and Effort").
- Eslām va 'Elm va Dānesh ("Islam, Science, and Knowledge").
- Imām Hasan Ebn-e 'Alī rā Behtar Beshenāsīm ("Let Us Improve Our Knowledge Regarding Hasan b. 'Alī (AS).
- Ma'navīyyat, Asāsī-tarīn Nīyāz-e 'Asr-e Mā ("Spirituality, The Greatest Need of Our Time").
- Besū-ye Qūr'ān va Eslām ("Towards The Qur'an and Islam").
- Marz-e Rushanā'ī ("Border of Light", collection of poetry).
- Munājāt-e 'Ārefān ("Mystics' Devotions", collection of poetry).
- Chashme-sār-e 'Eshq ("Fountain of Love", collection of poetry).
- Golzār-e Muhabbat ("Garden of Love", collection of poetry).
- 'Ebrat-hā-ye Rūzgār ("Lessons of Time").
- Nasīm-e Rahmat ("Breeze of Mercy").
- Akhlāq-e Khūbān ("Moralia of the Good).
- Dar Bārgah-e Nūr ("At the Threshold of Light").
- Chehel Hadīth-e Hajj ("Forty Traditions Regarding Pilgrimage to Mecca").
- Hajj, Vādī-ye Amn ("Pilgrimage to Mecca, the Land of Security").
- Chehre-hā-ye Mahbūb va Manfūr-e Qur'ān ("Loveable and Disgusting Characters in the Qur'an").
- Adab vaĀdāb-e Zā'er ("Pilgrims' Rites").
- Rāhī be Sū-ye Akhlāq-e Eslāmī ("A Path towards Islamic Ethics").
- Velāyat va Rahbarī az Dīdgāh-e Nahj al-Balāgha ("Government and Leadership as Reflected in N.").
- Majmū'a-ye Maqālāt ("Collected Essays").
- 'Ubūdīyyat ("Submission").
- Shifā' dar Qūr'ān ("Cure in Islam").
- Nafts ("Soul").
- Taqrīrāt-e Dars-e Marhūm Āyatullāh al-'Uzmā Hājj Mīrzā Hāshem-e Amulī ("Annotations Taken at the Lectures delivered by the Late A., ms.).
- Taqrīrt-e Dars-e Khrej-e Marhūm Āyatullāh al-'Uzma Hājj Shaykh Abūlfazl-e Najafī-ye Khānsārī ("Annotations Taken at the Lectures Delivered by the Late A. for Students at the Inferential Level", ms.)

== See also ==
- Seyyed Abdollah Fateminia
- Alireza Panahian
- Hassan Rahimpour Azghadi
- Mohsin Qara'ati
