= Amir Mahmud Anvar =

Iranian academic and poet

Sayyid Amir Mahmud Anvar
- امیرمحمود انوار
- Born: November 15, 1945; Tehran
- Died: December 3, 2012 (aged 67); Tehran
- Resting place: Behesht-e Zahra, Tehran
- Occupations: academic; poet; writer
- Writing career
- Language: Persian and Arabic
- Genres: Religious literature and mysticism
- Website: drseyedamirmahmoudanvar.info

Sayyid Amir Mahmud Anvar (Arabic: أمير محمود أنوار, Persian: امیرمحمود انوار, romanized: Amīr Maḥmūd Anvār); 15 November 1945 – 3 December 2012) was an Iranian literary academic and poet. Born in Tehran into a notable Musawi family. From the late 1960s to 2010, he was one of the prominent professors of Tehran University in fields of Arabic and Persian literature, plus Islamic mysticism. Honored by number of first-class Iranian cultural awards, he dealt with Twelver Shia religious and Iranian national matters in his poetry and renowned as a bilingual poet in Persian and Arabic. Anvar died at the age of 67 in his birthplace and was buried in Behesht-e Zahra.

== Biography ==
Amir-Mahmoud Anwar was born to Mohammad Hossein Anwar and Ashraf al-Sadat Anwar on 15 November 1945 in Tehran. His lineage leads back to Ni'matullah al-Jazayiri and His family were Musawite in descent, interested in Persian and Arabic literature. His mother and father taught him first and he read and memorized the Quran and some Persian and Arabic classcical texts until ten years old. Then, during his early education, he apprenticed under various professors, such as: Abdullah Anwar, Mohiuddin Elahi Qomshaei, Morteza Gilani, Abdulhamid Badi Al-Zamani, Jafar Sajjadi, Sadegh Gowharin, Ali Naghi Monzavi, Afshar Shirazi, Badi' al-Zaman Forozanfar, Zabihollah Safa, Mohammad Moin, Abdul Hossein Zarinkoob, etc.

In 1966, he completed the bachelor's degree in Persian language and literature, and Arabic language and literature at the University of Tehran. In 1968, he succeeded in obtaining a master's degree in Arabic language and literature from the Faculty of Theology, Tehran University. Finally, in 1973, he received a doctorate degree in Quranic and Arabic sciences from Tehran University.

He was a teacher for many years. In 1966, he taught in high school for one year, from 1967 until the end of his life, he taught literature, Persian and Arabic hikmah and irfan in Iranian universities. From 1968 to 2010, he taught Persian literature and irfan at Tehran University for undergraduate, master's and doctoral degrees.

Mahmoud Anvar died on 3 December 2012 in Tehran, after two months of illness, and was buried in Behesht-e Zahra.

== Works ==
Anvar left behind several books. His collection of Persian and Arabic poems was published in 2017. He wrote a work on the history of Arabic literature from the pre-Islamic to the end of the Abbasid period. He has several works on the subject of comparative literature between Arabic and Persian. Anwar also compiled, corrected and wrote introductions for the poetry collections of Abu Ma'arif Zahid, Togra Yaghmai, Mohiiuddin Elahi Qeshmei and Abu al-Fath al-Busti.
