= Democrazy (disambiguation) =

Democrazy may refer to:

- Democrazy, a 2003 vinyl-only double EP of demos by Damon Albarn.

== See also ==
- Democracy or Demo Crazy, an Iranian political satire novel, originally published in 2009.
- Chinese Democrazy (You Snooze, You Lose), the original title of Splinter, the seventh studio album by American punk rock band the Offspring, released in 2003.
