= Seyyed Abdollah Fateminia =

Iranian Ayatollah (1946–2022)

- سید عبدالله فاطمی‌نیا
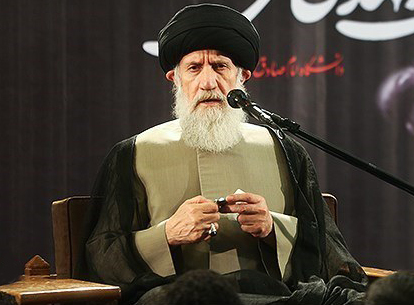
- Born: 1946; Tabriz, Iran
- Died: 16 May 2022 (aged 75–76)
- Occupations: Mujtahid; Faqīh; Biographical evaluation expert; Orator; Mystic; Professor of Islamic ethics; Islamic historian; Bibliographer; Expert of hadith and Arabic poetry.
- Known for: Farhange Entezaar; Sharh va Tafsire Ziyarat Jami'ah Kabirah; Nokteh ha az Gofteh ha
- Children: 2

Seyyed Abdollah Fateminia (Persian: سید عبدالله فاطمی‌نیا; 1946 – 16 May 2022) was an Iranian Shiite cleric, professor of Islamic ethics, orator, Islamic historian and bibliographer. He researched Arabic poetry, hadith, ethics and mysticism. His religious sermons were often broadcast on Iranian television, so he was a well-known religious figure in Iran.

== Life and education ==
Seyyed Abdollah Fateminia was born in 1946 in Tabriz, Iran. As a child, he learned religious and scientific lessons from his father, Ayatollah Seyyed Ismail Shendabadi. Then, for about 30 years, he studied under Allameh Mostafavi, one of Ali Qazi Tabatabai's students, and was educated by him. At the same time, he pursued his Islamic seminary education. After Allameh Mostafavi, he studied under Islamic scholars such as Allameh Tabatabai, Seyyed Mohammad Hassan Elahi Tabatabai (younger brother of Allameh Tabatabai), Muhammad Taqi Amoli, Seyed Reza Bahaadini, Mohammad-Taqi Bahjat Foumani, Mohammad-Taqi Ja'fari, and…. Most of his masters were students of Ali Qazi Tabatabai in Islamic sciences and mysticism. Hence, Fateminia was one of the students of Ali Qazi Tabatabai through an intermediary.

== Career ==
Seyyed Abdollah Fateminia was one of the experts in Islamic sciences who was also engaged in research in this field; His other activities included teaching in the Islamic seminaries, attending religious programs on Iran's radio and television as an expert, and lecturing in seminaries and universities. Fateminia had a wide knowledge about the science of rijal and theoretical mysticism, but he was mostly engaged in sermons in public forums. He was considered one of the famous commentators of Al-Sahifa al-Sajjadiyya and Nahj al-Balagha and gave many lectures in these cases.

== Bibliography ==
Fateminia's books are in Persian and in the field of Islamic awareness and Shiite concepts:

- Nokteh ha az Gofteh ha (Persian: نکته‌ها از گفته‌ها, English meaning: Tips from sayings): Excerpts from the lectures of Master Fateminia, compiled by Habib Kazemi, three-volume, 2006.
- Farhange Entezaar (Persian: فرهنگ انتظار, English meaning: The culture of waiting): About occultation of Mahdi and other Islamic issues, 1996.
- Farjaame Eshq (Persian: فرجام عشق, English meaning: The fate of love): A commentary on the sonnet of Imam Khomeini, Persian & Urdu, 1990.
- Yek Nokteh az Hezaran (Persian: یک نکته از هزاران, English meaning: A tip from the thousands): Republishing the speeches of Master Fateminia, two-volume: first volume republishing of Farhange Entezaar and second volume republishing of Farjaame Eshq, 2006.
- Armaqaane Ghadir (Persian: ارمغان غدیر, English meaning: The gift of Ghadir): Forty hadiths from Shiite and Sunni sources about Ghadir, 1993.
- Sharh va Tafsire Ziyarat Jami'ah Kabirah (Persian: شرح و تفسیر زیارت جامعه کبیره, English meaning: Description and interpretation of the Ziyarat Jami'ah Kabirah): The text of the ten lectures of Master Fateminia on the description and interpretation of the Ziyarat Jami'ah Kabirah, compiled by Mohammad Rahmati Shahreza, 2004.
- Rowzehaye Ostaad Fateminia (Persian: روضه‌های استاد فاطمی‌نیا, English meaning: The anthems of Master Fateminia): The texts of Rawda Khwani lectures of Master Fateminia, compiled by Mohammad Rahmati Shahreza, 2005.
- Naghmeh Asheqi (Persian: نغمه عاشقی, English meaning: The loving anthem): The texts of Rawda Khwani lectures of Master Fateminia, compiled by Mohammad Rahmati Shahreza, 2005.

His articles have also been published in various journals of Iran.

== See also ==
- Alireza Panahian
- Hossein Ansarian
- Mohammad-Taqi Bahjat Foumani
- Agha Hossein Khansari
- Mohammad Ibrahim Kalbasi
- Aqa Najafi Quchani
- Mirza-ye Qomi
- Zakaria ibn Idris Ash'ari Qomi
- Seyyed Mohammad Hojjat Kooh Kamari
- Ahmad ibn Ishaq Ash'ari Qomi
- Zakaria ibn Adam Ash'ari Qomi
