= Mahdiye Elahi Ghomshei =

Iranian poet and literary (1937–2016)

- Born: 28 May 1937; Tehran
- Died: 9 July 2016 (aged 79); Tehran
- Burial place: Lavasan
- Occupations: poet, scholar
- Father: Mahdi Elahi Ghomshei
- Relatives: Hossein Elahi Ghomshei (brother)

Mahdiye Elahi Ghomshei (Persian: مهدیه الهی قمشه‌ای; 28 May 1937 – 9 July 2016) was a Iranian poet, scholar of Rumi, and researcher of mystical literature.

== Biography ==
She was the eldest daughter of Mehdi Elahi Ghomshei and the sister of Hossein Elahi Ghomshei.

From childhood, she developed an interest in poetry and literature under the guidance of her father. In addition to him, her mentors included Jalal Homaei, Shahabi, Sadr al-Din Mahallati, and Mohammad-Taqi Ja'fari.

She dedicated her life to researching Rumi’s Masnavi.

Mahdieh Elahi Ghomshei died on 9 July 2016, at the age of 79. Her funeral ceremony was held on 11 July 2016, in front of Vahdat Hall, and she was ultimately laid to rest in Lavasan.

== Works ==
- Spring of Love (Bahar-e Eshgh): Selected Poems; Publisher: Khat-e Zarrin (2008)
- Temple of Love (Ma'bad-e Eshgh): Collected Poems; Author: Mahdieh Elahi Ghomshei; Publishers: Elm (2003), Ettela'at (2017)
- Karbala: Valley of Love (Karbala Vadi-ye Eshgh): Original verses by Mehdi Elahi Ghomshei, adapted/retold by Mahdieh Elahi Ghomshei; Publisher: Faran (2009)
- Biography, Memoirs, and Summary of the Collected Poems of Hakim Mehdi Elahi Ghomshei*; Publisher: Ettela'at
- Minstrel of Love (Motreb-e Eshgh): Selected Poems; Publisher: Khat-e Sevvom (2014)
- A Journey Through the Rose Garden of the Masnavi (Seiri dar Golzar-e Masnavi): Commentary on the tales of the Masnavi-ye Ma'navi; Publisher: Astan Quds Razavi (2015)
