= Mosaic defence strategy =

Iranian military doctrine

The mosaic defence strategy or decentralized mosaic defence is a military doctrine developed by the Islamic Revolutionary Guard Corps which incorporates a flexible and decentralized command structure with built-in redundancies. It was originally developed in 2005 to combat a foreign-backed regime change and came to prominence during the 2026 Iran war.

== History ==
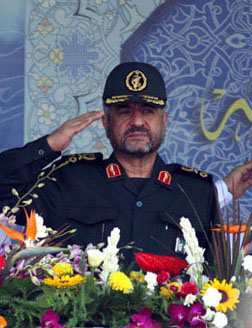
Mohammad Jafari in 2011

The mosaic defence was developed in 2005 by the IRGC's Center for Strategy, then led by Mohammad Ali Jafari, and influenced by the thinking of Hassan Abbasi, as part of Iran's land warfare doctrine to confront the threats of a United States military attack or a coup supported by a foreign power.

The IRGC was prompted to develop the strategy after witnessing the ineffectiveness of the Iraqi army during the Iraq War, when a high degree of centralization prevented units from carrying out even basic manoeuvres without approval from the leadership after the leadership was targeted and communication was disrupted.

== Description ==
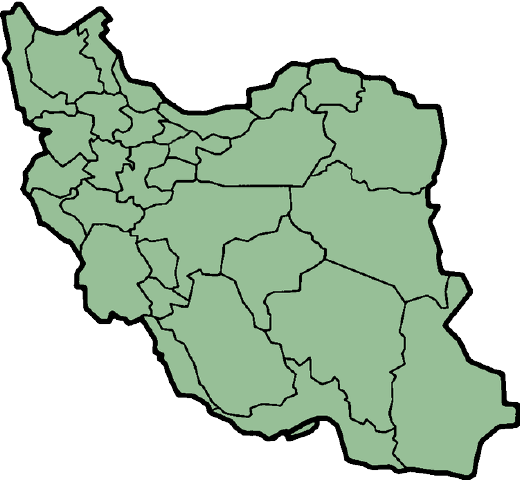
The 31 provinces of Iran

As part of the mosaic defence strategy each of Iran's 31 provinces is given its own provincial command structure with its own independent resources. This gives the local commanders freedom to act independently in the pursuit of a pre-defined strategy and objectives, similar to German Auftragstaktik doctrine.

Iran's large size and mountainous geography would leave the supply lines of an invading force vulnerable to attack and would allow local units to mount an asymmetric war of attrition against the invading force by creating stay behind cells of IRGC members and Basij personnel, under the assumption that an invading force would have superior conventional military power and military intelligence capabilities.

This decentralization also reduces the effectiveness of decapitation strikes as tracking and neutralizing members of the central leadership would not impact the operation of these local units, and the need to track local and lower level leaders would put a larger strain on opposition intelligence services.

The strategy also acts as a deterrent against invasion as the implication is that all the provincial commands would need to be defeated, prolonging the war and making the fighting more unpredictable as different commanders and units will react differently, with Ali Larijani stating during the 2026 Iran war that Iran has prepared itself for a long war.

== 2026 Iran war ==
The strategy, combined with its Fourth Successor leadership model (a system to ensure that for each key leadership position there are multiple named successors to fill the role of senior figures should they be killed in the conflict with Reza Talaei-Nik confirming that each figure in the command structure has named successors three ranks down) has been central to Iran's actions during the 2026 Iran war, with Abbas Araghchi claiming on March 1, 2026 that the mosaic defence incorporated lessons learned from two decades of US interventions and would allow Iran to choose when the war will end.

The use of the mosaic defence strategy became apparent from the first Iranian strikes of the conflict; with strikes against Oman being attributed by Araghchi to a mistake by autonomous units who could not be contacted. Experts such as Hamidreza Azizi have warned that the decentralized nature of the conflict increases the risk of such errors, triggering escalations.

Expert on Iranian armed forces at the Center for Naval Analyses Michael Connell has stated that while it appears that Iran has been delegating command to lower levels allowing them to fire a small number of strikes, their capabilities have clearly been degraded significantly, and that while the low level commanders are able to operate independently, a lack of central organisation is not ideal and the different groups operate in a disjointed fashion. Heather Williams, former deputy national intelligence officer for Iran at the National Intelligence Council, has said that the mosaic defence appears to be helping weather the decapitation strikes against military leadership and allowing Iran to launch retaliatory strikes.
