= Center for Borderless Security Doctrinal Analysis =

Iranian think tank

Coordinates: 35°42′05.5″N 51°29′48.7″E

Andishkadeh Yaghin
- Abbreviation: DACSB
- Formation: 2000
- Type: Think tank
- Headquarters: Lozi Sq., Tehranno
- Location: Tehran, Iran
- President: Hassan Abbasi
- Website: Official website

Andishkadeh Yaghin (Persian: اندیشکده یقین, romanized: Andishkadeh-ye Yaghin, lit. 'Certainty Think tank') with former name of Doctrinal Analysis Center for Security without Borders (Persian: مرکز بررسی‌های دکترینال امنیت بدون مرز) also Known as Center for Doctrinal Strategic Studies is an Iranian Nonprofit non-governmental organization allegedly Revolutionary Guards-affiliated Think tank directed by Hassan Abbasi.

The strategy of serve strategic assets in either deterring or striking at the West and also to derail domestic attempts to dilute the Islamic Republic’s revolutionary legacy is apparent in the work of the Think tank. Its mission is to develop the Islamic Republic's Doctrine for countering internal and foreign threats in the coming Century.

According to a faculty of the Think tank, Andishkadeh use Modern Structure models of TRADOC and Collège de France, and also Traditional model of Safavid Era's Hawza.

== Sources ==
Articles

- Valizadeh, Reza (27 May 2010). "Coup-d'État? The Iranian Election in Five Acts". PBS. Tehran Bureau.

Books

- Seliktar, Ofira (2012). Navigating Iran: From Carter to Obama (1st ed.). Basingstoke: Palgrave Macmillan. ISBN 1137010886.
- Richet, Jean-Loup (2015). Cybersecurity Policies and Strategies for Cyberwarfare Prevention. Hershey, PA: IGI Global. ISBN 978-1-4666-8456-0.
- Badey, Thomas J. (2009). Violence and terrorism, 08/09 (11th ed.). Dubuque, IA: McGraw-Hill Contemporary Learning Series. ISBN 0073397768.

Papers

- Alfoneh, Ali (Winter 2007). Karsh, Efraim (ed.). "Iran's Suicide Brigades". Middle East Quarterly. 14 (1). Middle East Forum. ISSN 1073-9467.
