= Hassan Abbasi =

Iranian conspiracy theorist

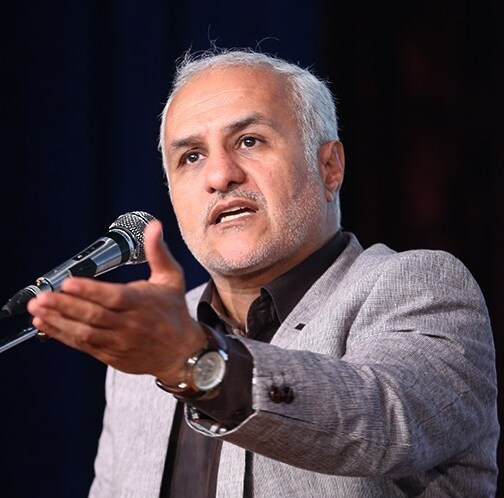
- Abbasi in 2019
- Born: c. 1966 (age 59–60); Azna, Iran
- Military career
- Allegiance: Iran
- Branch: Islamic Revolutionary Guard Corps
- Website: https://dr-abbasi.ir

Hassan Abbasi (Persian: حسن عباسی) is an Iranian theorist and an Islamic Revolutionary Guard Corps officer who heads its think-tank 'Center for Borderless Security Doctrinal Analysis'. Abbasi is primarily known for his theories, and for delivering controversial speeches on issues including economics, history, politics and cinema.

He was a jury member in 2011 edition of Fajr International Film Festival and a lecturer in the 2013 International Conference on Hollywoodism.

== Views and alleged works ==
U.S. Army Colonel Sean J. Corrigan, in a 2011 research project entitled "Exploitable Vulnerabilities of Iran's Islamic Revolutionary Guard Corps", names Abbasi as one of the two "key architects of Iran's doctrine of asymmetric warfare" and mosaic defence strategy, along with Major General Mohammad Ali Jafari. Jahangir Arasli, an Azerbaijani intelligence analyst, wrote in 2007 that Abbasi was among those in charge of devising the concept of asymmetric response at Imam Hussein University.

Abbasi has distorted the biblical story of Esther to claim that Jews had massacred over 70,000 Persians, an event he labeled the "Iranian Holocaust". Historian Meir Litvak states that Abbasi holds anachronistic views and is among contemporary proponents of antisemitic conspiracy theories in Iran.

After Clifford May, Amir Taheri has dubbed him "the Kissinger of Islam" in a The Telegraph article, and also quoted an anonymous European diplomat in Tehran saying "to Iran's new ruling elite, Abbasi is the big strategic brain". In 2004, Michael Ledeen claimed that he serves as "theoretician" in the office of Supreme Leader of Iran with a special responsibility for North American affairs. In a paper presented by Shmuel Bar, Rachel Machtiger and Shmuel Bachar at the Herzliya Conference in 2008, Abbasi is deemed as one of the IRGC prominent figures who "is said to be affiliated with Mesbah Yazdi... a supporter of the Hojjatiyeh and of Ahmadinejad... one of the main contributors to Ahmadinejad's strategic thought".

Raz Zimmt classifies him among the prominent figures of the radical right wing of Iranian politics, along with Mehdi Ta'eb, Alireza Panahian, Said Qasemi and Qasem Ravanbakhsh who all serve in the central committee of 'Ammar Headquarters', an IRGC-affiliated institution established in 2011. According to a 2012 report edited by Raz Zimmt, Abbasi is "one of the major theoreticians of the radical wing in the conservative camp and the Revolutionary Guards". In 2014, a security research of Hewlett-Packard claimed that the «Basij Cyber Council» operates under the direction of Abbasi. In February 2019, he gave a speech condemning President Hassan Rouhani, Speaker Ali Larijani, and Foreign Minister Mohammad Javad Zarif for having supported the Joint Comprehensive Plan of Action telling them to "go to hell" and that the Iranian people would "spit" on them, seen as expressing the IRGC's growing resentment over the nuclear deal and its fallout. Shortly thereafter, Javad Zarif tendered his resignation, although Rouhani did not accept it.

== See also ==
• Ali Akbar Raefipour

• Alireza Panahian
