= Seraj Cyberspace Organization =

- Founded: 2013; 13 years ago
- Headquarters: {{{location_country}}}
- Key people: Mansour Amiri (head)
- Website: seraj.ir

Seraj Cyberspace Organization (Persian: سازمان فضای مجازی سراج) is a Islamic Revolutionary Guard Corps (IRGC)-affiliated organization used for conducting information warfare and online influence operations.

== History ==
Seraj Cyberspace Organization was founded in 2013. It is an affiliate of the IRGC, specifically under its Baqiatallah Headquarters, and operates in coordination with the Basij militia. Its website was launched in 2016. As of 2018, the organization's head was Mansour Amini.

In January 2026, it was sanctioned by the European Union alongside other Iranian entities involved in internet censorship and surveillance.

== Activities ==
Seraj Cyberspace Organization operates as a central organization for recruiting, training and mobilizing internet users to conduct online operations supporting the IRGC and Iranian government, including trolling and disinformation campaigns. In one example, during the 2022 Mahsa Amini protests, Seraj disrupted the hashtag #MahsaAmini by propagating similar hashtags with minor incorrect spellings. Most Seraj accounts on social media use fake profiles. Seraj also creates online content including films, mobile apps and video games to promote IRGC-aligned ideology.

The organization has described its main mission as realizing the objectives of the Iranian Revolution by harnessing the capacity of spontaneous popular groups. In 2021, its public relations manager stated the scope of its activities "has been shaped by the Supreme Leader's special concern about cyberspace". Seraj Cyberspace Organization's website allows activists to interact and share content, and contains research materials and multimedia produced by the organization.

=== Subunits ===
Seraj Cyberspace Organization has multiple subunits, covering areas such as training, research, game and software production, social media and visual media. It has a Women's Center section aimed specifically at women. Seraj branches exist in all Iranian provinces.
