= Encyclopædia Meysari =

Medical encyclopedia

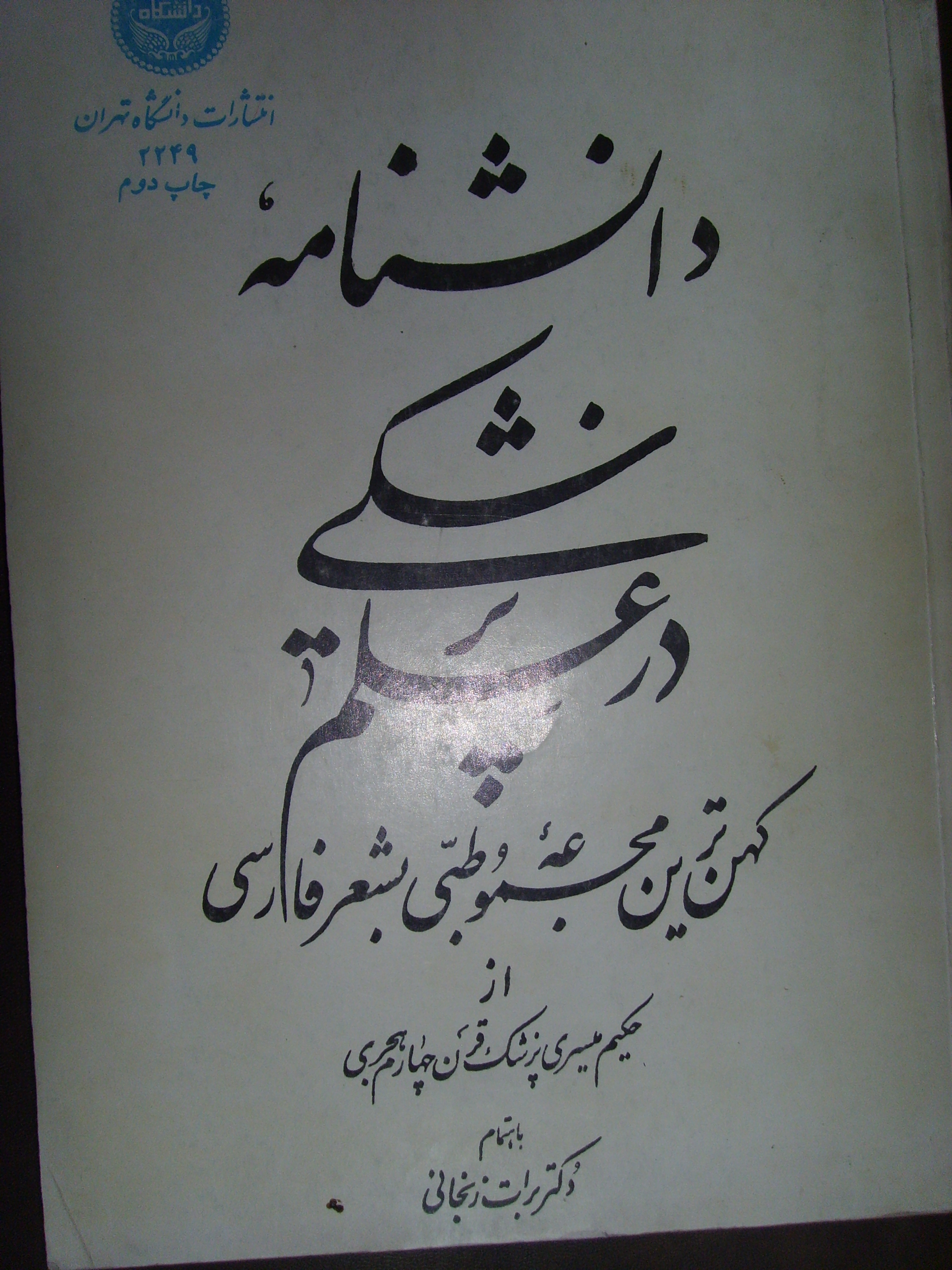
A book about the medicine of the ancestors of Iran in the form of poetry. Composed by Hakim Meysari.

The Encyclopædia Meysari (Persian: دانش‌نامه میسری) is a Persian medical encyclopaedia written by the Persian Meysari between AD 977 (367 AH) and AD 980 (370 AH). A manuscript with number R-7799-310 is in Bibliothèque nationale de France.

== Name ==
Meysari named his work Dānešnāma, in Persian means Encyclopedia (book[nāma] of knowledge[dāneš]), once in the beginning of his book and then at the end of it. The only existing manuscript of the work kept in the National Library of France has 164 folios and consists of 4481 lines. It was copied by Mahmud Tabrizi who was Shahnameh-khani (the reciter of Shahnameh) in AD 1448 (852 AH).
