= Nasrollah Mardani =

Iranian poet

- نصرالله مردانی
- Born: January 14, 1948; Kazerun, Iran
- Died: March 9, 2004 (aged 56); Karbala, Iraq
- Resting place: Mardani Park, Kazerun
- Occupation: Poet

Nasrollah Mardani (Persian: نصرالله مردانی) (1948 - 2004), was a prominent Iranian poet. He was one of the influential poets in the years after the iranian revolution and one of the Ever-lasting Names of Iran in the field of literature and culture. Mardani, under the influence of the new Ghazals of her fellow citizen poet, Mohsen Pezeshkian, turned to this style. He is mentioned as the inventor of the epic lyric style. The book Khoonnameh Khak from Mardani's books was selected as the selected book of the year in Iran in 1985. Mardani can be considered one of the most prominent poets after the revolution in Iran. His tomb is located in Mardani Park complex in Kazerun city.

== Life ==
Nasrollah Mardani was born on the 14th of January 1948 in Kazerun city in Iran and finished his education in the same city. Mardani was fascinated by the poems of Hafez and Ferdowsi. However, he was strongly influenced by the poems of his fellow citizen, Mohsen Pezeshkian, and for this reason, he turned to the lyrical style. Before the revolution, Mardani was an employee of the Bank Melli Iran and after the revolution he worked in the cultural departments of the Islamic Revolutionary Guard Corps and the Ministry of Culture and Islamic Guidance. His interest in Muhammad Husayn Tabataba'i led to the National Congress for 9 years under the title Commemorate Allameh Tabatabai in Kazerun.

== Poetic style ==
Mardani's poems were more epic and revolutionary. His poetic style attracted many government poets, so that the footprints of his compositions and images can be traced in the Ghazals of other poets of the Islamic Revolution. Considering his past interest in Ferdowsi and Hafez, inspired by these two, he created a link between epic and ghazal. He was loyal to the classical and ancient forms of Persian poetry, in his poems dealt with themes related to the Iran-Iraq war. Mardani also wrote many poems in Kazeruni accent due to his love for his hometown.

== Books ==
Mardani wrote 12 books during his life. Fire of Ney, Uprising of Light, Rule of Love, Fourteen Everlasting Lights, and Crest of Speech are among his published books. His book Khoonnameh Khak was selected Iran’s best book of 1985.

== Death ==
Nasrollah Mardani died on March 9, 2002 during a trip to Iraq in the city of Karbala. His body was first moved to Tehran and was funeral in front of the Vahdat Hall in the presence of officials and then, according to his will, he was transferred to his hometown Kazerun and buried in this city. Ali Khamenei in a message called him a sweet-spoken and revolutionary poet. Some of the country's senior officials also expressed their condolences on his death.

== Tomb ==
After Mardani's death, Kazerun municipality decided to build a monument to Mardani's grave and build a garden in his name. This garden with an area of 12 hectares was established in the southwest of Kazerun and the tomb of Nasrollah Mardani is located in this garden.

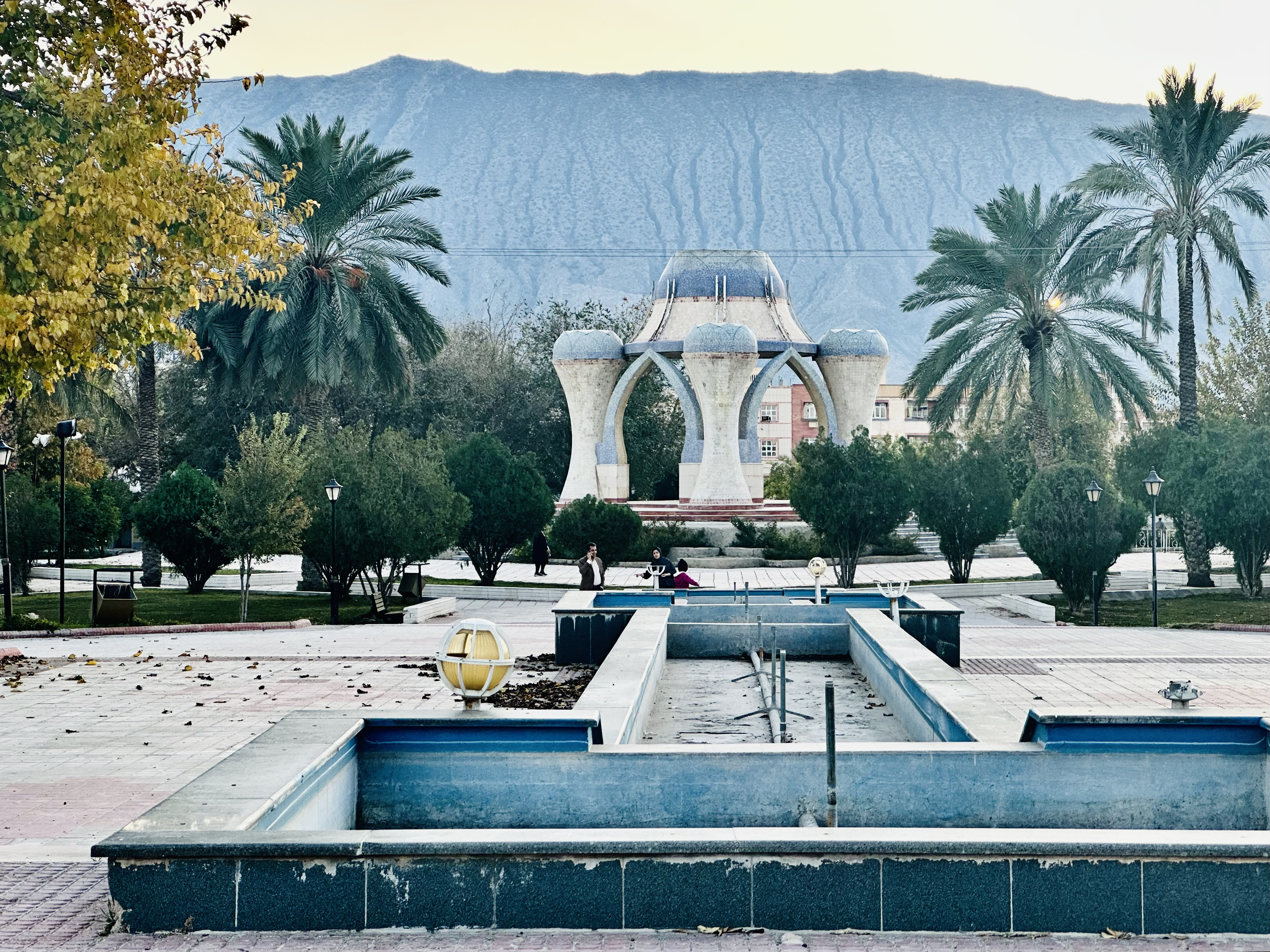
Mardani tomb in Kazerun

== Mardani Art Cultural Institute ==
After the death of Nasrollah Mardani, a group of his relatives and family established an institution called the Mardani Art Cultural Institute to promote his thoughts and ideas. According to Mardani's will, his personal library was also donated to this cultural center. This institution is now located in Mardani Park and next to Nasrollah Mardani's tomb. Among the famous members of the board of trustees of this institution, we can mention Gholam-Ali Haddad-Adel. Assad-Allah Imani was also a member of this institution until his death.

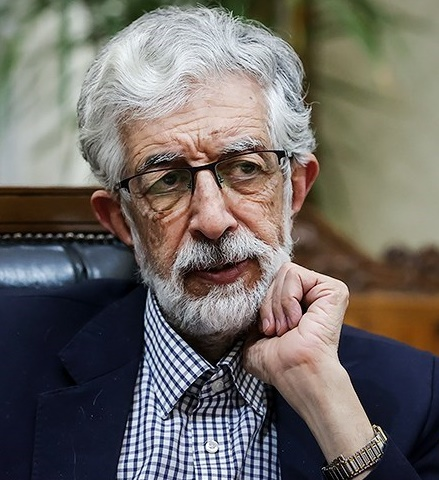
Gholam-Ali Haddad-Adel, Former chairman of the Parliament and President of Academy of Persian Language and Literature

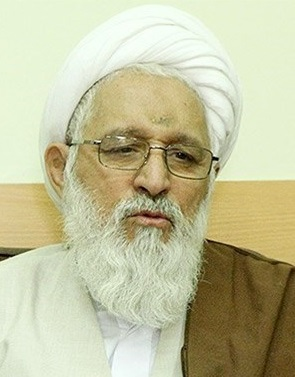
Assad-Allah Imani, Former member of assembly of experts, and the Former Imam of Prayer in Kazerun and Shiraz.

== Resources ==
- Nasrollah Mardani (Persian Wikipedia)
- IBNA
- Mehr News Agency
- Art Magazine
- Journal of Sacred Defense Literature Bi-quarterly
- Birjand University
- Persian language and literature (former publication of Faculty of Literature, University of Tabriz)
- Yazd University
