= Alireza Panahian =

Iranian lecturer

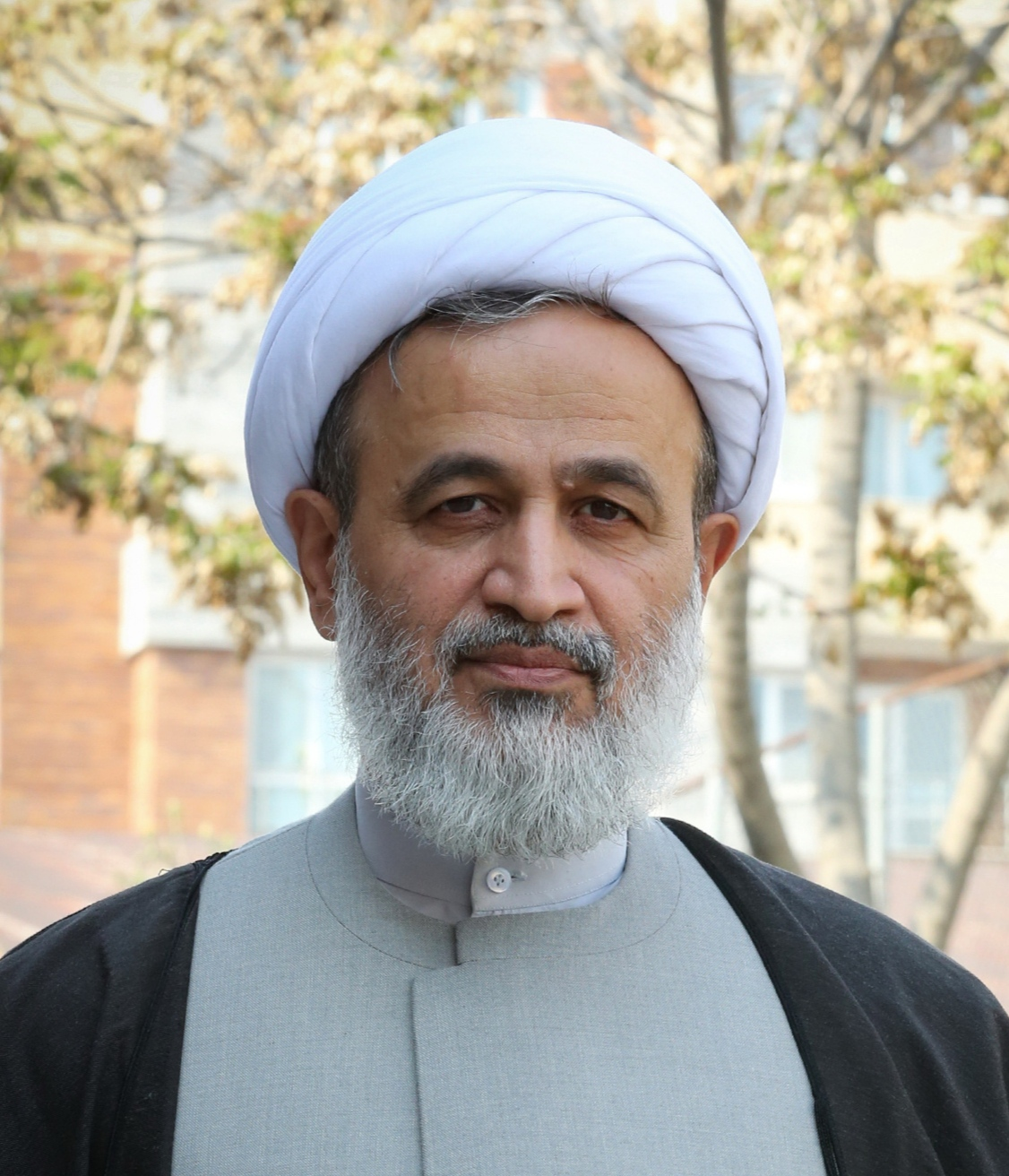
- Panahian in 2020
- Born: 1965 (age 60–61); Tehran, Imperial State of Iran
- Occupation: Lecturer
- Website: https://panahian.net/

Ali Reza Panahian (also Ali-Reza Panahian; Persian: علیرضا پناهیان; born 1965 Tehran) is an Iranian Twelver Shia Scholar and official. He is a Hojatoleslam (a "middle-ranked" Shia cleric) and head of Iranian Supreme Leader Ali Khamenei's "think tank for universities." In February 2011 he was among some "70 high-ranking" officials of the Islamic Republic who established an "`Ammar` organization" or "Ammar Headquarters" calling for the "trial and execution" of former presidential candidates and Iranian Green Movement protest leaders Mir-Hossein Mousavi and Mehdi Karroubi. Raja News has listed him as one of 40-odd "students, confidants and political companions" close to most ideological leader Ayatollah Mohammad-Taqi Mesbah-Yazdi.

Panahian also addressed the 2010 "Islamic Unity Seminar" in Lahore, Pakistan on the subjects of the Prophet Muhammad's "character and Islamic Unity."

== Views ==
In July 2010 he issued a statement "calling for the purge of `liberal-minded and clean-shaven` individuals from government offices" and warned against an unnamed "group that 'will wage a war on values under the cover of Islamic slogans and symbols'".

He believes that religiosity must be accompanied by inner passion and happiness.

He also lectures extensively on apocalypse and Mahdism family and raising children, and publishing Shiism. Mohammadbaqer saeedi

== Speech ==
In a speech, he criticized the government of Israel and commented on the growing regional influence of Iran. He argued that Iran’s strength had altered the strategic balance in the region and suggested that alternative forms of conflict, including informational and technological means, were becoming more significant. He also expressed the view that the removal of Israel would lead to increased security and stability in the region, particularly within Islamic societies.

== See also ==
- Hassan Rahimpour Azghadi
- Mohsin Qara'ati
- Hassan Abbasi
- Seyyed Abdollah Fateminia
