= Mahdi Elahi Ghomshei =

Iranian poet, philosopher and translator (1901–1973)

Ayatollah Mahdi Elahi Ghomshei
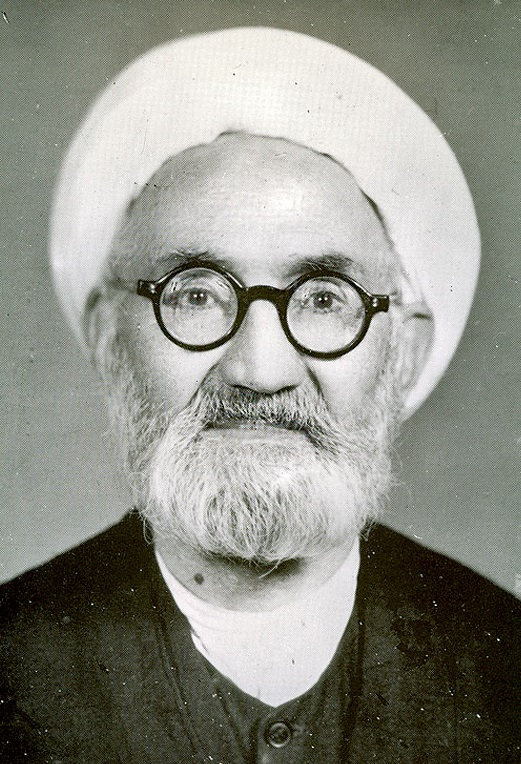

Personal life
- Born: 1901 Shahreza, Sublime State of Iran
- Died: 15 May 1973 (aged 71–72) Qom, Imperial State of Iran
- Resting place: Fatima Masumeh Shrine, Qom
- Main interest(s): Islamic philosophy, jurisprudence

Religious life
- Religion: Islam

Muslim leader
- Disciple of: Molla Muhammad Mahdi Farzaneh Qomshehei, Hasan Amin Jafari, Sheykh Muhammad hakim Khorasani, Sayyed Hasan Modarres, Aqa Bozorge hakim, The Grand Ayatollah Hajj Aqa Hosein Qommi, Sheykh Asadollah Yazdi, Fazil, Fazin Barsi, Hajj Mirza Hasan faqih Sabzevari Khorasani, Mirza Mahdi Esfahani, Mirza Tahir Tonekaboni

Mahdi Elahi Ghomshei (Persian: مهدی الهی قمشه‌ای; 1901 – 15 May 1973) was an Iranian mystic, poet, translator of the Quran, and one of the grand Masters of the philosophical school of Tehran.

== Family ==
His family were originally from Bahrain. Most of them were sophisticated men of knowledge. They resided in Shahreza, where he was born in 1319 lunar Islamic year. He was known as the reviver of religion (Mohyy Al Din). He selected the title of Elahi in his poems. Mahdiye Elahi Ghomshei and Hossein Elahi Ghomshei are his children.

== Education ==
He was under supervision of Grand masters from different cities such as Esfahan, Najaf, Mashhad and Tehran.

=== Teachers ===
He had many teachers, including: Molla Muhammad Mahdi Farzaneh Qomshehei, Hasan Amin Jafari. Sheykh Muhammad hakim Khorasani, Sayyed Hasan Modarres, Aqa Bozorge hakim, The Grand Ayatollah Hajj Aqa Hosein Qommi, Sheykh Asadollah Yazdi, Fazil, Fazin Barsi, Hajj Mirza Hasan faqih Sabzevari Khorasani, Mirza Mahdi Esfahani, Mirza Tahir Tonekaboni.

== Career ==
He taught in Sepahsalar School, University of Tehran for 35 years.

== Translation ==
Ghomshei translated for the first time the Quran into Persian such that this translation was up to date along with the summary of other commentaries. The translation was also honored by the grand Ayatollah Bojnourdi.

== Pupils ==
Some of his pupils: Allameh Hasanzadeh, Allameh Abdollah Javadi-Amoli, Ayatollah Hajj Sayyed Muhammad Hasan Langroudi, Ayatollah Sayyed Razi Shirazi, Kazim Midir Shanehchi, DR sayyed Muhammad Baqir Hojjati, Muhammad Baqir Muhaqiq, Sheykh Abdul Rahim Malakian.

== Works ==
He wrote many books and notes in diverse religious sciences. Some of them are as follows:

- Translation of Quran
- Selected of Commentaries
- Notes on Abul Fotuh Al Razi's commentary in 10 volumes.
- Translation and explanation of Sahifah Sajjadiyyah
- Divine wisdom
- The explanation of fosus Al Hikmah of Al-Farabi
- The philosophy of Al-Farabi
- The Divine unity of Sages (Doctoral Dissertation)
- Mystical courses of Alavid' s school
- Treatise in universal philosophy
- Treatise in degrees of love

== Death ==
He died on the twelfth of second Rabi 1356 solar. He was buried near the Fatima Masumeh Shrine in Qom in Vadi Al Salam.
