= Hamid Reza Shekarsari =

Iranian poet

- حمیدرضا شکارسری
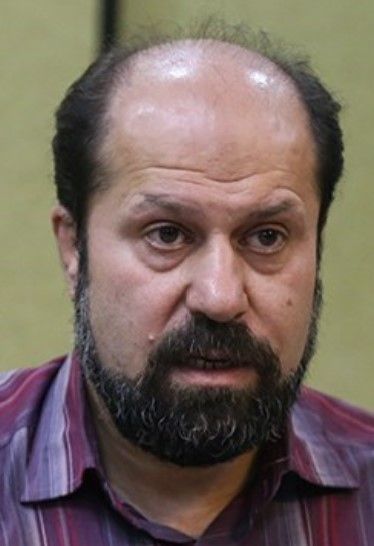
- Born: June 17, 1966 (age 60); Tehran, Iran
- Education: Bachelor's degree of Geology
- Alma mater: Shahid Beheshti University
- Occupations: Poet, author, literary critic, researcher, geologist
- Awards: Holy Defense Year Book Award; Iran's Book of the Year Awards; Golden Pen Festival of Iran Year Book; Razavi Year Book Festival; Golden Pen Award of Iran; Lorestan Province Book of Year; First Qods Literary Prize Winner; Famous Poet of Fajr Poetry Festival

Hamid Reza Shekarsari (Persian: حمیدرضا شکارسری, born on 1966 in Tehran) is an Iranian poet, researcher, author and literary critic. He has published more than 20 volumes of poetry and literary research.

== Life and careers ==
Hamid Reza Shokarsari was born on 17 June 1966 in Tehran, Iran. He spent the first few years of his life in the north of Iran because his parents were from Rasht and Anzali. Until he completed his primary education and then entered Shahid Beheshti University to study geology. After completing his education, he was hired by the Ministry of Roads and Transport of Iran and worked there. He has been writing poetry since he was 16 years old, and for the first time in 1983, a sonnet from him was published in a magazine. Then, since 1986, he entered the field of poetry seriously. He began to criticize poetry since 1992. As a result, he entered the publishing world with his first book of poetry collection in 1996, entitled "Baz JomeEyi Gozasht (title means Another Friday Passes)". In addition, he has also been responsible for the literary center of the Young Cultural Center of Tehran.

== Awards ==
Hamid Reza Shekarsari has received numerous literary awards so far, some of which are listed below:

- His book "Hamaseye Kalamat (title means Epic of Words), Review of the 20 Years of Holy Defense Poetry" has been selected as Book of Year in Holy Defense Year Book Award in 2002 and has also received the title of the Book of the Year in Poetry section of Holy Defense Year Book Award in 2004.
- His book "Cheraghanie bi Dalil (title means Unreasobale lighitning)" was recognized as the Book of the Year at Holy Defense Year Book Award in 2006 and was honored in Poetry section of Iran's Book of the Year Awards in same year. Also, it was final candidate of Golden Pen Book Festival of Iran in 2005.
- His poem collection "Aseman Zire Abrha (title means The sky under the clouds)" was selected book of third Razavi Book Festival in Modern Poetry section in 2010.
- His book "Asre Payane Mojezat (title means The era of no miracles)" was the final nominee of Iran's Book of the Year Awards in 2009.
- His book "Chizi Ghotb Nama ha ra Divaneh Mikonad (title means Something drives the compasses crazy)" was the Book of the Year of Holy Defense Year Book Award in Poetry section in 2010.
- His book "Asheghane hayee Baraye Doshman (title means The Romances for Enemy)" has become the Book of the Year of Holy Defense Year Book Award in Poetry section in 2014.
- His book "Talangore Baran (title means Flick of the Rain)" has won the Golden Pen Award of Iran in 2016.
- His book "Zist dar Mane JamEe (title means Living in collective character)" (Compilation with Mohammad Reza Roozbeh) was introduced as one of the five books of the year in fourth Holly Defense Book Festival of Lorestan Province in 2011.
- The selected poet of the Fajr Poetry Festival in the poetry section in 2008.
- Article presentation and poetry reading at Istanbul International Poetry Festival in 2009 and Universal Poetry Festival in China in 2012.
- The selected Artistic Expert by Jame Jam TV in 2010.
- As a representative of Iran, participated in Sarajevo Poetry Festival at Bosnia and Herzegovina in 2017.
- The selected poet and winner of the First Qods Literature Award.
- In January 2016, he was honored with the title of "Song of Liberation" by Iranian Poets and Literary Association.
- Judging dozens of national and provincial poetry festivals and congresses in Iran.

== Translated books ==
In 2018, an excerpt from Hamid Reza Shekarsari's poems was translated into Istanbul Turkish by Shirin Rad in a book entitled "From the Heart of Tehran to the Heart of Istanbul" for publication in Turkey.

Also, the book "Asre Payane Mojezat", is a bilingual Persian-English book with English title of "The Era of No Miracles" which translated by Jedan Sepehri and Hossein Ahmadi and published in 2008.

== Bibliography ==
- Cheraghanie bi Dalil (title means Unreasobale lighitning), Collection of poems on the subject of Sacred Defense, 2005
- Az Tamame Roshanayiha (title means From all the lights), Poetry Collection, 2003
- Pirtar az Khod (title means Older than self), Poetry Collection, 2008
- Az Sokout be Harf (title means From silence to speech), Collection of Literary Criticism, 2003
- Shelikam Kon: Pish az Anke Baroutam Nam Bekeshad! (title means Fire me: Before my gunpowder get moistured!), Analytical articles on the subject of resistance poetry, group of authors, 2011
- Aseman Zire Abrha (title means The sky under the clouds), Collection of Poems about Imam Reza, 2007
- Asre Payane Mojezat (title means The era of no miracles), Poetry Collection, 2008
- Hamasehaye Maktabi (title means The Doctrine Epics), Articles on the subject of Ashura poetry, 2011
- Teroriste Asheq (title means The Terrosrist in Love), Selected Poems, 2008
- Hoftado do Ghatreh Ashke Ashurayi (title means Seventy-Two drops of Ashura tears), Collection of Ashura Poems, 2012
- Zist dar Mane JamEe (title means Living in collective character), Criticism of Holy Defense Poetry Works, along Dr. Mohammad Reza Rouzbeh, 2010
- Chizi Ghotb Nama ha ra Divaneh Mikonad (title means Something drives the compasses crazy), Free Poems Collection about Holy Defense, 2009
- Tanha Barf Kooch Nakarde Ast (title means Only the snow did not immigrate), Blank Verse Collection, 2012
- Har Shaer Derakhtist (title means Each poet is a tree), Selected Poetry by Members of the Young Cultural Literary Center of Tehran, 2011
- Zarihe Sadeh (title means Simple Shrine), Selected religious poems from 1990 to 2007, 2008
- Chatre Shoureshi (title means The Rebel umbrella), 100 Short Poetry with Cloud Theme, 2011
- Zayesh Marg haye Matn (title means Births and Deaths of the text), Review of Blank Verse Poems, 2011
- Zayesh Marg haye Matn 2 (title means Births and Deaths of the text 2), Criticism and Interpretation of Persian Poetry, 2016
- Zayesh Marg haye Matn 3 (title means Births and Deaths of the text 3), Criticism of contemporary short poems, 2019
- Parantez haye Shekasteh (title means Broken brackets), Poetry Collection, 2009
- Baz JomeEyi Gozaht (title means Another Friday Passes), Poetry Collection, 1996
- Gozideye Adabiate Moaser (title means A selection of contemporary literature), Free Poems Collection, 1999
- Hamaseye Kalamat (title means Epic of Words), Review of the 20 Years of Holy Defense Poetry, 2001
- Rade Pa bar Labeye Tiq (title means Spoor on the edge of the razor), Free Poems Collection, 2015
- Asheghane haye Tarik Roshan (title means The Bright and Gloomy Romances), Romantic Poetry Collection, 2013
- Che Tanhast Mah (title means What a lonely moon), A collection of Blank Verse poems, 2016
- Asheghane haye Posti (title means Postal romances), Poetry Collection, 2016
- Shab Nameh (title means Letter of the Night), A poem collection with theme of night, 2018
- Shekl haye Faramooshi (title means Shapes of oblivion), Collection of short and free poems, 2017
- Tazahorate Harf haye Ezafeh (title means Demonstrations of extra talks), Free Poems Collection, 2017
- Boseye Tarsoo (title means Timid kiss), Collection of social poems, 2017
- Dalile Panjereh (title means Reason of Window), A collection of poems about Laylat al-Qadr, 2017
- Haft Sin dar Bahman Mah (title means Haft-sin in Bahman), Poetry Collection, 2017
- Asheghane hayee Baraye Doshman (title means The Romances for Enemy), Poetry Collection, 2013
- Saye Roshan haye Sayeh (title means Bright Shades of Shadows), A Review of Hushang Ebtehaj's Poems, 2019
- Asheghane haye Pekan (title means The Beijing's Romances), Blank Verses Collection, 2013
- Estemrare Tazegi (title means The continuity of novelty), A critique and analysis of the works of several contemporary poets, 2019
- Be Ensan Migoftand Andooh (title means Human called grief), Poetry Collection, 2018
- Shekl haye Forootani (title means The Figures of Humility), Free Poems Collection, 2013
- Talangore Baran (title means Flick of the Rain), Juvenile Poetry Collection, 2015
- Shekl haye Leila (title means The Figures of Leila), Romantic poetry collection, 2018
- Shekl haye Marg (title means The Figures of Death), Free Short Poetry Collection, 2016
- Tarife Tazeye Andooh (title means A New Definition of Sadness), A collection of Poems about Ruhollah Khomeini, 2015
- Moamaye Pirahane Tow (title means The riddle of your shirt), Free romantic poetry collection, 2015
- Satri Por az Meyle Booseh (title means A line with full passion of kiss), Social and political and romantic poetry, 2017
- Tamrine Sokout Mikonam Baed az Tow (title means I practice silence after you), Collection of Quatrains, 2019
- Cheraq Qovveh dar Chashme Khorshid (title means Flashlight in the eye of sun), Free Poems Collection, 2018
- Shekl haye Goor (title means The Figures of the grave), Free Poems Collection, 2018
- Be Dashtane Tow Edameh Midaham (title means I'll keep having you), Blank Verses Collection, 2018
- Asheghane haye Renoye Pire Ghermez (title means The old red Renault romances), Blank Verses Collection, 2019

== See also ==
- List of Persian poets and authors
