= Holy Defense Year Book Award =

The Holy Defense Year Book Award (Persian: کتاب سال دفاع مقدس) is an international literary award presented yearly since 1993.

This is an award presented by the Government of Iran to authors, poets and researchers in recognition of distinguished merit in the fields of Resistance Literature.

== Winners ==
8th award

- Narges Abyar, Mountain on the shoulders tree
- Morteza Avini, Heavenly Treasures

9th award

- Masoumeh Ramhormozi, Eternal Fragrance

13th award

- Saeed 'Akif, Fill vacancies
- Akbar Sahraei, Boxwood and wish IV
- Ahmad Dehqan, Dashtban

16th award (2014)

- Behnaz Zarabi Zadeh, Daughter Of Sheena
- Masoumeh Abad, I'm Alive
- Ahmad Dehqan, Blog

17th award (2018)

18th award (2019)

== See also ==
- List of history awards
