= Tahereh Saffarzadeh =

Iranian litterateur and teacher

- Born: 1936; Sirjan, Iran
- Died: 25 October 2008 (age 72); Tehran, Iran
- Education: University of Tehran
- Occupations: Translator, Writer, Poet
- Writing career
- Language: Persian, English, Arabic
- Notable works: The Holy Quran: English & Persian Translation With Commentary

Tahereh Saffarzadeh (Persian: طاهره صفارزاده, 1936 in Sirjan, Kerman Province, Iran – October 25, 2008 in Tehran, Iran) was an Iranian poet, writer, translator and prominent university professor.

== Education ==
She received her BA in English language and literature in 1960. Several years later she left Iran for England and then to the United States. Upon being accepted as a member of International Writing Program, she also enrolled for M. F. A program which is essentially designed so as to enable the writers, the poets, the painters etc., to teach their fields of art both in practical workshops and theoretical courses, at university level. For her degree she studied major contemporary world literature with a special focus on practical literary criticism and translation workshops.

== Works ==
Saffarzadeh published fourteen volumes of poems. She is also the author of ten books on the principles of translation regarding literary, scientific and Qur'anic texts.

In regards to effectiveness of science of translation, Saffarzadeh has presented several theories of which "the Scientific Progression via Translation" has been regarded the most notable one. In the book "Translating the Fundamental Meanings of the Holy Qur'an" (1999) which is a genuine research on the English and Persian Translations of Qur'an, she has succeeded in finding the main flaws and shortcomings; and by depiction of those defects she has introduced a new gate of approach in finding equivalents in the domain of translation of the Qur'an the effect of which has appeared as this remarkable conceptual translation. She published her bilingual translation of the Qur'an in Persian and English in 2001, which is the first bilingual translation of the Qur'an, and the first translation of the Qur'an into English by a woman.

== Awards and honors ==
She was chosen by "Organization of Afro-Asian Writers" in 2005 and According to Egypt's "Culture and Information Minister" Muhammad Majdi Marjan who heads the Organization:

The letter reads in part,

"In a bid to commemorate the leading and elite women of letters we have chosen the internationally renowned Iranian poetess Tahereh Saffarzadeh, with whose long history of struggles the entire Islamic Ummah is familiar, as the leading woman in the Islamic world and at the international scene of 2005."

According to Organization of Afro-Asian Writers:

Tahereh Saffarzadeh the great Iranian committed poetess and writer is an exalted example for the muslim believing women, that all muslims honour her status and due to her political fighting background, and her profound knowledge, this year she was elected to be celebrated by this organization.

== Sources ==
- http://zamaaneh.com/news/2008/10/post_6780.html
- http://www.farsnews.ir/newstext.php?nn=8708040168
- http://atiban.com/article.aspx?id=3164
