= I'm Alive (book) =

Book by Masoumeh Abad

- Front cover of the Persian edition.
- Author: Masoumeh Abad
- Original title: Persian: من زنده ام
- Language: Persian, English, Arabic, Urdo, German, French
- Genre: Novella
- Published: 2012 Broj Publication Company (Iran)
- Publication place: Iran
- Media type: Book

I'm Alive (Persian: من زنده ام) is a book written by Masoumeh Abad about her memories in the Iran–Iraq war (1980–1988). Masoumeh, who was 17 at the time, was a social worker in a field hospital and in medical clinics for the Iranian Red Crescent Society during the war. The English translation of I'm Alive launched on the Frankfurt Book Fair. I'm Alive has received the Sacred Defense Book of The Year award has been reprinted many times in Iran. The idea for writing the novel came to Abad in 2012.

This book is one of the first published works about the Iranian women's roles during this period, which opened the way for the publication of similar works. Ali Khamenei, Supreme leader of Iran, read the book and appreciated Abad for her efforts in Iran-Iraq war.

== Author ==
Masoumeh Abad was born on 5 September 1962 in a religious family who were active during and after the Iranian Revolution. She is native of southern Iran and when was 17 years old the Iran-Iraq war started. Masoumeh Abad is an Iranian writer, university professor, and politician.

== Narrative ==
Abad's memories of the Iran-Iraq War are contained in I'm Alive. She also narrated his memoirs of captivity while she was serving a four-year prison sentence. The book consists of seven chapters. The first and second chapters are about Abad's childhood and adolescence period in Abadan. The third Chapter narrates Iranian Revolution. Fourth, fifth and sixth chapters are written about the war and Abad's captivity memoirs in Al-Rashid prison in Baghdad city, Mousel, and Al-Anbar camps.

== Publication ==
The book was first published in Persian by Broj Publication Company in 2012. It has also been translated into English, Arabic, Urdu, German and French.

== Translator ==
The book translated to English by Paul Sprachman, professor of Rutgers University. The book has been translated in Urdu language. Translated by Zaheer Abbass Ja'fri and published by Muttahari Fikri wa Saqafati Markaz Kashmir. Translating this book in Urdu was a praiseworthy effort and can cover a large readership across South Asia.

== Awards ==
I'm Alive has received an award in the 16th Sacred Defense Book of The Year award in Iran.

== See also ==
- Iran–Iraq War
- Battle of Khorramshahr
- Peace Be On Ibrahim
- Noureddin, Son of Iran
- One Woman's War: Da (Mother)
- That Which That Orphan Saw
- List of Iranian commanders in the Iran–Iraq War
- Chess with the doomsday machine
- Fortune Told in Blood
- Journey to Heading 270 Degrees
- Baba Nazar (book)
