= 23 People =

Group of Iranian prisoners in the Iran-Iraq War

23 People refers to a group of Iranian teenagers who were captured by Iraqi forces in 1982 during the Iran–Iraq War. They ranged in age from 13 to 17 years old at the time, and they were members of the Tharallah Brigade of Kerman. A famous book was written about the subject and based on the memoirs of Ahmad Yousefzadeh (one of the captives), Those 23 People, which was published by Soore Mehr Publication.

A film based on the events and Ahmad Yousefzadeh's book, 23 People, was released in 2019. It was produced by Mehdi Jafari and sponsored by Owj Arts and Media Organization in Tehran. The film features actors such as Majid Potki, Reza Noori and Abolfazl Amiri (who was present in this film as a stuntman under the supervision of Mr. Bahmani).

== Event ==
The 23 teenagers were captured during Operation Beit ol-Moqaddas in different areas of the front. On May 24, 1982, with the Liberation of Khorramshahr, Saddam Hussein attempted to use them for his benefit. He had the teenagers separated from other Iranian captives and brought them to his palace, where he reportedly sympathized with them, his daughter Hala Hussain giving them flowers. Hussein said they were released with Red Cross approval. The Iraqi press produced videos and photographs of the teens and published them alongside a famous quote by Hussein, "کل اطفال العالم اطفالنا" (all the children in the world are ours). They remained in captivity until August 26, 1991.

== Adaptations ==
The event has been adapted into a book and a film, and the teens appeared on TV.

=== Book ===
Those 23 People was published based on the memoirs of Ahmad Yousefzadeh, one of the captives, by Soore Mehr Publication. Ali Khamenei, Supreme Leader of Iran, expressed his appreciation to Yousefzadeh in a letter.

=== TV program ===
From June 25 to 26, 2015, the 23 were invited as guests on the Mah-e Asal show.

=== Film ===
In 2019, a film, 23 People, based on the book was produced by Mehdi Jafari and sponsored by Owj Arts and Media Organization in Tehran. In October 2018, General Qasem Soleimani attended the movie's release and met with members of the cast and crew on location in Iran's capital. Yusefzadeh and some of the other teen captives attended the movie along with the cast and crew. Yusefzadeh said, “We were absolutely thrilled with this movie.... By watching the film, we didn’t know whether to cry or to be happy, because everything was very real in the film.”

== See also ==
- Iranian aerial victories during the Iran-Iraq war
- Battle of Khorramshahr
- Chess with the Doomsday Machine
- Eternal Fragrance
- Noureddin, Son of Iran
- That Which That Orphan Saw
- Fortune Told in Blood
- Journey to Heading 270 Degrees
