= Borunsi =

Book by Saeed A'kef

- The front cover of the first edition
- Author: Saeed 'Akif
- Original title: خاک‌های نرم کوشک (Soft soil Palace)
- Translator: Muhammad Borumandi
- Language: Persian
- Subject: Iran-Iraq War
- Genre: Memoir
- Published: 2004, Mulk 'Azam
- Publication place: Iran
- ISBN: 978-600-6123-03-5

Borunsi (Persian: خاک‌های نرم کوشک) is a selection of memoirs written by the family and friends of Abd-al-Hussain Borunsi, the commander of the 18th Brigade of Javadolaemeh during the Iran–Iraq War. Written by Saeed A'kef, the book has been reprinted more than 200 times since its first edition in 2004, and is amongst the bestselling books in Iran.

== Background ==
Abd-al-Hussain Borunsi was born in 1942 in a village in Khorasan, Iran. In his early life, he worked in construction whilst studying religious texts. He was imprisoned and tortured by SAVAK due to his intense resistance to the Pahlavi dynasty. He was killed on 14 March 1985, in the operational area of Operation Badr (1985) whilst he was commanding the 18th Brigade of Javadolaemeh. His body was left in the operational area. Twenty-seven years later, in 2011, during an investigation into Borunsi's death, his body was found and buried on the anniversary of Fatimah bint Muhammad in Mashhad.

== Publication ==
Borunsi was first published in Persian by Mulk A'zam Publication Company in 2004, and has been reprinted over 200 times. The book was published privately, since state publications were regarded as using abundant promotion, which was noteworthy for the state of Iran. According to the writer, "books similar to Borunsi had just been rejected because of the taboo, but everybody saw that books about the Iran-Iraq war could make sales too".

The book has been translated into many languages, including Urdu, Arabic, Turkish, and English. The Arabic translation sold one million copies in its first year of publication. The publisher has made claims that the Arabic and Urdu distributions of the book were stolen, translated and illegally distributed.

Borunsi was presented at the Frankfurt Book Fair in 2011.

== Narrative ==
This book is regarded as a Sacred Defense book in Iran, as it explores the life of Borunsi through the memories of his wife and friends. The book presents 70 short narratives about the character and personality of the life of the commander, each one coupled with a photo of Borunsi.

== See also ==
- Battle of Khorramshahr
- Chess with the doomsday machine
- Eternal Fragrance
- Noureddin, Son of Iran
- That Which That Orphan Saw
- One Woman's War: Da (Mother)
- Fortune Told in Blood
- Journey to Heading 270 Degrees
