= The Puzzle of the Fish Canal =

Book by Akbar Sahraee

- Author: Akbar Sahraee
- Translator: Sofia Koutlaki
- Language: Persian, English
- Publisher: Elmi-Farhangi Publication
- Publication date: 2010
- Publication place: Iran
- Media type: Book
- Pages: 28

The Puzzle of the Fish Canal (Persian: معمای کانال ماهی) is a book about Iran-Iraq war by Akbar Sahraee; The book was written for teenagers and was translated to English by Sofia A. Koutlaki. The book is a satirical story about the Iran-Iraq war. It was published by Elmi-Farhangi publication and features illustrations by Sam Soleimani. The book was written in 2010 and published in Persian by Elmi-Farhangi Publication Company. The puzzle of the fish canal will launch to the Frankfurt Book Fair.

== Plot ==
The Puzzle of the Fish Canal is mainly about the Iran–Iraq War, it focuses on an Iran-Iraq war soldier named Jalil who visits a medical department and talk about his ear ache with him. in 1980, a surprise attack on the Iranian city of Abadan marked the beginning of the Iran–Iraq War. Hundreds of thousands of people fled the badly damaged city but a small number of civilians chose to stay, living in a city under siege.

== Translator ==
Sofia Koutlaki is an independent researcher and author, born in Athens, but equally at home in Iran, Britain and Greece. Koutlaki has written “Among the Iranians” about Iran's culture and customs based on a mix of personal observation and intercultural theory. Her book was released by Nicholas Brealey Publishing in April 2010.

== Author ==
Akbar Sahraee born on 1339 A.P. in Shiraz, Iran. He wrote several humorous stories for the theater and many of them became well known.

== See also ==
- Iran–Iraq War
- Liberation of Khorramshahr
- Battle of Khorramshahr
- Mohammad Jahanara
- Noureddin, Son of Iran
- One Woman's War: Da (Mother)
- Persepolis (banned in Iran)
- List of Iranian commanders in the Iran–Iraq War
- That Which That Orphan Saw
- Chess with the doomsday machine
- Fortune Told in Blood
- Journey to Heading 270 Degrees
