= Rahian-e Noor =

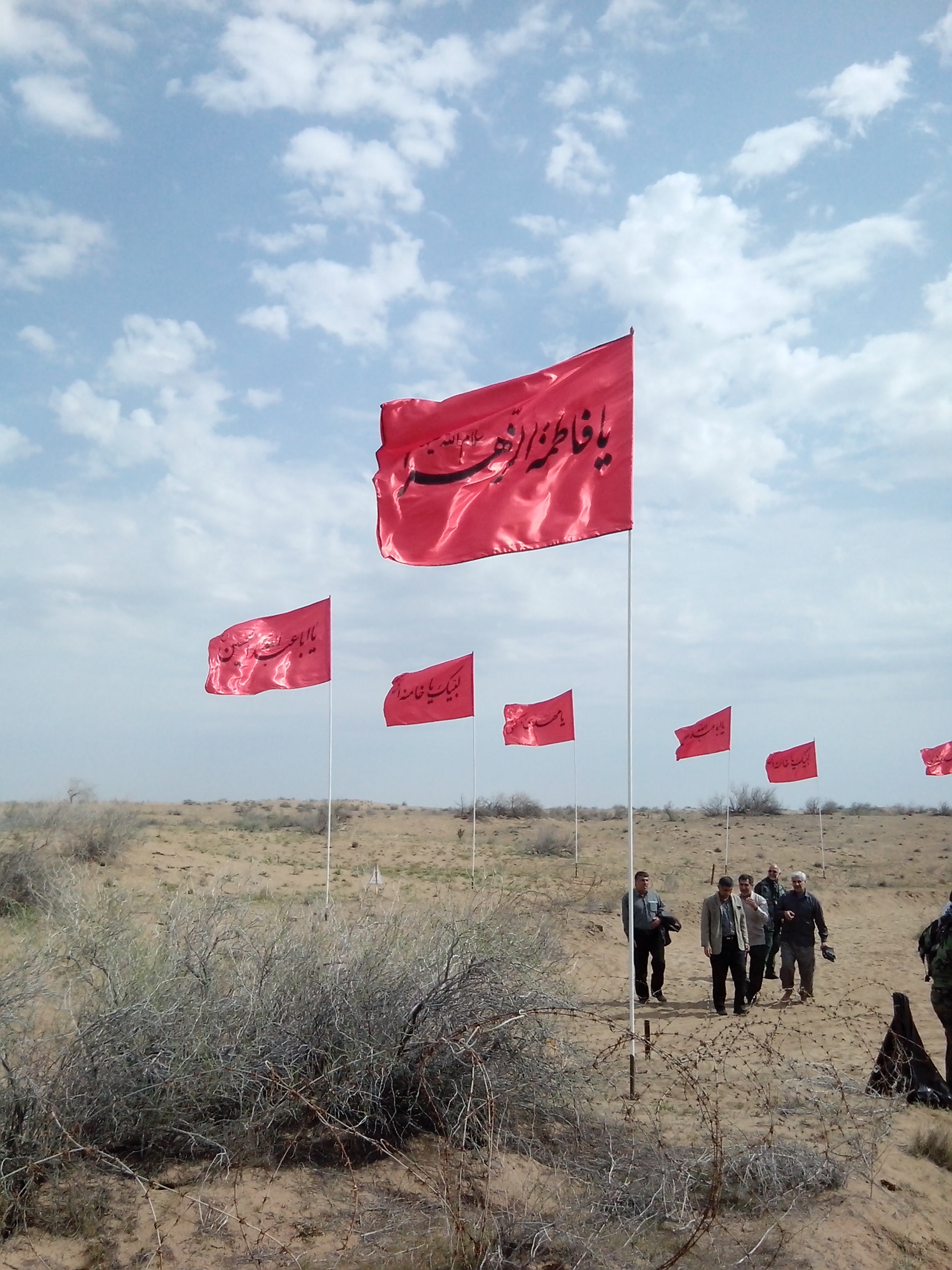
Fakkeh, one of zones at Iran-Iraq war

Rahian-e Noor (Persian: راهیان نور, lit. 'The passengers of light') is the group of religious and political caravans which travel between visiting zones in south and southwestern in Iran to commemorate Iranian efforts and lives lost in the Iran–Iraq War. The caravans of Rahian-e Noor typically travel to war zones around the time of Nowruz - the Iranian New Year - and during summer vacation.

== History ==
Rahian-e Noor was established in 1997 by the student branch of the Basij; its name was selected by military organizations of the Iranian Islamic Revolution. Supreme Leader of Iran Ayatollah Khamenei visited the Iranian war zone in 1999 and 2002 to support the movement. In 2005, he ordered the creation of a Sepah subdivision entitled the Foundation for the Preservation and Publication of Sacred Defense Works and Values to officially support the caravans.

"Shade Of Earth" is a series by photography Abbas Kowsari; it has been compared Robert Fisk's book The Great War for Civilisation, which discussed the Iran-Iraq War and described public conditions of and reactions to the conflict. Kowsari's series portrays the hundreds of thousands of Iranian visitors during Rahian-e Noor, many of whom lost family in the war.

== War tourism ==
Tourist observation of Iranian defenses of the Iran-Iraq War - known by Iranians as the Sacred Defence - is a key component of Iran's tourism industry. The memorial purportedly seeks to educate native and foreign tourists while they visit the war zones, although some regard it as a propaganda effort. Some tourism researchers attribute visitor interest to nostalgia and cultural factors.

== Reception ==
During the 2010 Rahian-e Noor, Ayatollah Khamenei praised the event in a speech, saying, "Iranians should never forget about the sensitive, historical and honourable time of the Sacred Defence because it was a priceless experience".

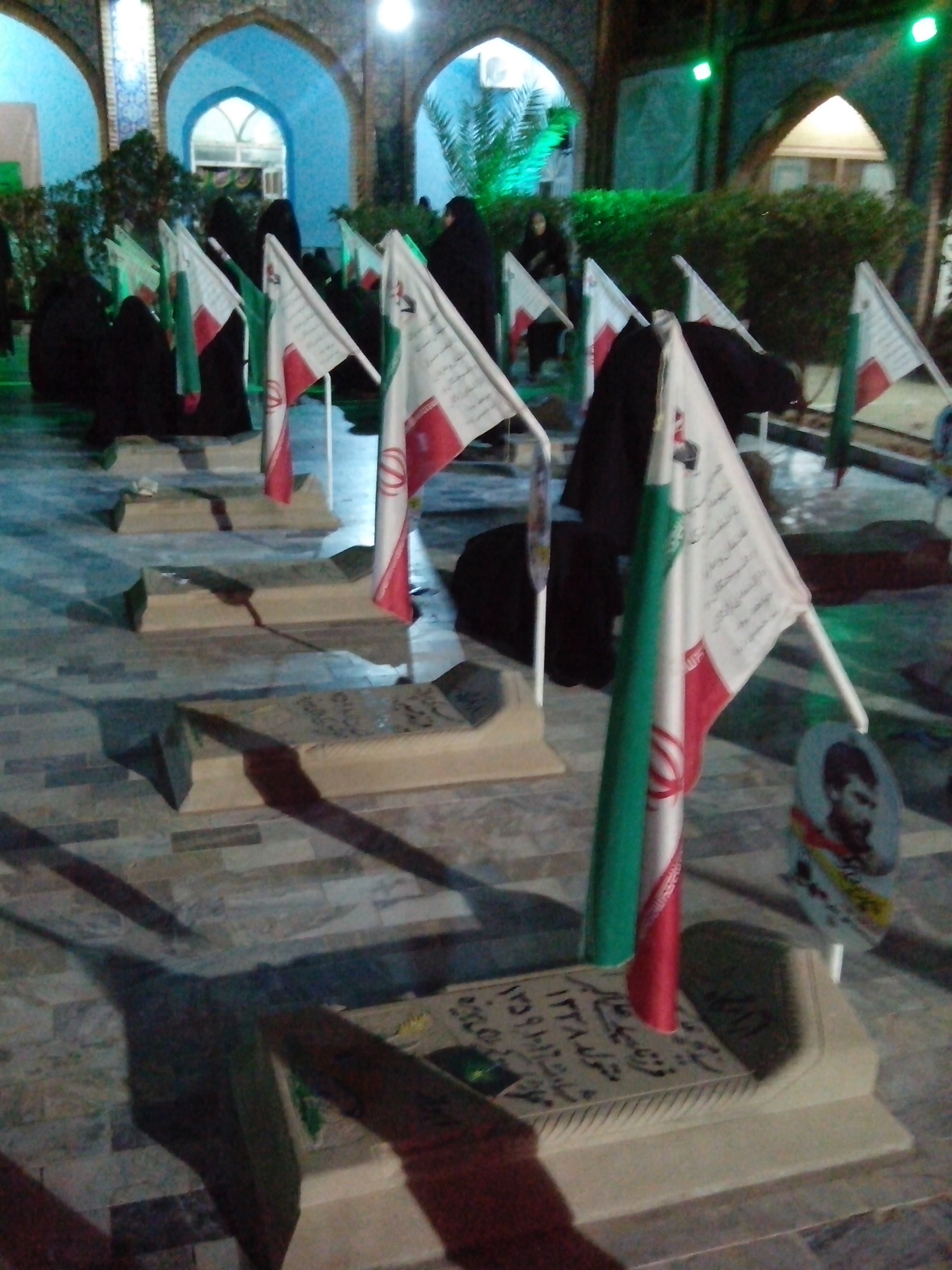
Graves of soldiers at the Hoveyzeh

In recent years, the memorial has included seminars promoting anti-Green movement and anti-sedition positions; this, in addition to multiple accidents resulting in tourist deaths, has led to heavy criticism by some activists. The memorial ended with no road accidents in 2013 while according to the Brigadier general Eskandar Momeni, chief of traffic Police, Khuzestan Province were among the top five with most road accidents in the same year. Central headquarters of Rahian-e Noor took some actions to reduce the accidents among them prohibition of buses moving at night, devising rest places for drivers and participants, putting emphasis on using buses with high technical status and use of Emdad Yavar system.

== See also ==
- Noureddin, Son of Iran
- One Woman's War: Da (Mother)
- Eternal Fragrance (Last Sunday)
- A City Under Siege: Tales of the Iran-Iraq War
- Persepolis
- War of the Cities (of Iran-Iraq war)
- Foundation for the Preservation and Publication of Sacred Defense Works and Values
