= Baba Nazar (book) =

2009 book by Hossein Beyzayi

- Editor: Mostafa Rahimi; Ahmad Dehqan
- Author: Hossein Beyzayi
- Original title: بابا نظر
- Language: Persian
- Subject: Iranian Revolution, Iran–Iraq War
- Genre: Memoirs, War
- Publisher: Sooreh Mehr Publications
- Publication date: 2009
- Publication place: Iran
- English publication date: 2014
- Pages: 520
- Awards: Selected work in the memoir section in 13th Holy Defense Year Book Award
- ISBN: 9789645061485; Persian Edition

Baba Nazar (Persian: بابا نظر) is a book written by Hossein Beyzayi and edited by Mostafa Rahimi and Ahmad Dehqan. The book is the result of oral interviews with Mohammad Hassan Nazarenejad, during which the narrator recounts his stories about Iranian Revolution and Iran–Iraq War. Mohammad Hassan Nazarenejad known as Baba Nazar, the narrator of this book, was in the Iran–Iraq War for 140 months who died eight years after the war because of war injuries, in 1997.

== Synopsis ==
The book formed from 36 hours conversation of Hossein Beyzayi with Mohammad Hassan Nazarenejad in 1996 which is recorded in video form and the fate of those films is unknown. But the words and sentences of the interviews have become text after recording. Overall, this book is a memoir of Mohammad Hassan Nazarenejad in Iranian Revolution time and Iran–Iraq War time.

In the beginning, The narrator talks about his campaign activities against the Pahlavi dynasty before the revolution. Then he goes to Iran–Iraq War. He describes the war operations with great detail. He talks about all his moments in the war and depicts hopes and frustrations, fears and immunities, anxieties and reliefs.

This book has been compiled in eighteen chapters. The last part of the book is devoted to photographs and documents. The book is the result of dozens of hours of oral history narration by Mohammad Hassan Nazarenejad dictated to Hossein Beyzayi. Beside the oral history, the book also contains autobiography by the narrator.

== Publication ==
The book was first published in Persian by Sooreh Mehr Publication in 2009, which has had more than 55 reprints in four years, according to the publishers. The book was translated from Persian to English and Published in August 2014 by Sooreh Mehr Publication.

== Reception ==
Ezzatolah Entezami an Iranian actor, Mohammad Bagher Ghalibaf an Iranian conservative politician and former military officer, Yahya Rahim Safavi an Iranian military commander, Mojtaba Rahmandoust an Iranian conservative politician and Parviz Parastui an Iranian actor and singer, they have praised this book and write notes for it. The book was selected as the Outstanding Book in the Memoirs Section of the Thirteenth Holy Defense Year Book Award.

== See also ==
- Chess with the Doomsday Machine
- The Night Bus
- Eternal Fragrance
- One Woman's War: Da (Mother)
- Noureddin, Son of Iran
- Peace Be On Ibrahim
- That Which That Orphan Saw
- Fortune Told in Blood
- I'm Alive (Book)
- Journey to Heading 270 Degrees
