= Knife: The Attempted Murder of Salman Rushdie =

- Release poster
- Directed by: Alex Gibney
- Based on: Knife: Meditations After an Attempted Murder by Salman Rushdie
- Produced by: Erin Edeiken; Alex Gibney; Sruthi Pinnamaneni
- Cinematography: Benjamin Bloodwell
- Edited by: Andy Grieve
- Music by: Will Bates
- Production company: Jigsaw Productions
- Distributed by: Abramorama
- Release dates: January 25, 2026 (Sundance); September 17, 2026 (New York City)
- Running time: 107 minutes
- Country: United States
- Language: English

Knife: The Attempted Murder of Salman Rushdie is a 2026 American documentary film which details the recovery of Salman Rushdie after his attempted assassination in 2022. The film is based on his memoir Knife: Meditations After an Attempted Murder. It is directed by Alex Gibney.

The film premiered at the 2026 Sundance Film Festival. It was released at the IFC Center in New York City on September 17, 2026. It received widespread praise from critics.

== Reception ==
On the review aggregator website Rotten Tomatoes, 97% of 34 critics' reviews are positive, with an average rating of 7.4/10. Metacritic, which uses a weighted average, assigned the film a score of 81 out of 100, based on 16 critics, indicating "universal acclaim".

Kate Erbland of IndieWire gave the film a B+ and wrote, "Rushdie provides voiceover throughout, and there is an immediate impact from hearing a man narrate his own attempted murder, and with such a calm (and often darkly humorous) demeanor." David Rooney of The Hollywood Reporter wrote, "While it feels a fraction overlong, Gibney's film is a vibrant testament to the intellectual life of its subject." Peter Sobczynski of RogerEbert.com gave the film three and a half out of four stars, writing, "This is a simple but strong document about the importance of art as a way to comment on the world, the artist's resilience in the face of the controversies their work might inspire, and the determination not to let violence be the answer to everything."
