= Ahmadzadeh =

Ahmadzadeh (Persian: احمدزاده) is a surname. Notable people with the surname include:

- Farshad Ahmadzadeh (born 1992), Iranian footballer
- Habib Ahmadzadeh, Iranian writer
- Hashim Ahmadzadeh, Iranian writer and Kurdish scholar
- Mohammad Ahmadzadeh (born 1961), Iranian footballer and manager
- Ruhollah Ahmadzadeh (born 1956), Iranian politician
