= City Under Siege =

City Under Siege may refer to:

- City Under Siege (album), a 2000 album by E.S.G.
- City Under Siege (1974 film), a 1974 Italian crime film
- City Under Siege (2010 film), a 2010 Hong Kong science fiction action film
- ESWAT: City Under Siege, a 1990 side scrolling platform video game
- A City Under Siege: Tales of the Iran–Iraq War
- Police Academy 6: City Under Siege, a 1989 comedy film, part of the Police Academy series
