= Kufi Love =

- Written by: Faezeh Yarmohammadi and Yazdan Mohammad Kazemi
- Directed by: Hassan Akhundpour
- Country of origin: Iran
- Original language: Persian

Production
- Producer: Saeed Saadi
- Production company: Owj Arts and Media Organization

Original release
- Network: Channel 3
- Release: July 2023 – 2023

Kufi Love (Persian: عشق کوفی) is a product of the Iranian Owj Arts and Media Organization directed by Hassan Akhundpour, produced by Saeed Saadi, written by Faezeh Yarmohammadi and Yazdan Mohammad Kazemi. This series consists of 15 episodes and was broadcast on Channel three from July 2023. Kufi love is a narrative of a romantic story in 61 AH and the invitation of Kufis to Hussein Ibn Ali. The story of the Kufian invitation goes through a romantic theme.

== Cast ==
Laia Zanganeh, Nader Soleimani, Saeed Sharif, Shabnam Ghorbani, Hossein Soleimani, Nader Fallah, Sogol Tahmasebi, Maryam Kaviani, Mahsa Mahjour, Mohammad Ashkanfar, Mojgan Moral, Jamal al -Din Bayat, Masoumeh Zayni Safi, Ehsan Mohseni

== Summary of the Story ==
The events of this series take place in the year 61 AH, where we see a narrative of the love of an archer named Hilal of the Alawite dynasty and a girl named Nale from the Ottoman family who engage in political and religious issues. The story takes place at the time of Muslim bin Aqil into Kufa and the events of Karbala.

== See also ==
- Mastooran
- Kufa
