= Babai Ghahraman =

Babai Ghahraman Woolina and the No Birds
- Directed by: Hossein Saffarzadegan and Meysam Hosseini
- Written by: Meqdad Akhavan
- Produced by: Mohammad Mehdi Mashkoori
- Music by: Pooya Safa
- Production companies: Owj Art Organization, Noravision
- Distributed by: Bahman Sabz
- Release dates: 25 September 2024 (Iran); 27 September 2024 (Turkey)
- Running time: 80 minutes
- Countries: Iran, Turkey
- Languages: Persian, Turkish

Babai Ghahraman (Persian: ببعی قهرمان) is an Iranian animated film directed by Hossein Saffarzadegan and Meysam Hosseini, written by Meqdad Akhavan, and produced by Mohammad Mehdi Mashkoori in 2023 by the Owj Art Organization, which was screened at the 42nd Fajr International Film Festival in 2024.

== Background ==
Babai Ghareman is derived from the 2D animated series Babai and Babaoo, which gained significant popularity on the Pouya Network and aired from 2018 to 2021.

This animation is also the third animated film produced by the Owj Organization, after The Holy Cast and The Dolphin Boy. The film was released in cinemas across the country on September 25, 2024.

== Story ==
Babai, who always reads Joghd Ghahraman magazines about flying, dreams of flying and wants to fly like a bird...

== International screenings ==
After being screened in Turkey, Azerbaijan, Kazakhstan, and Lebanon, this animation attracted more audiences and went to Vietnam, Iraq, Pakistan, and Armenia.

== Cast ==
- Arzoo Afri
- Mohammadreza Solati
- Sharara Hazrati
- Nasrallah Madqalchi
- Georges Petrousi
- Hamed Azizi
- Hamed Behdad
- Hamid Mohammadi
- Rosita Yarahmadi
- Hooman Khayyat
- Amir Manouchehri
- Mehrukh Afzali
- Sheila Azhir
- Sanam Nekoqbal
- Arezo Roshanas
- Mojtaba Fatholahi
- Nazanin Yari
- Ali Bagherli
- Khashayar Shamshirgaran
- Sara Javaheri
- Saeed Pourshafiei
- Saman Mazloumi
- Atefeh Shakouri
- Mehdi Yar Mohammadi
- Hamid Sarbandi
- Amir Hossein Rostami.

== Awards ==
Winner of the Golden Butterfly for Best Animation from the 36th International Children and Youth Film Festival.
