= Foundation for the Preservation and Publication of Sacred Defense Works and Values =

Iranian government agency

- بنیاد حفظ آثار و نشر ارزش‌های دفاع مقدس و مقاومت

Agency overview
- Formed: October 4, 1990; 36 years ago
- Type: Government agency
- Headquarters: Tehran, Iran; 35.7275837°N 51.4211863°E
- Agency executive: Bahman Kargar
- Parent department: General Staff of the Armed Forces of the Islamic Republic of Iran
- Child agencies: • Organization of Literature and History of Sacred Defense; • Holy Defense Arts and Cinema Affairs Organization; • Organization for publishing the works and values of women's participation in the sacred defense; • The headquarters of the passenger of light; • Organization of Holy Defense Documents; • Organization of Museums and Sacred Defense Monuments; • Center for Encyclopedia and History of Provincial Sacred Defense; • Holy Defense News Agency; • Organization of Veterans of Jihad and Resistance in Holy Defense; • Center for the Development and Promotion of the Culture of Sacred Defense in Cyberspace
- Website: bonyaddefa.ir

The Foundation for the Preservation and Publication of Sacred Defense Works and Values (Persian: بنیاد حفظ آثار و نشر ارزش‌های دفاع مقدس و مقاومت) is one of the institutions of the Islamic Republic of Iran with the aim of preserving the relics and disseminating the values of the Sacred Defense (Iran-Iraq war known by Iranians as the "Sacred Defence" or "Holy Defense") and promoting the culture of resistance, self-sacrifice, jihad and martyrdom. It was established by order of the Supreme Leader of Iran at the end of Iran-Iraq war in October 1990. This foundation is headed by Sardar Bahman Kargar and its parent department is General Staff of the Armed Forces of the Islamic Republic of Iran.

== Main tasks ==
- Organizing travels to the areas left by the Iran–Iraq war under caravans called Rahian-e Noor
- Participate in the construction of Iran–Iraq war museums in the cities of Iran
- Cooperation in performing funeral ceremonies and honoring the martyrs in all over Iran
- Holding literary and artistic festivals with the theme of Iran–Iraq war

== Mission ==
The main mission of the "Foundation for the Preservation and Publication of Sacred Defense Works and Values" is preserving the works and disseminating the moral and spiritual values created during Iran–Iraq War and promoting the culture of resistance, self-sacrifice, jihad and martyrdom.

== Objectives ==
The purpose of establishing the "Foundation for the Preservation and Publication of Sacred Defense Works and Values" is to protect and register the epics formed during the Iran–Iraq War and its effects on cultural, political, social, economic and military fields and prevent their destruction, distortion or oblivion.

== Duties ==
Playing a staff role (including policy-making, general guidance, coordination, monitoring and support) in preserving the cultural relics of jihad and Iran–Iraq War and entrusting executive tasks to interested organizations based on the following general tasks:

- A) Researching, identifying, collecting, preserving, compiling written and unwritten cultural, historical, artistic and scientific works and carrying out matters related to preserving the works and disseminating the values of the Iran–Iraq War in the general war policy received from Khatam al-Anbiya Central Headquarters.
- B) Selection, possession, preservation and use of physical works, including weapons, trophies, places, lands and positions, and registration of national works.
- C) Record and compile the cultural and epic foundations of the Iran–Iraq War (sacred defense) in order to transmit them to future generations and other nations.
- D) Publication of the encyclopedia of the Iran–Iraq War, history of the imposed war, the war calendar, geography of the war, planning and coordination for sending the caravans to war zones called Rahian-e Noor, pursuing the establishment of museums, cultural centers and monuments of the Iran–Iraq War (Holy Defense), festivals and memorials; In order to revive the spirit of chivalry in the Muslims and take advantage of the blessings and experiences of the Iran–Iraq War in the future with the cooperation and participation of the Armed Forces of the Islamic Republic of Iran and other relevant executive organizations.
- E) Establishing coordination in preserving the relics of sacred defense and protecting them with the best scientific methods and preventing dispersion and depreciation.
- F) Formation of technical and specialized committees, as the case may be, with the participation of relevant institutions and organizations in the field of preserving the works and values of the sacred defense and determining the quality of its exploitation.
- G) Proper utilization of the capabilities of all organizations, institutions of veterans, armed forces and cultural institutions in order to disseminate the values of Iran–Iraq War (sacred defense) and reflect its achievements in all fields.
- H) Utilizing the achievements of liberation movements, the culture of resistance and the literature of stability of other nations to develop the culture of self-sacrifice and martyrdom and endurance against global arrogance.
- I) Conducting scientific-applied research on the collection and optimal use of the works and values of the Iran–Iraq War (sacred defense) and presenting the necessary plans for the optimal protection of the works of the Iran–Iraq War (sacred defense).
- J) Provide the necessary grounds for introducing the cultural works and values of jihad and Iran–Iraq War (holy defense) through audio, video, press and electronic media and to support cultural and artistic programs related to the promotion of the culture of resistance and self-sacrifice, jihad and martyrdom especially among the younger generation, and support for research related to these topics.

== See also ==
- Foundation of Martyrs and Veterans Affairs
- 15 Khordad Foundation
- Mostazafan Foundation
- Housing Foundation of Islamic Revolution
