= Abd-al-Hussain Borunsi =

Abdolhossein Borunsi
- Born: August 25, 1942; Torbat-e Heydarieh County, Razavi Khorasan Province, Iran
- Died: March 14, 1985 (aged 43); East of Tigris, Iraq
- Burial place: Mashhad, Iran
- Military career
- Allegiance: Iran
- Branch: Islamic Revolutionary Guard Corps
- Service years: 1979–1985
- Commands: Javad-al-Aemme 18th brigade
- Conflicts: Iran–Iraq War; Operation Val-Fajr 3; Operation Badr

Abdolhossein Borunsi (Persian: عبدالحسین برونسی), was born in 1942 in a village in Torbat-e Heydarieh County, Razavi Khorasan Province, Iran. In his early life he worked in construction whilst studying religious texts on the side. He was imprisoned and tortured by SAVAK due to his intense resistance to the Pahlavi dynasty. He was killed on 14 March 1985, in the operational area of Operation Badr (1985) whilst he was commanding the 18th Brigade of Javadolaemeh. His body was left in the operational area. Twenty-seven years later, in 2011, during an investigation into Borunsi's death, his body was found and buried on the anniversary of Fatimah bint Muhammad in Mashhad.

== Activities ==
Abdolhossein Borunsi was one of the fighters against Pahlavi dynasty that was repeatedly arrested and tortured by SAVAK Before the Islamic Revolution of Iran. After the Islamic Revolution, he joined the Islamic Revolutionary Guard Corps at the beginning of the Iran–Iraq War. During this time he had various responsibilities in war. His last responsibility was commandant of Javad-al-Aemme 18th brigade that during Operation Badr (1985) he was killed in the East of Tigris. He also spent five years to study Islamic sciences. Balal battalion by his commanding during Operation Val-Fajr 3 captured the heights of "Kale-Ghandi" and the capture of Colonel Jassim Jacob, the groom and cousin of Saddam.

== Book and movie about his life ==
The book Khak-haye Narm-e Kooshk (titled in English under Borunsi) is collection of Borunsi's memories told by his wife ("Masoume SabokKhiz") and his fellow soldiers. This book was first published in Persian by Mulk A'zam Publication Company in 2004, and has been reprinted over 200 times since. The book was published privately, since state publications were regarded as using abundant promotion, noteworthy for the state of Iran. According to the writer, "books similar to Borunsi had just been rejected because of the taboo, but everybody saw that books about the Iran–Iraq War could make sales too".

The book has been translated into many languages, including Urdu, Arabic, Turkish, and English. The Arabic translation sold one million copies in its first year of publication. The publisher has made claims that the Arabic and Urdu distributions of the book were stolen, translated and illegally distributed.

Borunsi was presented at the Frankfurt Book Fair in 2011.

The film Be Kaboodi-ye Yas is an adaptation of Borunsi's life.
