= 15 Khordad Foundation =

Iranian government organization (e. 1982)

- Founded: 1981
- Headquarters: Tehran, Iran
- Key people: Hamid Reza Alianzadegan (CEO)
- Owner: Execution of Imam Khomeini's Order
- Website: http://www.1542.ir

The 15 Khordad Foundation (Persian: بنیاد پانزده خرداد, romanized: Bonyâd-e Pânzdah Xordâd) is one of the organizations created in Iran, in 1982 on orders of Ruhollah Khomeini that intend to fix the economic issues of the families of murdereds, veterans, and founders of the Iranian Revolution. This foundation is one of the Revolutionary Institutions of the Islamic Republic of Iran and is under the supervision of the Office of the Supreme Leader.

The 15 Khordad Foundation, in reality, was a supplementary office to the Foundation of Martyrs and Veterans Affairs. The scope of its activities included: the creation of the 15 Khordad Cultural and Literary Association, the collection of documents regarding the 1963 demonstrations in Iran, organizing commemoration ceremonies, construction of the 15 Khordad Dam near Qom, regulating the supply of drinking water in Qom, and many more.

The foundation is one of the organizations under the supervision of the Supreme Leader. After its creation, the foundation was under the supervision of a council appointed by Khomeini, of which one of the members was Habibollah Asgaroladi.

The foundation offered a $2.8m bounty for the murder of Salman Rushdie. Later, it increased its amount to $3.3m. In October 2022, The U.S. Department of the Treasury's Office of Foreign Assets Control imposed sanctions on 15 Khordad Foundation over this matter.

== Establishment ==
15 Khordad Foundation is an institution that was established on the 15th of Khordad 1360 by the order of the founder of the Islamic Republic of Iran, Seyyed Ruhollah Khomeini. And the purpose of its creation is to solve the economic problems of the families of the killed people (known as "martyrs") of Iran's Islamic Revolution and the war, and the deprived.

== Activities ==
Activities of the 15 Khordad Foundation include:

- Activity in the field of childbearing and population increase
- Compiling the books, like publishing the book "Fifteen Khordad, Sixty Years Later" (with the participation of National Library and Documents Organization)
- Improving the nutritional security of pregnant mothers, infants, and underprivileged children
- Support for terminally ill and cancer patients

This foundation has also built 4,600 schools, health houses, dams, etc., to serve the poor and deprived sections of the community.

The 15 Khordad Foundation has implemented various measures to enhance health and increase access to healthcare services. These initiatives include covering medical expenses for those in need, funding dental equipment and supplies, and offering free dental services in underserved areas. The foundation has also worked to alleviate the financial burden on patients with cancer and incurable diseases by covering their medical expenses. Additionally, the foundation provides financial support for the treatment and cochlear implantation of approximately 1,500 hearing-impaired and deaf children, demonstrating its commitment to hearing health. Furthermore, it has taken steps to prevent visual complications associated with amblyopia by assisting in purchasing glasses for 923 affected children.

=== Childbearing and population increase ===
The activities of this foundation in the areas related to childbearing and population increase, such as: activity and cooperation to treat the problem of infertility for 10 thousand young couples, helping to treat children with hearing problems; and supporting families with children of triplets, quadruplets and above.

== See also ==
- Barakat Foundation
- Foundation for the Preservation and Publication of Sacred Defense Works and Values
