= 23 People (film) =

2019 film by Mehdi Jafari

- Film poster
- Directed by: Mehdi Jafari
- Based on: Those 23 people by Ahmad Yousefzadeh
- Produced by: Mojtaba Faravardeh
- Cinematography: Morteza Gheidi
- Edited by: Meysam Molaei
- Music by: Arya Aziminejad
- Production company: Owj
- Distributed by: Hozeh Honari
- Release date: September 2019 (Fajr)
- Country: Iran
- Language: Persian

23 People (Persian: ۲۳ نفر, romanized: 23 Nafar) is a 2019 drama war film based on the novel 23 People. The film was directed by Mehdi Jafari and sponsored by Owj Arts and Media Organization in Tehran. Yusefzadeh and some of the other teen captives attended the movie along with the cast and crew. Yusefzadeh said, “We were absolutely thrilled with this movie.... By watching the film, we didn’t know whether to cry or to be happy, because everything was very real in the film.”

== Plot ==
23 People is an adaptation of the memoirs of the 23 young Iranian prisoners who were captured by Iraqi forces during the Iran-Iraq war in 1982. This young group was between 13 and 17 years old.

A film based on the events and Ahmad Yousefzadeh's book, 23 People, was released in 2019. It was produced by Mehdi Jafari and sponsored by Owj Arts and Media Organization in Tehran. The film features actors such as Majid Potki, Reza Noori and Abolfazl Amiri (who was present in this film as a stuntman under the supervision of Mr. Bahmani).

== Release ==
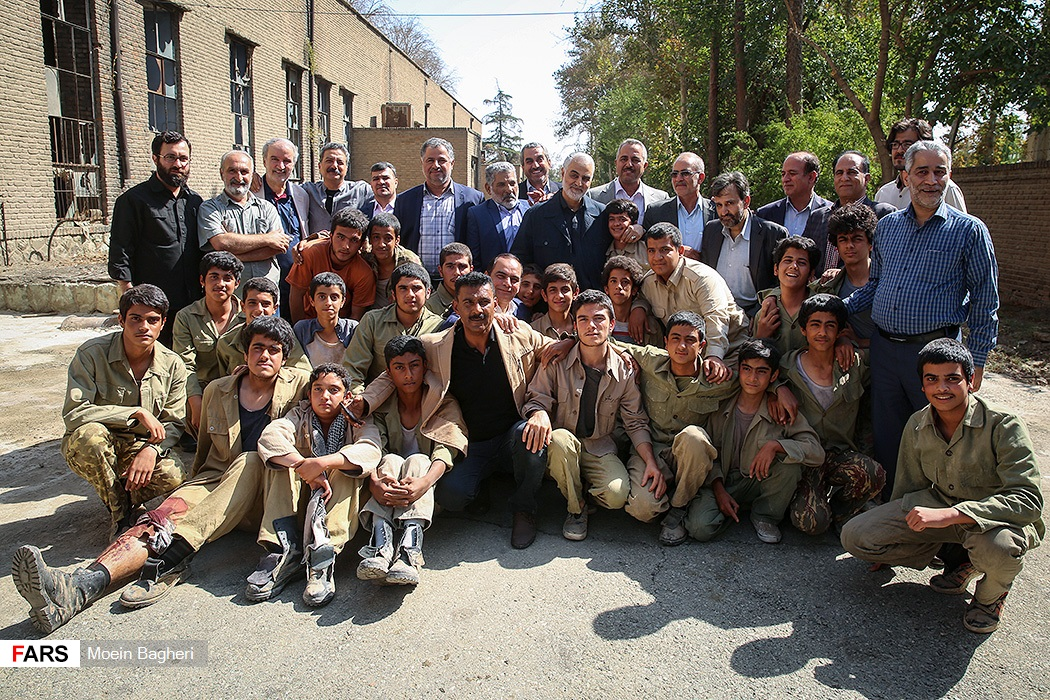

In October 2018, General Qasem Soleimani attended production of the film and met with members of the cast and crew on location in Iran's capital. The film showed at the 37th Fajr Film Festival.

== Actors ==
- Saeed AluEbadi
- Majid-Potki
- Reza Noori
- Abdulhalim Taqalobi
- AbolFazl Amiri
- Hussein Pourideh

etc.

== Awards ==
- Golden Butterfly Best Film from the Children and Adolescents Festival (2009)
- Award of the National Commission for UNESCO as the film selected for the 2019.
- Phoenix Cinema Award at the "Revolution Cinema" celebration (2016)
- Award for Best Film from a National Perspective at Fajr Film Festival.
