= Journey to Heading 270 Degrees =

Novel by Ahmad Dihqan

- Front cover of the Persian edition.
- Author: Ahmad Dihqan
- Original title: سفر به گرای ۲۷۰ درجه
- Translator: Paul Sprachman
- Language: Persian
- Subject: Iran-Iraq War
- Genre: War
- Publication place: Iran
- English publication date: 30 June 2006
- Pages: 184
- ISBN: 1568591969 (English Version)
- LC Class: 2006046154

Journey to Heading 270 Degrees (Persian: سفر به گرای ۲۷۰ درجه) is a novel by Ahmad Dehqan. The novel is set during the Iran–Iraq War and focuses on the experiences of a high school student who participates in several operations named Naser. Over 15,000 copies were published in Iran.

In 1996, the book received the award for Best Novel in the War-Themed category. In 2006, the book was translated from Persian to English by Rutgers professor Paul Sprachman and published by Mazda Publishers. The novel is available at the Library of Congress. The book is used as reading material in the "Introduction to the Literature of the Modern Middle East" course available at Rutgers.

== Publisher ==
The first edition was published by Sarir Publication Company in 1996. It was reprinted thereafter. In 2005, Soreie Mehr Publication Company published the second edition. In 2006, Mazda Publishers printed a paperback edition in the United States.

== Synopsis ==
Journey to Heading 270 Degrees is a novel about the Iran-Iraq War. It tells the story of Naser, a veteran of several battles, while in high school. Unable to resist the pressure to join the military, he returns to the war front to find himself in the midst of one of the war's most decisive clashes. The Iraqis attack Iranian fortified positions in tanks while Naser's unit repels them on foot. During the battle, Naser loses several comrades but gains an understanding of the futility of conflict.

== Author ==
Ahmad Dehqan was born in Karaj Province in 1966. He was a soldier in the Iran-Iraq war. He graduated with a degree in electrical engineering in 2007, and then studied Communication Sciences, earning a bachelor's degree. He pursued a master's degree in anthropology, which was his favorite field of study.

Dehgan works as a literary expert in the Office of Literature and the Art of Resistance at the Center for Literary Creations in Howzeh Honari. He wrote several collections of stories and novels including, Untold about The Iran-Iraq War, A Division with four Persons Liberation of Khorramshahr, The Stars of Shalamcheh, The Last Days, The Mission Complete, I am the Murderer of your son, Invasion and Dashtban. Many of Dehqan's books have been published by Soreie Mehr Publication Company and translated into various other languages.

== Awards ==
After the first publication of Journey to Heading 270 Degrees, Dehqan received awards including the 20 Years Literature Story Award, 20 Years Literature Resistance Award and first place in the 4th Sacred Defense Book of The Year award in Iran.

== See also ==
- Chess with the Doomsday Machine
- One Woman's War: Da (Mother)
- Eternal Fragrance
- Noureddin, Son of Iran
- That Which That Orphan Saw
- The Night Bus
- Fortune Told in Blood
- Borunsi
- 23 People
- Baba Nazar (book)
