= Asemane Man =

Iranian television series

Asemane Man (i.e. My Sky) is an Iranian television series in 30 episodes of 45 to 50 minutes each, directed by Mohammad Reza Ahanj. This series is a product of the Owj Arts and Media Organization.

== Story Summary ==
My Sky is a story of a peaceful flight, but to achieve this goal, many people try to reach their destination peacefully and comfortably. In other words, this series is the story of the lives of unpretentious people who wish airplane passengers a happy journey.

The story of the series begins in 1985. According to recorded documents, several planes were hijacked this year, which is depicted in the first six episodes of the story of these hijackings, and then, with a leap of 25 years, it reflects the efforts of the flight security forces (the Islamic Revolutionary Guard Corps) to establish complete security during various flights and neutralize the movements of terrorist groups.

== Writing the series ==
Homan Fazel said about how he wrote the series: "From written documents and interviews with flight security officials, as well as consulting with the director, I was able to write the script for Aseman Man, some of the events in the series were based on reality and others were based on imagination."

== Locations ==
The series was filmed in the cities of Urmia, Bandar Abbas, Khuzestan, Bushehr, Isfahan, and the Netherlands, France, and Ukraine.

== Actors ==
One of the features of this series is the number of actors, which is about 75. Other actors include:

Afshin Zinuri, Hamidreza Ataei, Vida Javan, Ammar Tafti, Shahram Abdoli, Saleh Mirza Aghaei, Chakameh Chamanmah, Amirreza Delavari, Bahram Ebrahimi, Mohammad Omrani, Farokh Nemati, Majid Moshiri, Sirous Kohuri Nejad, Ramsin Kobariti, Amir Kaveh Ahanin Jan, Amir Mohammad Zand, Amir Abbas Mohseni, Rahman Bagherian, Farhad Jam, Asghar Naghizadeh, Atash Taghipour, Zohreh Safavi, Ahmad Kavari, Shiva Khosroumher, Shima Nikpour, Rana Qaisar Nejad, Nayre Farahani, Tabassum Hashemi, Nazafarin Kazemi, Anoush Moazami, Mehdi Saki, Mohammad Mokhtari, Solmaz Hessari, Ahmad Allamehdehr, Arman Suratgar, Ahmad Najafi, Amir Hossein Modarres, Keramat Rudsaz, Bahram Afshari, Ali Ahanj, Abolghasem Mohammad Taher, Roozbeh Moeini, Mohammad Reza Norouz, Narges Amini, Sepehrad Farzami, Khosrow Pesiani, Azadeh Riazi, Peyman Moghaddisi, Farshad Asadollahpour, Parvin Maleki, Masoud Entezari, Sina Karami, Gholam Reza Sadeghi, Safar Kashkuli, Hassan Karimkhan Zand, Nika Khosrowabadi, Mohammad Afravi, Roozbeh Akhtari, Farkhunde Farmanizadeh, Navid Norouz, Majid Abdol Azimi, Mohammad Mehdi Hashemi, Mobina Atashi, Asiyeh Ziaei, Davoud Moqdadi, Roham Tadashidi, Babak Hadipour, Amir Reza Delavari, Raed Tamimi, Mohammad Reza Akbari, Vahid Elhovie, Ali Monfared, Shima Momeni, Ali Reza Mozaffari, Babak Ghaderi, Mohammad Bozorgmehr, Aida Mardi, Arash Kalhor, Mozhgan Raigan, Hamid Nairi, Kaveh Parham, Peyman Darabi, Parichehr Mousavi, Mohammad Reza Ghiyashi, Payam Dadashian, Somayeh Abbaszadeh, Ahmad Sarafraz, Ahmad Shojaei, Ebrahim Eqbalfar, Ali Arnavazi, Iraj Yavarifard, Hossein Ghorbani, Ahmad Madadi, Maryam Masoudi, Ardavan Shabestari, Leila Azizi, Amir Hossein Asefi, Saeed Ahanj, Ali Abbasi...
