= Stabbing of Salman Rushdie =

2022 attack in Chautauqua, New York, United States

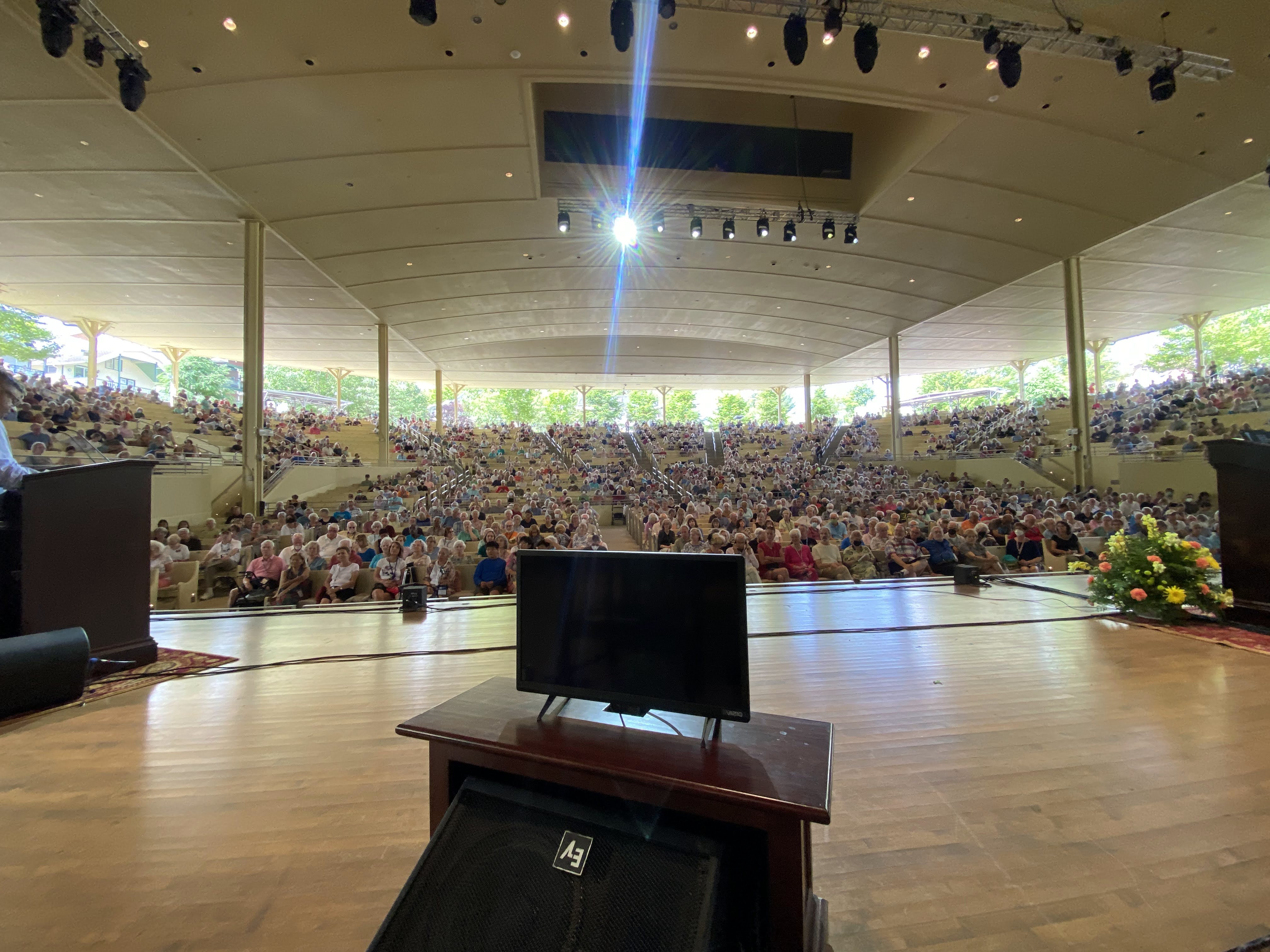
- Amphitheater stage where the attack occurred, as seen on July 20, 2022
- Location: 42°12′30″N 79°27′51″W; Chautauqua Amphitheater, Chautauqua Institution, in Chautauqua, New York, U.S.
- Date: August 12, 2022; 4 years ago c. 10:47 am (EDT)
- Target: Salman Rushdie
- Attack type: Stabbing
- Deaths: 0
- Injuries: 2 (including Rushdie)
- Perpetrator: Hadi Matar
- Motive: Shia Islamic extremism (possible attempted realization of fatwa against Rushdie)
- Charges: Attempt to Provide Material Support to a Foreign Terrorist Organization; Act of Terrorism Transcending National Boundaries; Providing Material Support to Terrorists
- Convictions: Attempted second-degree murder; second-degree assault

On August 12, 2022, Indian-born British-American novelist Salman Rushdie was stabbed multiple times by 24-year-old Hadi Matar as he was about to give a public lecture at the Chautauqua Institution in Chautauqua, New York, United States. Matar was immediately arrested and charged the following day with assault and attempted murder. Rushdie was gravely wounded and hospitalized. Interviewer Henry Reese was also injured by the attacker.

Rushdie had been threatened with death since 1989, a year after the publication of his novel The Satanic Verses, when the Iranian supreme leader Ayatollah Ruhollah Khomeini issued a fatwa calling for his assassination, and set a bounty of $3 million for his death. For years, Rushdie had lived in hiding, taking strict security measures that gradually became more relaxed over time.

The government of Iran denied having foreknowledge of the stabbing, although state-controlled agencies of the Iranian media celebrated it. U.S. law enforcement investigated whether the assailant was in contact with other extremists.

Rushdie's memoir about the attack, Knife: Meditations After an Attempted Murder, was released on April 16, 2024. In February 2025, Matar was convicted of attempted second-degree murder and second-degree assault and was sentenced in May 2025 to 25 years in prison.

== Background ==
Salman Rushdie had been living under threat of assassination since 1989. The Satanic Verses, his fourth novel, garnered critical acclaim but was controversial, receiving threats from hardliner Shia Muslims upon its 1988 publication. Ayatollah Khomeini, the Supreme Leader of Iran at the time, issued a 1989 fatwa calling for Rushdie's assassination, forcing Rushdie into hiding for several years. Hitoshi Igarashi, who translated The Satanic Verses in Japanese, was stabbed to death in July 1991. Ten days before, the book's Italian translator Ettore Capriolo was stabbed multiple times at his home in Milan.

The Execution of Imam Khomeini's Order set a US$3 million bounty on Rushdie, with the 15 Khordad Foundation offering to pay it. The bounty against Rushdie has never been lifted, though in 1998, the government of Iran looked to distance itself from the fatwa and pledged no longer to urge that it be carried out. In 2017, however, the Supreme Leader of Iran, Ayatollah Ali Khamenei, reaffirmed that the edict remained in effect, saying, "The decree is as Imam Khomeini issued."

In the years prior to the stabbing, Rushdie traveled without a security detail, and the Chautauqua festival where he was speaking was known for its "accessible" and "relaxed environment". Two weeks before he was stabbed, Rushdie told German current affairs magazine Stern that "nowadays my life is very normal again", and that social media would have made his life "more dangerous, infinitely more dangerous" had it existed in the 1980s. According to the co-founder of City of Asylum, Henry Reese (who was scheduled to interview Rushdie), the novelist had promised him just before they went onstage together that he would tour the United States to create new opportunities for the asylum and protection of persecuted artists.

Rushdie recalled experiencing a vivid dream of being stabbed in an ancient Roman amphitheatre two nights before the actual stabbing occurred. The intensity of the dream caused him to consider canceling his lecture at the Chautauqua Institution until he eventually decided to attend.

== Attack ==
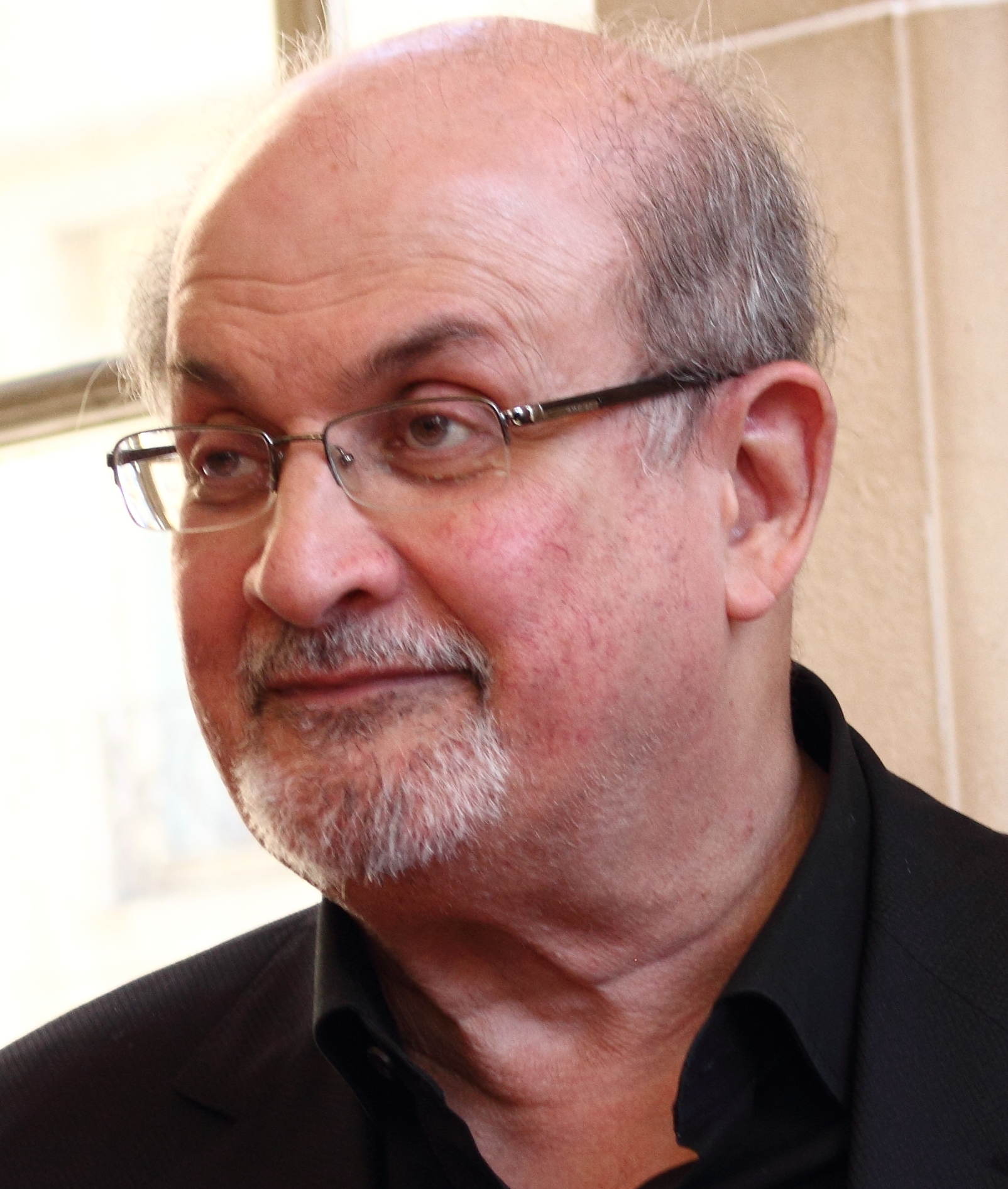
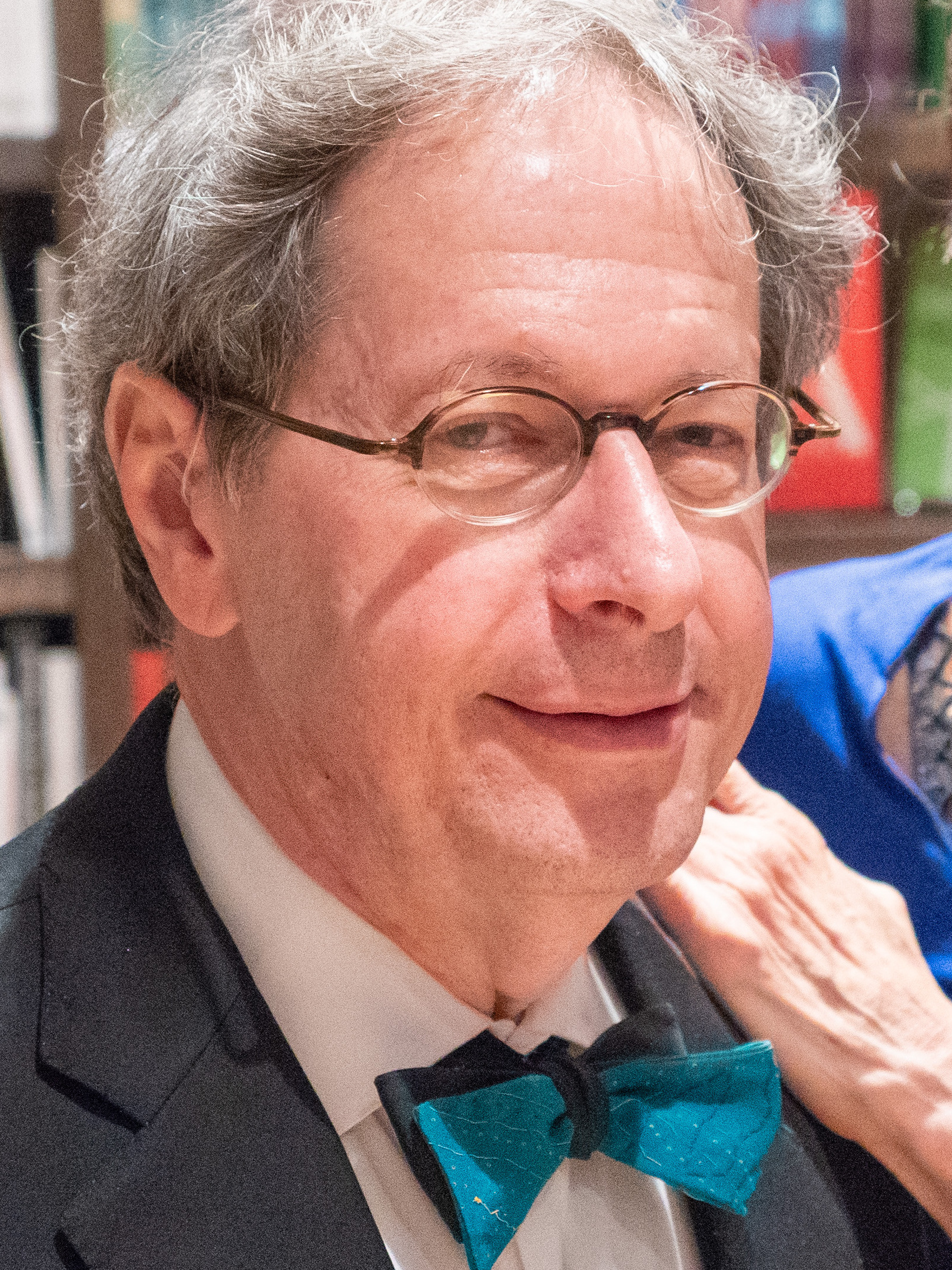
Salman Rushdie (left) and Henry Reese (right) were injured.

On August 12, 2022 at around 10:47 a.m. EDT, an attacker rushed the stage of Chautauqua Institution, where Rushdie was about to give a talk about the United States as a safe haven for exiled writers. The assailant stabbed him fifteen times with a knife, straining to continue the attack even as several people held him back. One of these people was the co-founder of City of Asylum, Henry Reese, onstage at the time, about to begin interviewing Rushdie. During the assault, Reese sustained a shallow knife wound and deep bruising in the vicinity of his right eye. A doctor who was present for the lecture immediately tended to Rushdie. Associated Press reporter Joshua Goodman was present during the attack.

A New York state trooper and a sheriff's deputy who were present at the event arrested the assailant Hadi Matar, a 24-year-old man from Fairview, New Jersey, directly. Both Rushdie and Reese were sent directly to hospitals for treatment.

== Injuries and recovery ==
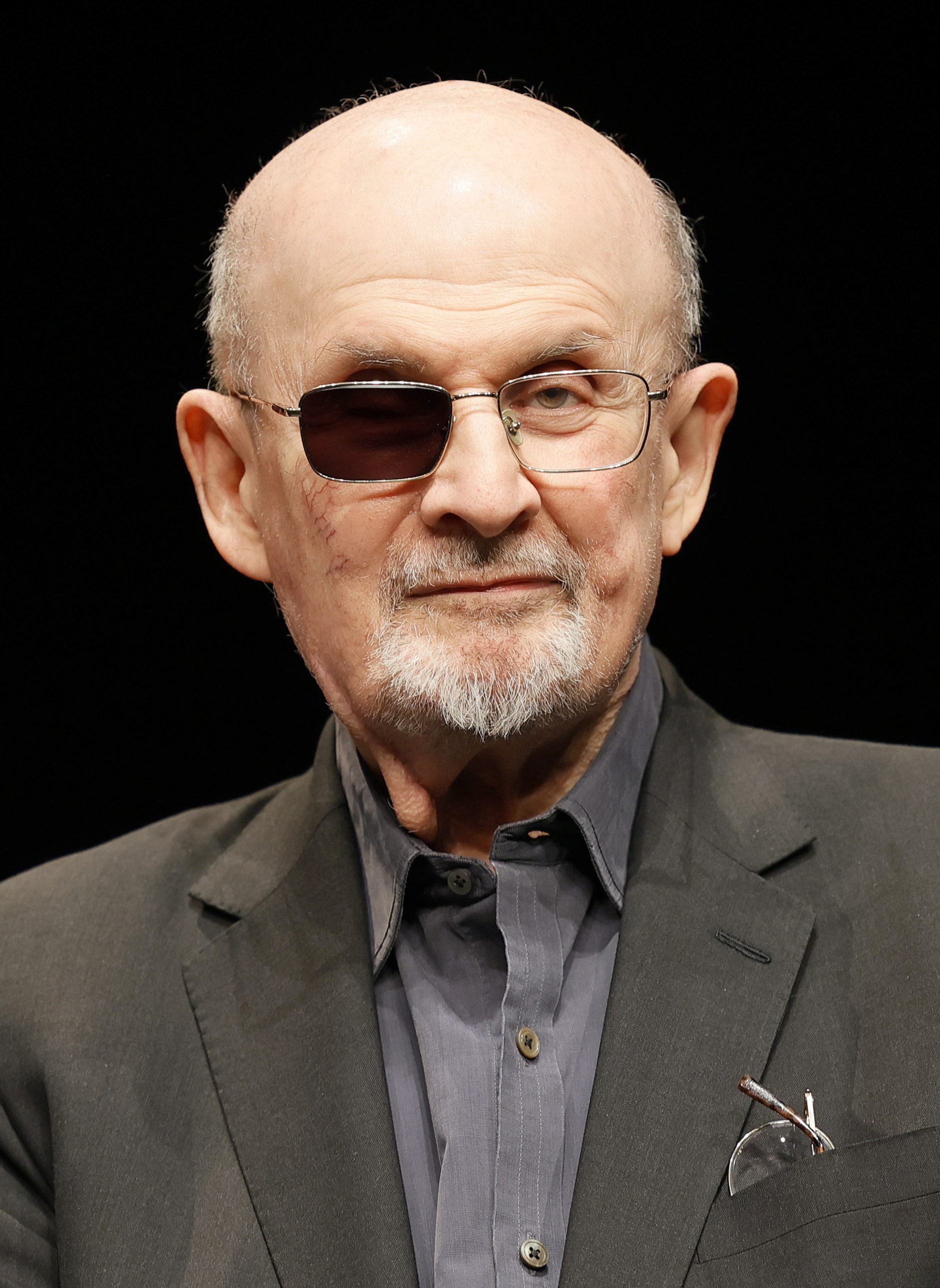
Rushdie two years after the stabbing, wearing a darkened lens to cover his injured eye

Rushdie suffered four wounds to the stomach area of his abdomen, three wounds to the right side of the front part of his neck, one wound to his right eye, one wound to his chest and one wound to his right thigh. He was flown by helicopter to UPMC Hamot, a tertiary-level hospital in Erie, Pennsylvania.

The novelist's literary agent, Andrew Wylie, said on the evening of August 12 that Rushdie had undergone surgery, was on a ventilator, and was unable to speak. Wylie said that Rushdie faced the prospect of losing one of his eyes, in addition to the possibility of liver damage and multiple severed nerves in one arm. On August 13, Wylie said that Rushdie had been taken off the ventilator and was able to speak and joke.

On August 14, Wylie said that Rushdie was on the "road to recovery", adding, "it will be long; the injuries are severe, but his condition is headed in the right direction." Rushdie's son Zafar said, "Though his life-changing injuries are severe, his usual feisty and defiant sense of humour remains intact".

On October 23, Wylie reported that Rushdie had lost sight in one eye and the use of one hand.

By February 6, 2023, Rushdie had recovered enough to appear in an interview with The New Yorker. Speaking about surviving the attack, he stated: "I'm lucky. What I really want to say is that my main overwhelming feeling is gratitude."

== Criminal investigation and prosecution ==
The investigation into Rushdie's stabbing was led by the New York State Police, with assistance from the Federal Bureau of Investigation and Chautauqua County's district attorney.

=== State charges and trial ===
The suspect, Hadi Matar, was charged in New York state court days later with both attempted second-degree murder and second-degree assault, and was remanded without bail. In August 2022, Matar pleaded not guilty. In February 2025, a jury was chosen at the Chautauqua County Courthouse. Matar entered the courtroom and twice declared "Free Palestine". After opening statements were made, witnesses, including Rushdie himself, began testifying. On February 21, 2025, Matar was found guilty on both the attempted murder and assault charges. On May 16, 2025, Matar was sentenced to 25 years in prison for attempted murder, plus 7 years concurrent for injuring another person.

=== Federal charges ===
In July 2024, Matar was indicted and charged in the Federal District Court for the Western District of New York with three crimes: Attempt to Provide Material Support to a Foreign Terrorist Organization; Act of Terrorism Transcending National Boundaries; and Providing Material Support to Terrorists. Attorney General Merrick Garland stated that Matar's attempt to kill Rushdie was "an act of terrorism in the name of Hezbollah", a designated Foreign Terrorist Organization (FTO). The indictment alleged that Matar was trying to carry out the Iranian fatwa calling for the death of Rushdie, and that he was influenced by a 2006 speech which endorsed it, given by Hezbollah's secretary-general, Hassan Nasrallah.

Matar's federal trial opened at a court in Buffalo on July 22, 2026.

=== Perpetrator ===
Hadi Matar, born 1997 or 1998 (age 28–29), is a dual national, a citizen of both the U.S. and Lebanon. He was born in California to parents who emigrated from Yaroun, a mixed Shia-Christian village in the south of Lebanon where support for Hezbollah and the Iranian government is common. Matar's father returned to his cinder-block home in Yaroun several years before the attack, and his mother and her three children had recently moved from California to New Jersey. She told the MailOnline that, after a 2018 trip to Lebanon to visit his father, Matar had changed, growing increasingly isolated and focused on his Islamic faith.

A source in law enforcement told local news that Matar's social media accounts indicated support for the Islamic Revolutionary Guard Corps and Shia extremism. The New York Post, referencing law enforcement, reported that Matar expressed views in support of the Iranian government. Matar was carrying a false driver's license using the same second name as that of the assassinated Hezbollah leader, Imad Mughniyeh. Matar obtained an advance pass to attend the event.

Matar told the New York Post in an interview that he was surprised Rushdie survived. He added that he read only "a couple pages" of The Satanic Verses, but disliked Rushdie due to his criticism of Islam; Matar also watched videos of the author on YouTube. Matar refused to say whether he attacked Rushdie because of the fatwa against him, though Matar said he respected Khomeini, who issued it.

== Response ==
=== United States ===
A spokesperson for U.S. President Joe Biden issued a statement condemning the attack. United States Secretary of State Antony Blinken vowed to use "every appropriate tool at our disposal" in response, and described Iran as culpable. He pointed out that "Iranian state institutions have incited violence against Rushdie for generations, and state-affiliated media recently gloated about the attempt on his life." He called their behavior "despicable".

On August 19, a public reading of Rushdie's works organized by PEN America was held outside the New York Public Library's Main Branch with many prominent writers taking part, including Paul Auster, Kiran Desai, Roya Hakakian, Aasif Mandvi, and Gay Talese. People unable to attend were urged to hold similar "Stand with Salman" events in their areas.

Rushdie's son Zafar wrote "Free speech is the whole thing, the whole ball game. Free speech is life itself." There were also calls by Muslim activists to condemn the attacker, not Islam or Muslims in general.

On September 14, the Wall Street Journal reported that the "Biden administration is considering sanctions targeting entities linked to Iran for encouraging attacks on Salman Rushdie." The newspaper reported that "U.S. officials say elements of the Iranian regime are liable because of their support for the fatwa" against Rushdie.

=== Iran ===
The government of Iran officially denied any involvement in the attack against Rushdie. According to The Guardian, senior officials in Iran linked the stabbing to nuclear talks between Iran and the United States. Iranian-American political analyst Mohammad Marandi, a member of Iran's nuclear negotiations team, wrote: "I won't be shedding tears for a writer who spouts endless hatred & contempt for Muslims & Islam." Marandi also alluded to a conspiracy theory suggesting that the action reflected an attempt by Iran's enemies to harm its image, writing "is it a coincidence that just when we are on the verge of revitalising the nuclear agreement, America makes claims about an attempted assassination of Bolton and then this happens?" Marandi's statement referenced the United States Department of Justice's allegation that Iran had planned to assassinate US national security advisor John Bolton in 2020.

The 15 Khordad Foundation, which had offered to pay the bounty on Rushdie, was silent after the attack and did not respond to press inquiries.

Within Iran, conservative newspapers generally welcomed the attack, as well as the state broadcaster (who referred to Rushdie as an apostate), while reformist publications such as Etemad condemned it.

=== Other nations ===
British Prime Minister Boris Johnson, Australian Prime Minister Anthony Albanese, French President Emmanuel Macron, Canadian Prime Minister Justin Trudeau and German Chancellor Olaf Scholz also issued statements of outrage over the attack and expressed well-wishes for Rushdie.

Among Indian politicians who condemned the attack were Kerala Governor Arif Mohammad Khan, Shashi Tharoor and Karti Chidambaram of the Indian National Congress, Communist Party of India (Marxist) general secretary Sitaram Yechury, Communist Party of India (Marxist–Leninist) leader Kavita Krishnan and Shiv Sena MP Priyanka Chaturvedi.

In Lebanon, Iran-backed Hezbollah denied any prior knowledge of the incident. However, Hezbollah supporters hailed the attacker on social media, calling him a hero, and using the hashtag "holy stabbing" in their posts.

Imran Khan, former Prime Minister of Pakistan, said, "You can't justify what happened" in response to the stabbing.

== Cultural effect ==
The CEO of PEN America commented, "We cannot immediately think of any comparable incident of a public violent attack on a writer during a literary event here in the United States." The New York Times reported that the incident sent "ripples of 'shock and horror' through the literary world". Nobel laureates Kazuo Ishiguro and Abdulrazak Gurnah were among the first to issue statements defending Rushdie, while his fellow Booker Prize winners Ian McEwan and Arundhati Roy also condemned the stabbing. Shortly afterwards, other Booker Prize winners, such as Graham Swift, Margaret Atwood and Ben Okri, would also publish their responses to Rushdie's stabbing. The home page of the Booker Prize's website was also updated to reflect the attack on its "most decorated author" and the website also published an article—written by the Booker Prize Foundation's literary director Gaby Wood—urging people to "celebrate his limitless imagination and his impact on the literary landscape". The British Library and Bodleian Library held events where prominent authors read from Rushdie's works in solidarity with him.

On the day of the attack, Islamic studies expert Kylie Moore-Gilbert wrote: "More than 30 years and a $3 million bounty later, Khomeini's poisonous fatwa has finally caught up with Salman Rushdie. A black day for freedoms of speech, expression, religion & conscience. A tragic day for literature." Behrouz Boochani, an Iranian journalist in exile, condemned the stabbing of Rushdie, calling it an "attack on freedom of speech". Hanif Kureishi declared that "The Satanic Verses is the rude contrary of the authoritarian lie". Musician Cat Stevens, who had made comments seemingly endorsing violence against Rushdie in 1989, released a statement on social media condemning the attack and wishing Rushdie a full recovery.

Paul Tighe, secretary of the Pontifical Council for Culture, spoke in support of Rushdie as he opened an exhibition the day after the attack.

Two days after Rushdie was stabbed, France's Goncourt Academy issued a statement in which it said it "condemns the barbaric act for which there can be no justification... [and] offers its unconditional support and solidarity" to Rushdie. In Le Monde the editors of Charlie Hebdo used an op-ed to express solidarity, and 200 well-known figures of Tunisian, Algerian, Moroccan and North African origin denounced the attack in a letter.

The Royal Society of Literature, of which Rushdie is a fellow, was criticised for not publicly supporting Rushdie in response to the attack. When President Bernardine Evaristo wrote on the issue of free speech in 2024 that the society "cannot take sides in writers' controversies and issues", Rushdie commented on X: "Just wondering if the Royal Society of Literature is 'impartial' about attempted murder?"

=== Books ===
The assault on Rushdie resulted in renewed interest in obtaining copies of The Satanic Verses, with the novel ranked number thirteen on Amazon.com by the afternoon after he was stabbed. Within days, the novel's Spanish translation was a number one bestseller and other books written by Rushdie, including Midnight's Children, were also selling well, whereas on the day he was stabbed, his books were outside the top 100.

=== Memoir ===
Rushdie's memoir about the attack, Knife: Meditations After an Attempted Murder, was released on April 16, 2024.

== Security at the Chautauqua Institution ==
Questions were raised after the stabbing of Rushdie about security at the event. Chautauqua Institution President Michael Hill said that security needs for events were determined on a case-by-case basis, and described the assault on Rushdie as "unlike anything in [the institution's] nearly 150-year history". Although a state trooper and a sheriff's officer were present at the event, one eyewitness stated that there was no visible security on or around the stage preventing unauthorized people from stepping onto the stage. Another attendee noted that while food and drinks were prevented from being brought into the event, there was no screening for weapons.

CNN, citing two anonymous sources, reported that the leadership of the Chautauqua Institution disregarded recommendations for security precautions because they felt it would alienate the audience from the speakers. Following the attack, the instititution announced that it would require guests to furnish photo IDs to buy gate passes, which previously could be purchased anonymously, and that carried bags would be banned in the amphitheater.

== See also ==
- 2022 in literature
- 2024 Wakeley church stabbing
