= Karo (2019 film) =

2019 film directed by Ahmad Morad Pour

- کارو
- Directed by: Ahmad Moradpour
- Produced by: Hossein Saberi
- Starring: Marila Zarei; Peyman Moghaddam; Habib Payandeh; Hamed Ahmadjoo
- Production company: Owj Arts and Media organization
- Release date: 2019
- Running time: 92 minutes
- Country: Iran
- Language: Persian

Karo is an Iranian film directed by Ahmad Moradpour, written by Fahimeh Soleimani and produced by Hossein Saberi, released in 2019. The film was featured in the 39th Fajr Film Festival. The film is a product of the Owj Arts and Media Organization. The film Karo is about the Iran-Iraq War, but due to the difficult filming conditions in the mountainous region of Ardabil Province and adverse weather conditions, it was unable to participate in last year's festival.

== Story Summary ==
The film Karo tells the story of a teenage wrestler from Kermanshah named Karo, who, after years of effort and training, is invited to the national wrestling team. In the face of life's hardships and numerous obstacles, he relies on the unwavering support of his devoted and selfless mother. By combining an emotional narrative with a sports theme, the film attempts to portray the complexities of human and family relationships. Karo faces various difficulties amidst the turmoil of life, and his mother plays a pivotal role in supporting him. Throughout this journey, the mother remains supportive of her son and confronts every challenge that comes her way.

== Screening ==
The online screening of this film began in January 2025. The film was made available on the platforms Hashour, Rubika, Apra, Shad, Tamasha Khooneh, and Cinema Samarh. The online screening has allowed audiences to watch the film from anywhere in Iran.

== Cast ==
- Merila Zarei
- Peyman Moghaddam
- Habib Payandeh
- Hamed Ahmadjoo
- Morteza Shahkaram
- Esmail Movahedi
- Hamidreza Hejabizadeh
- Peyman Nouri
- Mojtaba Hosseini
- Shabbo Soleimani
- Zhiar Mohammadzadeh
- Elena Bashang
