= Davud Ghaffarzadegan =

Iranian writer, teacher and novelist

داوود غفارزادگان Davud Ghaffarzadegan
- Born: October 2, 1959 (age 66); Ardebil, Iran
- Education: Ardebil Elementary Teacher's College
- Occupation: Author
- Writing career
- Language: Persian
- Notable works: Fortune Told in Blood "We're three"
- Notable awards: The 20 Years Literature Story Award; A Quarter Century of Sacred Defense Books
- Website: ghaffarzadegan.blogfa.com

Davud Ghaffarzadegan (Persian: داوود غفارزادگان) is an Iranian author and novelist. His war novel, Fortune Told in Blood, has been translated into English. He has written more than two decades for people of all ages.

== Personal life ==
Ghaffarzadegan was born in Ardebil on October 2, 1959, and finished his studies at Ardebil Elementary Teacher's College in 1977. He worked as a teacher and taught in the villages of Ardabil. His first work was published in 1980. He moved to Tehran in 1988 and worked in an educational publishing office. He is now retired and lives in Tehran.

== Bibliography ==
Ghaffarzadegan has written stories on various topics for a diverse audience over two decades. He was awarded The 20 Years Literature Story Award based on his work "We're three". His novel, Fortune Told in Blood was published by the University of Texas America. This book won an award at the A Quarter Century of Sacred Defense Books festival in the novel category.

=== Children and adolescents ===
- Little pilot\Khalaban Koochooloo\ Children's story
- Sang Andazan-e Ghar-e Kabood\ Adolescent's novel
- Midnight singing\Avaz-e Nime Shab\ Adolescent's novel
- Flying cranes\Parvaz-e Dornaha\ Adolescent's novel
- Eight old heroes and seven young men\ Hasht Pahlavan-e Pir Haft Pesar-e Javan\ Adolescent's story
- Winter on the way\Zemestan dar raah
- Pigeons and daggers\Kabutar haa va khanjar haa
- Uninvited guests\Mehmaane nakhande
- Good and bad\Khubo bad
- Blue whale tale\Gheseye nahanghaa
- Stone monster\Ghule sangi
- A story of an unfinished painting/Gheseye naghashie naa tamaam
- A flower for the green stem\Goli baraye sagheye sabz
- Palm trees and spears\Nakhlaa va neyzehaa
- Pigeon are born in the crate\Kabutar haa dar ghafas be donya miayand
- Lost snowman\Adam barfie gom shode
- Yek matal, se afsane
- Blue crow/Kalaghe aabi
- Curly hair/Moo ferferi
- Crows also die/kalagh haa ham mimirand
- Centipede/Hezar paa
- Why is rooster tail short?/Chera dome khorus kutah ast
- Red flower and the plant/gole sorkh va giahe baadgard
- Mad hero/Pahlevan divane sar

=== Adults ===
- Fortune told in blood\Fal-e Khoon\ Novel\ translated into English in 2008 under the title Fortune Told in Blood
- Ayub at night\Shab-e Ayyub\ Long story
- Shadows and the long night\Sayeha va Shab-e Deraz\ Long story
- We are three\Ma Se Nafar Hastim\ Collected stories
- The mystery of Mr. Mir's death/Raz-e Ghatl-e Agha Mir\Collected stories
- Frightened girls/Dokhtaran-e Delriz\ Collected stories
- An unnamed confession book/Ketab-e Bi Nam-e Eterafat\ Novel
- Standing under high voltage power lines/Istadan Zir-e Dakal-e Bargh-e Feshar-e Ghavi\ Collected stories
- Havayi digar
- Derakhte jaru
- Ta az sokjhan door nayoftim
- Nightmare House/Kabuskhaneh
- A man that God wanted him dead/Mardi ke khoda dustdasht oo ra koshte bebinad
