= God of War (2025 film) =

- Directed by: Hossein Darabi
- Written by: Ehsan Saghafi
- Produced by: Saeed Saadi
- Starring: Saed Soheili; Dariush Kardan; Hossein Soleimani; Payam Ahmadinia
- Production company: Owj Arts and Media Organization
- Distributed by: Hozeh Honari
- Release date: 31 January 2025 (Fajr Film Festival)
- Country: Iran
- Language: Persian

God of War is an Iranian film produced in 2024, by Owj Arts and Media Organization directed by Hossein Darabi and produced by Saeed Saadi.

== Synopsis ==
This film, written by Ehsan Saghafi, depicts a sensitive narrative of a historical and important contemporary event in the Iran–Iraq War, centered on Hassan Tehrani Moghaddam. The character of Hassan Tehrani Moghaddam is not directly present in the film, and the event is narrated from the perspective of one of his comrades (played by Saed Soheili).

== Unveiling ==
On the eve of the 43rd Fajr International Film Festival, the poster for the movie "God of War" designed by Mohammad Shakiba was unveiled.

== Actors ==
- Saed Soheili
- Dariush Kardan
- Hossein Soleimani
- Payam Ahmadinia
- Nader Fallah
- Seyed Mehdi Hosseini
- Mehdi Farizeh
- Daniel Noroush
- Peyman Pornikdest
- Ali Delpishe
- Azadeh Seifi
- Abdolreza Nassari
- Bahar Davarzani
- Mohammadreza Sarvestani
- Hooman Darabi
- Ahmad Yavari
- Kobri Goodarzi
- Ammar Shalagh

== Location ==
The filming of this movie was done in the "Sacred Defense Cinema City". Then the movie entered the technical stages and was placed on the editing table.
