= Joshua Goodman =

American journalist

Joshua Goodman is an American journalist with the Associated Press (AP) known for his coverage of Latin America. He has significant experience reporting on economic and political issues in the region. He is the news director for the Andean region for the AP and has held this position since 2016. He previously served as AP chief of bureau for Colombia, Venezuela and Panama.

In 2023, Goodman was awarded a Maria Moors Cabot Gold Medal from the Columbia School of Journalism for his storytelling from Latin America. Goodman has received grants from the Pulitzer Center for reporting.

== Early life and education ==
Born in Cleveland, Ohio, Goodman studied European history at Columbia University.

== Career ==
Goodman began his journalism career as a correspondent for Business Week in Buenos Aires and freelanced for the Boston Globe and the Financial Times, among others.

=== Bloomberg News ===
In 2008, Goodman joined Bloomberg News, where he served as a chief editor for Latin America. He oversaw coverage of economics and politics and conducted notable investigations, such as the one on China's financial support for Hugo Chavez's re-election campaign in the 2012 Venezuelan presidential election.

=== Associated Press ===
Goodman rejoined the AP in 2013 as the bureau chief for Colombia, Venezuela, and Panama. He reported on a proposal by major U.S. corporations to hide import data crucial for tracing labor abuses in global supply chains. His reporting led to significant public and legislative reactions. In 2019, he interviewed Nicolás Maduro, which was his first-ever interview with an English-language news agency.

In 2022, Goodman witnessed the stabbing of author Salman Rushdie during a lecture at the Chautauqua Institution in New York on August 12. Goodman reported that the attacker, Hadi Matar, rushed the stage and stabbed Rushdie approximately 10 to 15 times. The incident occurred while Rushdie was being introduced to discuss the United States as a refuge for exiled writers and artists. The attack left Rushdie with serious injuries.

He investigated the 2020 failed coup attempt in Venezuela led by Canadian-American former Green Beret Jordan Goudreau. This story revealed the complexities of the plot and its international implications. He has continued to follow the story. He reported on the 2024 Venezuelan presidential election.
