= A City Under Siege =

2000 book by Habib Ahmadzadeh

A City Under Siege: Tales of the Iran–Iraq War
- Author: Habib Ahmadzadeh
- Translator: Paul Sprachman
- Language: Persian
- Publisher: Sureye Mehr Publication, Mazda Publishers
- Publication date: 2000
- ISBN: 978-1568592558

A City Under Siege: Tales of the Iran–Iraq War (2000) (ISBN 978-1568592558) is a collection of nine stories from the Iran–Iraq War by Habib Ahmadzadeh, an Iranian author. The book won awards in Iran and was called one of the top twenty books about the Iran–Iraq War. The book was initially published in 2000 by Sureye Mehr Publication in Persian. Paul Sprachman, a professor at Rutgers University, translated the book from Persian into English and Mazda Publishers published it in 2010.

== Contents ==
A City under Siege consists of these novelettes:

1. "Eagle Feather"
2. "The Airplane"
3. "An Umbrella for the Director"
4. "Thirty-nine Plus One Prisoners"
5. "The Fleeing of the Warrior"
6. "A Letter to the Sa'ad Family"
7. "If There Were No Darya Qoli"
8. "Vengeance"
9. "Neneh"

== Reception ==
On behalf of Complete Review, M.A. Orthofer wrote,

Ahmadzadeh tries to make a connection with the reader in A City Under Siege. Most stories are told in the first person. A City Under Siege is a solid collection of wartime stories. Ahmadzadeh relies heavily on certain tricks and has a few authorial tics, but he's a talented writer, and these are effective, good stories. This collection is certainly a good introduction to frontline Iranian life during this conflict (with which most Western readers will presumably not yet be very familiar.

The book was also reviewed in the Middle East Studies Association of North America's Review of Middle East Studies by Hamid Eshani.

Habib Ahmadzadeh received the third prize of the Writing Forge Short Story Competition for his "Letter to the Sa'ad Family".

== See also ==
- Chess with the Doomsday Machine
- Persepolis (banned in Iran)
