= Foundation of Martyrs and Veterans Affairs =

Iranian foundation for supporting martyrs and veterans economically

Flag of Foundation of Martyrs and Veterans Affairs

The Foundation of Martyrs and Veterans Affairs (Persian: بنیاد شهید و امور ایثارگران Bonyad Shahid va Omur-e Ithargaran) is an Iranian foundation that receives its funding directly from the national budget. Ahmad Mousavi is the current director of the organization. The Foundation gives home loans to disabled veterans and to the families of soldiers killed in action, who in Iran are considered martyrs (shaheedan). It has reportedly loaned 120 million rials to urban families and 150 million rials to rural families. The Foundation is also involved in numerous economic endeavors, much like the Mostazafen Foundation of Islamic Revolution.

== Economic activity ==
The Foundations economic activity includes participation in a joint venture with the Industrial Development and Renovation Organization and Iran Electronics Industries' Defense Ministry subsidiary, the Iran Electronic Development Company. In March 2004, this company was part of a consortium that won a mobile-phone license from the Iranian government, but the deal fell through because of political objections.

== See also ==
- Bonyad
- Economy of Iran
- Iranian Economic Reform Plan
- IRGC
- Banking in Iran
- Foundation for the Preservation and Publication of Sacred Defense Works and Values
