= Chess with the Doomsday Machine =

Novel by Habib Ahmadzadeh

Chess with the Doomsday Machine (Persian: شطرنج با ماشین قیامت)
- First edition
- Author: Habib Ahmadzadeh
- Translator: Paul Sprachman
- Language: English
- Published: 2008, Mazda Publishers
- Publication place: US
- Media type: Book
- Pages: xviii + 268
- ISBN: 1568592159

Chess with the Doomsday Machine (Shatranj ba Mashin-e Qiamat) (Persian: شطرنج با ماشین قیامت) is a novel about the Iran–Iraq War by Habib Ahmadzadeh. In 1980, an attack on the Iranian city of Abadan marked the beginning of the Iran-Iraq war. Hundreds of thousands of people fled the badly damaged city but a small number of civilians chose to stay, living in a city under siege. The story focuses on the experiences of Moosa, a young Abadani soldier defending his home town. He has been chosen to assist in destroying the enemy's "Doomsday Machine", a sophisticated radar system.

== Publisher ==
The book was written in 1996 and published in Persian by Soreie Mehr Publication Company in 2005. Chess with the Doomsday Machine has been nominated for and received numerous awards, and has been reprinted many times in Iran. According to critics, Chess with the Doomsday Machine is one of the most prominent novels about the Iran–Iraq War in recent years. In 2008, the book was translated from Persian into English by Paul Sprachman, a professor at Rutgers University, and published by Mazda Publishers.

== The novel ==
The "Doomsday Machine" of the title is the nickname given to a Cymbeline counter-battery radar system used by the Iraqi military to direct counter-battery fire against Iranian artillery. Moosa, the protagonist of the novel, becomes an artillery spotter in the duel between the two sides, using an unfinished multi-storey building as his observation post. A native Abadani, Moosa is also assigned to guard the few remaining civilians who choose to remain in the city during the Siege of Abadan.

== Onelight Theatre adaptation ==
In 2012 Onelight Theatre decided to stage an adaptation of the Iranian novel. Onelight Theatre is a professional theatre company that has been developing and producing works in Halifax, Nova Scotia since 2002. Located at Alderney Landing, Onelight is the resident theatre company at the complex. After returning home from representing Canada at the Fadjr International Theatre Festival in Tehran, the show made its Canadian premiere on February 6, 2014. The production returned to Canada after first touring ran, with a debut in Abadan, the birthplace of the story and that of Onelight Theatre's artistic director, Shahin Sayadi. "Taking this work to stage in the place it all started, my hometown, has truly been an honour", said Sayadi. "I'm looking forward to bringing it home to Canada next month." Written and directed by Shahin Sayadi, Chess with the Doomsday Machine used a combination of English, Persian and nonverbal communication to tell the story of the challenges a young soldier must face.

The production was revived at Alderney Landing, for a run between January 19 to February 7, 2015.

== Awards ==
- Literary Award of Esfehan
- Year Book of Sacred Defense
- Year Book of Press Association of Writers and Critics
- Golden Pen Award of Iran
- Year Book of Islamic Republic of Iran

== See also ==
- One Woman's War: Da (Mother)
- Noureddin, Son of Iran
- The Night Bus
- That Which That Orphan Saw
- Eternal Fragrance
- Fortune Told in Blood
- Journey to Heading 270 Degrees
- I'm Alive
- Baba Nazar
