= Eternal Fragrance =

2003 memoir by Masoumeh Ramhormozi

Eternal Fragrance, Last Sunday
- First edition (Persian)
- Author: Masoumeh Ramhormozi
- Translator: Farahnaz Omidvar
- Language: Persian, English, Arabic
- Genre: Memoir
- Publisher: Sureye Mehr Publication
- Publication date: 2003
- Publication place: Iran
- Media type: Book
- Pages: 242
- ISBN: 978-600-331-021-6

Eternal Fragrance (Persian: یکشنبه آخر, "Last Sunday") is a book written by Masoumeh Ramhormozi about the Iran–Iraq war (1980–88). Masoumeh, who was 14 at the time, was a social worker in a field hospital during the war. The English translation of The Last Sunday, titled Eternal Fragrance, was launched at the 66th Frankfurt Book Fair. This book discusses some of the roles of Iranian women who participated in the Iran-Iraq war. Eternal Fragrance was ranked the second book in the 9th Sacred Defense Book of the year awards.

According to critics, Eternal Fragrance is the most effective memoir of the Iran–Iraq war. It is one of the first published works about Iranian women's roles during this period, which paved the way for the publication of similar works. The original book was translated into English by Farahnaz Omidvar.

== Background ==
Masoumeh Ramhormozi, a native of southern Iran, was 14 in 1980 when the Iran-Iraq war broke out. She was raised in a religious family that was active during and after the Iranian Revolution. Masoumeh was a social worker in a field hospital. Her brothers were killed in the war, and she has said that moment was the hardest of the war for her. Ramhormozi had a notebook that wrote her memoirs for her peace of mind and sometimes tore them up.

== Narrative ==
Eternal Fragrance is mainly about the memories of Masoumeh Ramhormozi, a woman fighter whose father and brothers were killed during the Iran-Iraq war. At the start of the book, she states: "I wrote major event in a notebook every day for peace of my heart and sometimes teared up my handwritten". She kept the notes and used them to write her memoirs and said, "I write [my] own memories today for reading with other people, not for my heart". This book consists of 12 chapters, a picture gallery, and documents about major events during the Iran-Iraq war.

== Publication ==
The book was first published in Persian as The Last Sunday by Sureye Mehr Publication Company in 2003. The original book was translated into English by Farahnaz Omidvar, and the English translation was later sent to England for editing. The English version, titled Eternal Fragrance, was launched at the 66th Frankfurt Book Fair.

== See also ==
- Iran–Iraq War
- Liberation of Khorramshahr
- Battle of Khorramshahr
- Mohammad Jahanara
- Noureddin, Son of Iran
- One Woman's War: Da (Mother)
- Persepolis (banned in Iran)
- List of Iranian commanders in the Iran–Iraq War
- That Which That Orphan Saw
- Chess with the doomsday machine
- Fortune Told in Blood
- Journey to Heading 270 Degrees
- Baba Nazar (book)
