= The Holy Cast =

- Directed by: Mohammad Amin Hamedani
- Written by: Hooman Fazel
- Produced by: Mohammad Amin Hamedani
- Edited by: Mohammad Amin Hamedani
- Music by: Behzad Abdi
- Production company: Owj Art Organization
- Release date: November 30, 2017
- Running time: 80 minutes
- Country: Iran
- Language: Persian

The Holy Cast (Persian: فهرست مقدس) is an Iranian animation film directed by Mohammad Amin Hamedani and written by Hooman Fazel, commissioned by the Owj Arts and Media Organization, and released in cinemas in the country in 2017. This animation is based on a true story.

== Synopsis ==
The story of "The Holy Cast" takes place about a century before Islam, in the city of Najran, a place near the border of Saudi Arabia and Yemen, where they convert to Christianity at the invitation of a prophet named "Fimun", but they face threats from the Jewish king of that region named "Zunwas" and Haran is ordered to kill Fimun and the adventures that ensue.

== Awards ==
Won the Best Animation at the Fajr Film Festival 2015 and the Jury Prize at the 30th International Children and Youth Film Festival in Isfahan. This animation has so far won international awards from various festivals including:

- New York, Madrid, Hollywood, Jaipur India, Romania, London.

== Others ==
- Producer and Director: Mohammad Amin Hamedani;
- Writer: Hooman Fazel;
- Production Manager: Mostafa Shahmardani;
- Dubbing Manager: Maryam Shirzad;
- Music: Behzad Abdi;
- Editing: Mohammad Amin Hamedani;
- Production Assistants: Vahid Chalak and Hossein Saffarzadegan

== See also ==
- Owj Arts and Media Organization
- Battle of Persian Gulf II
