= Hashim Ahmadzadeh =

Iranian and Kurdish scholar

Hashem Ahmadzadeh
- Born: 1961 (age 64–65)

Academic work
- Discipline: Kurdish studies

Hashem Ahmadzadeh (Persian: هاشم احمدزاده, Sorani Kurdish: ھاشم ئەحمەدزادە) is an Iranian and Kurdish scholar, who is a lecturer in the Kurdish Studies Centre of the University of Exeter.

== Biography ==
Ahmadzadeh was born in eastern Kurdistan in 1961. He got his Bachelor degree in English from Zahedan University in 1985. Afterwards he left Iran and settled in Sweden, where he received his bachelor's degree in political sciences in Uppsala University. In 1996 he got his Master's degree in the same department and in 2003 he finished his PhD. He has been living in England since 2005. He is married and has two children.

== Career ==
Ahmadzadeh teaches at the Institute of Arabic and Islamic Studies (IAIS). Furthermore, he is one of the founding members of the new MA in Kurdish studies which was established in 2006 in the University of Exeter, as well as supervising doctoral students of Kurdish studies.

His doctoral thesis, Nation and Novel: A Study of Kurdish and Persian Narratives Discourse, was translated into Turkish in 2004 by Azad Zana Gundogan It was also translated into Persian by Bakhtiar Sajjadi in 2007. His other works include a translation of Dr. Abbas Vali's Genealogies of the Kurds: Constructions of Nation and National Identity in Kurdish Historical Writing ,The Kurds and their Others: Fragmented Identity and Fragmented Politics into Kurdish as well as Paul Auster's The Red Notebook. Ahmadzadeh has contributed to referred international journals with his essays on modern Kurdish novel and literary criticism.
