= Knife: Meditations After an Attempted Murder =

Autobiographical book by Salman Rushdie

- Author: Salman Rushdie
- Language: English
- Genre: Memoir
- Publisher: Jonathan Cape (UK), Random House (US)
- Publication date: 2024
- Publication place: United Kingdom
- Pages: 224
- ISBN: 9780593730249
- Website: Penguin Random House

Knife: Meditations After an Attempted Murder is an autobiographical book by the British Indian writer Salman Rushdie, first published in April 2024 by Jonathan Cape. The book recounts the stabbing attack on Rushdie in 2022 at Chautauqua Institution in Upstate New York. It hit number one in the Sunday Times Bestsellers List in the General hardbacks category.

Rushdie's 1988 novel The Satanic Verses had led to a widespread controversy among Muslims, prompting the 1989 fatwa issued by Ayatollah Khomeini, the Supreme Leader of Iran.

== Reception ==
According to Literary Hub, in December 2024 the book had appeared on thirteen different "The Best Books of 2024" lists. It was a finalist for the National Book Award for Nonfiction.
