= Mastooran =

- Directed by: Masoud Abparvar; Seyyed Jamal Seyyed Hatami, and Seyyed Ali Hashemi
- Country of origin: Iran
- Original language: Persian

Production
- Production company: Owj Arts and Media Organization

Original release
- Network: Channel 1
- Release: 22 June 2022 – 2023

Mastooran (Persian: مستوران) is an Iranian television series consisting of two seasons: the first season directed by Masoud Abparvar, and Seyyed Jamal Seyyed Hatami and the second season directed by Seyyed Ali Hashemi, commissioned by the Owj Arts and Media Organization for Channel One of the Iranian Broadcasting System.

This series is an adventure and a synthesis of ancient Iranian stories such as One Thousand and One Nights, Kashkul, Golestan and Shahnameh, which is set somewhere in Iran about five hundred years ago in a city called "Mastooran". The first season of this series is about the Safavid and Ghaznavid eras, in which a tribe attacks a child who has been kidnapped, and his mother is looking for a way to get her child back, but there will be many obstacles in her way.

This series consists of 26 episodes and was broadcast on Channel One from June 23, 2022. The second season of this series is about twenty years after the events of the first season, Lotf Ali manages to meet Mahmonir, the daughter of the ruler of Mastooran, on the 13th of Farvardin. This meeting is the beginning of a beautiful and adventurous love. Its second season was broadcast on Channel One.

== Cast of Seasons One and Two ==
Including:

Hamid Reza Azarang, Nazanin Farahani, Bijan Banafshekhah, Kaveh Khodashenas, Roya Mirelmi, Mahya Dehghani, Mazdak Rostami, Rasoul Naqavi, Elham Jafarnejad, Ali Dehkordi, Masoud Abparvar, Rabeh Oskouie, Ghorban Najafi, Fatemeh Goudarzi, Soraya Qasemi, Behnam Tashakkor, Atash Taqipour and ...
