= Habib Ahmadzadeh =

Iranian author

Habib Ahmadzadeh (Persian: حبیب احمدزاده) is an Iranian author novelist and scriptwriter, born in 1963 in Abadan. The Iran–Iraq War features heavily in his work, with observations of human existence and human interactions in wartime informed by his own wartime service. During the war, he rose from being a teenage volunteer Basiji militiaman to becoming a captain in the regular army.

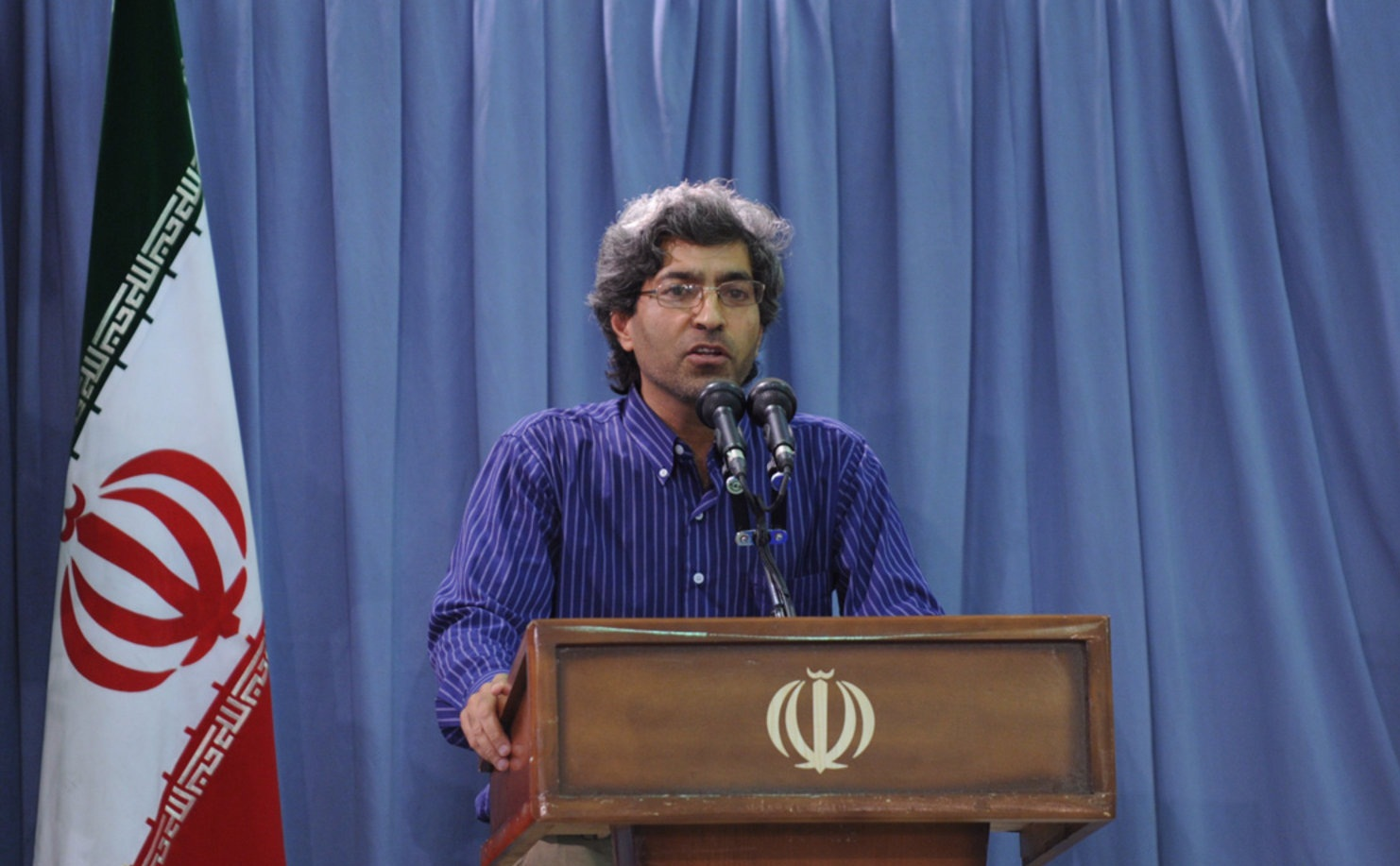
Habib Ahmadzadeh standing at the podium

He earned a BA in Dramatic Literature from Tehran Art University and a Ph.D. in Art Research from Tarbiat Modares University.

== Career ==
In 1998, he began his career in cinema as a script editor with Ebrahim Hatamikia at The Glass Agency, and in 2007, he received the Iranian House of Cinema award for best screenplay for The Night Bus. He has filmed a number of documentaries over his career, the most recent of which, The Outstanding Statue in the World, earned the Tehran Cinema Verite Festival prize for best documentary in 2012. Habib Ahmadzadeh has also been an influential youth advocate in Iran.

== Works ==
- A City Under Siege: Tales of the Iran–Iraq War(Bibliotheca Iranica Persian Fiction in Translation Series), 2010 ISBN 978-1-568-59255-8
- Chess with the Doomsday Machine, 2008 ISBN 978-9-645-06474-5
- Ahmadzadeh, Habib. Code 24. Soore Mehr. ISBN 978-6-000-30305-1.
- Ahmadzadeh, Habib; Sprachman, Paul (2022). "First Words: A Letter to the Saad Family: Tales of the Iran-Iraq War". World Literature Today. 84 (6). doi:10.1353/wlt.2010.0018.

== Awards and recognition ==
- Jalal Al-e Ahmad Literary Awards,2020; Forty Years of Sacred Defense Fiction, a category intended to recognize the authors of the most important war stories written during the last four decades.
- Iranian House of Cinema Award
- Tehran Cinema Verite Festival prize for best documentary, 2012
- Jury Fajr International Film Festival, 2018

== See also ==
- Belgrade fair offers Serbian translation of Persian novel “Chess with the Doomsday Machine”
- Author Habib Ahmadzadeh Tehran Times
- Rosenberg, Shannon (2009). "Chess with the Doomsday Machine". Middle East Journal. 63 (1): 175. ISSN 0026-3141. (Review of Chess with the Doomsday)
- Eshani, Hamid (2011). "A City under Siege". Review of Middle East Studies. 45 (2): 201–203. doi:10.1017/S2151348100002445. (Review of A City Under Siege)

== External links/references ==
- Habib Ahmadzadeh at IMDb
- Habib Ahmadzadeh at Asia Pacific Screen Awards
- Habib Ahmadzadeh. British Film Institute
- Tag: Author - Habib Ahmadzadeh. Tehran Times
- Habib Ahmadzadeh, Open Democracy
- Habib Ahmadzadeh's profile
- Ahmadzadeh's list of published books
- Habib Ahmadzadeh, WorldCat
- Tag Archives for: Iran-Iraq war
