= Owj Arts and Media Organization =

Iranian media organization

- Logo of Owj Arts and Media Organization
- Formation: Spring 2011
- Type: Non-governmental organization
- Headquarters: Tehran, Iran
- Executive Director: Ehsan Mohammad-Hassani & Amirhossein Lotfi Sasan Zare' was recently appointed instead of him
- Parent organization: Islamic Revolutionary Guard Corps
- Website: owjmedia.org

Owj Arts and Media Organization (Persian: سازمان هنری رسانه‌ای اوج; 'Owj' means Peak) is a media organization affiliated with the Islamic Revolutionary Guard Corps in Iran, active in launching campaigns, film production and distribution.

== Ideology and affiliation ==
The organization's works have been described as irritating government of Hassan Rouhani and reformists, anti-Iran deal, anti-American, and subject to Holocaust denial.

Owj organization seems reluctant to provide details about its owner(s) or corporate structure. Its website "About Us" section reads: "Perhaps more important and better than knowing when Owj was established and who were its founders, … it is better to introduce its nature and identity". Owj is formally registered as a non-governmental organization but is affiliated with Islamic Revolutionary Guard Corps. In 2018, Hatamikia claimed so, too.

== Notable works ==
=== Billboard campaign ===
- “Be With Us, Be Safe” (2012–13): The high-context billboard, installed near the busy Valiasr square of Tehran, shows then-U.S. President Barack Obama standing next to Shemr—a villain, according to shi'ite—and offering a letter of protection to the reader. A BBC Persian-style caption reads “Be with us, be safe”.
- “The US Government Styles Honesty [sic, Persian title: American Honesty]” (2013): While nuclear negotiations were ongoing, several posters were installed in Tehran streets, displaying Iranian and American diplomats sitting at the table, with the American side wearing a suit with military pants and boots and pointing a gun towards the Iranian negotiator, who looked like Mohammad Javad Zarif. The billboards were soon removed after becoming controversial.
- “A Single Blossom Does Not Bring Spring: More Children, A Happier Life” (2013–14): Billboards carrying the slogan began to pop up along major highways, targeting the former slogan of family planning in Iran: “Fewer children, better life” and encouraging more children in the family. The posters were heavily criticized for their view on role of mother in family.
- “Know The Shemr of Your Time” (2014)

=== Short animation ===
- Becharkh ta Becharkhim (2015): Roughly translated as 'two can play that game', the animation aired on state-run TV's children's channel IRIB Children symbolically narrates the "honorific" Iran's nuclear program and the "desperate" negotiations from its own point-of-view. The animations depictates Mr. Sam as the villain and characters loosely based on Iranian figures, who are members of the family of "Agha Joon" (Khamenei), such as the compromiser "Uncle Hassan" (Rouhani), the persevering "Uncle Mahmoud" (Ahmadinejad) and the coward "Uncle Mohammad" (Khatami). The animation sparked controversy in April 2016.

=== Documentary ===
- Roaring Waters (2013): Directed by Lebanese filmmaker Mohammad Dabouq about power of Navy of the Army of the Guardians of the Islamic Revolution

=== Feature film ===
- Bodyguard (2016)
- Standing in the Dust (2016)
- The Holy Cast (2016)
- Never (2016)
- Damascus Time (2018)
- The Lost Strait (2018)
- Naela (TBA)
- Tayyeb Khan (TBA)
- Conspiracy Theory (TBA)
- 23 People (2019)
- Prisoners (2019 film) (2019)
  - Exodus (2020)
- Light blue
- Expediency (2020)
- Heihat
- Babai Ghahraman (2024)

=== Festival ===
- 1st Down With USA Great Award (2013)
- 3rd International Holocaust Cartoon Competition (2016): co-organized with Sarcheshmeh Cultural Center

=== Other Works ===
- “Lady World” - on influential religious women.
- Graffiti (Valiasr square)
- Esfand: the film addresses the topic of the Iran-Iraq War, in particular regarding the natives of the Khuzestan province; this film deals with a part of Ali Hashemi's life, especially the period when he was present in the reconnaissance and planning of the Khyber operation.
- Majnoon (Madman) (2024)
- Colonel Soraya (Sarhang Soraya) (2023)
- Woolina and the No Birds (Babaee-ye Ghahreman) (2024)
- Parviz Khan (2024)
- Strange (Gharib) (2023)
- Mansour (2021)
- Abadan 1160 (2020)
- Rooze Balva (2020)
- The Misunderstanding (Soo-e-Tafahom) (2018)
- Lebas Shakhsi (2020)
- Son of Maryam (2022)
- Che (2014)
- Abi-e Roshan (film)
- The Holy Cast
- Mastooran
- God of War (Iranian film)
- Misunderstanding (2018 film)
- Prisoners (2019 film)
- Kufi Love
- Asemane Man
- Karo (2019 film)

=== See also ===
IRIB Ofogh
