= Paul Sprachman =

American writer

- Born: 26 May 1947 (age 79); New York City, United States
- Occupations: Writer and translator
- Writing career
- Language: English
- Period: late 20th–early 21st century
- Genres: Short story, novel
- Notable works: Two Centuries of Silence: Abdulhossein Zarrinkoub and the Formation of Iranian National Identity

Paul Sprachman (born 26 May 1947) is a professor emeritus who taught at Rutgers University in the United States. He earned his PhD degree from University of Chicago in 1981. He has worked and studied in Afghanistan and Iran for a number of years. He lives in the Hudson Valley.

== Works ==
Sprachman has authored several books on Persian literature. His Erotic Persian is a general survey of language and images that arouse sexual desire. Language and Culture in Persian lies at the intersection of what we ordinarily associate with language learning, standard vocabulary, idiom, grammar, etc. and a set of shared assumptions about the world that we call “culture.” Suppressed Persian is an anthology of selected pieces of poetry and prose that deeply offend long-established standards of "good taste" and "morality" in Iran. His Licensed Fool (illustrated by Ardeshir Mohassess) is about the Medieval Persian satirist Obeyd Zakani.

Sprachman has translated a number of Persian books into English, such as Gharbzadegi (Plagued by the West), A City Under Siege: Tales of the Iran-Iraq War, One Woman's War: Da (Mother), Tehran: Revolution Street and Chess with the Doomsday Machine. He published Two Centuries of Silence: Abdulhossein Zarrinkoub and the Formation of Iranian National Identity in 2018. In his extensive introductory essay to Zarrinkub's monograph, Sprachman offers his analysis as how Zarrinkub was compelled to change his historical view of Iranian history after the 1979 Revolution
