= Peace Be On Ibrahim =

Iranian biography and memoir

- Author: A group of writers
- Original title: سلام بر ابراهیم
- Language: Persian, English
- Publication date: 2010
- Publication place: Iran

Peace Be On Ibrahim (in Persian:سلام بر ابراهیم) is the biography and memoir of Ibrahim Hadi, an Iranian soldier who was killed in the Iran-Iraq War and his body was never recovered. This book has a more than 139 editions and more than 1 million hard copies and 5 million soft copies were sold. In 2015, this book was chosen as the best-selling books of the year in Iran.

== Publishing ==
The Persian's version was published first in 2010 by Payam Azadi edition and was reprinted 50 times until 2014. After 4 years, the authors started their own edition. In 2016 it passed the 100th reprints and two years after that 128th time; As of 2019, over than 1.1 million's hard copies of this book have been published.

== Reception ==
In April 2018, The Supreme Leader of Iran, Ali Khamenei, made his comments about the book : "I read a book about the martyr Ibrahim Hadi. It was a very interesting and engrossing book. After reading it, i could not bring myself to put the book away. The allure of the character introduced in this book it is so much that it acts like a magnet pulling us towards it. I ask you to learn more about such exceptional personalities."

== Summary of a memoir ==
When one of his relatives' motorcycle was stolen in front of Hadi's eyes, he chased the thief. During the chase, the thief's hand was injured. When the thief was caught, Ibrahim kindly took the thief to the hospital. When Ibrahim realized that the thief was stealing because of extreme poverty, instead of complaining, he found a job for him with the cooperation of his friends.
