= The Night Bus =

(Source: Iranian Film Quarterly)

The Night Bus (Persian: اتوبوس شب; Transliteration: Otobus-e Shab) is a 2007 Iranian film directed by Kiumars Pourahmad. The film, which is in sharp monochrome, relates the story of a twenty-four-hour-long journey of two young Iranian soldiers (Issā and Emād) and a civilian driver (Amu Rahim) transporting thirty-eight Iraqi prisoners of war, taken from behind the Iraqi line, to a garrison inside Iran. From the details one is informed that the Iran–Iraq War has entered into its third year. The film masterfully depicts the deep inhumanity of acts of war amongst nations by showing the shared humanity of the combatants on both sides. Some scenes of the above-mentioned garrison are reminiscent of those of the 1965 British film The Hill.

In the film, the Iranian characters speak Persian amongst themselves, with a variety of regional accents — emphasising the national character of the war effort, but broken Arabic, comprehensible to a Persian-speaking person, when addressing the Iraqi prisoners. The Arabic dialogues of the film, by the prisoners, are accompanied by Persian subtitles.

== Cast ==
Shakibā'í in the role of Amu Rahim (Source: Film fra sør festivalen 2007)

- Khosrow Shakibā'í: Amu (Uncle), and at times Amu Rahim (Uncle Rahim) and Āghā Joon (Sir my soul), the bus driver. Although it is never stated, the film suggests that Amu Rahim's own son is an Iranian POW in Iraqi hands.
- Mehrdād Sedighiān: Issā (Jesus), the 18-year-old Iranian soldier from Abadan; he is often called by Amu Rahim, somewhat derogatorily, as Bach'cheh (Child, Juvenile); as the emotional bond between the two strengthens, Amu calls Issā once as Issā Jān (Issā my soul). Issā has entered into military service at the age of 16, when his father was killed while defending Abadan; at the outset of the War, the father had sent his entire family, with the exception of Issā, to his brother's home in another Iranian city for safety. Won the Asia Pacific Screen Award for Best Performance by an Actor for this role.
- Amir-Mohammd Zand: Emād, the second and the more senior Iranian soldier/officer. Emād had just started studying in London when the War broke out, whereon he volunteered as an officer in the army.
- Elnāz Shākerdoust: Reyhāneh, wife of Emād. She and Emād, along with her parents, had been living in London. When Emād volunteered to serve in the War effort, she returned with Emād to Iran, leaving the parents in London.
- Mohammad-Reza Foroutan: Fārouq (Fārouq Abd al-Amir), an Iraqi POW whose father is Iraqi and mother Iranian. It turns out that two of Fārouq's brothers are on the run from the henchmen of Saddam Hossein and a third brother and a sister are in Saddam Hossein's jails, awaiting execution.
- Kourosh Soleimani: Sirvān (Sirvān Foād), an Iraqi POW from Iraq's Kurdistan and a recent medical graduate. Prior to the War, Sirvān had been studying medicine in London; he had only returned to Iraq for bringing his family into safety, but forcefully drafted into the Iraqi army.
- Ahmad Kavari: An Iraqi POW and a member of Iraq's Baath Party.
- Mehran Nael: An Iranian tank driver from Esfahan (this as betrayed by his Esfahani accent) who despite having fought valiantly and helped capturing some tanks from Iraqis, seems to be unable to think ill of any one; he appears to live mentally in an Utopian world of his own. Although Mehrān Nātel's appearance in the film is very brief, he shows himself as another extraordinarily talented young actor of the Iranian cinema.

== See also ==
- Iran–Iraq War
- Persepolis (banned in Iran)
- Fortune Told in Blood
