= Fortune Told in Blood =

Novel by Davud Ghaffarzadegan

- Front cover of English translation of Fortune Told in Blood
- Author: Davud Ghaffarzadegan
- Original title: Persian: فال خون
- Translator: M.R. Ghanoonparvar
- Language: Persian
- Genre: Novella
- Published: 1996
- Publisher: Soore Mehr (Iran); Center for Middle Eastern Studies, the University of Texas at Austin (US)
- Publication place: Iran
- English publication date: 2008
- Media type: Book
- Pages: xv + 69
- ISBN: 9780292718395

Fortune Told in Blood (Persian: فال خون, or Fal-E Khoon) is a 1996 Persian-language war novel by Davud Ghaffarzadegan about an Iraqi lieutenant and soldier in the Iran-Iraq war. It was translated into English in 2008 by M.R. Ghanoonparvar and published by the Center for Middle Eastern Studies at the University of Texas at Austin.

The book won an award in the "A Quarter Century of Sacred Defense Books" festival in the novel category (which consisted of about 700 books.)

== Synopsis ==
Fortune Told in Blood is a novel about two Iraqi soldiers in the Iran-Iraq war. They are quite different people, but the war destroyed both of their lives.

The two men, a lieutenant and soldier, are sent to a mountain in order to identify Iranian movements and installations. Their position on the mountain is relatively safe, as they are snowbound in a bunker, so they do not worry much. They have many magazines in their trench to keep them from boredom and keep thoughts of death aside. One day after lunch, they read tarot cards together and see bloody events in their future. After this day, bloody events began to happen to them.

== Author ==
Davud Ghaffarzadegan, the Iranian teacher and writer, was born in 1959 in Ardebil. He wrote more than two decades and published over twenty-five short story collections and novels for adults and teenagers. His stories have been translated into English, Chinese, Turkish, and Arabic. He wrote Fortune Told in Blood from the Iraqi's point of view and emphasized the human role in war.

== Publisher ==
The book was written in 1996 and published in Persian by Soore Mehr Publishing Company in 2011. Fortune Told in Blood has been nominated for and received numerous awards, and has been reprinted many times in Iran. According to critics, Fortune Told in Blood is one of the most prominent novels about the Iran-Iraq war in recent years. In 2008, the book was translated from Persian into English by Mohammad Reza Ghanoonparvar and published by Center for Middle Eastern Studies at University of Texas at Austin.

== Translator ==
Mohammad Reza Ghanoonparvar is UT Professor of Persian and Comparative Literature. Ghanoonparvar has written several books about Persian literature and culture as In a Persian Mirror (1993), Translating the Garden (2001), Reading Chubak (2005), and Persian Cuisine (2006). By the Pen, The Patient Stone, Savushun, and The Myth of Creation are a few books that Ghanoonparvar has translated into English.

== Awards ==
On 27 September 2009, Fortune Told in Blood won award of "A Quarter Century of Sacred Defense Books" festival in the novel category. The book was selected from 700 books in the festival.

== See also ==
- Chess with the Doomsday Machine
- Eternal Fragrance
- Journey to Heading 270 Degrees
- Noureddin, Son of Iran
- One Woman's War: Da (Mother)
- That Which That Orphan Saw
- The Night Bus
- Baba Nazar (book)
