= One Woman's War: Da (Mother) =

Memoir about the role of Iranian mothers during the Iran–Iraq War

- Front cover of English translation of One Woman's War
- Author: Seyedeh Azam Hosseini
- Translator: Paul Sprachman
- Language: English
- Genre: Memoir
- Published: 2014 Mazda Publishers
- Publication place: United States
- Media type: Book
- Pages: xxxii+696
- ISBN: 1-56859-273-6

One Woman's War: Da (Mother) (Persian: دا، جنگ یک زن) is a memoir by Seyyedeh Zahra Hosseini detailing her experiences during the Iran–Iraq War as recorded by Seyedeh Azam Hosseini (no relation).

The memoir was recorded through thousands of hours of conversation between Zahra Hosseini and Azam Hosseini, while parts of the book are autobiography by the narrator. The title, Da, means "mother" in Kurdish and Luri, and was meant to memorialize the role of Iranian mothers during the Iran–Iraq War.

The book won the 2009 Jalal Al-e Ahmad Literary Award in the "Documentation and historiography" category, Iran's most lucrative literary award. It undergone more than 140 reprints in three years and became the biggest best seller in the shortest period as the publishers say.

== Narrative ==
One Woman's War: Da (Mother) focuses on Zahra Hosseini's life in Basra and Khorramshahr. The book consists of three parts with the years of city under siege making the core part of this memoir. The first part details Hosseini's childhood in Iraq, her family's migration to Iran due to pressure from the Ba'ath regime, and her first years in Iran. The second part details Hosseini's activities in nursing injured fighters, helping in the delivery of supplies to the front line, preparing the corpses of fighters for burial, and participating in firefights. The final part details Hosseini's recovery from a shrapnel injury and her married life.

== The narrator ==
Seyyedeh Zahra Hosseini is an Iranian Kurd who was born in Iraq in 1963. Her parents came to Iran when she was a child and lived in Khorramshahr and the father of the family was hired by the municipality. She was the second child of six, and stopped going to school after she finished fifth grade. When the war broke out Hosseini aided the war effort in various roles such as cemetery work. She also engaged in firefights and received a dangerous shrapnel wound near her spine. The injury forced her to leave the battlefield and spend a month in hospital.

== Genre ==
The book is the result of thousands of hours of oral history narration by Seyyedeh Zahra Hosseini dictated to Azam Hosseini. Beside the oral history, the book also contains autobiography by the narrator.

== Publication ==
The book was first published in Persian by Sureye Mehr Publication Company in 2008, and was a bestseller at the Tehran 23rd International Book Fair and "the biggest seller in the shortest period in Iranian publishing history" which has had more than 140 reprints in three years, according to the publishers. In 2014, the book was translated from Persian to English by Paul Sprachman, a professor at Rutgers University, and published by Mazda Publishers. Hosseini's memoir is being translated into Urdu and Turkish. A Spanish translation was announced in October 2014.

== Awards ==
The book won the 2009 Jalal Al-e Ahmad Literary Award in the "Documentation and historiography" category. It is considered Iran's most lucrative literary award.

== Reception ==
The book was unveiled at the Iranian mission at the United Nations in New York City. The translator, Paul Sprachman, admired the book and said: "I got a deeper understanding of the book, after the conversation I had with Seyyedeh Zahra Hossein, the narrator of Da. I discovered the difference between the Iran-Iraq war and other wars, after I read Da. It was, as Iranians say, a sacred defense and full of spirituality."

A review of the book was published on the website of Iran English Radio in April 2009. The book was also the subject of an in-depth analysis by Laetitia Nanquette, published in Iranian Studies in 2013. A research paper on the book was published in 2013 in the Sociological Journal of Art and Literature.

The death of Shahpasand Hosseini, Zahra Hosseini's mother and one of the main characters of this book, was announced in June 2014.

== TV program adaptation ==
A TV adaptation by Sina Ataiyan was broadcast on IRIB 1, before the main news program at 9 pm. The adaptation consisted of 120 15-minute episodes. The producer, Ali Taghipour, claimed that they were faithful to the context of the book. This TV series consisted of animated movies besides narration of the book by some of Iranian actresses who had personal interest in the book subject.

== See also ==
- Battle of Khorramshahr
- Chess with the Doomsday Machine
- Eternal Fragrance
- Noureddin, Son of Iran
- That Which That Orphan Saw
- Fortune Told in Blood
- Journey to Heading 270 Degrees
