= Noureddin, Son of Iran =

- Author: Masoume Sepehri
- Language: Persian
- Genre: Memoir
- Publisher: Sureye Mehr Publication
- Publication date: 2011
- Publication place: Iran
- Media type: Book
- Pages: 700
- ISBN: 978-600-175-220-9

Noureddin, Son of Iran (Persian: نورالدین پسر ایران) is the memoirs of Sayyid Noureddin Afi from the 80 months of his participation in the Iran–Iraq war. Noureddin, Son of Iran led to Afi's reputation in Iran after it was published by Sureye Mehr Publication in 2011. In 1994, Mousa Ghayour recorded the memoirs of Noureddin Afi in Turkish and it was presented as a written book by Masoume Sepehri years later. This book consisted of 18 chapters along with photographs. The narrator mentions a dream as the reason of producing this war memoir. Noureddin, Son of Iran received an honorable mention in the "Memoir" category of the Jalal Al-e Ahmad Literary Awards (2012).

== Narrative ==
Sayyid Noureddin wants to participate the Iran–Iraq war, but he is not allowed at first because he is still young. He tries repeatedly and finally they let him go to war. He attends a military training course in the fall of 1980, and heads toward the western zones of Iran to serve in the Sepah of the Mehabad. He moves to the southern war zones along with his brother, Sadegh. Nourreddin loses his brother in an Iraqi airstrike. With shrapnel in his body they make him go under surgery in the hospitals of Mashhad and Kermanshah many times. But he does not recover well because he is severely damaged in the face, eyes and stomach. Due to the severe injuries on his face, his countenance changes when he is only 18. In 1984, he marries a 16-year-old girl named Masoume and their child is born 4 years later. The war finishes but he is still suffering the injuries and he misses his lovely friends, especially Amir Maralbash who was killed in the war.

== Why it was written ==
In the final pages of his memoir, Afi discloses his reasons for sharing his experiences from the war. Initially, he did not see the importance of recounting these memories, being preoccupied with his own recovery from war injuries. This perspective shifted after a dream in 1994, where he saw Iran's Supreme Leader, Ayatollah Ali Khamenei, tearfully reading the account of a veteran who had served for 80 months and was 70% disabled, yet felt his own story was insignificant. This vision motivated Afi to document his eight-year wartime experience, feeling it was his duty to ensure that the experiences of himself and others were not forgotten. His memoir aims to preserve these memories for historical record:

I never thought that, telling the memories is important nowadays. However, war memories and interviews were not discussed and I was involved with the side effects my injuries. In 1994, I dreamed that Mr Khamenei was reading some papers and crying. I was there, Some one said that these papers were the memories of a 70% veteran who had participated in war for 80 months and still said he had nothing for the war...My mind was busy with this dream and I felt my duty would finish by telling these memories. So, I recounted the eight years of living in the war context to make those unique times survive for ever. (P632)

== Animated movie ==
Noureddin, Son of Iran is an animated movie directed by Meisam Hosseini. The movie consists of 30 parts of 15 minutes each. Famous Iranian artists such as Atila Pesyani, Pejman Bazeghi, Ali Saleh Ala and Masoud Forutan worked on the movie.

== See also ==
- Peace Be On Ibrahim
- One Woman's War: Da (Mother)
- That Which That Orphan Saw
- Fortune Told in Blood
- Journey to Heading 270 Degrees
- Baba Nazar (book)
