= That Which That Orphan Saw =

2000 book by Mohammad Reza Sarshar

- Front cover of English translation of That Which That Orphan Saw
- Author: Mohammad Reza Sarshar
- Translator: James C. Clark
- Language: Persian
- Genre: Historical literature
- Publisher: Beh Nashr (Astan Quds Razavi publication), Sureye Mehr Publication
- Publication date: 2000
- Publication place: Iran
- Media type: Book
- Pages: 592
- ISBN: 978-964-02-0732-1

That Which That Orphan Saw (Persian: آنک آن یتیم نظر کرده) is a novel by Iranian author Mohammad Reza Sarshar about the life of Mohammad, the prophet of Islam. That Which That Orphan Saw has received numerous awards and has been reprinted many times in Iran. The idea for writing the novel came to Sarshar in 1980 because he believed that there were no valuable life stories about Mohammad available for teenagers.

== Narrative ==
The first part of That Which That Orphan Saw starts with a dream of Abdul-Muttalib in which he is ordered to dig the Zamzam Well. He finds the place to dig near Mecca. The Quraysh are against digging the well and ask Abdul-Muttalib not to do this. Finally, they agree to visit a priest and accept his judgement. Some of the Quraysh head towards the place of the priest along with Abdul-Muttalib. They miss the way and come across a difficult situation so that they let Abdul-Muttalib dig the well. Abdul-Muttalib finds a treasure while digging the well. The Quraysh tribe believe that the treasure belongs to all of them and so they decide to equitably share each part of the treasure.

Abdul-Muttalib wished to have many sons in order to protect himself from the invasions. When his dream comes true, he decides to sacrifice one of his sons based on his covenant with God. His dearest son, Abdullah is chosen by chance to be sacrificed. When he tries to sacrifice his son they prohibit him and advise him to visit a priestess, as a neutral person, and accept her judgement.

The priestess tells them to choose the sacrifice between Abdullah and certain number of camels by chance and increase the number of the camels by ten if Abdullah is chosen firstly. "Repeat this up to the time the camels are chosen", the priestess says. Abdul-Muttalib acts on the recommendation of the priestess and finally kills 300 camels and Abdullah survives. Abdullah marries a woman and she gives birth to a son, Muhammad. He moves towards Sham and becomes sick and dies near Yathrib.

== Release ==
The book was translated to English by James C. Klark. The book has also been published in Urdu, Arabic, and Turkish. The 8th reprinting was published in May 2013.

== See also ==
- One Woman's War: Da (Mother)
- Noureddin, Son of Iran
- Fortune Told in Blood
- Journey to Heading 270 Degrees
- Baba Nazar (book)
