= Lilliput and Blefuscu =

Fictional island states in Gulliver's Travels

Lilliput
- Gulliver's Travels location
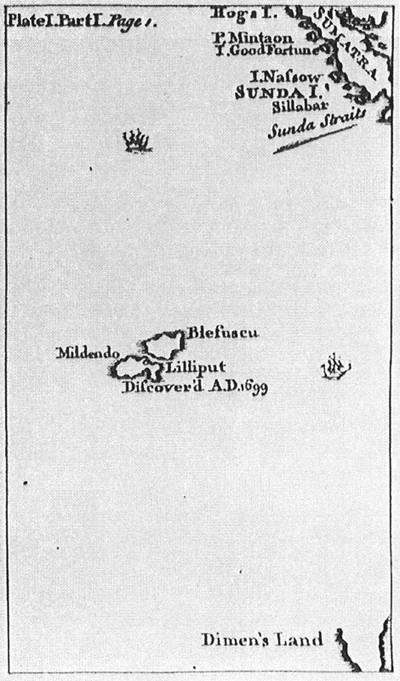
- Map of Lilliput and Blefuscu (original map, Pt I, Gulliver's Travels). It shows their location in the Indian Ocean, off the coast of Sumatra.
- Created by: Jonathan Swift
- Genre: Satire

In-universe information
- Type: Monarchy
- Ethnic group: Lilliputians
- Locations: Mildendo (capital)
- Currency: Sprug

Blefuscu
- Gulliver's Travels location
- Created by: Jonathan Swift
- Genre: Satire

In-universe information
- Type: Monarchy
- Ethnic group: Blefuscudians
- Locations: Blefuscu (capital)
- Currency: Sprug

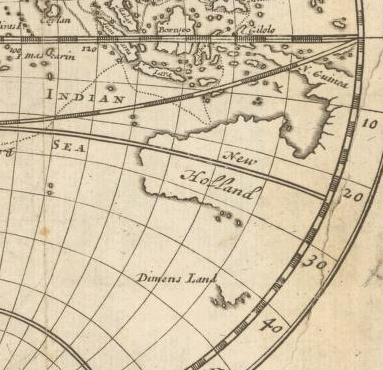
Herman Moll: A map of the world showing the course of Mr Dampiers voyage round it from 1679 to 1691, London 1697. Cropped region near the fictional island Lilliput. Swift was known to be on friendly terms with the cartographer Herman Moll and even mentions him explicitly in Gulliver's Travels (1726), chapter four, part eleven. The pair of islands center left on the map are Île Amsterdam (Amsterdam, seemingly corresponding to Blefuscu) and Île Saint-Paul (Saint Paul Island, corresponding to Lilliput) to the north and south, respectively.

Lilliput and Blefuscu are two fictional island nations that appear in the first part of the 1726 satirical prose novel Gulliver's Travels by Jonathan Swift. The two islands are neighbours in the South Indian Ocean, separated by a channel 800 yards (730 m) wide. Both are inhabited by tiny people who are about one-twelfth the height of ordinary human beings. Both nations are empires and the capital of Lilliput is Mildendo.

== Location ==
Swift gives the location of Lilliput and Blefuscu in Part I of Gulliver's Travels, both in the text and with a map, though neither correspond to real-world geography, even as it was known in Swift's time. The text states that Gulliver's ship (the Antelope) was bound for the East Indies when it was caught in "a violent storm to the northwest of Van Diemen's Land" (Tasmania). He gives the latitude as 30°2'S, though the longitude is unspecified. Likewise, the map depicts Lilliput and Blefuscu south of "Hogs Island" (Simeulue), off northwest Sumatra, and northwest of Van Diemen's Land, though the map is considerably foreshortened; Van Diemen's Land is shown south of the Sunda Strait, some 10° (700 miles) east of Hogs Island, whereas Tasmania is actually some 40° (2,500 miles) east of that meridian. Neither the text nor the map make reference to New Holland (Western Australia), which had been discovered in 1644, some 80 years before publication, and was well-documented in the maps of Swift's time. While Australia's Cocos (Keeling) Islands are in roughly the right map location south-west of Sumatra, have two inhabited islands, and would have been known of in Swift's day, they are at entirely the wrong latitude.

Because the area indicated by Swift is actually occupied by Australia, and on the basis of other textual evidence, some authors have concluded that Swift intended to place Lilliput in the Pacific Ocean, to the northeast, not northwest, of Van Diemen's Land. However, none of the sea routes to the East Indies, Gulliver's stated destination, required ships to round Van Diemen's Land; the northern routes, via India or Ceylon, avoided Australia altogether, while the southern (Brouwer) route, taking advantage of the Roaring Forties, turned northeast in mid-ocean precisely to avoid New Holland, though the number of shipwrecks on that coast from the period attests to the dangers of overshooting the turning point. Swift was sceptical about the reliability of the travel literature of his day, and it is suggested that the unlikely geographic descriptions parody many of these works (described by Percy Adams as "travel lies").

== Geography ==
Lilliput is said to extend 5,000 blustrugs, or 12 miles in circumference. Blefuscu is located northeast of Lilliput, across an 800-yard (730 m) channel. The only cities mentioned by Swift are Mildendo, the capital of Lilliput, and Blefuscu, capital of Blefuscu. However, the map showing Lilliput's position depicts the islands as considerably larger, approaching the size of Van Diemen's Land.

== History and politics ==
Lilliput is said to be ruled by an Emperor, Golbasto Momarem Evlame Gurdilo Shefin Mully Ully Gue. He is assisted by a first minister (who carries a white staff) and several other officials (who bring articles of impeachment against Gulliver on grounds of treason): the galbet or high admiral, Skyresh Bolgolam; the lord high treasurer, Flimnap; the general, Limnoc; the chamberlain, Lalcom; and the grand justiciary, Balmuff. Blefuscu is also ruled by an Emperor, who is not named.

Both nations follow the teachings of a prophet, Lustrog, as recorded in their scripture, known as the Blundecral ("which is their Alcoran or Bible, we don't really know"). Sectarian divisions exist in the debate between "Little-Endians" and "Big-Endians" (see below).

=== Satirical interpretations ===
Lilliput and Blefuscu were intended as, and understood to be, satirical portraits of the Kingdom of Great Britain and the Kingdom of France, respectively, as they were in the early 18th century. Only the internal politics of Lilliput are described in detail; these are parodies of British politics, in which the great central issues of the day are belittled and reduced to unimportance.

For instance, the two major political parties of the day were the Whigs and the Tories. The Tories are parodied as the Tramecksan or "High-Heels" (due to their adhesion to the high church party of the Church of England, and their exalted views of royal supremacy), while the Whigs are represented as the Slamecksan or "Low-Heels" (the Whigs inclined toward low church views, and believed in parliamentary supremacy). These issues, generally considered to be of fundamental importance to the constitution of Great Britain, are reduced by Swift to a difference in fashions.

The Emperor of Lilliput is described as a partisan of the Low-Heels, just as King George I employed only Whigs in his administration; the Emperor's heir is described as having "one of his heels higher than the other", which describes the encouragement by the Prince of Wales (the future George II) of the political opposition during his father's life.

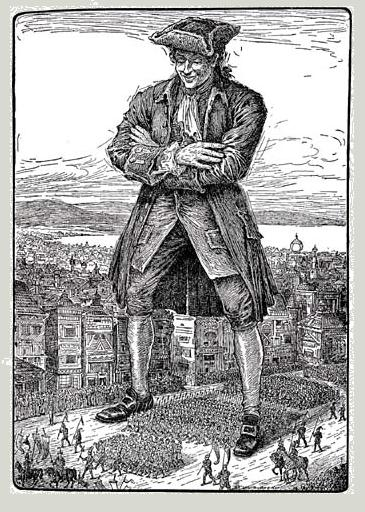
Gulliver inspecting the army of Lilliput

The novel further describes an intra-Lilliputian quarrel over the practice of breaking eggs. Traditionally, Lilliputians broke boiled eggs on the larger end (big endian); a few generations ago, an Emperor of Lilliput, the Present Emperor's great-grandfather, had decreed that all eggs be broken on the smaller end (little endian) after his son cut himself breaking the egg on the larger end. The differences between Big-Endians (those who broke their eggs at the larger end) and Little-Endians had given rise to "six rebellions ... wherein one Emperor lost his life, and another his crown". The Lilliputian religion says an egg should be broken on the convenient end, which is now interpreted by the Lilliputians as the smaller end. The Big-Endians gained favour in Blefuscu.

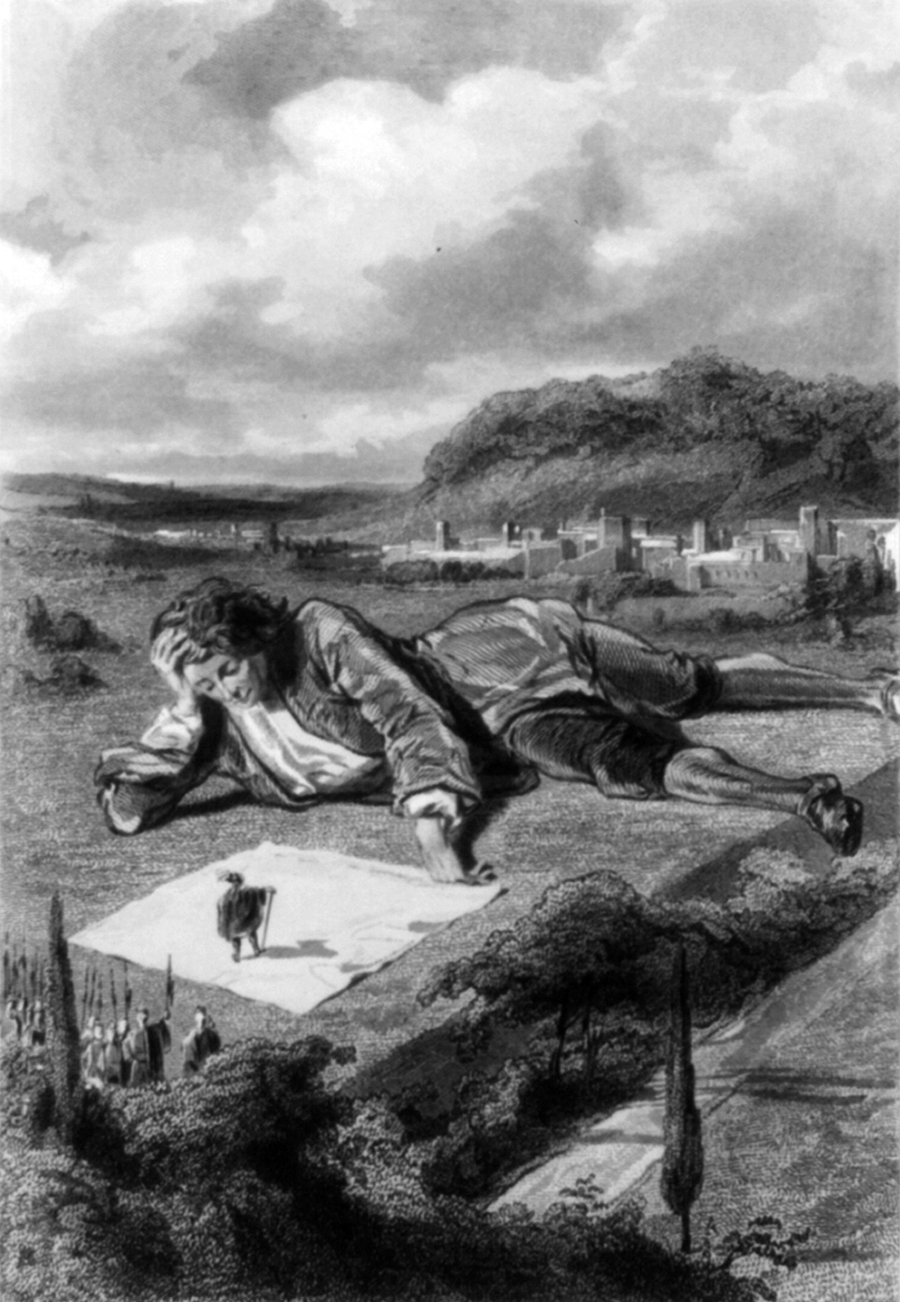
Gulliver and the Emperor of Lilliput, from a French edition of Gulliver's Travels (1850s)

The Big-Endian/Little-Endian controversy reflects, in a much simplified form, British quarrels over religion. Less than 200 years previously, England had been a Catholic (Big-Endian) country; but a series of reforms beginning in the 1530s under King Henry VIII (reigned 1509–1547), Edward VI (1547–1553), and Queen Elizabeth I (1558–1603) had converted most of the country to Protestantism (Little-Endianism), in the episcopalian form of the Church of England. At the same time, revolution and reform in Scotland (1560) had also converted that country to Presbyterian Protestantism, which led to fresh difficulties when England and Scotland were united under one ruler, James I (1603–1625).

Religiously inspired revolts and rebellions followed, in which, indeed, one king, Charles I (1625–49) lost his life, and his grandson James II lost his crown and fled to France (1685–1688). Some of these conflicts were between Protestants and Catholics; others were between different branches of Protestantism. Swift does not clearly distinguish between these different kinds of religious strife.

Swift has his Lilliputian informant blame the "civil commotions" on the propaganda of the Emperor of Blefuscu, i.e. the King of France; this primarily reflects the encouragement given by King Louis XIV of France to James II in pursuit of his policies to advance the toleration of Catholicism in Great Britain. He adds that "when (the commotions) were quelled, the (Big-Endian) exiles always fled for refuge to that empire" (Blefuscu/France). This partially reflects the exile of King Charles II on the Continent (in France, Germany, the Spanish Netherlands, and the Dutch Republic) from 1651 to 1660, but more particularly the exile of the Catholic King James II from 1688 to 1701. James II was dead by the time Swift wrote Gulliver's Travels, but his heir James Francis Edward Stuart, also Catholic, maintained his pretensions to the British throne from a court in France (primarily at Saint-Germain-en-Laye) until 1717, and both Jameses were regarded as a serious threat to the stability of the British monarchy until the end of the reign of George II. The court of the Pretender attracted those Jacobites, and their Tory sympathizers, whose political activity precluded them staying safely in Great Britain; notable among them was Swift's friend, the Anglican Bishop of Rochester Francis Atterbury, who was exiled to France in 1722.

Swift's Lilliputian claims that the machinations of "Big-Endian exiles" at the court of the Emperor of Blefuscu have brought about a continuous war between Lilliput and Blefuscu for "six and thirty moons" (Lilliputians calculate time in "moons", not years; their time-scale, while not one-twelfth the size of normal humans, appears to be somewhat faster, since the emperor was stated to be "past his prime" before he was thirty.) This is an allusion to the wars fought under King William III and Queen Anne against France under Louis XIV, the War of the Grand Alliance (1689–97) and the War of the Spanish Succession (1701–1713). In both cases, the claims of the exiled House of Stuart were marginal to other causes of war, but were an important propaganda point in Great Britain itself, as both James II and James Francis Edward were accused of allying with foreigners to force Catholicism on the British people.

In the novel, Gulliver washes up on the shore of Lilliput and is captured by the inhabitants while asleep. He offers his services to the Emperor of Lilliput in his war against Blefuscu, and succeeds in capturing the (one-twelfth sized) Blefuscudian fleet. Despite a triumphant welcome, he soon finds himself at odds with the Emperor of Lilliput, as he declines to conquer the rest of Blefuscu for him and to force the Blefuscudians to adopt Little-Endianism.

Gulliver's position reflects the decision of the Tory government to withdraw from the War of the Spanish Succession. Britain's allies considered the important objects of the war to have been met, and that the Whigs' larger claims were excessive. The withdrawal was seen by the Whigs as a betrayal of British interests. Swift (a Tory) is here engaged in an apology.

Gulliver is, after further adventures, condemned as a traitor by the Council of Lilliput, and condemned to be blinded amidst other offenses he did like urinating on a burning building to put out a fire. He escapes his punishment with help from a sympathetic Liliputian in the Emperor's royal court by fleeing to Blefuscu. This condemnation parallels that issued to the chief ministers of the Tory government that had made peace with France, Robert Harley, 1st Earl of Oxford and Mortimer, who was impeached and imprisoned in the Tower of London from 1715 to 1717; and Henry St John, 1st Viscount Bolingbroke, who, after his political fall, received vague threats of capital punishment and fled to France in 1715, where he remained until 1723.

== Post-Swift descriptions ==
=== Early works ===
In 1728, John Arbuthnot wrote An account of the state of learning in the empire of Lilliput: Together with the history and character of Bullum the Emperor's Library-Keeper; this purported to be transcribed from a treatise by Gulliver on the empire of Lilliput alluded to in chapter 4 of Gulliver's Travels. Arbuthnot used this work to satirise Richard Bentley, master of Trinity College, Cambridge but also described the early history of Lilliput and Blefuscu. At one time (Gulliver is told), Blefuscu was a commonwealth and had its own language and an extensive literature. Lilliput, meanwhile, was divided among several petty kingdoms. The first emperor of Blefuscu attacked and subdued Lilliput, but later the Lilliputians won their independence and set up their own emperor.

=== 20th-century works ===
It has been pointed out that the long and vicious war that started after a disagreement about which was the best end on which to break an egg is an example of the narcissism of small differences, a term Sigmund Freud coined in the early 1900s.

In 1946, T. H. White wrote Mistress Masham's Repose, which describes the adventures of a girl, Maria, who discovers a group of Lilliputians on a tiny forgotten island in the lake of a ruinous estate in Northamptonshire.

A modernised Lilliput is the setting of a 1958 sequel children's novel, Castaways in Lilliput, by Henry Winterfeld. This book provides more geographical detail: other cities in addition to Mildendo include Plips (a major city and cathedral town), Wiggywack (a suburb of Mildendo and seat of the Island Council), Tottenham (on the west coast), and Allenbeck (at the mouth of a river on the west coast). Winterfeld also provides further details of Lilliputian history. The Emperor of Gulliver's time, Mully Ully Gue, is said to have reigned 1657–1746. (This contradicts Swift's account, in which the Emperor is only 28 years old and has reigned about seven years when Gulliver arrives in 1699.) His descendant, Alice, is the reigning Queen in the 1950s when three Australian children visit the island. The monetary system has apparently also been changed, the sprug of Swift's novel replaced by the onze, equal to ten dimelings or 100 bims. Technology has kept pace with the outside world, so the Lilliputians have trains, automobiles, helicopters, telephones, and telegraphs. Winterfeld describes the flag of Lilliput as having blue and white stripes with a golden crown on a red field. These symbols are also painted on the police helicopters.

== Language ==
Swift presents a number of Lilliputian words and phrases, and further states that the official languages of Lilliput and Blefuscu are about as far apart as typical European languages. Arbuthnot explains further that Blefuscu originally had its own language and an extensive literature, but during the period when it occupied Lilliput, the Blefuscudian language was much altered by contact with Lilliputian. Blefuscudian remained an old language of scholarship. In T. H. White's sequel, Mistress Masham's Repose, the protagonist Maria studies the Lilliputian language from a book owned by her professor friend. This is a rare copy of Gulliver's 1735 treatise: A General Description of the Empire of Lilliput, from its first Erection, through a long Series of Princes; with a Particular Account of their Wars and Politicks, Laws, Learning, & Religion, their Plants and Animals, their peculiar Manners and Customs, with other Matters very curious and useful, to which is added a Brief Vocabulary of their Language, with its English Correspondencies. In Winterfeld's sequel, English has become the official language, due to a decision of the Council of the Island in 1751.

== Other references ==
Lilliput House, overlooking Lough Ennell in County Westmeath

- Lilliput is reputedly named after the townland of Lilliput on the shores of Lough Ennell near Dysart, just a few miles from Mullingar, in County Westmeath, Ireland. Swift was a regular visitor to the Rochfort family at Gaulstown House. It is said that it was when Dean Swift looked across the expanse of Lough Ennell one day and saw the tiny human figures on the opposite shore of the lake that he conceived the idea of the Lilliputians featured in Gulliver's Travels. In fact, the townland was known as Nure from ancient times and was renamed Lileput or Lilliput shortly after the publication of Gulliver's Travels in honour of Swift's association with the area. Lilliput House has stood in the locality since the 18th century.
- Lilliput and Blefuscu were the names used for Britain and France, respectively, in a series of semi-fictional transcripts (with mutated names of people and places) of debates in the British Parliament. This series was written by William Guthrie, Samuel Johnson, and John Hawkesworth, and was printed in Edward Cave's periodical The Gentleman's Magazine from 1738 to 1746.
- The word lilliputian has become an adjective meaning "very small in size", or "petty or trivial". When used as a noun, it means either "a tiny person" or "a person with a narrow outlook, who minds the petty and trivial things."
- The use of the terms "Big-Endian" and "Little-Endian" in the story is the source of the computing term endianness.
- Neela Mahendra, the love interest in Salman Rushdie's novel Fury, is an "Indo-Lilly", a member of the Indian Diaspora from the politically unstable country of Lilliput-and-Blefuscu.
- Several craters on Mars's moon Phobos are named after Lilliputians. Perhaps inspired by Johannes Kepler (and quoting Kepler's third law), Swift's satire Gulliver's Travels refers to two moons in Part 3, Chapter 3 (the "Voyage to Laputa"), in which the astronomers of Laputa are described as having discovered two satellites of Mars orbiting at distances of 3 and 5 Martian diameters, and periods of 10 and 21.5 hours, respectively.
- Lilliput is mentioned throughout the 2005 Malplaquet trilogy of children's novels by Andrew Dalton. Taking much of their initial inspiration from T. H. White's Mistress Masham's Repose, the books describe the adventures of a large colony of Lilliputians living secretly in the enormous and mysterious grounds of an English country house (Stowe House in Buckinghamshire). Their longed-for return to their ancestral homeland is one of the major themes of the stories.
- In the Gabby cartoon shorts, it is the main and only major location mentioned.

== See also ==
- The Borrowers
- The Butter Battle Book, which details a war fought over which side of bread is spread
