= The Golden House (novel) =

2017 novel by Salman Rushdie

- Cover of first edition
- Author: Salman Rushdie
- Language: English
- Publisher: Jonathan Cape
- Publication date: 5 September 2017
- Publication place: United Kingdom
- Media type: Print (hardcover)
- Pages: 370
- ISBN: 978-1787330153
- Preceded by: Two Years Eight Months and Twenty-Eight Nights
- Followed by: Quichotte

The Golden House is a 2017 novel by Salman Rushdie. The novel, his eleventh, is set in Mumbai and New York.

== Summary ==
The story follows a neophyte indie film maker from a quiet multicultural neighborhood in New York City when a mysterious family, Nero "Golden" and his three adult sons, move into the Golden House and become the subject of his ten-year-long film project. The story covers the cultural angst of the 2016 United States Presidential election campaign as well as looking backwards into the crime and film syndicates of Mumbai.

== Reviews ==
Writing for The Guardian, Aminatta Forna said: "Rushdie puts his finger on the nationwide identity crisis in this novel of race, reinvention and the different bubbles of US life." Reviewer Dwight Garner of The New York Times opined: "'The Golden House' is a big novel, wide but shallow, so wide it has its own meteorology. The forecast: heavy wind"; while New Statesman reviewer Leo Robson dismissed it as "little more than an exercise in googling, an attempt to sell the listicle as literature."
