= The Enchantress of Florence =

2008 novel by Salman Rushdie

- Cover of the first edition
- Author: Salman Rushdie
- Language: English
- Genre: Novel
- Publisher: Random House
- Publication date: 11 April 2008
- Publication place: United Kingdom
- Media type: Print (hardback)
- Pages: 352 pp. (first edition, hardback)
- ISBN: 0-375-50433-8 (first edition, hardback)
- OCLC: 187302674
- Preceded by: Shalimar the Clown
- Followed by: Two Years Eight Months and Twenty-Eight Nights

The Enchantress of Florence is the ninth novel by Salman Rushdie. It was published on 11 April 2008 by Jonathan Cape London, and in the United States by Random House. The story moves between continents, and mixes history with fantasy.

== Plot outline ==
The central theme of The Enchantress of Florence is the visit of a European to the Mughal emperor Akbar's court and his claim that he is a long lost relative of Akbar, born of an exiled Indian princess and an Italian from Florence. The story moves between continents, the court of Akbar to Renaissance Florence mixing history, fantasy and fable.

=== Part one ===
The tale of adventure begins in Fatehpur Sikri, the capital of Mughal emperor Akbar the Great, when a stranger arrives, having stowed away on a pirate ship captained by the Scottish Lord Hauksbank, and sets the Mughal court talking and looking back into its past.

=== Part two ===
The stranger begins to tell Akbar the tale, going back to the boyhood of three friends in Florence, Il Machia, Ago Vespucci and Nino Argalia, the last of whom became an adventurer in the East.

=== Part three ===
The tale returns to the mobs and clamour of Florence in the hands of the House of Medici.

An eight-page bibliography follows the end of the story.

== Background and themes ==
The Enchantress of Florence is the ninth novel by Salman Rushdie. According to Rushdie this is his "most researched book", which required "years and years of reading".

The book relates a succession of interweaving stories by a variety of storytellers, travellers, and adventurers. It touches on the histories and cultures of the various settings, including the Mughal and Ottoman Empires, the earlier Mongols, and Renaissance Florence. There is a strong theme of sex and eroticism, much of it surrounding the Enchantress of the book's title, who was inspired by the Renaissance poem Orlando Furioso. There is also a recurring discussion of humanism and debate as opposed to authoritarianism, and Machiavelli is a character in the book.

Like Rushdie's previous works, the book can be considered a work of magic realism.

== Fictional characters ==
- Qara Köz, Lady Black Eyes, whom Rushdie cites as having been inspired by the (fictional) character Angelica in the epic poem Orlando innamorato.
- Hauksbank – fictional character may be based on Sir John Hawkwood, an English mercenary or condottiero in 14th-century Italy.

== Historical characters ==
=== Mughal Empire ===
- Akbar – Mughal emperor
- Maham Anaga – wet nurse of Akbar. She was the de facto regent of the Mughal state after the exclusion of Bairam Khan in 1560 until Akbar assumed full power in 1562 shortly before her death.
- Jodha Bai – Empress consort and favorite wife of Akbar, mother of prince Salim
- Adham Khan – Akbar's foster brother
- Babar – founder of the Mughal Empire, brother of Angelica
- Qutlugh Nigar Khanum – Babar's mother
- Khanzada Begum – Babar's sister
- Humayun – second Mughal Emperor, father of Akbar
- Gulbadan Begum – daughter of Babar, sister of Humayun, aunt of Akbar
- Khusrau Mirza – son of Prince Salim, grandson of Akbar and later Emperor Jahangir
- Abul Fazl – Akbar's chief advisor and author of Akbarnama, one of the Navaratnas, the nine gems in Akbar's court. He was originally Persian.
- Birbal – Grand Vizier (Wazīr-e Azam) of the Mughal court in the administration of Emperor Akbar, also one of the Navaratnas
- Tansen – Legendary Hindustani musician, well known for his voice and music
- Ali-Shir Nava'i – poet of Herat, author of "My Dark Eyed One"
- Mir Sayyid Ali – first master of Akbar's royal art studio
- Badauni - mystic and historian critical of Akbar's policies

=== Safavid dynasty ===
- Shah Ismail – Shah from 1501 to 1524 and victor of the battle of Marv, Turkmenistan

=== Ottoman Empire ===
- Sultan Mehmed II – Sultan of the Ottoman Empire for a short time from 1444 to 1446, and later from 1451 to 1481. He conquered Constantinople, bringing an end to the medieval Byzantine Empire.
- Bayezid II – Sultan of the Ottoman Empire from 1481 to 1512
- Selim I "the Grim" – son of Bayezid II and Sultan of the Ottoman Empire from 1512 to 1520
- Janissaries – infantry units that formed the Ottoman sultan's household troops and bodyguards

=== Western ===
- Amerigo Vespucci – explorer and cartographer after whom the Americas are named
- Niccolò Machiavelli – Italian diplomat, political philosopher, musician, poet and playwright
- Andrea Doria – Genoese admiral
- Giuliano de' Medici – reigned in Florence from 1512 to 1516
- Lorenzo de' Medici – Florentine ruler of the Republic of Florence, died of syphilis; Niccolò Machiavelli dedicated "The Prince" to him
- Girolamo Savonarola – Italian Dominican priest, fanatic, and leader of the Republic of Florence from 1494 until his execution in 1498

=== Other ===
- Muhammad Shaybani (birth name Shibägh "Wormwood") – Uzbek leader and Shaybanid descendant of Genghis Khan
- Vlad the Impaler, Prince of Wallachia (1448; 1456–1462; 1476)

== Publication and reception ==
The novel was published on 11 April 2008 by Jonathan Cape London, and in the United States by Random House.

Writing in The Guardian, Ursula K. Le Guin called it a "brilliant, fascinating, generous novel", and praised its "glamour and power, its humour and shock, its verve, its glory".
