= The Eleventh Hour (story collection) =

Five stories by Salman Rushdie, published 2025

The Eleventh Hour: A Quintet of Stories
- First edition (Jonathan Cape, 2025)
- Author: Salman Rushdie
- Genre: Shorter fiction
- Set in: India, England, United States
- Publisher: Jonathan Cape, Random House
- Publication date: 4 November 2025
- Publication place: London; New York City
- Pages: 272
- ISBN: 9781787336049 (Cape)

The Eleventh Hour: A Quintet of Stories is a collection of shorter fiction by writer Salman Rushdie. It was published on 4 November 2025 by Jonathan Cape in the UK and by Random House in the U.S.

Rushdie announced that he was working on a new work of fiction at the Lviv BookForum in October 2024. The collection contains Rushdie's first fiction written since the stabbing attack on 12 August 2022 that left him blind in one eye. (Note: The 2023 novel Victory City was completed some weeks before the attack.)

"The eleventh hour" is a phrase used in the Gospel of Matthew's Parable of the Workers in the Vineyard to signify the very end of the working day; in contemporary usage it means the last possible moment before it is too late. Rushdie explained that he was 78 at the time of publication and had survived "a fairly intimate encounter with death", and so the idea of running out of time was something that was on his mind.

== Contents ==
The Eleventh Hour contains three novellas and two shorter pieces, set in India, England and the United States. All five address the issues of age, mortality and memory.

- "In the South". Originally published in The New Yorker in 2009.
- "The Musician of Kahani"
- "Late"
- "Oklahoma"
- "The Old Man in the Piazza". Originally published in The New Yorker in 2020.

== Reception ==
Reviewing The Eleventh Hour in The Observer, critic Anthony Cummins described it as rambling and uneven, with "noise, bombast and the accumulation of references [serving] as substitutes for character, scene-setting and drama"; he singled out "The Musician of Kahani" – "simple but effective" – as by far the book's best offering. In The Guardian, Kevin Power praised "In the South" as a deft and moving anecdote while finding "Late" and "The Musician of Kahani" (which he described as a reprise of "Rushdie's greatest hits") entertaining but not particularly strong.
