= Languages of Truth =

Non-fiction book by Salman Rushdie

Languages of Truth: Essays 2003–2020
- First edition
- Author: Salman Rushdie
- Language: English
- Genre: Non-fiction, autobiography
- Published: May 2021
- Publisher: Penguin Random House
- ISBN: 0735279357

Languages of Truth is a collection of essays by Salman Rushdie. It was published in May 2021 by Random House.

== Overview ==
The book includes pieces written between 2003 and 2020, many of them never previously in print and engaging with a variety of subjects such as storytelling, literature, culture, myths, language, migration and censorship.

Rushdie begins the book with a sentence, "Before there were books, there were stories", and reflects on the art of storytelling and on his individual search for a narrative. A journey that took him beyond the realm of realism in order to create magical universes of alternative realities. In the book, Rushdie celebrates the potential of stories as catalysts for nourishing the imagination. He suggests that adults lose some of the awe children have for repeated stories with which they fall in love.

Languages of truth reflects on novels and novelists ranging from Leo Tolstoy, Philip Roth, Cervantes and Samuel Beckett to Kurt Vonnegut. There are also some pieces on painters like Amrita Sher-Gil and Bhupen Khakhar, as well as some mentions of directors like Federico Fellini and Danny Boyle.

In an interview about his book with Amanpour & Company, Rushdie says:

I grew up in India the immediate aftermath of British Empire, and what the British told people was the truth about that event was very rapidly proved to be something very unlike the truth. I mean I remember in India as a child the history books changing from the ones that the British had left behind, to the ones that had been written after independence; and people who had been characterized as villains, were now characterized as heroes, because of their part in the independence struggle. So truth is a battle, and maybe never more so than now.

== Reception ==
Languages of Truth was longlisted for PEN/Diamonstein-Spielvogel Award.

In a lukewarm review for The New York Times, Dwight Garner described the book as "a defensive castling move", referring to the author's suggestion that the turn in literary culture from brio-filled imaginative writing toward the humbler delights of "autofiction" is the reason for misunderstanding and mistreatment of his works. Garner compares the book with one of Rushdie's previous ones, Imaginary Homelands, saying: "Back then Rushdie wrote nonfiction for editors, not for foundations and colleges", and although then "he was not a major critic" he was "a strong one". Garner goes on to conclude: "If his arguments about the state of fiction in Languages of Truth don't convince, at least they're genuine signs of life."

Paul Perry, in The Independent, described the book as interesting, engaging and entertaining, mentioning that many of the essays were delivered as lectures and "even though they have been revised for print they maintain a kind of erudite breeziness in their tone".

== Contents ==
Part 1

- Wonder Tales (3)
- Proteus (30)
- Heraclitus (47)
- Another Writer’s Beginnings (62)

Part 2

- Philip Roth (85)
- Kurt Vonnegut and Slaughterhouse-Five (101)
- Samuel Beckett’s Novels (111)
- Cervantes and Shakespeare (117)
- Gabo and I (120)
- Harold Pinter (1930-2008) (133)
- Introduction to the Paris Review Interviews, Vol. IV (143)
- Autobiography and the Novel (148)
- Adaptation (166)
- Notes on Sloth: From Saligia to Oblomov (183)
- Hans Christian Andersen (195)
- King of the World by David Remnick (199)
- Very Well Then I Contradict Myself (205)

Part 3

- Truth (211)
- Courage (215)
- Texts for Pen (220)
- 1 The Pen and the Sword (220)
- 2 The Birth of Pen World Voices (224)
- 3 The Arthur Miller Lecture, 2012 (226)
- 4 Pen World Voices Opening Night 2014 (230)
- 5 Pen World Voices Opening Night 2017 (234)
- Christopher Hitchens (1949-2011) (237)
- The Liberty Instinct (243)
- Osama Bin Laden (257)
- AI Weiwei and Others (261)
- The Half-Woman God (265)
- Nova Southeastern University Commencement Address, 2006 (274)
- Emory University Commencement Address, 2015 (279)

Part 4

- The Composite Artist: The Emperor Akbar and the Making of the Hamzanama (285)
- Amrita Sher-Gil: Letters (302)
- Bhupen Khakhar (1934-2003) (309)
- Being Francesco Clemente: Self-Portraits, Gagosian Gallery, London, 2005 (312)
- Taryn Simon: An American Index of the Hidden and Unfamiliar, Whitney Museum, New York, 2007 (319)
- Kara Walker at the Hammer Museum, Los Angeles, 2009 (325)
- Sebastião Salgado (328)
- The Unbeliever’s Christmas (331)
- Carrie Fisher (335)
- Pandemic: A Personal Engagement with the Coronavirus (339)
- The Proust Questionnaire: Vanity Fair (351)
- About These Texts (353)
