= In the South =

In the South may refer to:

- In the South (Alassio), a 1903 concert overture by Edward Elgar
- "In the South" (short story), a 2009 work of fiction by Salman Rushdie
