= Victory City =

2023 novel by Salman Rushdie

- Author: Salman Rushdie
- Language: English
- Genre: Literary Fiction/ Science Fiction & Fantasy
- Publisher: Random House
- Publication date: 7 February 2023
- Publication place: United Kingdom
- Media type: Print (Hardcover)
- Pages: 352
- ISBN: 9780593243398
- OCLC: 1317339930
- Preceded by: Quichotte

Victory City is a novel by Salman Rushdie published in February 2023. It is Rushdie's fifteenth novel.

== Writing and publication ==
Ahead of publication, it was announced that due to the attack on Rushdie in 2022, he would not be promoting the novel in public, though he did publish several tweets and speak to The New Yorker and WNYC Studios about it. The novel was finished before Rushdie was attacked. The writer's 15th novel was commemorated with a virtual launch hosted by Margaret Atwood and Neil Gaiman.

== Summary ==
Victory City is framed as a fictional translation of an epic originally written in Sanskrit. The focaliser and protagonist is Pampa Kampana, partly inspired by the historical, fourteenth-century princess-poetess Gangadevi, who is given (or cursed with) a 247-year lifespan. Through her magical powers, she wills into existence the empire Bisnaga, and its capital city of the same name, inspired largely by the historical fourteenth- to sixteenth-century Empire of Vijayanagara, and rules it as what one review calls "a sort of feminist utopia", variously as a minister, regent, and queen consort, for over two hundred years. Covering multiple generations, her reign includes having affairs with Portuguese adventurers and turning people into animals with her spells. Eventually, Bisnaga is brought down by political intrigue, competing neighbours, and religious bigotry.

== Plot summary ==
At age nine, Pampa Kampana's mother and all the women of her village self-immolate following their husbands' death in battle. Following the tragedy a goddess, also called Pampa Kampana, enters Pampa’s body granting supernatural abilities such as foresight and sorcery along with a prolonged life span. Soon after, she takes refuge in a cave with a holy man and is later visited by the brothers Hukka and Bukka Sangama, cowherds turned soldiers, who were on the run after escaping slavery.

Pampa gives the brothers a bag of seeds, and instructs them to sow these at the site of her old village. The brothers do so and soon a "miracle city" full of lavish palaces and temples along with people sprouts from the earth. Hukka and Bukka crown themselves the first kings of the city and Pampa arrives to whisper memories into the people born from her seeds. Pampa married them each in turn, though her true love was a Portuguese horse trader who gives the magic city its name, Bisnaga.

Pampa first bears three girls and later sons. During the reign of her second husband, Bukka, she requests that her daughters have the right to the throne, going against the norm of male heirs being the sole inheritors. As an avid advocate for gender equality Pampa views this change as necessary to upholding the values of the kingdom. This request is met with much conflict but eventually Bukka agrees and later sends their sons into exile for their insolence.

Some years later, following the death of Bukka, the sons return to Bisnaga and seize control of the kingdom with the help of their uncles. Pampa and her three daughters are forced to flee into a magical forest where they shelter for several decades. The three daughters eventually grow in separate directions and Pampa returns to Bisnaga. With the passing of time she has been relegated to legend and is free to move about the city freely. Eventually, through the assistance of friends, she makes her way into the inner circle of the latest monarch, Krishnadevaraya, of the city and becomes his advisor.

Following a string of wars and unfortunate deaths, the latest king goes mad and Pampa, caught in one of his rages, is forcefully blinded with an iron-rod. The residents of the city become outraged at this betrayal and turn against their king. Pampa once again takes up refuge with a holy man and finally beginning to feel her age, lives out her days confined in her room.

The kingdom degrades into its final stages following Krishnadevaraya's death, and after the final monarch's death in battle Bisnaga is ransacked and destroyed. The novel ends with Pampa burying her written history in a pot and waiting for the Goddess to release her so that she may die.

== Key characters ==
- Pampa Kampana – main character and matriarch of Bisnaga.
- Hukka Sangama – the first king of Bisnaga, older brother of Bukka.
- Bukka Sangama – the second king of Bisnaga, younger brother of Hukka.
- Vidyasagar – a religious leader who shelters Pampa within his cave following her mother's death. During this time he sexually abuses her, leading her to develop a great hatred for him. Their conflicting beliefs on religion, sexuality and gender roles pit them against each other as bitter rivals.
- Domingo Nunes – a Portuguese horse trader turned advisor. Pampa's first love and most likely the father to her three daughters.
- Haleya Kote – close advisor and ally to Pampa Kampana.
- Yuktasri – one of Pampa Kampana's daughters.
- Yotshna – one of Pampa Kampana's daughters.
- Zerelda – one of Pampa Kampana's daughters.
- Krishnadevaraya – the 18th, self-styled god king of Bisnaga.

== Critical reception ==
The Harvard Crimson's review hailed the book as a masterclass in foreshadowing and character development, further adding that "Victory City is a bold confrontation of religion, history and tradition interwoven with a contemporary critique of our world."
