= Joseph Anton: A Memoir =

Autobiographical book by Salman Rushdie

- First edition
- Author: Salman Rushdie
- Language: English
- Genre: Memoir
- Publication place: United Kingdom

Joseph Anton: A Memoir is an autobiographical book by the British Indian writer Salman Rushdie, first published in September 2012 by Random House. Rushdie recounts his time in hiding from ongoing threats to his life.

Rushdie's 1988 novel The Satanic Verses had led to a widespread controversy among Muslims, prompting the 1989 fatwa issued by Ayatollah Khomeini, the Supreme Leader of Iran. Rushdie began to use "Joseph Anton" as a pseudonym; Rushdie chose the alias to honor the writers Joseph Conrad and Anton Chekhov.

The memoir also discusses other aspects of his personal life, such as his friendship with other writers including Bruce Chatwin, Paul Theroux, Bill Buford, and Martin Amis, as well as public figures such as Alan Yentob. It also includes the story of the break-up of his relationship with his second wife, Marianne Wiggins, and the acrimonious nature of their split, and his third and fourth marriages (and break-ups) to Elizabeth West and Padma Lakshmi.

Rushdie writes about his period living as "Joseph Anton" in the third rather than the first person.

The book was announced as one of the 14 titles in the longlist for the 2012 Samuel Johnson Prize on 18 September 2012.
