= Shame (Rushdie novel) =

1983 novel by Salman Rushdie

- First edition
- Author: Salman Rushdie
- Language: English
- Genre: Magic realism
- Publisher: Jonathan Cape
- Publication date: 8 September 1983
- Publication place: United Kingdom
- Media type: Print (Hardcover, Paperback)
- Pages: 317 (1983 edition)
- ISBN: 978-0-224-02952-0
- OCLC: 9646560
- Dewey Decimal: 823 19
- LC Class: PR6068.U757 S5 1983

Shame is Salman Rushdie's third novel, published in 1983. This book was written out of a desire to approach the problem of "artificial" (other-made) country divisions, their residents' complicity, and the problems of post-colonialism when Pakistan was created to separate the Muslims from the Hindus after Britain gave up control of India.

The book is written in the style of magic realism. It portrays the lives of Iskander Harappa (sometimes assumed to be Zulfikar Ali Bhutto), and General Raza Hyder (sometimes assumed to be General Muhammad Zia-ul-Haq), and their relationship. The central theme of the novel is that begetting "shame" begets violence. The concepts of 'shame' and 'shamelessness' are explored through all of the characters, with the main focus being on Sufiya Zinobia and Omar Khayyám.

== Plot ==
This story takes place in a town called "Q" which is actually a fictitious version of Quetta, Pakistan. In Q, one of the three sisters (Chunni, Munnee, and Bunny Shakil) gives birth to Omar Khayyám Shakil, but they act as a unit of mothers, never revealing to anyone who is Omar's birth mother. In addition, Omar never learns who his father is. While growing up, Omar lives in purdah with his three mothers and yearns to join the world. As a birthday present one year, Omar's "mothers" allow him to leave Q. He enrolls in a school and is convinced by his tutor (Eduardo Rodriguez) to become a doctor. Over time, he comes in contact with both Iskander Harappa and General Raza Hyder.

== Characters ==
=== Shakil family ===
- Omar Khayyám Shakil – The main character of the story who is raised by Chunni, Munnee, and Bunny.
- Chunni, Munnee, and Bunny Shakil – Mothers of Omar Khayyám who were pregnant simultaneously.
- Babar Shakil – The second son of Chunni, Munnee, and Bunny Shakil.

=== Hyder family members ===
- Raza Hyder – A military man who marries Bilquis as a captain and is eventually promoted to General. He is also the murderer of Babar Shakil.
- Bilquìs Hyder – Wife of Raza Hyder and mother of Sufiya Zinobia and Naveed Hyder.
- Sufiya Zinobia Hyder – Daughter of Raza and Bilquìs Hyder. Born with developmental issues. Embodies shame. Marries Omar Khayyám Shakil.
- Naveed “Good News” Hyder – Younger sister of Sufiya Zinobia Hyder who is promised to Haroun Harappa but marries Captain Talvar Ulhaq.

=== Harappa family members ===
- Iskander Harappa – Politician and "playboy" who is married to Rani Harappa. Once a country leader, overthrown by Raza Hyder and dies in jail.
- Rani Harappa – Cousin of Raza Hyder and wife of Iskander Harappa.
- Arjumand Harappa – Daughter of Iskander and Rani, an aspiring politician, modeled after Benazir Bhutto.
- Haroun Harappa – The eldest son of Little Mir Harappa, who is promised to wed Naveed Hyder.

=== Additional characters ===
- Atiyah "Pinkie" Aurangzeb – Widowed by President Marshall A. and has an affair with Iskander Harappa.
- Captain Talvar Ulhaq – Police captain and polo player who marries Naveed Hyder.
- Eduardo Rodrigues – A Dominican teacher who becomes the private tutor of Omar Khayyám Shakil. He also is foster father to a child, Omar has with Farah, Omar's childhood crush.
- Farah Zoroaster – Daughter of a customs officer. Has a child with Omar but is taken care of by Eduardo Rodrigues and is Omar Khayyám Shakil's childhood crush.
- Maulana Dawood – Mullah and political confidant of Raza Hyder.

== Awards ==
- Winner of the French Prix du Meilleur Livre Étranger (Best Foreign Book Prize).
- Shortlisted for the 1983 Booker Prize.
- The Persian translation received an award from an official jury appointed by a ministry of the Iranian Islamic government.

== See also ==
- Indian English literature
- Postcolonial literature

== Bibliography ==
Rushdie, Salman. Shame. Vintage: London, 1995.
