= The Butterfly Hunter =

Unpublished novel by Max Malik

- Author: Max Malik
- Language: English
- Genre: Novel
- Publisher: unpublished
- Publication date: To be confirmed
- Publication place: United Kingdom

The Butterfly Hunter is the unpublished debut novel by Birmingham-based British writer Max Malik, which has drawn comparisons with Salman Rushdie's controversial work The Satanic Verses. The Butterfly Hunter was completed in 2008, and submitted by the author to the Muslim Writers Awards in 2008, as an entry in the Novel category. The author was winner of the Muslim Writer of the Year Award in 2007, and the organisers of the Awards project described his 2008 submission as "one of the best" received. The Butterfly Hunter was a shortlisted nominee in the Novel category of the Muslim Writers Awards in 2008, along with four other works. However, the book was never submitted to the independent judging panel tasked with adjudicating competition entries.

This omission of The Butterfly Hunter from the judging process has caused much public controversy. The author has claimed that the novel was censored by the Muslim Writers Awards due to its controversial content. However, the organisers of the Awards have strenuously denied the accusation, and have insisted that the matter is under investigation. The organisers have also stated that the omission is likely to have been an oversight, although this claim has met with some public cynicism.

The narrative centres around two British protagonists, Jimmy and Jessica, who become involved in a terrorist plot and are recruited by extremists and become suicide bombers. The novel includes several controversial characters and plot-lines, including sexual abuse of children by a Mosque teacher and a bisexual Imam who habitually hires rent boys.

Despite the controversy, and his belief that the organisers of the Muslim Writers Awards found his work "unpalatable", Malik has insisted that the book should not be regarded as "the second coming of The Satanic Verses, as he believes that the novel is "neither blasphemous nor disrespectful towards any particular group or individual."

== Sources ==
- Official website for The Butterfly Hunter
- Muslim author hits out at novel 'censorship', The Asian Today
