= The Jaguar Smile =

1987 nonfiction book by Salman Rushdie

- First edition
- Author: Salman Rushdie
- Language: English
- Genre: Travel writing
- Publisher: Viking Press
- Publication date: 30 January 1987
- Publication place: United Kingdom
- Media type: Print (hardback and paperback)
- Pages: 176
- ISBN: 0670817570
- OCLC: 14964963
- Dewey Decimal: 917.28504/53 21
- LC Class: F1524 .R87 1987

The Jaguar Smile is Salman Rushdie's first full-length non-fiction book, which he wrote in 1987 after visiting Nicaragua. The book is subtitled A Nicaraguan Journey and relates his travel experiences, the people he met as well as views on the political situation then facing the country. The book was written during a break the author took from writing his controversial novel The Satanic Verses.

== Background ==
After a period of political and economic turmoil under dictator Anastasio Somoza Debayle, the leftist Sandinista National Liberation Front (commonly known by the initial FSLN or as the Sandinistas) came to power in Nicaragua in 1979 supported by much of the populace and elements of the Catholic church. The government was initially backed by the U.S. under President Jimmy Carter, but the support evaporated under the presidency of Ronald Reagan in light of evidence that the Sandinistas were providing help to the FMLN rebels in El Salvador. The U.S. imposed economic sanctions and a trade embargo instead which contributed to the collapse of the Nicaraguan economy in the early to mid-1980s. While the Soviet Union and Cuba funded the Nicaraguan army, the U.S. financed the Contras in neighboring Honduras with a view towards establishing a friendly government in Nicaragua. Nicaragua won a historic case against the U.S. at the International Court of Justice in 1986 (see Nicaragua v. United States), and the U.S. was ordered to pay Nicaragua some $12 billion in reparations for undermining the nation's sovereignty.

It was during that period that Rushdie visited Nicaragua on the occasion of the seventh anniversary of the Sandinistas' rise to power.

== Rushdie's trip and observations ==
Rushdie's three-week trip to Nicaragua in the summer of 1986 was at the invitation of the Sandinista Association of Cultural Workers which was billed as, "the umbrella organisation that brought writers, artists, musicians, craftspeople, dancers and so on, together under the same roof".

== Reviews and reception ==
In the review in Time, British writer Pico Iyer praised Rushdie's account that was "quickened by a novelist's eye". However, he believed that Rushdie was quick to overlook Sandinista totalitarianism and censorship due to his ideological sympathies with their cause. Predicting the readers' expected response, Iyer said, "Since his own views seem largely unchanged by what he encounters, the tourist is unlikely to change the views of his readers. Those who share his assumptions will be reassured by his brief; those who do not will be outraged by it."
