= East, West =

Short story collection by Salman Rushdie

- First edition (publ. Jonathan Cape)
- Author: Salman Rushdie
- Genre: Short stories
- Publisher: Jonathan Cape
- Publication date: 1994
- ISBN: 0-394-28150-0
- Website: East, West

East, West is a 1994 anthology of short stories by Salman Rushdie. The book is divided into three main sections, entitled "East", "West", and "East, West", each section containing stories from their respective geographical areas (in the "East, West" section both worlds are influenced by each other). Though Rushdie himself never divulged the exact inspirations for his stories in East, West, it is commonly thought that the central themes of each of his stories are drawn from his personal experiences as an immigrant in England during the time of the fatwas issued against his life. Rushdie weaves in many pop cultural references into his stories, just as television and Western media such as MTV and movies like Rambo have become popular throughout the world and on the Indian subcontinent. The influence and travels of Indians and Indian culture is also shown in the West.

== Contents ==
=== East ===
- Good Advice Is Rarer Than Rubies – A young woman attends the Consulate so she may join her husband from an arranged marriage in England, only to derail her interview with incorrect answers, in order to remain in India as an independent woman.
- The Free Radio – Examines government attempts during the State of Emergency to address high birth rates by sterilising poor men.
- The Prophet's Hair – A moneylender is driven mad after finding a stolen lock of the Prophet's hair. His family enlists an infamous burglar to steal it, in the hopes that the moneylender will regain his sanity once he is separated from it.

=== West ===
- Yorick – A fictionalised account of the childhood life of Prince Hamlet and his father's court jester Yorick, which then proceeds to influence the events of Shakespeare's Hamlet.
- At The Auction of the Ruby Slippers – Various members of a destitute world attend an auction to bid for the ruby slippers of Dorothy Gale in The Wizard of Oz, in the hope their transformative powers will help them achieve personal and political ends.
- Christopher Columbus and Queen Isabella of Spain Consummate Their Relationship (Santa Fé, AD 1492) – Christopher Columbus waits in desperation for his patron Queen Isabella to agree to sponsor his voyage to the edge of the known world.

=== East, West ===
- The Harmony of the Spheres – The protagonist reflects on his relationship with a friend whose schizophrenia leads to his suicide.
- Chekov and Zulu – Two friends with codenames Pavel Chekov and Hikaru Sulu are involved in a mission to collect intelligence on radical Sikhs in Britain following Indira Gandhi's assassination.
- The Courter – A teenage boy retells the story of the Indian woman who raised him and his siblings, and her relationship with the 'porter' of their building, whose title she mispronounces as 'courter'.
