= Shalimar the Clown =

2005 novel by Salman Rushdie

- First edition
- Author: Salman Rushdie
- Language: English
- Publisher: Jonathan Cape
- Publication date: 6 September 2005
- Publication place: United Kingdom
- Media type: Print (hardback)
- Pages: 398 pp. (first edition, hardback)
- Awards: Man Booker Prize Nominee for Longlist (2005), Vodafone Crossword Book Award for Fiction (2005)
- ISBN: 978-0224077842
- OCLC: 61855166
- Preceded by: Fury
- Followed by: The Enchantress of Florence

Shalimar the Clown is a 2005 novel by British author Salman Rushdie. The novel took Rushdie four years to write, and was initially published on 6 September 2005 by Jonathan Cape. Shalimar the Clown derives its name from Shalimar Garden, in the vicinity of Srinagar. Shalimar is one of several Mughal Gardens, which were laid out in several parts of undivided India when the Mughals reigned over the subcontinent. Shalimar is also the name of one of the characters featured in the novel. Shalimar the Clown won the 2005 Vodafone Crossword Book Award and was one of the finalists for the 2005 Whitbread Book Awards.

== Setting ==
The novel is based partly in a small town in the region of Kashmir. The town itself is imaginary, but it is located in an accurate geographic location not far from Srinagar.

The title refers to a character in the story, a Kashmiri villager named Shalimar, who performs a tightrope act for the amusement of the other villagers.

== Plot summary ==
The central character, India, is the illegitimate child of a former United States ambassador to India, Maximilian Ophuls. Although a number of narratives and incidents in the novel revolve around Kashmir, the novel opens in Los Angeles. Max Ophuls, a US diplomat who has worked in the Kashmir Valley, is murdered by his former chauffeur, Shalimar.

Several flashbacks take the readers to the past, and one learns that Shalimar was once full of affection, love and laughter. He lived in the fictional Kashmiri village of Pachigam. His skill on the tight rope has earned him renown in his village and the nickname Shalimar the clown. At a young age, he falls in love with a beautiful Kashmiri Pandit girl, named Boonyi. The village elders agree to the marriage and all seems fine, except that Boonyi doesn't want to remain stuck in this small village. Things come to a head when Maximilian comes to the village, sees Boonyi dance, and becomes enamored of her. With the help of his assistant, he gets her a flat in Delhi, and an affair blossoms. A scandal erupts when Boonyi gets pregnant and Max is forced to return. The child, India, is brought to England by Maximilian's wife.

Shalimar was deeply in love with Boonyi and couldn't bear her betrayal. He devotes the rest of his life to taking revenge on the people that were the cause of his unhappiness. For this purpose he joins up with various Jihadi organisations and becomes a renowned assassin.

Maximilian, the son of Ashkenazi Jews, was raised in France. Following the death of his parents in a Nazi concentration camp, he becomes a hero of the French resistance. A fictionalised account of the Bugatti automobile company plays a role in his escape from the Nazis. Following the war, he marries a British aristocrat, and eventually becomes American ambassador to India. This appointment eventually leads to his unspecified role in relation to American counter-terrorism. The appointment is more important than his ambassadorship, but his exact role is left vague.

Shalimar receives training from insurgent groups in Afghanistan and the Philippines, and leaves for the USA. He murders Max on the day he resigns as his driver. Shalimar evades the authorities and eventually returns to India's home, with the intention of killing her.

The story portrays the paradise that once was Kashmir, and how the politics of the sub-continent ripped apart the lives of those caught in the middle of the battleground.

== Reception ==
=== Critical reception ===
Reviewing the novel in The Guardian, Natasha Walter thought that the best parts of the book was those set in Kashmir: "Shalimar and Boonyi's youth and family background are realised with humour and sensual detail. And the destruction of Kashmir is the true heart of this book. When dealing with that tragedy Rushdie's style is genuinely passionate; this is a paean of love to a destroyed homeland. By contrast, when Rushdie journeys into the past of Max Ophuls the tale becomes coldly decorative". Jason Cowley in The Observer said that it was "Rushdie's most engaging book since Midnight's Children. It is a lament. It is a revenge story. It is a love story. And it is a warning - to Muslims and to secular pluralists alike." Michiko Kakutani in The New York Times was more critical and described Rushdie's prose as "clotted and clichéd".

== Adaptations ==
The novel was adapted as an opera, with music by Jack Perla and a libretto by Rajiv Joseph, which premiered at Opera Theater of St. Louis in 2016. The principal roles were taken by Sean Panikkar, Andriana Chuchman, Gregory Dahl, and Katharine Goeldner; smaller parts were played by Aubrey Allicock and Thomas Hammons, among others. The performance was conducted by Jayce Ogren. A recording of the opera was subsequently released by Albany Records.
