= Imaginary Homelands =

Essay collection including commonwealth literature does not exist

- First edition cover
- Author: Salman Rushdie
- Publisher: Granta in association with Penguin Books
- Publication date: 1991
- ISBN: 9780140140361

Imaginary Homelands is a collection of essays and criticism by Salman Rushdie.

The collection is composed of essays written between 1981 and 1991, including pieces of political criticism – e.g. on the assassination of Indira Gandhi, the Conservative 1983 General Election victory, censorship, the Labour Party, and Palestinian identity – as well as literary criticism – e.g. on V. S. Naipaul, Graham Greene, Julian Barnes, and Kazuo Ishiguro among others.

The title essay – "Imaginary Homelands" – was originally published in the London Review of Books on 7 October 1982. Comparing his work Midnight's Children to other works that draw on diaspora as a central theme, Rushdie argues that the migrant – whether from one country to another, from one language or culture to another or even from a traditional rural society to a modern metropolis – "is, perhaps, the central or defining figure of the twentieth century."
