= Salman Rushdie =

Indian-British-American novelist (born 1947)

Sir Salman Rushdie CH FRSL
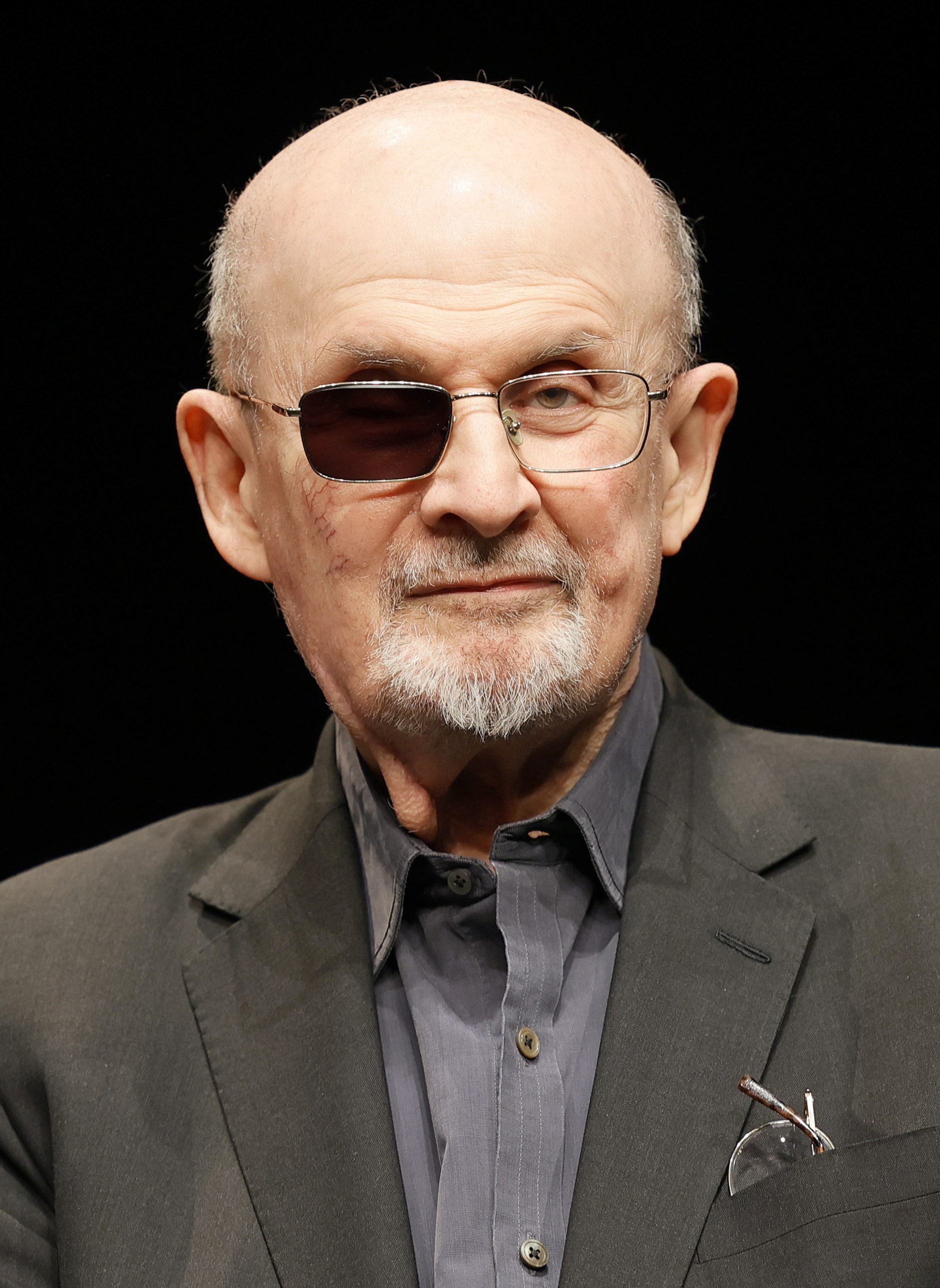
- Rushdie in 2024
- Born: Ahmed Salman Rushdie; 19 June 1947 (age 79); Bombay, British India
- Citizenship: India (until 1964); UK (from 1964); US (from 2016)
- Education: King's College, Cambridge (BA)
- Occupations: Writer; professor
- Spouses: Clarissa Luard (m. 1976; div. 1987) Marianne Wiggins (m. 1988; div. 1993) Elizabeth West (m. 1997; div. 2004) Padma Lakshmi (m. 2004; div. 2007) Rachel Eliza Griffiths (m. 2021)
- Children: 2
- Relatives: Mishka Rushdie Momen (niece) Natalie Rushdie (daughter-in-law)
- Writing career
- Genres: Magical realism; satire; postcolonialism
- Subjects: Historical criticism; travel writing
- Website: salmanrushdie.com

Sir Ahmed Salman Rushdie (Note: /sʌlˈmɑːn ˈrʊʃdi/ sul-MAHN RUUSH-dee) (born 19 June 1947) is an Indian-born British and American novelist. His work often combines magical realism with historical fiction and primarily deals with connections, disruptions, and migrations between Eastern and Western civilizations. His novels are typically set on the Indian subcontinent, feature an Indian protagonist, and/or portray Indian familial relationships. Rushdie's second novel, Midnight's Children (1981), won the Booker Prize in 1981 and was deemed to be "the best novel of all winners" on two occasions that marked the 25th and the 40th anniversary of the prize.

After his fourth novel, The Satanic Verses (1988), Rushdie became the subject of several assassination attempts and death threats because of what was seen by some to be an irreverent depiction of Muhammad. The controversy involving the Satanic Verses included a fatwa calling for his death issued by Ruhollah Khomeini, the supreme leader of Iran. The book was banned in 20 countries. Numerous killings and bombings have been carried out by extremists who cited the book as motivation, sparking a debate about censorship and religiously motivated violence. In 2022, Rushdie survived a stabbing at the Chautauqua Institution that led to loss of his right eye and inflicted damage to his liver and hands.

Rushdie was educated at King's College at the University of Cambridge, where he graduated with a degree in history in 1968. In 1983, Rushdie was elected a fellow of the Royal Society of Literature. He was appointed a Commandeur de l'Ordre des Arts et des Lettres of France in 1999. Rushdie was knighted in 2007 for his services to literature. In 2008, The Times ranked him 13th on its list of the 50 greatest British writers since 1945. Rushdie was named Distinguished Writer in Residence at the Arthur L. Carter Journalism Institute of New York University in 2015. Earlier, he taught at Emory University. In 2008, he was elected to the American Academy of Arts and Letters. In 2012, Rushdie published Joseph Anton: A Memoir, an account of his life in the wake of the events following The Satanic Verses. He was named one of the 100 most influential people in the world by Time magazine in April 2023.

Since 2000, Rushdie has lived in the United States. He has been married five times. From 2004 to 2007, he was married to Indian-American television presenter and model Padma Lakshmi.

== Early life ==
Rushdie was born into a Kashmiri Muslim family on 19 June 1947 in Bombay, now known as Mumbai, in British India. He is the son of Anis Ahmed Rushdie, a Cambridge-educated lawyer-turned-businessman, and Negin Bhatt, a teacher. His father was dismissed from the Indian Civil Services (ICS) after it emerged that the birth certificate submitted by him had changes to make him appear younger than he was. Rushdie has three sisters. He wrote in his memoir, Joseph Anton, that his father adopted the name Rushdie in honour of Ibn Rushd. Rushdie recalled his "first literary influence": "When I first saw The Wizard of Oz it made a writer of me." He recalled: "Every child in India in my day (and probably still) was obsessed with P. G. Wodehouse and Agatha Christie. I read mountains of books by both." Rushdie has his ancestral home built by his grandfather named Anees Villa in Solan, Himachal Pradesh.

Rushdie also recalled that "Alice captured my imagination as few other books did: both the books, not just Alice's Adventures in Wonderland but Through the Looking-Glass as well, and I can still recite the whole of "Jabberwocky" and "The Walrus and the Carpenter" from memory. I also loved the Swallows and Amazons series by Arthur Ransome because of the unimaginable freedom those young people sailing in the Lake District were given by their families ... When I was 16, I read The Lord Of The Rings and became obsessed, and can still recite the inscription on the Ruling Ring ('One ring to rule them all...') in the dark language of Mordor. I read an astonishing amount of Golden Age science fiction, not just Ray Bradbury, Arthur C. Clarke and Kurt Vonnegut but more arcane writers like Clifford D. Simak, James Blish, Zenna Henderson and L. Sprague de Camp." He has written about his family following the Indian custom of kissing holy books if they were dropped on the floor. "But we kissed everything. We kissed dictionaries and atlases. We kissed Enid Blyton novels and Superman comics. If I'd ever dropped the telephone directory I'd probably have kissed that, too."

While in India, Rushdie was educated at the Cathedral and John Connon School. He immigrated to England in 1961 and attended Rugby School. He then attended Cambridge as an undergraduate student at King's College, graduating in 1968 with a Bachelor of Arts degree in history.

== Career ==
=== Copywriter ===
Rushdie worked as a copywriter for the advertising agency Ogilvy & Mather, where he came up with "irresistibubble" for Aero and "Naughty but Nice" for cream cakes, and for the agency Ayer Barker (until 1982), for whom he wrote the line "That'll do nicely" for American Express. Collaborating with musician Ronnie Bond, Rushdie wrote the words for an advertising record on behalf of the now defunct Burnley Building Society that was recorded at Good Earth Studios, London. The song was called "The Best Dreams" and was sung by George Chandler. It was while at Ogilvy that Rushdie wrote Midnight's Children, before becoming a full-time writer. Rushdie was a personal friend of Angela Carter's, calling her "the first great writer I ever met".

=== Literary works ===
Rushdie's works are often categorized as postmodern, particularly within the tradition of Magic Realism. However, they also reveal early signs of a literary and cultural shift beyond postmodernism. In our contemporary world – saturated with reality TV, talk shows and other forms of pure entertainment – apathy, passivity and inaction have become defining features. Jeffrey T. Nealon identifies this prevailing sense of disengagement as a hallmark of the post-postmodern condition, which is sometimes referred to as metamodernism: "we post-postmodern capitalists are trained by our media masters to watch rather than act, consume rather than do."

==== Early works and literary breakthrough, 1975–1987 ====
Rushdie's debut, the science fiction tale Grimus (1975), was considered for a science-fiction award by Kingsley Amis, Arthur C Clarke and Brian Aldiss, but was otherwise unsuccessful. His next novel, Midnight's Children (1981) follows the life of Saleem Sinai, born at the stroke of midnight as India gained its independence, who is endowed with special powers and a connection to other children born at the birth of the modern nation of India. Sinai has been compared to Rushdie. However, Rushdie refuted the idea of having written any of his characters as autobiographical, stating, "People assume that because certain things in the character are drawn from your own experience, it just becomes you. In that sense, I've never felt that I've written an autobiographical character." Rushdie writes of his "debt to the oral narrative traditions of India and also to the great novelists Jane Austen and Charles Dickens—Austen for her portraits of brilliant women caged by the social convention of their time, women whose Indian counterparts I knew well; Dickens for his great, rotting, Bombay-like city, and his ability to root his larger-than-life characters and surrealist imagery in a sharply observed, almost hyperrealistic background."

Shortly after its publication, V. S. Pritchett wrote: "In Salman Rushdie, the author of Midnight's Children, India has produced a glittering novelist—one with startling imaginative and intellectual resources, a master of perpetual storytelling. Like García Marquez in One Hundred Years of Solitude, he weaves a whole people's capacity for carrying its inherited myths—and new ones that it goes on generating—into a kind of magic carpet. The human swarm swarms in every man and woman as they make their bid for life and vanish into the passion or hallucination that hangs about them like the smell of India itself. Yet at the same time there are strange Western echoes, of the irony of Sterne in Tristram Shandy—that early nonlinear writer—in Rushdie's readiness to tease by breaking off or digressing at the gravest moments. This is very odd in an Indian novel! The book is really about the mystery of being born and the puzzle of who one is." Midnight's Children won the 1981 Booker Prize and, in 1993 and 2008, the Best of the Bookers and Booker of Bookers special prizes. In 2003, Rushdie worked with Tim Supple and Simon Reade on a stage adaptation of the novel.

After Indian premier Indira Gandhi sued Rushdie for defamation over a portion regarding her, he removed the portion.

After Midnight's Children, Rushdie depicted the political turmoil in Pakistan with Shame (1983), basing his characters on Zulfikar Ali Bhutto and General Muhammad Zia-ul-Haq. Shame won France's Prix du Meilleur Livre Étranger (Best Foreign Book) and was a close runner-up for the Booker Prize. Both these works of postcolonial literature are characterised by a style of magic realism and the immigrant outlook that Rushdie is very conscious of as a member of the Kashmiri diaspora.

Rushdie wrote a non-fiction book about Nicaragua in 1987 called The Jaguar Smile. This book has a political focus and is based on his first-hand experiences and research at the scene of Sandinista political experiments. He became interested in Nicaragua after he had been a neighbour of Madame Somoza, wife of the former Nicaraguan dictator, and his son Zafar was born around the time of the Nicaraguan revolution.

==== The Satanic Verses and Haroun and the Sea of Stories, 1988–1990 ====
The Satanic Verses, was published in 1988 and won the Whitbread Award. The book was highly controversial. Ruhollah Khomeini issued a fatwa calling for Rushdie's execution, and the author went into hiding. The Satanic Verses was followed by Haroun and the Sea of Stories (1990). Written whilst the fatwa was in effect, it is a children's book about the magic of story-telling.

==== Further works, 1990s–2000s ====
In 1990, Rushdie reviewed Thomas Pynchon's Vineland in The New York Times, and offered some droll musings on the author's reclusiveness: "So he wants a private life and no photographs and nobody to know his home address. I can dig it, I can relate to that (but, like, he should try it when it's compulsory instead of a free-choice option)." Rushdie recalls: "I was able to meet the famously invisible man. I had dinner with him at Sonny Mehta's apartment in Manhattan and found him very satisfyingly Pynchonesque. At the end of dinner I thought, well, now we're friends, and maybe we'll see each other from time to time. He never called again."

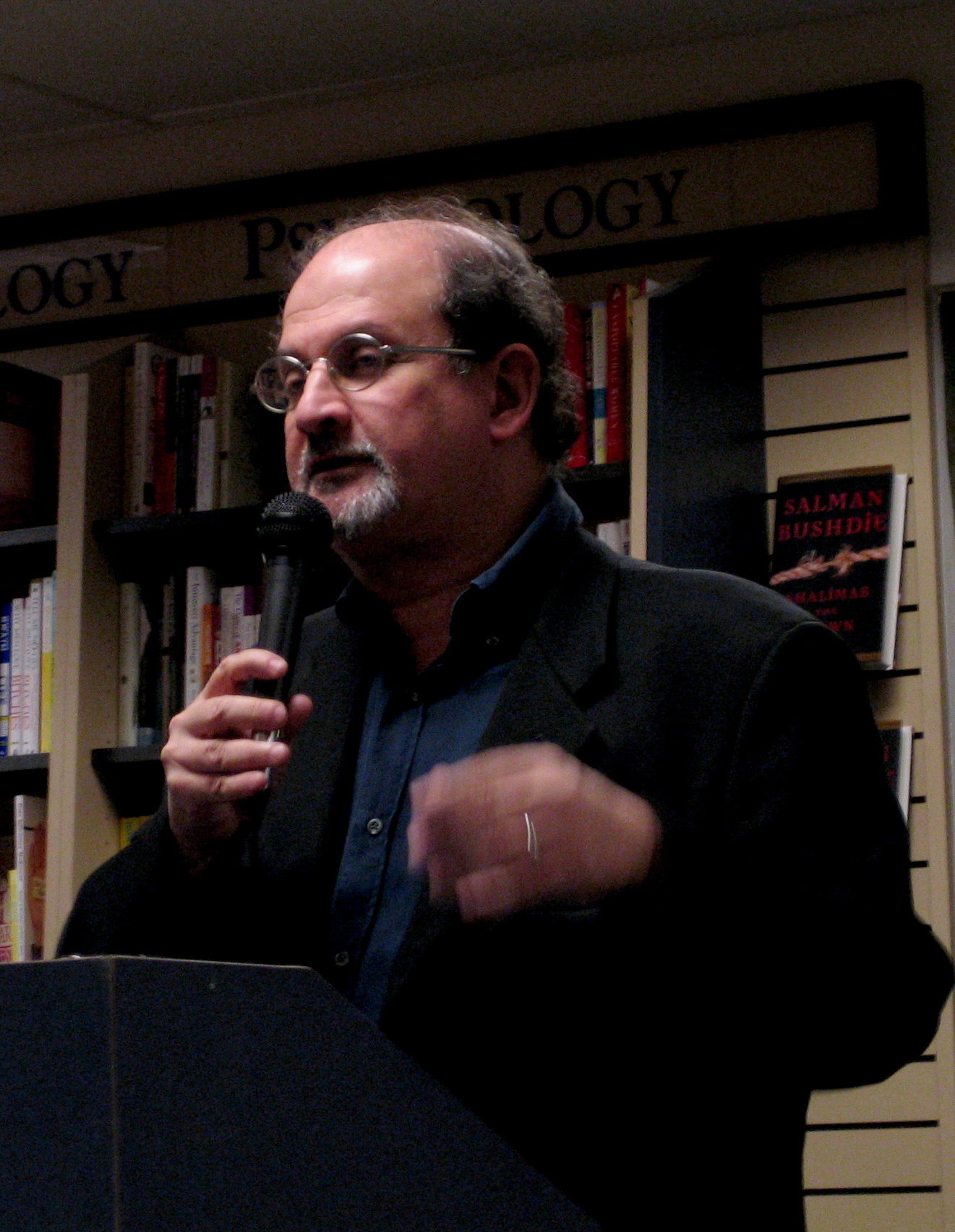
Rushdie presenting his 2005 novel Shalimar the Clown

Rushdie has published many short stories, including those collected in East, West (1994). His 1995 novel The Moor's Last Sigh, a family saga spanning some 100 years of India's history, won the Whitbread Award. The Ground Beneath Her Feet (1999) is a riff on the myth of Orpheus and Eurydice, casting Orpheus and Eurydice as rock stars. The book features many original song lyrics; one was the basis for the U2 song "The Ground Beneath Her Feet". Rushdie is credited as the lyricist. Following Fury (2001), a novel set mainly in New York and avoiding the previous sprawling narrative style that spans generations, periods and places, Rushdie's novel Shalimar the Clown (2005), a story about love and betrayal set in Kashmir and Los Angeles, was hailed as a return to form by a number of critics.

In his 2002 non-fiction collection Step Across This Line, he professes his admiration for Italo Calvino and Pynchon, among others. His early influences included Jorge Luis Borges, Mikhail Bulgakov, Lewis Carroll and Günter Grass. When asked who his favorite novelist is, he says: "There are days when it's Kafka, in whose world we all live; others when it's Dickens, for the sheer fecundity of his imagination and the beauty of his prose. But it's probably Joyce on more days than anyone else." In 2004, Rushdie wrote an essay titled "The East is Blue", arguing that free societies should accept pornography. It is a contribution to the collection XXX: 30 Porn Star Portraits.

2008 saw the publication of The Enchantress of Florence, one of Rushdie's most challenging works that focuses on the past. It tells the story of a European's visit to Akbar's court, and his revelation that he is a lost relative of the Mughal emperor. The novel was praised by Ursula Le Guin in a review in The Guardian as a "sumptuous mixture of history with fable". Luka and the Fire of Life, a sequel to Haroun and the Sea of Stories, was published in November 2010 to critical acclaim. Earlier that year, he announced that he was writing his memoir, Joseph Anton: A Memoir, which was published in September 2012. In 2011, Rushdie embraced Booktrack (a company that synchronises ebooks with customised soundtracks), when he published his short story "In the South" on the platform.

==== Later works, novels, and essays, 2015–2025 ====
2015 saw the publication of Two Years Eight Months and Twenty-Eight Nights, a modern take on the One Thousand and One Nights. Based on the conflict of scholar Ibn Rushd (from whom Rushdie's family name derives), Rushdie explores themes of transnationalism and cosmopolitanism by depicting a war of the universe with a supernatural world of jinns. Ursula K. Le Guin wrote: "Rushdie is our Scheherazade, inexhaustibly enfolding story within story and unfolding tale after tale with such irrepressible delight that it comes as a shock to remember that, like her, he has lived the life of a storyteller in immediate peril. Scheherazade told her 1,001 tales to put off a stupid, cruel threat of death; Rushdie found himself under similar threat for telling an unwelcome tale. So far, like her, he has succeeded in escaping. May he continue to do so."

In 2017, The Golden House, a satirical novel set in contemporary America, was published. 2019 saw the publication of Quichotte, a modern retelling of Don Quixote. In 2021 Languages of Truth, a collection of essays written between 2003 and 2020, was published. After the publication of the collection, Rushdie announced plans to serialise a novella titled The Seventh Wave on Substack.

Rushdie's fifteenth novel Victory City, described as an epic tale of a woman who breathes a fantastical empire into existence, was published in February 2023. The book was Rushdie's first released work after he was attacked and severely injured as he was about to give a public lecture in New York in 2022. In April 2024, his autobiographical book Knife: Meditations After an Attempted Murder, in which Rushdie writes about the attack and his recovery, was published; Knife was a finalist for the 2024 National Book Award for Nonfiction. The Eleventh Hour, a collection of five stories, was released in late 2025.

=== Critical reception ===
Rushdie has had a string of commercially successful and critically acclaimed novels. His works have been shortlisted for the Booker Prize five times, in 1981 for Midnight's Children, 1983 for Shame, 1988 for The Satanic Verses, 1995 for The Moor's Last Sigh, and in 2019 for Quichotte. In 1981, he was awarded the prize. His 2005 novel Shalimar the Clown received the prestigious Hutch Crossword Book Award, and, in the UK, was a finalist for the Whitbread Book Awards. It was shortlisted for the 2007 International Dublin Literary Award. Rushdie's works have spawned 30 book-length studies and more than 700 articles on his writing. He is frequently a favourite to win the Nobel Prize in Literature.

=== Academic and other activities ===
Rushdie has mentored younger Indian (and ethnic-Indian) writers, influenced an entire generation of Indo-Anglian writers, and is an influential writer in postcolonial literature in general. He opposed the British government's introduction of the Racial and Religious Hatred Act in his contribution to Free Expression Is No Offence, a collection of essays by several writers, published by Penguin in 2005.

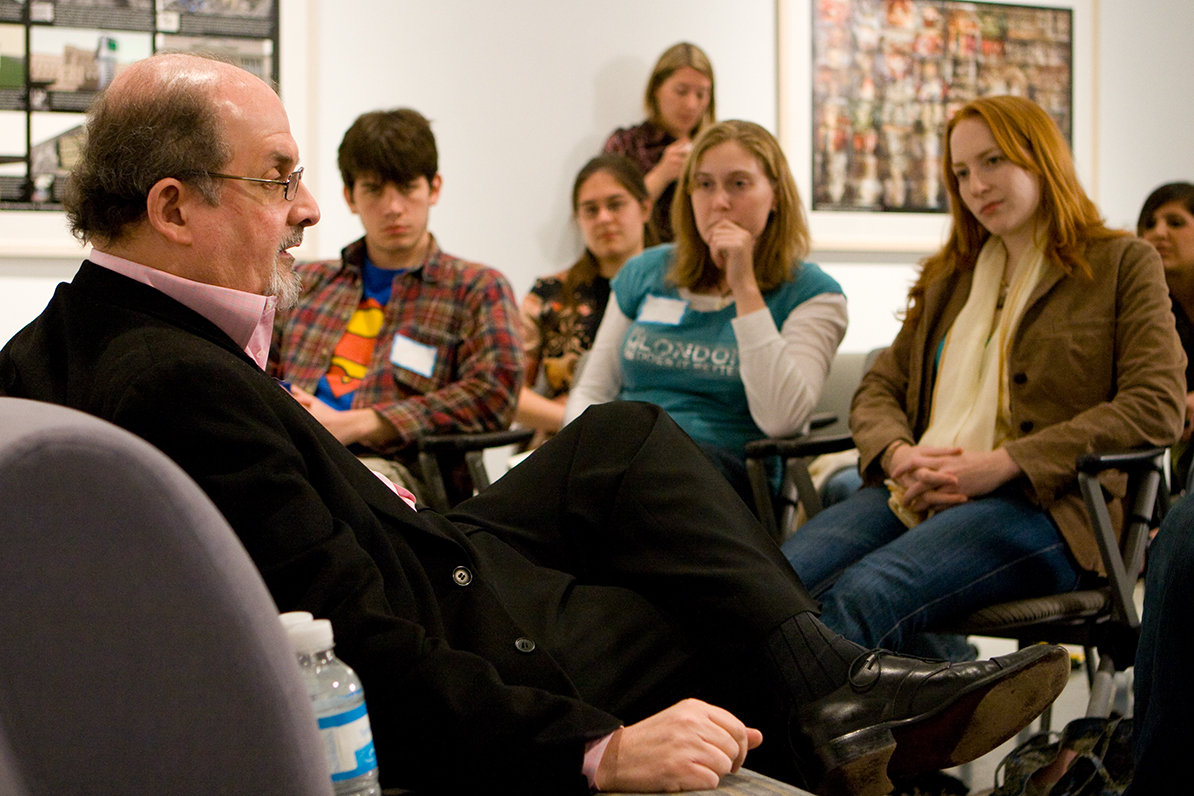
Rushdie having a discussion with Emory University students in February 2008

Rushdie was the President of PEN American Center from 2004 to 2006 and founder of the PEN World Voices Festival. At Emory University he was Distinguished Writer in Residence in the English Department from 2006 to 2011 and University Distinguished Professor until 2015; he has also deposited his archives there. In addition to teaching at Emory University, Rushdie has held an academic appointment as Distinguished Visiting Writer at Bard College in the school's creative writing department, as well as serving as the schools commencement speaker in 1996. In May 2008, Rushdie was elected a Foreign Honorary Member of the American Academy of Arts and Letters. In 2014, he taught a seminar on British Literature and served as the 2015 keynote speaker In September 2015, he joined the New York University Journalism Faculty as a Distinguished Writer in Residence.

Rushdie is a member of the advisory board of The Lunchbox Fund, a non-profit organisation that provides daily meals to students of township schools in Soweto of South Africa. He is a member of the advisory board of the Secular Coalition for America, an advocacy group representing the interests of atheistic and humanistic Americans in Washington, D.C., and a patron of Humanists UK (formerly the British Humanist Association). He is a laureate of the International Academy of Humanism. In November 2010 he became a founding patron of Ralston College, a new liberal arts college that has adopted as its motto a Latin translation of a phrase ("free speech is life itself") from an address he gave at Columbia University in 1991 to mark the 200th anniversary of the First Amendment to the United States Constitution.

=== Film and television ===
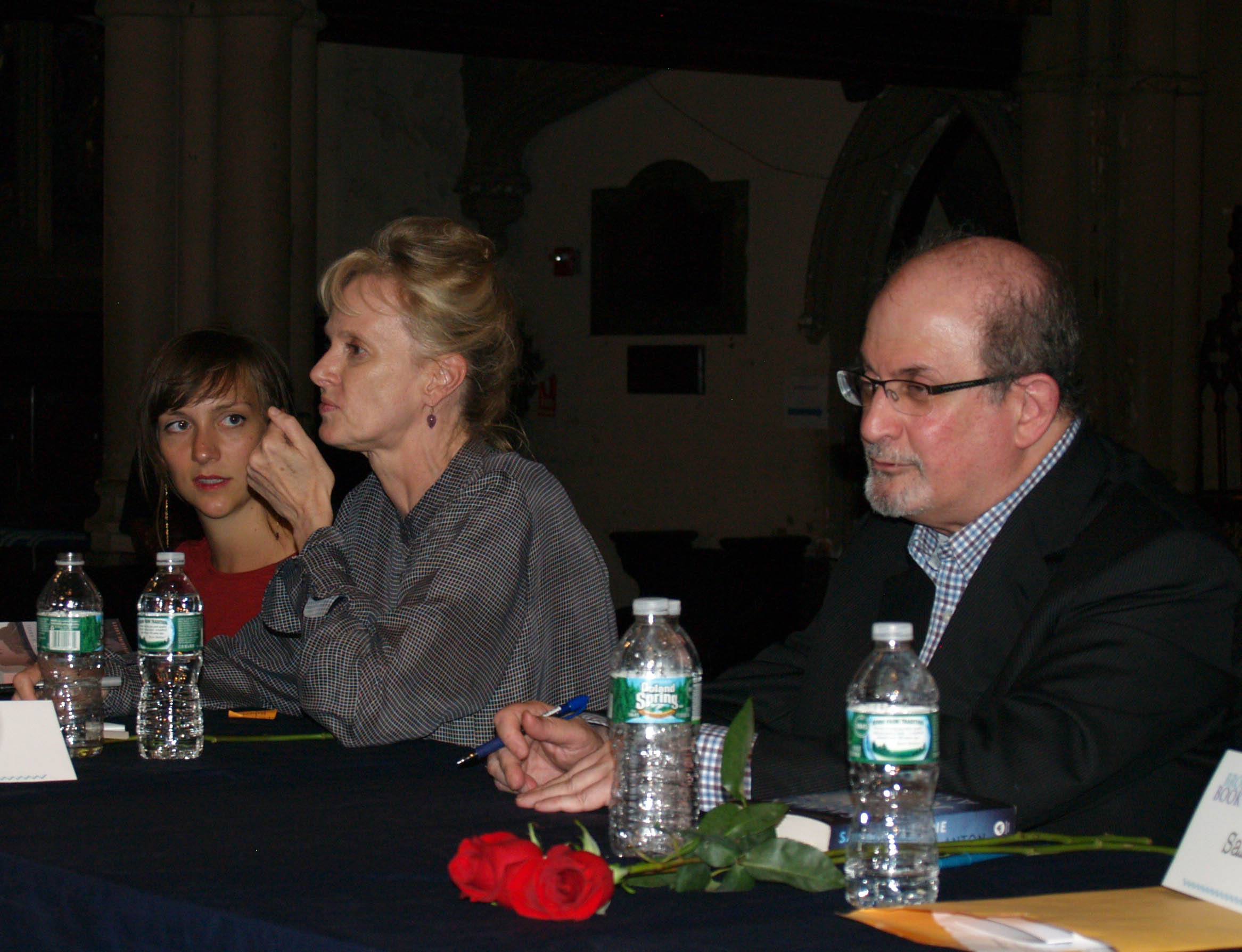
Rushdie, right, with writers Catherine Lacey and Siri Hustvedt at the 2014 Brooklyn Book Festival

Rushdie includes fictional television and movie characters in some of his writings. He had a cameo appearance in the film Bridget Jones's Diary based on the book of the same name, which is itself full of literary in-jokes. On 12 May 2006, Rushdie was a guest host on The Charlie Rose Show, where he interviewed Indo-Canadian filmmaker Deepa Mehta, whose 2005 film Water faced violent protests. He appears in the role of Helen Hunt's obstetrician-gynaecologist in the film adaptation (Hunt's directorial debut) of Elinor Lipman's novel Then She Found Me. In September 2008, and again in March 2009, he appeared as a panellist on the HBO programme Real Time with Bill Maher. Rushdie has said that he was approached for a cameo in Talladega Nights: "They had this idea, just one shot in which three very, very unlikely people were seen as NASCAR drivers. And I think they approached Julian Schnabel, Lou Reed, and me. We were all supposed to be wearing the uniforms and the helmet, walking in slow motion with the heat haze." In the end, their schedules did not allow for it. In 2009, Rushdie signed a petition in support of film director Roman Polanski, calling for his release after Polanski was arrested in Switzerland in relation to his 1977 charge for drugging and raping a 13-year-old girl.

Rushdie collaborated on the screenplay for the cinematic adaptation of his novel Midnight's Children with director Deepa Mehta. The film was also called Midnight's Children. Seema Biswas, Shabana Azmi, Nandita Das, and Irrfan Khan participated in the film. Production began in September 2010; the film was released in 2012.

Rushdie announced in June 2011 that he had written the first draft of a script for a television series for the US cable network Showtime, a project on which he also served as an executive producer. Rushdie described the series, called The Next People, as "a sort of paranoid science-fiction series, people disappearing and being replaced by other people." The idea of a television series was suggested by his US agents, who felt that it would allow him more creative control than feature film. The Next People was made by the British film production company Working Title. In 2017, Rushdie appeared as himself in episode 3 of season 9 of Curb Your Enthusiasm, sharing scenes with Larry David to offer advice on how Larry should deal with the fatwa that has been ordered against him.

== The Satanic Verses and the fatwa ==
The publication of The Satanic Verses by Viking Penguin Publishing in September 1988 caused immediate controversy in the Islamic world because of what was seen by some to be an irreverent depiction of prophet Muhammad. The title refers to a disputed Muslim tradition that is referenced in the book. According to this tradition, prophet Muhammad (Mahound in the book) added verses (Ayah) to the Quran accepting three Arabian pagan goddesses who were worshiped in Mecca as divine beings. According to the legend, Muhammad later revoked the verses, saying the devil tempted him to utter these lines to appease the Meccans (hence the "Satanic" verses). However, the narrator reveals to the reader that these disputed verses were actually from the mouth of the Archangel Gabriel. The book was banned in many countries with large Muslim communities, including India, Iran, Bangladesh, Sudan, South Africa, Sri Lanka, Kenya, Thailand, Tanzania, Indonesia, Singapore, Venezuela, and Pakistan. In total, 20 countries banned the book.

In response to the protests, on 22 January 1989, Rushdie published a column in The Observer that called Muhammad "one of the great geniuses of world history," but noted that Islamic doctrine holds Muhammad to be human, and in no way perfect. He held that the novel is not "an anti-religious novel. It is, however, an attempt to write about migration, its stresses and transformations."

On 14 February 1989—Valentine's Day, and also the day of his close friend Bruce Chatwin's funeral—a fatwa ordering Rushdie's execution was proclaimed on Radio Tehran by Ayatollah Khomeini, the Supreme leader of Iran at the time, calling the book "blasphemous against Islam". Chapter IV of the book depicts the character of an Imam in exile who returns to incite revolt from the people of his country with no regard for their safety. According to Khomeini's son, his father never read the book. A bounty was offered for Rushdie's death, and he was thus forced to live under police protection for several years. On 7 March 1989, the United Kingdom and Iran broke diplomatic relations over the Rushdie controversy.

In 1989, The New York Times published "Words For Salman Rushdie": "28 distinguished writers born in 21 countries speak to him from their common land – the country of literature. For expressing their ideas publicly in the past many of these writers have suffered censorship, exile – forced or self-imposed – and imprisonment." Czesław Miłosz wrote: "I have particular reasons to defend your rights, Mr. Rushdie. My books have been forbidden in many countries or have had whole passages censored out. I'm grateful to people who stood then by the principle of free expression, and I back you now in my turn." Ralph Ellison: "You deserve the full and passionate solidarity of any man of dignity, but I am afraid this is too little. This story of a man alone against worldwide intolerance, and of a book alone against the craziness of the media, can become the story of many others. The bell tolls for all of us." Umberto Eco: "Keep to your convictions. Try to protect yourself. A death sentence is a rather harsh review." Anita Desai: "Silence, exile and cunning, yes. And courage."

Christopher Hitchens described the fatwa as "A matter of everything [he] hated versus everything [he] loved," and a challenge to "the values of the Enlightenment." Rushdie wrote: "I have often been asked if Christopher defended me because he was my close friend. The truth is that he became my close friend because he wanted to defend me ... He and I found ourselves describing our ideas, without conferring, in almost identical terms. I began to understand that while I had not chosen the battle it was at least the right battle, because in it everything that I loved and valued (literature, freedom, irreverence, freedom, irreligion, freedom) was ranged against everything I detested (fanaticism, violence, bigotry, humorlessness, philistinism, and the new offense culture of the age). Then I read Christopher using exactly the same everything-he-loved-versus-everything-he-hated trope, and felt … understood."

In 1993, 100 writers and intellectuals from the Muslim world, including Adonis, Mohammed Arkoun, Mahmoud Darwish, Amin Maalouf and Edward Said expressed solidarity in the collection For Rushdie. Naguib Mahfouz wrote: "The veritable terrorism of which he is a target is unjustifiable, indefensible. One idea can only be opposed by other ideas. Even if the punishment is carried out, the idea as well as the book will remain." Tahar Ben Jelloun wrote that the fatwa was "intolerable, inadmissible and has nothing to do with the tolerant Islam that I was taught" and threatened "the ability to create characters and develop them in the space and time chosen by the writer." Rabah Belamri wrote "A society that refuses to question itself, that denies artists and thinkers the right to raise doubts, that dares not laugh at itself, has no hope of prospering." The composer Ahmed Essyad wrote a piece of music dedicated "To Salman Rushdie, so that, as an artist, he can write what I disagree with." Rushdie expressed gratitude for an "anthology of blows struck in the fight against obscurantism and fanaticism" by "the most gifted, the most learned, the most important voices of the Muslim and Arab world, gathered together to subject my work and the furor surrounding it to so brilliant, so many-sided, so judicious an examination."

When, on BBC Radio 4, he was asked for a response to the threat, Rushdie said, "Frankly, I wish I had written a more critical book," and "I'm very sad that it should have happened. It's not true that this book is a blasphemy against Islam. I doubt very much that Khomeini or anyone else in Iran has read the book or more than selected extracts out of context." Later, he wrote that he was "proud, then and always", of that statement; while he did not feel his book was especially critical of Islam, "a religion whose leaders behaved in this way could probably use a little criticism."

The publication of the book and the fatwa sparked violence around the world, with bookstores firebombed. Muslim communities in several Western nations held public rallies, burning copies of the book. Several people associated with translating or publishing the book were attacked, seriously injured, or killed. Many more people died in riots in some countries. Despite the danger posed by the fatwa, Rushdie made a public appearance at London's Wembley Stadium on 11 August 1993, during a concert by U2. In 2010, U2 bassist Adam Clayton recalled that "lead vocalist Bono had been calling Salman Rushdie from the stage every night on the Zoo TV tour. When we played Wembley, Salman showed up in person and the stadium erupted. You [could] tell from [drummer] Larry Mullen, Jr.'s face that we weren't expecting it. Salman was a regular visitor after that. He had a backstage pass and he used it as often as possible. For a man who was supposed to be in hiding, it was remarkably easy to see him around the place."

On 24 September 1998, as a precondition to the restoration of diplomatic relations with the UK, the Iranian government, then headed by Mohammad Khatami, gave a public commitment that it would "neither support nor hinder assassination operations on Rushdie." Hardline newspapers in Iran continued to support the death sentence until at least 2022. In early 2005, Khomeini's fatwa was reaffirmed by Iran's then-current leader, Ayatollah Ali Khamenei, in a message to Muslim pilgrims making the annual pilgrimage to Mecca. Additionally, the Revolutionary Guards declared that the death sentence on him is still valid.

Rushdie has reported that he still receives a "sort of Valentine's card" from Iran each year on 14 February letting him know the country has not forgotten the vow to kill him and has jokingly referred to it as "my unfunny Valentine". He said: "It's reached the point where it's a piece of rhetoric rather than a real threat." Despite the threats on Rushdie personally, he said that his family has never been threatened, and that his mother, who lived in Pakistan during the later years of her life, even received outpourings of support. Rushdie himself has been prevented from entering Pakistan, however.

A former bodyguard to Rushdie, Ron Evans, planned to publish a book recounting the behaviour of the author during the time he was in hiding. Evans said Rushdie tried to profit financially from the fatwa and was suicidal, but Rushdie dismissed the book as a "bunch of lies" and took legal action against Evans, his co-author and their publisher. On 26 August 2008, Rushdie received an apology at the High Court in London from all three parties. A memoir of his years of hiding, Joseph Anton, was released on 18 September 2012; "Joseph Anton" was Rushdie's secret alias during the height of the controversy.

In February 1997, Ayatollah Hasan Sane'i, leader of the bonyad panzdah-e khordad (Fifteenth of Khordad Foundation), reported that the blood money offered by the foundation for the assassination of Rushdie would be increased from $2 million to $2.5 million.

In November 2015, former Indian minister P. Chidambaram stated that banning The Satanic Verses was wrong. In 1998, Iran's former president Mohammad Khatami proclaimed the fatwa "finished"; but it has never been officially lifted, and in fact has been reiterated several times by Ali Khamenei and other religious officials. More money was added to the bounty in February 2016.

=== Failed assassination attempt (1989) ===
On 3 August 1989, while a man using the alias Mustafa Mahmoud Mazeh was priming a book bomb loaded with RDX explosives in a hotel in Paddington, Central London, the bomb exploded prematurely, destroying two floors of the hotel and killing Mazeh. A previously unknown Lebanese group, the Organization of the Mujahidin of Islam, said he died preparing an attack "on the apostate Rushdie". There is a shrine in Tehran's Behesht-e Zahra cemetery for Mustafa Mahmoud Mazeh that says he was "Martyred in London, 3 August 1989. The first martyr to die on a mission to kill Salman Rushdie." Mazeh's mother was invited to relocate to Iran, and the Islamic World Movement of Martyrs' Commemoration built his shrine in the cemetery that holds thousands of Iranian soldiers slain in the Iran–Iraq War.

=== Translators attacked ===
In 1991, the book's Italian translator was non-fatally stabbed. Days later, the Japanese translator Hitoshi Igarashi was stabbed to death. Two years later, its Norwegian publisher, William Nygaard, survived being shot three times.

=== Hezbollah's comments (2006) ===
During the 2006 Jyllands-Posten Muhammad cartoons controversy, Hezbollah leader Hassan Nasrallah declared that "If there had been a Muslim to carry out Imam Khomeini's fatwa against the renegade Salman Rushdie, this rabble who insult our Prophet Mohammed in Denmark, Norway and France would not have dared to do so. I am sure there are millions of Muslims who are ready to give their lives to defend our prophet's honour and we have to be ready to do anything for that."

=== International Guerillas (1990) ===
In 1990, soon after the publication of The Satanic Verses, a Pakistani film entitled International Gorillay (International Guerillas) was released that depicted Rushdie as a "James Bond-style villain" plotting to cause the downfall of Pakistan by opening a chain of casinos and discos in the country; he is ultimately killed at the end of the movie. The film was popular with Pakistani audiences, and it "presents Rushdie as a Rambo-like figure pursued by four Pakistani guerrillas". The British Board of Film Classification refused to allow it a certificate; "it was felt that the portrayal of Rushdie might qualify as criminal libel, causing a breach of the peace as opposed to merely tarnishing his reputation." This effectively prevented the release of the film in the UK. Two months later, however, Rushdie himself wrote to the board, saying that while he thought the film "a distorted, incompetent piece of trash", he would not sue if it were released. He later said, "If that film had been banned, it would have become the hottest video in town: everyone would have seen it". While the film was a great hit in Pakistan, it went virtually unnoticed elsewhere.

=== Al-Qaeda hit list (2010) ===
In 2010, Anwar al-Awlaki published an Al-Qaeda hit list in Inspire magazine, including Rushdie along with other figures claimed to have insulted Islam, including Ayaan Hirsi Ali, cartoonist Lars Vilks, and three Jyllands-Posten staff members: Kurt Westergaard, Carsten Juste, and Flemming Rose. The list was later expanded to include Stéphane "Charb" Charbonnier, who was murdered in a terror attack on Charlie Hebdo in Paris, along with 11 other people. After the attack, Al-Qaeda called for more killings.

Rushdie expressed his support for Charlie Hebdo, saying "I stand with Charlie Hebdo, as we all must, to defend the art of satire, which has always been a force for liberty and against tyranny, dishonesty and stupidity ... religious totalitarianism has caused a deadly mutation in the heart of Islam and we see the tragic consequences in Paris today." In response to the attack, Rushdie commented on what he perceived as victim-blaming in the media, stating: "You can dislike Charlie Hebdo.... But the fact that you dislike them has nothing to do with their right to speak. The fact you dislike them certainly doesn't in any way excuse their murder."

=== Jaipur Literature Festival (2012) ===
Rushdie was due to appear at the Jaipur Literature Festival in January 2012 in Jaipur, Rajasthan, India. However, he later cancelled his event appearance, and a further tour of India at the time, citing a possible threat to his life as the primary reason. Several days after, he indicated that state police agencies had lied to keep him away from the festival.

Meanwhile, Indian authors Ruchir Joshi, Jeet Thayil, Hari Kunzru and Amitava Kumar abruptly left Jaipur after reading excerpts from Rushdie's banned novel at the festival. The four were urged to leave by organizers, police, and lawyers.

A proposed video link session between Rushdie and the Jaipur Literature Festival was also cancelled at the last minute after protesters threatened violence. Rushdie returned to India to address a conference in New Delhi on 16 March 2012.

=== 2022 murder attempt ===
On 12 August 2022, while about to start a lecture at the Chautauqua Institution in Chautauqua, New York, Rushdie was attacked by a man who rushed onto the stage and stabbed him repeatedly, including in the face, neck and abdomen. The attacker was pulled away before being taken into custody by a state trooper; Rushdie was airlifted to UPMC Hamot, a tertiary trauma center in Erie, Pennsylvania, where he underwent surgery before being put on a ventilator.

Security measures at UPMC Hamot were increased due to the potential threat of further attempts on his life. This included 24-hour protection with a security officer outside his room and searches being performed upon entry into the hospital. The suspect was identified as 24-year-old Hadi Matar of Fairview, New Jersey. Later in the day, Rushdie's agent, Andrew Wylie, confirmed that Rushdie had sustained stab injuries to the liver and hand, and that he might lose an eye. A day later, Rushdie was taken off the ventilator and was able to speak.

On 23 October 2022, Wylie reported that Rushdie had survived the murder attempt, but had lost sight in one eye and the use of one hand. Rushdie's memoir about the attack, Knife: Meditations After an Attempted Murder, was published in April 2024. It hit number one in the Sunday Times Bestsellers List in the General hardbacks category. In the memoir, Rushdie engages in fictional conversations with the assailant, who is referred to as "A".

The jury selection for the trial was originally scheduled to begin on 8 January 2024. However, Matar's lawyer successfully petitioned to delay the trial, arguing that his lawyers were entitled to see the memoir and any related materials before Matar stood trial, as the documents constituted evidence.

Rushdie recalled experiencing a vivid dream of being stabbed in an ancient Roman amphitheatre two days before the actual stabbing occurred. The intensity of the dream caused him to consider canceling the event until he eventually decided on attending.

In February 2025, the attacker, Hadi Matar, was found guilty of attempted murder and assault in connection with the stabbing. In May 2025, Matar was sentenced to 25 years in prison for the attack. On 30 July 2026 the court found him guilty of federal terrorism charges, linked to the fatwa issued by Khomeini. Two of the men who went to Rushdie's aid were awarded the Carnegie Medal for heroism in 2025.

Rushdie appeares in two documentaries about the attack. Salman Rushdie: Through a Glass Darkly was released in 2024. Knife: The Attempted Murder of Salman Rushdie was directed by Alex Gibney, and released in 2026.

== Awards, honours, and recognition ==
In 2008, The Times ranked Rushdie 13th on its list of the 50 greatest British writers since 1945. In April 2023, Rushdie was named one of the 100 most influential people in the world by Time magazine.

Awards and honours include:

- Austrian State Prize for European Literature (1993)
- Commandeur de l'Ordre des Arts et des Lettres of France (1999).
- Distinguished Writer in Residence at the Arthur L. Carter Journalism Institute of New York University in 2015.
- Fellow of the Royal Society of Literature (1983)
- Golden PEN Award
- Honorary doctorate from the University of Liège, Belgium
- Hans Christian Andersen Literature Award (2014)
- Honorary degree of Doctor of Humane Letters (L.H.D.) from Indiana University (2018)
- Honorary degree of Doctor of Letters (Litt.D.) from Emory University (2015)
- James Joyce Award from University College Dublin (2008)
- Outstanding Lifetime Achievement in Cultural Humanism from Harvard University (2007)
- PEN Pinter Prize (UK)
- St. Louis Literary Award from the Saint Louis University Library Associates
- Swiss Freethinkers Award 2019
- 2019 Humanist of the Year Award
- Peace Prize of the German Publishers and Booksellers Association 2023
- Champion of Writers Award from Authors Guild Foundation in 2025
- 2025 Ambassador Richard C. Holbrooke Distinguished Achievement Award, one of the Dayton Literary Peace Prizes.
- 2026 National Book Award medal for Lifetime Achievement

=== Knighthood ===
Rushdie was knighted for services to literature in the Queen's Birthday Honours on 16 June 2007. He remarked: "I am thrilled and humbled to receive this great honour, and am very grateful that my work has been recognised in this way." In response to his knighthood, many nations with Muslim majorities protested. Parliamentarians of several of these countries condemned the action, and Iran and Pakistan called in their British envoys to protest formally. Controversial condemnation issued by Pakistan's Religious Affairs Minister Muhammad Ijaz-ul-Haq was in turn rebuffed by former Prime Minister Benazir Bhutto. Several called publicly for his death. Some non-Muslims expressed disappointment at Rushdie's knighthood, claiming that the writer did not merit such an honour and there were several other writers who deserved the knighthood more than Rushdie.

Al-Qaeda condemned the Rushdie honour. The group's then-leader, Ayman al-Zawahiri, was quoted as saying in an audio recording that the UK's award for Rushdie was "an insult to Islam", and it was planning "a very precise response".

When asked if the knighthood was an insult to Muslims, Christopher Hitchens answered: "Midnight's Children did not just win the Booker, and Salman did not just later win the Booker of Bookers, Midnight's Children won the main literary award in Iran, people tend to forget. When the fatwa was issued against him by a senile theocratic dictator who had run his own country into beggary and bankruptcy and misery, every Arab and Muslim writer worthy of the name, all signed, and wrote in a book for Salman, we identify our cause with you, and your struggle with free expression in our culture. If you say that Muslims are being offended by this, and you lump them all together, you immediately grant that they are in fact represented by the most extreme, homicidal, fanatical, illiterate, intolerant people who not only haven't read this book, but couldn't read it. And that's an insult to Islam!" Rushdie was appointed a Member of the Order of the Companions of Honour (CH) in the 2022 Birthday Honours for services to literature.

== Religious and political beliefs ==
=== Religious background ===
Rushdie came from a liberal Muslim family, but he is an atheist. In a 2006 interview with PBS, Rushdie called himself a "hardline atheist".

In 1989, in an interview following the fatwa, Rushdie said that he was in a sense a lapsed Muslim, though "shaped by Muslim culture more than any other," and a student of Islam. In another interview the same year, he said: "My point of view is that of a secular human being. I do not believe in supernatural entities, whether Christian, Jewish, Muslim or Hindu."

In 15 December 1990, Rushdie issued a statement reaffirming his Muslim faith, distancing himself from statements made by characters in Satanic Verses that cast aspersions on Islam or Prophet Mohammad, and opposing the release of the paperback edition of the novel. Later, in 1992, he cited the release of the statement as perhaps his lowest point, regretting its language, which he said he had not written.

Rushdie advocates the application of higher criticism, pioneered during the late 19th century. In a guest opinion piece printed in The Washington Post and The Times in mid-August 2005, Rushdie called for a reform in Islam.

What is needed is a move beyond tradition, nothing less than a reform movement to bring the core concepts of Islam into the modern age, a Muslim Reformation to combat not only the jihadist ideologues but also the dusty, stifling seminaries of the traditionalists, throwing open the windows to let in much-needed fresh air. ... It is high time, for starters, that Muslims were able to study the revelation of their religion as an event inside history, not supernaturally above it. ... Broad-mindedness is related to tolerance; open-mindedness is the sibling of peace.

— Salman Rushdie, "Muslims unite! A new Reformation will bring your faith into the modern era"

Rushdie is a critic of moral and cultural relativism. In an interview with Point of Inquiry in 2006, he described his view as follows:

We need all of us, whatever our background, to constantly examine the stories inside which and with which we live. We all live in stories, so called grand narratives. Nation is a story. Family is a story. Religion is a story. Community is a story. We all live within and with these narratives. And it seems to me that a definition of any living vibrant society is that you constantly question those stories. That you constantly argue about the stories. In fact the arguing never stops. The argument itself is freedom. It's not that you come to a conclusion about it. And through that argument you change your mind sometimes.… And that's how societies grow. When you can't retell for yourself the stories of your life then you live in a prison.… Somebody else controls the story.… Now it seems to me that we have to say that a problem in contemporary Islam is the inability to re-examine the ground narrative of the religion.… The fact that in Islam it is very difficult to do this, makes it difficult to think new thoughts.

Rushdie is an advocate of religious satire. He condemned the Charlie Hebdo shooting and defended comedic criticism of religions in a comment originally posted on English PEN where he called religions a medieval form of unreason. Rushdie called the attack a consequence of "religious totalitarianism", which according to him had caused "a deadly mutation in the heart of Islam". He said:

Religion, a medieval form of unreason, when combined with modern weaponry becomes a real threat to our freedoms. This religious totalitarianism has caused a deadly mutation in the heart of Islam and we see the tragic consequences in Paris today. I stand with Charlie Hebdo, as we all must, to defend the art of satire, which has always been a force for liberty and against tyranny, dishonesty and stupidity. 'Respect for religion' has become a code phrase meaning 'fear of religion.' Religions, like all other ideas, deserve criticism, satire, and, yes, our fearless disrespect.

In 2015, Rushdie defended PEN America's decision to give Charlie Hebdo a freedom of expression award.

When asked about reading and writing as a human right, Rushdie states: "...there are the larger stories, the grand narratives that we live in, which are things like nation, and family, and clan, and so on. Those stories are considered to be treated reverentially. They need to be part of the way in which we conduct the discourse of our lives and to prevent people from doing something very damaging to human nature." Though Rushdie believes the freedoms of literature to be universal, the bulk of his fictions portrays the struggles of the marginally underrepresented. This can be seen in his portrayal of the role of women in his 1983 novel Shame. In this novel, Rushdie, "suggests that it is women who suffer most from the injustices of the Pakistani social order." His support of feminism can also be seen in a 2015 interview with New York magazine's The Cut.

=== Political background ===
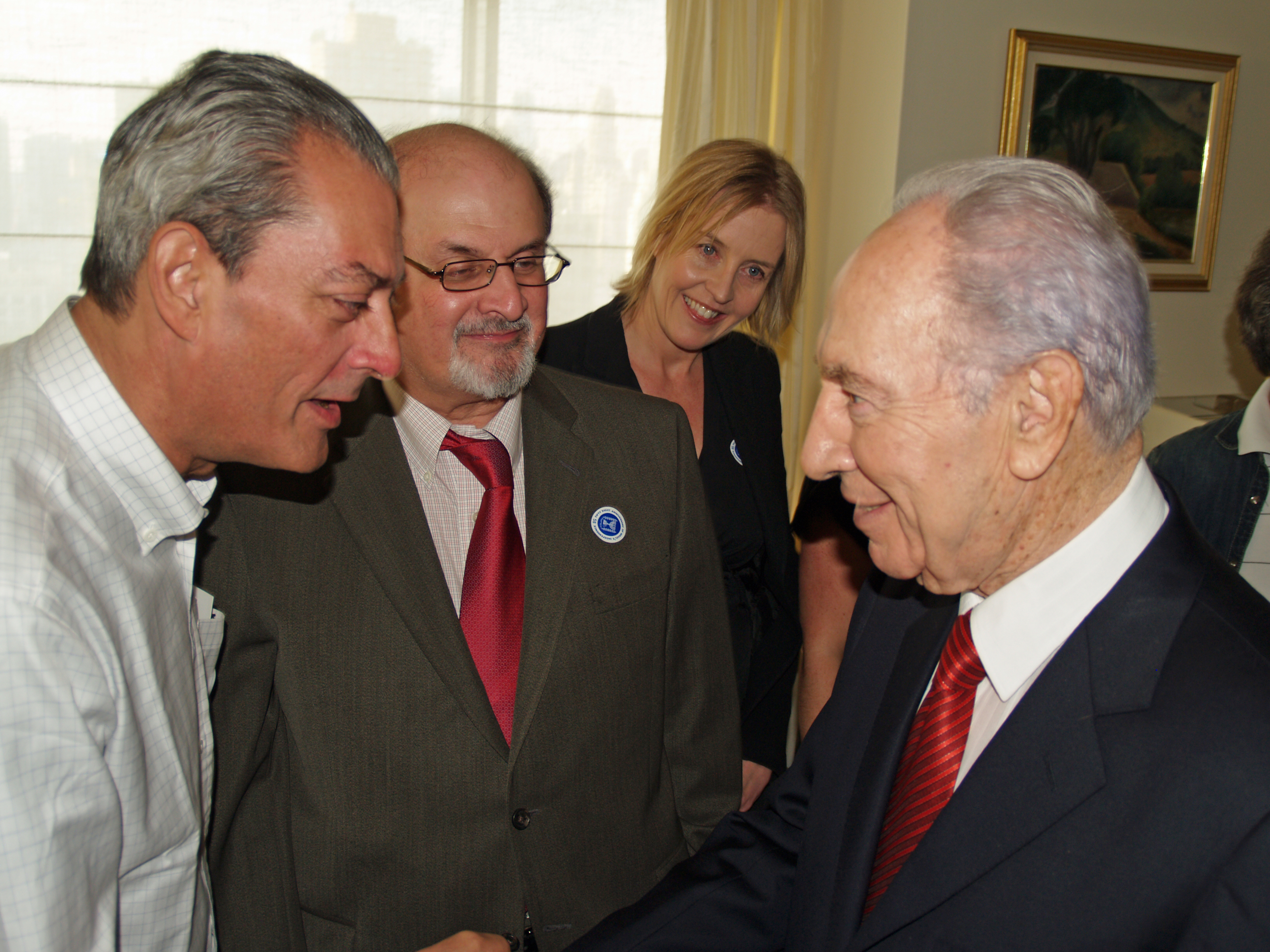
Paul Auster and Rushdie greeting Israeli President Shimon Peres with Caro Llewellyn in 2008

==== UK politics ====
In 2006, Rushdie stated that he supported comments by Jack Straw, then-Leader of the House of Commons from Labour, who criticized the wearing of the niqab (a veil that covers all of the face except the eyes). Rushdie stated that his three sisters would never wear the veil. He said: "I think the battle against the veil has been a long and continuing battle against the limitation of women, so in that sense I'm completely on Straw's side."

==== US politics ====
Rushdie supported the 1999 NATO bombing of the Federal Republic of Yugoslavia, leading historian Tariq Ali to label Rushdie part of what he considered to be "warrior writers" as "the belligerati". He was supportive of the US-led campaign to remove the Taliban in Afghanistan, which began in 2001 but was a vocal critic of the 2003 war in Iraq. He stated that while there was a "case to be made for the removal of Saddam Hussein", US unilateral military intervention was unjustifiable. Terry Eagleton, a former admirer of Rushdie's work and Marxist literary critic, criticized him, saying he "cheered on the Pentagon's criminal ventures in Iraq and Afghanistan." Eagleton subsequently apologized for having misrepresented Rushdie's views.

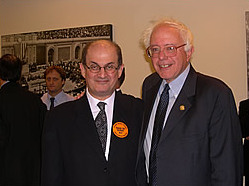
Rushdie and Bernie Sanders in 2004

Rushdie supported the election of Barack Obama for the US presidency and has often criticized the Republican Party. He was involved in the Occupy Movement, both as a presence at Occupy Boston and as a founding member of Occupy Writers. Rushdie is a supporter of gun control, blaming a shooting at a Colorado cinema in July 2012 on the American right to keep and bear arms. He acquired American citizenship in 2016 and voted for Hillary Clinton in that year's election.

Noting the rise of "populist authoritarian demagoguery" around the world, Rushdie said there was "a willingness amongst at least some part of the [US] population to cease to value the democratic values enshrined in the first amendment. So I think the problem is, I would now say, political more than primarily religious".

==== Against religious extremism ====
In the wake of the Jyllands-Posten Muhammad cartoons controversy in March 2006 Rushdie signed the manifesto Together Facing the New Totalitarianism, a statement warning of the dangers of religious extremism. The Manifesto was published in the left-leaning French weekly Charlie Hebdo in March 2006. When Amnesty International suspended human rights activist Gita Sahgal for saying to the press that she thought the organization should distance itself from Moazzam Begg and his organization, Rushdie said:

Amnesty…has done its reputation incalculable damage by allying itself with Moazzam Begg and his group Cageprisoners, and holding them up as human rights advocates. It looks very much as if Amnesty's leadership is suffering from a kind of moral bankruptcy, and has lost the ability to distinguish right from wrong. It has greatly compounded its error by suspending the redoubtable Gita Sahgal for the crime of going public with her concerns. Gita Sahgal is a woman of immense integrity and distinction. ... It is people like Gita Sahgal who are the true voices of the human rights movement; Amnesty and Begg have revealed, by their statements and actions, that they deserve our contempt.

In July 2020, Rushdie was one of the 153 signers of the "Harper's Letter", also known as "A Letter on Justice and Open Debate", that expressed concern that "the free exchange of information and ideas, the lifeblood of a liberal society, is daily becoming more constricted." In October 2023, Rushdie expressed his "horror" at both Hamas' attack on Israel and Israel's retaliation in the Gaza Strip and called for a "cessation in hostilities".

In May 2024, Rushdie argued that if a Palestinian state ever came into being, it would resemble a "Taliban-like state" and become a client state of Iran. He further stated, "There's an emotional reaction to the death in Gaza, and that's absolutely right. But when it slides over towards antisemitism and sometimes to actual support of Hamas, then it's very problematic." He voiced his puzzlement regarding the current support of progressive students for what he described as a "fascist terrorist group".

==== South Asian politics and Kashmir ====
Rushdie has been critical of Pakistan's former Prime Minister Imran Khan after Khan took personal jabs at him in a 2012 interview. Khan had called Rushdie "unbalanced", saying he has the "mindset of a small man", claiming they had "never met" and he would never "want to meet him ever", despite the two being spotted together in public numerous times.

Rushdie has expressed his preference for India over Pakistan, stating in 2009 that Pakistan "felt unfree if you were used to living in a free society".

In Indian politics, Rushdie has criticized the Bharatiya Janata Party and its chairperson, the incumbent Prime Minister Narendra Modi. In a 2006 interview about his novel Shalimar the Clown, Rushdie laments the division of Kashmir into zones of Indian and Pakistani administration as having cut his family down the middle. In August 2019, he criticized the revocation of the special status of Jammu and Kashmir, tweeting: "Even from seven thousand miles away it's clear that what's happening in Kashmir is an atrocity. Not much to celebrate this August 15th." He has previously referred to crackdowns in Indian-administered Kashmir as pretexts for the rise of jihadism in the region:

The phrase of "crackdown" that the Indian army uses really is a euphemism of mass destruction. And rape. And brutalisation. That happens all the time. It's still happening now. ... The decision to treat all Kashmiris as if they're potential terrorists is what has unleashed this, the kind of "holocaust" against the Kashmiri people. And we know ourselves, from most recent events in Europe, how important it is to resist treating all Muslims as if they're terrorists, but the Indian army has taken the decision to do the opposite of that, to actually decide that everybody is a potential combatant to treat them in that way. And the level of brutality is quite spectacular. And, frankly, without that the jihadists would have had very little response from the Kashmiri people who were not really traditionally interested in radical Islam. So now they're caught between the devil and the deep blue sea, and that's the tragedy of the place. ... And really what I was trying to do was say exactly that the attraction of the jihad in Kashmir arose out of the activities of the Indian army.

== Personal life ==
In 1976, Rushdie married Clarissa Luard, literature officer of the Arts Council of England, with whom he has a son. Rushdie left Clarissa in 1987 for Australian writer Robyn Davidson, to whom he was introduced by their mutual friend Bruce Chatwin, a fellow writer. Rushdie and Davidson never married, and had separated by the time his divorce from Clarissa came through in 1987. Rushdie and American writer Marianne Wiggins married the next year.

In 1991, Rushdie bought a safe house at 9 The Bishops Avenue in the London Borough of Barnet, where he lived with his family from the next year until his immigration to the United States in 2000. Rushdie and Wiggins divorced in 1993. In 1997, Rushdie married British editor and writer Elizabeth West, with whom he has a son. The couple separated in 2007.

In 1999, Rushdie underwent an operation to correct ptosis. According to Rushdie, ptosis had made it increasingly difficult for him to open his eyes. He stated: "If I hadn't had an operation, in a couple of years from now I wouldn't have been able to open my eyes at all."

Since his immigration, Rushdie has lived mostly near Union Square, Manhattan, New York City. Rushdie married Indian-American television presenter and model Padma Lakshmi in 2004 after divorcing Elizabeth West the same year. At the time of their first meeting in 1999, Rushdie was 51 years old, while Lakshmi was 28 years old. Lakshmi asked for a divorce in January 2007, according to Rushdie, and the couple filed for it in July. She has criticized him as insecure and spoiled, stating that he constantly craved praise and demanded "frequent sex". Lakshmi has claimed that Rushdie had referred to her as a "bad investment" and was insensitive to her painful endometriosis. Rushdie and American poet Rachel Eliza Griffiths married in 2021.

Rushdie is a fan of the English football club Tottenham Hotspur. He has been a holder of the Person of Indian Origin Card, which grants certain rights to people of the Indian diaspora short of full citizenship.

Rushdie's niece is the pianist Mishka Rushdie Momen.

== Works ==
=== Novels ===
- Grimus (1975)
- Midnight's Children (1981)
- Shame (1983)
- The Satanic Verses (1988)
- The Moor's Last Sigh (1995)
- The Ground Beneath Her Feet (1999)
- Fury (2001)
- Shalimar the Clown (2005)
- The Enchantress of Florence (2008)
- Two Years Eight Months and Twenty-Eight Nights (2015)
- The Golden House (2017)
- Quichotte (2019)
- Victory City (2023)

=== Short story collections ===
- East, West (1995)
- The Eleventh Hour: A Quintet of Stories (2025)

=== Children's books ===
- Haroun and the Sea of Stories (1990)
- Luka and the Fire of Life (2010)

=== Essays and criticism ===
- Imaginary Homelands: Essays and Criticism, 1981–1991 (1991)
- Step Across This Line: Collected Nonfiction, 1992–2002 (2002)
- Languages of Truth: Essays, 2003–2020 (2021)
- In Good Faith (1990) — an essay on The Satanic Verses published as a pamphlet by Granta Books
- The Wizard of Oz, BFI Film Classics (1992) — a study of the film published by the British Film Institute

=== Memoirs ===
- The Jaguar Smile: A Nicaraguan Journey (1987)
- Joseph Anton: A Memoir (2012)
- Knife: Meditations After an Attempted Murder (2024)

=== As editor ===
- Mirrorwork: 50 Years of Indian Writing 1947–1997 (1997) — edited with Elizabeth West
- The Best American Short Stories (2008) — guest editor

== See also ==
- Blasphemy
- The Butterfly Hunter
- Criticism of Islam
- Censorship in South Asia
- Hysterical realism
- Indians in the New York City metropolitan area
- List of fatwas
- List of Indian writers
- PEN International
- Postmodern literature

== Relevant literature ==
- Szpila, Grzegorz. "Paremic verses: Proverbial meanings in Salman Rushdie's novels." Journal of Literary Semantics 37.2(2008): 97–127.
- Szpila, Grzegorz. "Paremic Allusions in Salman Rushdie's Novels." Proverbium, 25 (2008), 379–398.
- Szpila, Grzegorz. Idioms in Salman Rushdie's Novels. A PhraseoStylistic Approach. Frankfurt am Main: Peter Lang, 2012. 293 pp.
