= Fury (Rushdie novel) =

2001 novel by Salman Rushdie

- First edition
- Author: Salman Rushdie
- Language: English
- Genre: Fiction novel
- Publisher: Jonathan Cape
- Publication date: 2001
- Publication place: Great Britain
- Media type: Print (Hardcover)
- Pages: 259 pp
- ISBN: 0-224-06159-3
- OCLC: 47036146
- Preceded by: The Ground Beneath Her Feet
- Followed by: Shalimar the Clown

Fury, published in 2001, is the seventh novel by author Salman Rushdie. Rushdie depicts contemporary New York City as the epicenter of globalization and all of its tragic flaws.

== Plot summary ==
Malik Solanka, a Cambridge-educated millionaire from Bombay, is looking for an escape from himself. At first he escapes from his academic life by immersing himself in the world of miniatures (after becoming enamored with the miniature houses on display at the Rijksmuseum Amsterdam), eventually creating a puppet called "Little Brain" and leaving the academy for television.

However, dissatisfaction with the rising popularity of "Little Brain" serves to ignite deeper demons within Solanka's life, resulting in the narrowly avoided murder of his wife and child. To further escape, Solanka travels to New York, hopeful he can lose himself and his demons in America, only to find that he is forced to confront himself.
