= In the South (short story) =

In the South is a work of fiction by Salman Rushdie looking at the meaning of a life well lived from the points of view of two old men with very different personalities. First published in The New Yorker in 2009, it was reprinted in the collection The Eleventh Hour in 2025.

== Synopsis ==
The two men bear the same name (undisclosed throughout the story, but said to start with the letter "V") and are referred to as "Senior" and "Junior", although their ages are only 17 days apart. They live next door to each other in apartments with adjacent verandas. In spite of their parallel names, ages, life seasons, and retirement situations, the two men serve as foils for one another. Senior has lived a life full of rich experiences, stimulating discussions, and a vibrant family. However, the richness of his youth leads him to discount life under his present old-age conditions, and he finds himself constantly bitter and dissatisfied, longing for seasons gone by. Rude to those around him and pessimistic in most things, Senior is generally disagreeable, but his deep and loyal affection for Junior (although not often expressed) remains an endearing and redeeming quality throughout the story. Junior, meanwhile, has had a far less eventful life, characterized by mediocrity and never quite lived to its fullest. He had had an underwhelming career, never married, and never devoted himself to particularly passionate pursuits. Thus, while he is not "waiting to die" as Senior is, he is instead "still waiting to live." Nonetheless, Junior remains quite happy and optimistic about life, despite being disappointed in his own.

The story describes Senior and Junior as they go about their days, making the thirty-minute trek each week to cash in their pension checks and sitting on their verandas bickering back and forth. One day, Junior is hit by some girls on a Vespa and is struck down and instantly killed. Senior mourns his death deeply, wishing it were he instead. As more deaths strike the area due to a large tsunami, Senior laments that Death would take so many and yet leave him, who barely desires his meaningless life. Ultimately, he realizes that "death and life are just adjacent verandas."

In all of this, Rushdie explores two contrasting approaches to life and death, exhibiting both in their pains and joys, merits and shortcomings. Although opposing in their plights— Junior plagued by death, and Senior by life, Junior by a past unlived and Senior by a past that can never be lived up to— both men grapple with the same common themes of the human experience, coming together to show the double edge sword that is old-age survival, memory, and the passing of time.

It has been translated in Bengali by Ranak Zaman at 2018 book fair.
