= Two Years Eight Months and Twenty-Eight Nights =

2015 novel by Salman Rushdie

- Cover of first edition
- Author: Salman Rushdie
- Language: English
- Genre: Magic realism
- Publisher: Jonathan Cape
- Publication date: 10 September 2015
- Publication place: United Kingdom
- Media type: Print (hardback)
- Pages: 286 pp. (hardback)
- ISBN: 978-1910702031 (hardback)

Two Years Eight Months and Twenty-Eight Nights is a fantasy novel by British Indian author Salman Rushdie published by Jonathan Cape in 2015.

== Plot ==
The novel is set in New York City in the near future. It deals with jinns, and recounts the story of a jinnia princess and her offspring during the "strangenesses". After a great storm, slits between the world of jinns and the world of men are opened and strange phenomena emerge as dark jinnis invade the Earth. The jinnia princess and her children thus need to fight to defend the Earth and the humans from them, the Grand Ifrits. All the while, the Great Philosopher Averroes (Ibn Rushd) and the famous theologian Al-Ghazali pursue a philosophical debate about reason and God.

== Title ==
The title is a reference to the 1,001 nights Scheherazade spent telling stories in the Middle-Eastern story of One Thousand and One Nights.

== Critical reception ==
In a review of the book in The Guardian, Erica Wagner said that it is a "wonderful" novel and praised Rushdie: "the dark delights that spring from his imagination in this novel have the spellbinding energy that has marked the greatest storytellers since the days of Scheherazade." Also in The Guardian, Ursula K. Le Guin praises the novel's "fierce colours, [...] boisterousness, humour and tremendous pizzazz" and Rushdie's "fractal imagination".
