= Quichotte (novel) =

2019 novel by Salman Rushdie

- First edition cover (UK/India)
- Author: Salman Rushdie
- Audio read by: Vikas Adam
- Language: English
- Genre: Picaresque novel
- Publisher: Jonathan Cape
- Publication date: 29 August 2019
- Publication place: United Kingdom
- Media type: Print (Hardcover)
- Pages: 416
- ISBN: 978-1-78733-191-4
- Dewey Decimal: 823/.914
- LC Class: PR6068.U757 Q53 2019

Quichotte (UK: /kiːˈʃɒt/ kee-SHOT, French: [kiʃɔt]) is a 2019 novel by Salman Rushdie. It is his fourteenth novel, published on 29 August 2019 by Jonathan Cape in the United Kingdom and Penguin Books India in India. It was published in the United States on 3 September 2019 by Random House. Inspired by Miguel de Cervantes's classic novel Don Quixote, Quichotte is a metafiction that tells the story of an addled Indian-American man who travels across America in pursuit of a celebrity television host with whom he has become obsessed.

The novel received favourable reviews and was shortlisted for the 2019 Booker Prize.

== Plot ==
The protagonist, Sam DuChamp, is an Indian-born writer living in America and author of a number of unsuccessful spy thrillers. Hoping to write a book "radically unlike any other he had ever attempted", he creates the character of Ismail Smile. Smile, who was born in Bombay, is a travelling pharmaceutical salesman who has suffered a stroke in old age. He begins obsessively watching reality television and becomes infatuated with Salma R, a former Bollywood star who hosts a daytime talk show in New York City. Despite having never met her, he sends her love letters under the pen name "Quichotte". He begins a quest for her across America, driving in his Chevrolet Cruze with his imaginary son Sancho. The two experience contemporary issues of the United States, including racism, the opioid epidemic, familial love, and the impact of popular culture. The lives of the character Quichotte and the writer DuChamp intertwine as the story progresses.

== Background ==
In 2015, Salman Rushdie was re-reading Miguel de Cervantes' Don Quixote to write an introduction to a collection of stories inspired by Cervantes and William Shakespeare and prepare for a speech about the two writers. In an interview with Indian newspaper Mint, Rushdie described its inspiration: "Don Quixote is astonishingly modern, even postmodern—a novel whose characters know they are being written about and have opinions on the writing. I wanted my book to have a parallel storyline about my characters' creator and his life, and then slowly to show how the two stories, the two narrative lines, become one." Quichotte features a story within a story, making it, similar to Cervantes's novel, a metafiction. The novel's protagonist writer Sam DuChamp has been compared to Cide Hamete Benengeli, a fictional Arab writer whose manuscripts Cervantes claimed to translate the majority of Don Quixote from as a metafictional trick to give a greater credibility to the text. In Quichotte, Ismail Smile's obsession with Salma R and his subsequent adoption of the pseudonym "Quichotte" parallel that of Alonso Quijano, the fictional hidalgo who renames himself "Don Quixote" after falling into madness. "Quichotte" is the French spelling of "Quixote" and is a reference to French composer Jules Massenet's 1910 opera Don Quichotte. Further, it is referenced within the novel that the word sounds like "key shot," which is a way to ingest drugs - one of the novel's themes. Quichotte's imaginary son Sancho was named after Sancho Panza, who similarly acts as squire to Don Quixote. Salma R is seen as similar to Don Quixote's Dulcinea del Toboso.

=== Publication history ===
- Quichotte. United Kingdom: Jonathan Cape. 29 August 2019. ISBN 978-1-78733-191-4.
- Quichotte. India: Penguin Books India. 29 August 2019. ISBN 978-0-670-09279-6.
- Quichotte. United States: Random House. 3 September 2019. ISBN 978-0-593-13298-2.

== Reception ==
The novel debuted at number fifteen on The New York Times Hardcover fiction best-seller list for the week ending September 14, 2019.

Kirkus Reviews called the novel "humane and humorous," adding that "Rushdie is in top form, serving up a fine piece of literary satire." Publishers Weekly called the novel "a brilliant rendition of the cheesy, sleazy, scary pandemonium of life in modern times." Claire Lowdon of The Sunday Times gave the novel a rave review, saying, "Quichotte is one of the cleverest, most enjoyable metafictional capers this side of postmodernism" and that "we are still watching a master at work."

In her review for The New York Times Book Review, author Jeanette Winterson said, "The lovely, unsentimental, heart-affirming ending of Quichotte, that "sane man," is the aslant answer to the question of what is real and what is unreal. A remembrance of what holds our human lives in some equilibrium — a way of feeling and a way of telling. Love and language." Writing for Booklist, Donna Seaman said, "Rushdie's dazzling and provocative improvisation on an essential classic has powerful resonance in this time of weaponized lies and denials." Nicholas Mancusi, writing for Time, praised the novel, saying, "As he weaves the journeys of the two men nearer and nearer, sweeping up a full accounting of all the tragicomic horrors of modern American life in the process, these energies begin to collapse beautifully inward, like a dying star." Writing for The Times, Robert Douglas-Fairhurst praised the novel, calling it a "welcome return to form. More than just another postmodern box of tricks, this is a novel that feeds the heart while it fills the mind." Jude Cook of i called the novel a "wildly entertaining return to form" and said of Rushdie: "Now in his eighth decade, it is clear he still possesses the linguistic energy, resourcefulness and sheer amplitude of a writer half his age."

Ron Charles, a book critic at The Washington Post, gave the novel a mixed review and wrote, "Rushdie's style once unfurled with hypnotic elegance, but here it's become a fire hose of brainy gags and literary allusions — tremendously clever but frequently tedious." Johanna Thomas-Corr, writing for The Observer, gave the novel a mixed review, finding Rushdie "swollen with the junk culture he intended to critique" but also saying he is "the best of his generation at writing women. Both Salma and Jack are witty, opinionated and complex." Christian Lorentzen wrote a similarly mixed review for the Financial Times, calling it an "uneven but diverting and occasionally brilliant novel" and saying, "There's a strange contradiction at work when a book whose declared metafictional mission is to combat 'junk culture' is also overloaded with cultural detritus." Sukhdev Sandhu of The Guardian agreed as well, writing, "This is not uninteresting territory for a writer to delve into, but Quichotte is too restless and in love with itself to be anything other than a symptom of the malaise it laments." Writing for the New Statesman, lead fiction writer Leo Robson panned the novel, calling it "draining" and saying, "We're simply stuck with an author prone to lapses in tact and taste, and a lack of respect for the reader's time or powers of concentration."

== See also ==
- 2017 Olathe, Kansas shooting
