= List of Iranians =

This is an alphabetic list of notable people from Iran or its historical predecessors.

== In the news ==
- Mohammad Bagher Ghalibaf, former Mayor of Tehran, Speaker of the Islamic Consultative Assembly
- Ali Dizaei, former senior officer in the London Metropolitan Police
- Anousheh Ansari, Iranian-American first female space tourist in the world, telecommunication entrepreneur and namesake of the Ansari X Prize
- Bahar Soomekh, Iranian-American actress
- Camila Batmanghelidjh, Iranian-Belgian founder of London-based children's charity Kids Company
- Reza Pahlavi, son of the deposed Shah of Iran, crown prince in exile.
- Shirin Ebadi, recipient of 2003 Nobel Peace Prize
- Akbar Ganji, journalist and writer
- Hossein Ronaghi, human rights activist

== Artists ==
=== Calligraphists ===
- Gholam Hossein Amirkhani
- Abolhassan Etessami
- Fakhr Jahan Khanum
- Mir Emad Hassani
- Seyyed Jafar Kashfi
- Yadollah Kaboli Khansari
- Mishkín-Qalam
- Jalil Rasouli
- Mehdi Saeedi
- Mir Ali Tabrizi

=== Cartoonists ===
- Golnar Servatian
- Javad Alizadeh
- Maziyar Bizhani
- Nikahang Kowsar
- Mana Neyestani
- Touka Neyestani

=== Painters, illustrators and sculptors ===
- Abolhassan Khan Sadighi
- Ali Akbar Sadeghi
- Amir Shayesteh Tabar
- Aydin Aghdashloo
- Bahram Soroush
- Daryush Shokof
- Farhad Sadeghi Amini
- Gholamhossein Saber
- Haydar Hatemi
- Hossein Behzad
- Hossein Valamanesh
- Hossein Zenderoudi
- Iran Darroudi
- Jazeh Tabatabai
- Kamal ol-Molk
- Kamaleddin Behzad
- Mahmoud Farshchian
- Mani
- Maryam Hashemi (Maryam Sandjari)
- Mohammad Ali Taraghijah
- Mohsen Vaziri-Moghaddam
- Mokarrameh Ghanbari
- Noreen Motamed
- Afshin Naghouni
- Parviz Tanavoli
- Reza Abbasi
- Shahla Aghapour
- Shahla Arbabi
- Shirazeh Houshiary
- Siah Armajani
- Sohrab Sepehri
- Zhaleh Kazemi

=== Photographers ===
- Abbas
- Abbas Kiarostami
- Alfred Yaghobzadeh
- Ali Ghanbari
- Ali Khan Vali
- Jahangir Razmi
- Kaveh Golestan
- Maryam Zandi
- Mitra Tabrizian
- Morteza Avini
- Nader Davoodi
- Nasrollah Kasraian
- Newsha Tavakolian
- Reza Deghati
- Hossein Rajabian
- Sadegh Tirafkan
- Shadi Ghadirian
- Shahram Entekhabi
- Shirana Shahbazi
- Shirin Neshat

== Designers ==
=== Architects ===
- Hossein Amanat
- Kamran Diba
- Heydar Ghiaï-Chamlou
- Fariborz Sahba

=== Fashion designers ===
- Pegah Anvarian (born 1974), Iranian-born American fashion designer; based in Los Angeles
- Bijan
- Shirin Guild, Iranian-born British fashion designer
- Arefeh Mansouri (born 1980), Iranian-born Canadian fashion and costume designer
- Behnaz Sarafpour (born 1969), Iranian-born American couture fashion designer; based in New York City
- Mahla Zamani (1950–2023), fashion designer, journalist; expert on traditional Iranian clothing

=== Graphic designers ===
- Reza Abedini
- Farshid Mesghali
- Morteza Momayez
- Mehdi Saeedi
- Ghobad Shiva

=== Industrial designers ===
- Nader Faghihzadeh
- Alexander Kostellow
- Iman Maghsoudi
- Mona Paad
- Sohrab Vossoughi

== Business ==
- Kia Joorabchian, businessman
- Hooman Radfar, American entrepreneur
- Nasser David Khalili, British billionaire and art collector
- Afsaneh Beschloss (born 1956), Iranian-born American former treasurer of the World Bank, economist, entrepreneur, and investor, CEO of RockCreek, an investment firm that she founded
- Mandana Dayani (born 1982), Iranian-American businesswoman and media executive
- Fatemeh Moghimi (born 1958), engineer, entrepreneur, and political activist
- Shahrzad Rafati (born 1979), Iranian-Canadian CEO of BroadbandTV Corp (BBTV)
- Maryam Rofougaran (born 1968), Iranian-American electrical engineer, CEO and co-founder of Innovent Systems, Inc. and Movandi; member of the CNBC CEO Council
- Sheherazade Semsar-de Boisséson (born 1968), French-Iranian

== Entertainers ==
=== Comedians ===
- Baba Ali, Islamic comedy
- Max Amini
- Omid Djalili
- Negin Farsad
- Shahin Jamie
- Maz Jobrani
- Shaparak Khorsandi
- Hadi Khorsandi
- Ebrahim Nabavi
- Nasim Pedrad

=== Dancers and choreographers ===
- Jamileh
- Farzaneh Kaboli, folkloric
- Moshtari Khanum
- Nima Kiann
- Shahrokh Moshkin Ghalam, folkloric

=== Models, beauty pageant ===
- Nazanin Afshin-Jam (born 1979), Iranian-Canadian actress, singer-songwriter, human-rights activist; Miss World 2003 first runner-up; Miss Canada 2003
- Ramona Amiri, Iranian-Canadian Miss Canada 2005
- Sara Nicole Andersen (born 1992), Norwegian-Iranian Miss Universe Norway 2012
- Sahar Biniaz (born 1986), Persian-Canadian Miss Universe Canada 2012
- Mahlagha Jaberi (born 1989), Iranian-American influencer and Instagram model
- Aylar Lie (born 1984), Iranian-born Norwegian actress, model, singer, former pornographic actress
- Melika Razavi, Iranian-South African Miss Iran 2016, Miss Global Fitness 2016, and Miss Power Woman 2017
- Apameh Schönauer (born 1984), German-Iranian Miss Germany 2024
- Shermine Shahrivar (born 1982), Iranian-German Miss Germany 2004, Miss Europe 2005
- Samantha Tajik (born 1983), Iranian-Canadian Miss Universe Canada 2008

=== Film actors ===
- Akbar Abdi
- Alan Mehdizadeh, British-Iranian actor
- Ali Mosaffa
- Ali Nassirian
- Amin Hayaee
- Amirhossein Arman
- Artemis Pebdani, American actress
- Asghar Farhadi
- Azita Hajian
- Bahar Soomekh (born 1975), Iranian-born American actress, Crash and Saw III
- Bahram Radan
- Behrouz Vossoughi
- Behzad Farahani
- Bijan Daneshmand
- Bita Farrahi
- Bizhan Emkanian
- Catherine Bell (born 1968), British-American actress, JAG, half Iranian
- Christiane Amanpour, British-Iranian journalist and television host
- Daryoush Arjmand
- Daryush Shokof
- Davoud Rashidi
- Delkash
- Elnaaz Norouzi, German actress
- Ezzatollah Entezami
- Faramarz Gharibian
- Farimah Farjami, Iranian and French actress
- Fatemeh Motamed-Aria
- Golab Adineh
- Golshifteh Farahani (born 1983), Iranian-French actress
- Googoosh (born 1950), actress, singer, songwriter
- Hamed Behdad
- Hedyeh Tehrani (born 1972), actress
- Homa Rousta
- Homayoun Ershadi
- Jahangir Forouhar
- Jamileh Sheykhi
- Jamshid Mashayekhi
- Kamshad Kooshan, Iranian-born American actor
- Kazem HajirAzad
- Khosrow Shakibaee
- Leila Forouhar
- Leila Hatami (born 1972), actress, was in the Academy Award-winning film A Separation
- Mahaia Petrosian
- Mahnaz Afshar (born 1978), Iranian-born German actress
- Majid Majidi
- Mandana Karimi
- Maz Jobrani, American comedian and actor
- Mehdi Fat'hi
- Mehdi Hashemi (actor)
- Mehran Modiri
- Merila Zarei
- Mohammad Ali Fardin
- Mohammad Ali Keshavarz
- Mohammad Reza Foroutan
- Mohammad Reza Golzar
- Mohammad Reza Sharifinia
- Navid Mohammadzadeh
- Nazanin Afshin-Jam
- Nematollah Aghasi
- Niki Karimi (born 1971), actress, film director, and screenwriter
- Omid Ahangar
- Parsa Pirouzfar
- Parviz Fannizadeh
- Parviz Parastouee
- Parviz Sayyad
- Pegah Ahangarani
- Reza Kianian
- Reza Rahardian, Indonesian actor, model, singer, director, and radio announcer
- Roxanne Pallett, English actress, television personality, and broadcaster
- Roya Nonahali
- Saeed Rad
- Sam Asghari, Iranian-American model and actor
- Sarah Shahi (born 1980), American actress and former cheerleader, of Iranian-Spanish ancestry
- Shaghayegh Farahani
- Shahab Hosseini
- Shohreh Aghdashloo (born 1952), Iranian-American actress, Oscar nominee 2003 for House of Sand and Fog
- Sussan Taslimi, Iranian-Swedish film and theatre actress, director and screenwriter
- Taraneh Alidousti
- Zahra Amir Ebrahimi (born 1981), Iranian-French actress and social photographer

=== Theatre and stage actors ===
- Mehdi Bajestani
- Taha Behbahani
- Mohsen Shah Ebrahimi
- Behzad Farahani
- Shamsi Fazlollahi
- Alan Mehdizadeh
- Ali Nassirian
- Hayley Tamaddon
- Kazem HajirAzad
- Ahmad Saatchian
- Mohammad Reza Jozi
- Ramin Karimloo
- Roya Teymourian
- Shiva Boloorian

== Filmmakers, directors ==
=== Filmmakers ===
- Abbas Kiarostami, director of Taste of Cherry
- Abdolhossein Sepanta
- Hassan Hajgozar
- Abolfazl Jalili
- Ali Ardekani
- Ali Hatami
- Ali Sajadi Hoseini
- Amir Naderi
- Asghar Farhadi, director of A Separation
- Babak Payami
- Bahman Farman-Ara
- Bahman Ghobadi, director of A Time for Drunken Horses
- Bahman Maghsoudlou
- Bahram Beizai
- Behrooz Gharibpoor
- Daryush Shokof
- Darius Khondji
- Darius Mehrjui
- Desiree Akhavan, director of Appropriate Behavior
- Ebrahim Hatamikia
- Emud Mokhberi, Academy Award-nominated director and animator
- Esma'il Kooshan
- Houman Seyyedi
- Iraj Ghaderi
- Jafar Panahi, director of The Circle
- Kamal Tabrizi
- Kami Asgar
- Kamran Shirdel
- Kamshad Kooshan
- Khosrow Sinai
- Kiarash Anvari
- Kiumars Pourahmad
- Mahdi Bemani Naeini
- Majid Majidi, director of Children of Heaven
- Masoud Kimiai
- Mehran Modiri
- Mohsen Makhmalbaf, director of Kandahar
- Mostafa Keshvari
- Nasser Taghvai
- Parviz Kimiavi
- Hossein Rajabian, director of The Upside-down Triangle
- Parviz Nouri
- Shabnam Rezaei
- Parviz Shahbazi
- Parviz Sayyad
- Bob Yari, Iranian-born American film producer
- Pouran Derakhshandeh, award-winning film director and producer
- Rakhshan Bani-Etemad
- Ramin Farahani
- Rasoul Mollagholipour
- Reza Badiyi
- Sadaf Foroughi
- Samira Makhmalbaf, director of At Five in the Afternoon
- Samuel Khachikian
- Sohrab Shahid-Sales
- Saeed Roustayi
- Tina Gharavi

=== Theatre and stage directors ===
- Akbar Radi
- Bahram Bayzai
- Behrouz Gharibpour
- Ghotbeddin Sadeghi
- Hengameh Mofid
- Hossein Rajabian
- Mostafa Oskooyi
- Reza Shirmarz
- Shiva Boloorian

== Musicians and singers ==
=== Classical ===
==== Iranian classical traditional ====
- Abolhasan Saba
- Alinaghi Vaziri
- Alireza Eftekhari
- Dariush Eghbali
- Elaheh
- Gholam-Hossein Banan
- Homayoun Shajarian
- Hossein Alizadeh
- Hossein Khaje Amiri
- Hossein Tehrani
- Jalal Zolfonun
- Javad Maroofi
- Kamkarha
- Kayhan Kalhor
- Mahmoud Zoulfonoun
- Maryam Akhondy
- Marzieh
- Mehdi Rajabian
- Mirza Abdollah Farahani
- Mohammad Reza Lotfi
- Mohammad-Reza Shajarian
- Mohammad Shams
- Mohsen Namjoo
- Morteza Hannaneh
- Moshtari Khanum
- Nashit
- Nur Ali Elahi
- Parisa
- Parviz Meshkatian
- Parviz Yahaghi
- Ruhollah Khaleghi
- Shahram Nazeri
- Sima Bina
- Zyriab

==== Modern traditional ====
- Ahmad Pejman
- Axiom of Choice
- Farhad Fakhreddini
- Morteza Hannaneh
- Niyaz
- Ramin Rahimi
- Zohreh Jooya
- Mehdi Rajabian
- Sina Bathaie

==== Western classical ====
- Ali Rahbari
- Alireza Mashayekhi
- Amin Homaei
- Aminollah Hossein
- Anoushiravan Rohani
- Armik
- Hangi Tavakoli
- Heshmat Sandjari
- Loris Tjeknavorian (Loris Cheknavarian)
- Lotfi Mansouri
- Mahan Esfahani
- Sahba Aminikia
- Mehdi Hosseini
- Nader Mashayekhi
- Reza Najfar
- Shahrdad Rohani
- Hooman Khalatbari

=== Electronic ===
- Ali "Dubfire" Shirazinia
- Ali Movasat (DJ Aligator)
- Ashkan Kooshanejad
- Deep Dish
- Leila Arab
- Sharam Tayebi
- Sina Bathaie
- Steve Naghavi from And One

=== Pop ===
- Alireza Assar
- Alireza Talischi
- Andy Madadian
- Anousheh Khalili (born 1983), Iranian–American singer-songwriter
- Arash
- Aref
- Arian Band
- Benyamin Arefi
- Bijan Mortazavi
- Darius Danesh
- Dariush Eghbali
- Delkash (1925–2004; also known as Esmat Bagherpour Baboli), singer and actress
- Ebi
- Faramarz Aslani
- Farhad
- Fereidoun Foroughi
- Googoosh
- Habib
- Hassan Sattar
- Hassan Shamaizadeh
- Hayadeh
- Homeyra
- Ilya Salmanzadeh
- Kouros
- Leila Forouhar (born 1959), pop and classical singer, based in Los Angeles
- Mahasti (1946–2007), Persian classical, folk, and pop music singer; lived in California
- Mansour
- May J.
- Mehrdad
- Moein
- Mohammad Esfahani
- Mohammad Nouri
- Pyruz
- Reza Sadeghi
- Sepideh (born 1975), Iranian-American singer
- Sevdaliza
- Siavash Ghomeyshi
- Shahkar Binesh Pazhooh
- Shahram Shabpareh
- Shahrum K
- Shohreh Solati (born 1957), Iranian–American singer
- Snoh Aalegra
- Susan Roshan
- Toofan
- Vigen
- Leila Arab (born 1971), musician, record producer and DJ based in London
- Roya Arab (born 1967), Iranian-British musician, archaeologist, singer and songwriter
- Hayedeh (1942–1990; also known as Ma'soumeh Dadehbala), pop and classical singer; lived in Los Angeles
- Anousheh Khalili (born 1983), Iranian–American singer-songwriter
- Laleh Pourkarim (born 1982), Iranian–Swedish singer-songwriter, musician, record producer, actress
- Rita (born 1962; Rita Jahanforuz), Iranian-born Israeli singer and actress, represented Israel in the Eurovision Song Contest
- Shakila (born 1962), Iranian–American singer, winner of Persian Academy Award (2006); based in San Diego, California

=== Rap music ===
- Amir Tataloo
- Hichkas
- Yas
- Zedbazi
- Shahin Najafi
- Bahram
- Erfan
- Hangi Tavakoli, Multi-Platinum music producer and songwriter

==== Lyricists ====
- Aref Ghazvini
- Hangi Tavakoli
- Hossein Monzavi
- Leila Kasra
- Maryam Heydarzadeh
- Rahim Moeini Kermanshahi
- Shahyar Ghanbari

=== Rock and metal ===
- Amir Derakh, from the band Orgy
- Angband
- Barad
- Kiosk

=== Film score composers ===
- Ahmad Pejman
- Fariborz Lachini
- Hangi Tavakoli
- Hossein Alizadeh
- Majid Entezami
- Mehdi Rajabian
- Peyman Yazdanian
- Ramin Djawadi

== Journalists, media ==
=== Bloggers ===
- Hossein Derakhshan
- Massoumeh Ebtekar
- Mehdi Jami
- Mohammad Ali Abtahi
- Mohammad Reza Pourshajari
- Mojtaba Saminejad
- Omid Memarian
- Sina Motalebi

=== Journalists ===
- Akbar Ganji
- Ali Akbar Abdolrashidi
- Ali Akbar Dehkhoda
- Alireza Jafarzadeh
- Alireza Nourizadeh
- Arash Markazi
- Azadeh Ensha, The New York Times
- Azadeh Moaveni
- Christiane Amanpour (born 1958), British–Iranian, CNN's chief international correspondent
- Ebrahim Nabavi
- Emadeddin Baghi
- Farjam Behnam
- Farrokhi Yazdi, Pahlavi era
- Hashem Aghajari
- Hossein Shariatmadari
- Mostafa Javadi Pour Moradi
- Kaveh Golestan, BBC
- Kioumars Saberi Foumani
- Mahshid Amirshahi
- Masih Alinejad (born 1976), Iranian-American journalist, author, and political activist critical of the status of human and women's rights in Iran
- Masoud Dehnamaki
- Massoud Behnoud
- Mehran Ghassemi
- Mirzadeh Eshghi
- Hossein Rajabian
- Mohammad Taghi Bahar
- Nikahang Kowsar
- Omid Memarian
- Mohammad Mosaed
- Rudi Bakhtiar (born 1966), Iranian-American television news anchor
- Saeed Hajjarian
- Saeed Kamali Dehghan
- Shadi Sadr (born 1974), feminist activist, lawyer and journalist, based in the United Kingdom
- Sina Motallebi
- Youness Shokrkhah
- Maziar Bahari
- Saeed Kamali Dehghan
- Kasra Nouri, journalist and political activist
- Camelia Entekhabifard (born 1973), Iranian-American journalist and author
- Faezeh Hashemi (born 1963), journalist, women rights activist, and former member of Iranian parliament
- Atoosa Rubenstein (born 1972), Iranian-American founder and editor of CosmoGirl magazine; editor of Seventeen
- Roxana Saberi (born 1977), American journalist for CBS News, imprisoned in Evin Prison and sentenced to 8-year prison term under accusations of espionage, released after 101 days
- Iran Teymourtash (1914–1991), journalist and early activist; daughter of Abdolhossein Teymourtash

=== News anchors ===
- Adel Ferdosipour, football announcer, Navad program
- Ali Akbar Abdolrashidi, correspondent, commentator, anchorman
- Mehrdad Kia, T.V. and Radio Broadcaster and executive producer in television and music industry.
- Alireza Jafarzadeh, Foreign Affairs Analyst, Fox News
- Christiane Amanpour, television journalist, CNN
- Fereydoun Farrokhzad, TV personality and opposition figure
- Jian Ghomeshi, musician, writer, and former CBC radio broadcaster
- Maryam Namazi, news anchor at Al Jazeera (English section)
- Reza Fazeli, actor, film director and opposition figure
- Rudi Bakhtiar, news anchor, formerly with CNN and Fox News

== Leaders, politicians, activists ==
This list excludes royalty, which can be accessed by the main article link above.

=== Historical ===
- Cyrus the Great, Iranian emperor and the founder of Iran
- Darius the Great, Iranian emperor
- Mithridates I of Parthia, Iranian emperor
- Ismail I, Iranian king
- Fazlollah Noori, conservative clergy opposing Constitutionalists; hanged
- Ghaem Magham Farahani, prime minister
- Hassan-e-Sabbah, sectarian political leader
- Kaveh the Blacksmith, mythical leader and liberator against the rule of Zahhak, an Arab king
- Mahmud Khan Puladeen, senior military general
- Maziar, son of Karan; leader of the Persian uprising against Arabs
- Mirza Kuchek Khan, constitutionalist leader of Guilan
- Mirza Mehdi Khan Astarabadi, Nader Shah's Chief Minister
- Mirza Reza Kermani, assassinated Nasereddin Shah
- Mohammad Khiabani, popular leader during Constitutionalist Revolution
- Mohammad Mossadegh, prime minister
- Mostowfi ol-Mamalek, prime minister
- Nosrat Dowleh Firouz Mirza, provincial governor
- Safi-ad-din Ardabili, spiritual founder of Safavid dynasty
- Sattar Khan, constitutionalist leader
- Heshmat Taleqani, Jangali leader and ally of Mirza Kuchek Khan
- Abbas the Great

=== Modern (post-Qajar) ===
==== Pahlavi period ====
- Abdol Hossein Hamzavi, Iranian diplomat, author and representative to the United Nations
- Abdol Karim Ayadi, personal physician to Reza Pahlavi
- Ali Akbar Davar, minister, and founder of Iran's modern judiciary system
- Ali Akbar Siassi, Chancellor of Tehran University
- Ali Gholi Ardalan, Iranian ambassador to the US, West Germany and the USSR
- Amanullah Jahanbani, senior military leader, and father-in-law of Christiane Amanpour's father
- Amir Abdollah Tahmasebi, military leader
- Ardeshir Zahedi
- Bahram Aryana, military commander
- Ahmad Ahmadi, prison interrogator
- Farokhroo Parsa, minister of education
- George Malek-Yonan, procured a seat in Iran's Parliament for Assyrians as a recognized minority
- Hasan Arfa, Army General, Ambassador to Russia, Ambassador to Turkey
- Hassan Modarres, member of Parliament
- Hassan Pakravan, head of SAVAK
- Heidar Arfaa, Conseiller d'État, Minister of Agriculture, Député-Majlis Fars province
- Hossein Fardoust, deputy head of SAVAK
- Hossein Fatemi, Minister of Foreign Affairs
- Hushang Ansary, Minister of Finance, President of NIOC
- Karim Buzarjomehri, Army General military aide of Reza Shah, Mayor of Tehran
- Mahmoud Jafarian, head of National Iranian Radio and Television and Pars News Agency
- Mahmoud Khayami, industrialist
- Mahmud Mahmud, politician
- Manucher Mirza Farman Farmaian, director of sales for NIOC and Ambassador to Venezuela
- Mohammad Ali Keshavarz Sadr, Mossadegh's Deputy and a leader of the Second National Front
- Nader Jahanbani, air force general, pilot
- Nasser Moghaddam, head of SAVAK
- Nematollah Nassiri, head of SAVAK
- Abbas Mirza Farman Farmaian, Minister of Parliament
- Sattareh Farman Farmaian, established first social worker schools in Iran
- Sepahbod Ahmad Amir-Ahmadi, military leader
- Seyyed Zia'eddin Tabatabaee
- Shapour Bakhtiar, prime minister
- Soraya Esfandiary Bakhtiari
- Teymour Bakhtiar, head of SAVAK
- Abdolhossein Teymourtash, Iranian statesman
- Mirza Javad Khan Ameri, Minister, MP

==== Served in Islamic Republic government ====
- Abdolkarim Mousavi-Ardabili, reformist politician and Twelver shi'a marja
- Abdollah Noori, minister of interior
- Abdollah Ramezanzadeh, government spokesman
- Abdolvahed Mousavi-Lari, minister of interior
- Abolhassan Banisadr, president
- Ahmad Jannati, chair of Council of Guardians
- Ahmad Khatami, member of Guardian Council andof the Assembly of Experts
- Ahmad Khomeini, Custodian of the Mausoleum of Khomeini
- Ahmad Tavakkoli, minister of labour
- Akbar Torkan, minister of roads and transportation
- Ala'eddin Boroujerdi, member of parliament
- Ali Akbar Hashemi Rafsanjani, president
- Ali Akbar Mohtashamipour, member of parliament
- Ali Akbar Nategh-Nouri, speaker of parliament
- Ali Akbar Salehi, academic, diplomat and former head of the Atomic Energy Organization of Iran
- Ali Fallahian, minister of intelligence
- Ali Khamenei, supreme leader
- Ali Larijani, president of IRIB
- Ali Meshkini, chair of Assembly of Experts
- Ali Movahhedi-Kermani
- Ali Shamkhani, minister of defence
- Ali Younessi, minister of information
- Alireza Noori, member of parliament
- Asadollah Lajevardi
- Ata’allah Hakimi
- Ata'ollah Mohajerani, minister of culture and Islamic guidance
- Ayatollah Amini, deputy chair of Assembly of Experts
- Ayatollah Mohammadi-Gilani
- Ayatollah Sane'i
- Ayatollah Va'ez-Tabasi
- Ayatollah Mohammad Taghi Mesbah Yazdi
- Behzad Nabavi, vice speaker of parliament
- Bizhan Namdar-Zangeneh, minister of oil
- Ebrahim Asgharzadeh
- Ebrahim Yazdi, foreign minister of interim government
- Elaheh Koulai, member of parliament
- Emad Afrough, member of parliament
- Faezeh Hashemi Rafsanjani, member of parliament
- Fatemeh Haghighatjou, member of parliament
- Gholam Ali Haddad-Adel, speaker of parliament
- Gholam Hossein Elham
- Ghorbanali Dorri-Najafabadi, minister of intelligence
- Habiballah Dahamardeh
- Grand Ayatollah Hossein-Ali Montazeri
- Hadi Khamenei, member of parliament
- Hamid Reza Assefi, foreign affairs spokesman
- Hassan Habibi, first vice president
- Hassan Rouhani, former president
- Hojjatallah Firouzi
- Hossein Shariatmadari
- Iraj Fazel, minister of health
- Izzatallah Akbari Talarpashti
- Ezzatollah Zarghami, president of IRIB
- Kamal Daneshyar, member of the Islamic Consultative Assembly
- Kamal Kharrazi, minister of foreign affairs
- Kazem Jalali, politician
- Kazem Rajavi, politician
- Kazem Seddiqi, politician
- Lotfollah Forouzandeh (born 1961) Iranian Politician
- Lotfallah Siahkali
- Lotfallah Zara’i Qanawati
- Mahmoud Ahmadinejad, former president
- Mahmoud Hashemi Shahroudi, former chief justice
- Majid Ansari, member of parliament
- Manuchehr Eliasi, Jewish member of parliament
- Masoud Pezeshkian, minister of health
- Masoumeh Ebtekar, vice president
- Mehdi Bazargan, prime minister
- Mehdi Hashemi
- Mehdi Karroubi, speaker of parliament
- Mir-Hossein Mousavi, prime minister
- Mohammad Abaee-Khorasani, member of parliament
- Mohammad Ali Abtahi, vice president
- Mohammad Ali Najafi, minister of education, mathematician, and murderer
- Mohammad Ali Rajai, president
- Mohammad Beheshti, head of judiciary
- Mohammad Emami-Kashani, member of the Assembly of Experts
- Mohammad Hashemi Rafsanjani, member of the Expediency Discernment Council
- Mohammad Javad Bahonar, prime minister
- Mohammad Javad Larijani, member of parliament
- Mohammad Khatami, president
- Mohammad Reyshahri
- Mohammad Reza Aref, first vice president
- Mohammad Reza Bahonar, vice speaker of parliament
- Mohammad Reza Khatami, deputy speaker of parliament
- Mohammad Reza Mahdavi-Kani
- Mohammad Sattarifar, vice president
- Mohammad Yazdi, head of judiciary
- Mohsen Armin, member of parliament
- Mohsen Mirdamadi, member of parliament
- Mohsen Nourbakhsh, head of Central Bank of Iran
- Mohsen Rezaee, member of Expediency Discernment Council
- Mohsen Safaee-Farahani, member of parliament and head of Iranian Football Federation
- Mohseni-Ezhe'i
- Moin al-Din Saeedi
- Morteza Motahhari
- Mostafa Chamran, Minister of Defense
- Mostafa Tajzadeh, deputy minister of interior
- Nasrollah Jahangard, chair of Supreme Council of ICT
- Nimatallah Manuchehri, Iranian Politician
- Qodratallah Hamzeh, Iranian politician
- Qodratallah Hussaynipour, Iranian Politician
- Qodratallah Imani
- Qodratallah Intazami, Iranian politician
- Ghodratollah Norouzi, Iranian politician
- Rahim Safavi
- Rahmatallah Firouzi Pourbadi
- Rasoul Montajebnia, member of parliament
- Ruhallah Abbaspour, Iranian Politician
- Ruhallah Baba’i Saleh
- Ruhallah Hazratpour Talahieh
- Ruhollah Hosseinian
- Ruhallah Izadkhahzadeh
- Ruhollah Khomeini, supreme leader, founder of the Islamic Republic
- Ruhallah Motfikar Azad
- Ruhallah Najabat
- Sadegh Ghotbzadeh, minister of foreign affairs
- Sadegh Khalkhali, Sharia ruler
- Sadegh Larijani
- Saeed Emami, vice minister of intelligence
- Saeed Hajjarian, Tehran council member
- Saeed Mortazavi
- Seyed Mohammad Hossein Adeli, head of Central Bank of Iran, Ambassador to United Kingdom
- Waliallah Farzanah, Iranian Politician
- Zabihallah Azami Sardoui, Iranian Politician
- Zia-Allah Ezazi Maleki, Iranian Politician

==== Not served in Islamic Republic government or opposition ====
- Abbas Amir-Entezam
- Abdolrahman Ghasemlou
- Abolghasem Kashani
- Ahmad Zirakzadeh
- Ali Shariati, sociologist
- Ali Latifiyan, Iranian writer
- Alireza Rajaei
- Asghar Parsa
- Azam Taleghani
- Bijan Jazani
- Dariush Forouhar
- Ezzatollah Sahabi
- Gholam-Hossein Sadighi
- Habibollah Peiman
- Hashem Aghajari
- Jafar Pishevari
- Mahmoud Taleghani
- Mansoor Hekmat
- Maryam Rajavi
- Massoud Rajavi, militant opposition leader
- Mehdi Khalaji
- Mohsen Sazegara
- Mousa Sadr
- Nasser Zarafshan
- Navvab Safavi, militant cleric
- Parviz Varjavand
- Roozbeh Farahanipour, founder of Marze Por Gohar
- Shirin Ebadi, recipient of 2003 Nobel Peace Prize
- Yadollah Sahabi

=== Politicians in other nations ===
- Haleh Afshar (1941–2022; also known as the Baroness Afshar), Iranian-British life peer in the House of Lords, professor at the University of York
- Raumesh Akbari (born 1984), Iranian-American and Black politician and lawyer, Tennessee State Representative
- Goli Ameri, Iranian-American United States Assistant Secretary of State for Educational and Cultural Affairs
- Benazir Bhutto, former Prime Minister of Pakistan; half-Iranian (mother Nusrat Bhutto)
- Nusrat Bhutto, Iranian-Pakistani former first lady of Pakistan, 2nd chairperson of the social democratic Pakistan People's Party (1979–84), Senior Minister of Pakistan (1989–90)
- Jimmy Delshad, Iranian-American mayor of Beverly Hills, California
- George Deukmejian, American former Governor of California
- Dan Halutz, Chief of Staff of the Israeli Defense Forces
- Saadat Khan, first Nawab of Oudh in India
- Anna Kaplan (née Monahemi), Iranian-born American, member of the New York State Senate
- Farah Karimi, Iranian-Dutch female Dutch Member of Parliament
- Moshe Katsav, former President of Israel
- Tahia Kazem, former first lady of Egypt, wife of President Gamal Abdel Nasser
- Omid Nouripour, German-Iranian member of the German parliament (Bundestag), Germany
- Ross Mirkarimi, American former member of San Francisco City Council from Green Party; American of Iranian and Russian descent.
- Reza Moridi, member of the Legislative Assembly of Ontario, Canada
- Shaul Mofaz, Israeli Minister of Transport and a Deputy Prime Minister, and former Minister of Defense
- Darya Safai, Iranian-born Belgian member of the Belgian Chamber of Representatives.
- Wajid Ali Shah, last Nawab of Oudh, disposed of by the British East India Company
- Maryam Yazdanfar, Iranian-Swedish member of the Swedish parliament (Riksdag), Sweden

=== Activists ===
- Mahnaz Afkhami (born 1941), politician and human rights and women's rights activist, served in the Cabinet of Iran (1976–1978)
- Neda Agha-Soltan (1983–2009), shot during the 2009 Iranian election protests; her name quickly became a rallying cry for the opposition
- Bibi Khatoon Astarabadi (1858/9 – 1921), author and pioneer of the Persian women's movement in modern Iran
- Shiva Nazar-Ahari, human-rights activist, journalist, co-founder of Committee of Human Rights Reporters, jailed several times in Evin Prison, moved to Slovenia
- Elham Modaressi (born 1990), artist and activist
- Asra Panahi (2007–2022), fifteen-year-old girl beaten and killed during the Mahsa Amini protests
- Maryam Rajavi (born 1953), President of the National Council of Resistance of Iran; leader of the People's Mujahedin of Iran, lives in France
- Shadi Sadr (born 1974), lawyer, human rights advocate, essayist and journalist, incarcerated in Evin Prison, lives in Germany
- Azadeh Shahshahani (born 1979), Iranian–American human rights lawyer and former president of the National Lawyers Guild
- Shahla Sherkat (born 1956), writer, publisher, editor; a pioneer of the women's movement in modern Iran
- Nasrin Sotoudeh (born 1963), human rights lawyer for opposition activists, women protesting mandatory hijab laws, juveniles facing the death penalty, and politicians; imprisoned multiple times in Evin Prison and Qarchak Prison, served a 3-year term, was re-arrested to serve an accumulated 38-year sentence.
- Iran Teymourtash (1914–1991), journalist and early activist; daughter of Abdolhossein Teymourtash; moved to France
- Elham Youssefian (born c. 1980/81), Iranian-American human rights lawyer and disability rights advocate

== Prisoners and detainees ==
- Zahra Bani Ameri (1980–2007), physician, died in a prison in Hamedan after being arrested for breaching modesty laws by sitting in a park with her fiancée.
- Mahsa Amini (1999–2022), was arrested by the Guidance Patrol for allegedly not wearing the hijab in accordance with government standards, and died in police custody in Vozara Detention Center amid assertions of police brutality
- Marziyeh Amirizadeh (born 1979), Iranian-American author imprisoned in Evin Prison and sentenced to execution by hanging for converting to Christianity; later tortured, and released after 259 days.
- Zahra Bahrami (1965–2011), dual Dutch and Iranian citizen arrested during a political protest, imprisoned in Evin Prison, and later convicted for drug trafficking and executed by hanging
- Zahra Amir Ebrahimi (born 1981), photographer, television actress, subject of a 2006 sex tape scandal in Iran
- Nasser Fahimi, a doctor from Kurdistan, a political and ideological prisoner
- Zeynab Jalaliyan (born 1982), Kurdish prisoner, initially sentenced to death for "enmity against God" (moharebeh) due to alleged political alignment with Kurdish groups, held in Yazd Central Prison since 2008
- Zahra Kazemi, Iranian-Canadian freelance photographer, who according to the medical examiner was raped, tortured and killed by Iranian officials following her arrest in Iran.
- Sharifeh Mohammadi (born 1979), social activist and political prisoner sentenced to death, held in Lakan Prison
- Verisheh Moradi (born c. 1985/86), political prisoner and women's rights activist sentenced to death and imprisoned in Sanandaj Prison and Evin Prison since 2023
- Taraneh Mousavi (1981–2009), arrested for protesting the 2009 election results, died after being sexually abused while in custody
- Hossein Rajabian, imprisoned filmmaker
- Mehdi Rajabian, imprisoned musician
- Zahra Tabari (born c. 1958), electrical engineer and activist sentenced to death by hanging on charges of "armed rebellion" after she was found to possess a cloth printed with the "Woman, Life, Freedom" slogan, held in Lakan Prison since 2025

== Literature figures ==
=== Authors and poets ===
- See main list: List of Persian-language poets and authors
- Adam Khaze, author, researcher
- Jamshid Behnam, author
- Allameh Dehkhoda, author
- Mahyar Amouzegar, Iranian-American author, academic
- Badiozzaman Forouzanfar, author
- Mohammad-Taqi Bahar, author
- Parviz Natel-Khanlari, author
- Sadeq Hedayat, author
- Shahrokh Meskoob, author
- Saeed Shamloo, academic, author
- Ali Abdolrezaei, Iranian-British author
- Parirokh Dadsetan, academic, author
- Abdolhossein Zarrinkoub, author
- Haraton Davidian, academic, author
- Levon Davidian, academic, author
- Heidarali Hooman, academic, author
- Saeed Nafisi, author
- Hassan Kamshad, academic, author
- Aliakbar ShoariNezhad, academic, author
- Abbas Shafiee, academic, author
- Mohammad Moin, author
- Alireza Norouzi, academic, author
- Ahmad Kasravi, author
- Karim Emami, author
- Mohammad-Ali Jamalzadeh
- Sadeq Hedayat
- Nazi Safavi
- Mahmoud Mansour, academic, author
- Shahriyar Mandanipour, writer, journalist and literary theorist
- Hamzeh Ganji, academic, author
- Reza Ghassemi ,novelist, composer, and setar player
- Zoya Pirzad, writer and novelist
- Mahmoud Golzari, academic, author
- Behrooz Birashk, academic, author
- Mahmoud Dowlatabadi, writer and actor
- Shiva Dolatabadi, academic, author
- Hamideh Jahangiri, academic, author
- Bahman Forsi
- Reza Zamani, academic, author
- Houshang Golshiri
- Reza Baraheni
- Abbasgholi Daneshvar, academic, author
- Abbas Maroufi
- Bozorg Alavi
- Ahmad Siadati, academic, author
- Majid M. Naini, author
- Bahram Sadeghi
- Gholam-Hossein Sa'edi
- Ghazaleh Alizadeh
- Ahmad Mahmoud
- Jalal Al-e-Ahmad
- Kazem Amoli, academic, author
- Javad Nurbakhsh, academic, author
- Simin Daneshvar, academic, novelist, fiction writer, and translator.
- Ebrahim Golestan
- Bahman Sholevar, Iranian-American novelist, poet, translator, critic, psychiatrist and political activist
- Sadeq Chubak, author of short fiction, drama, and novels
- Karim Haddadian, academic, author
- Mahnaz Afkhami (born 1941), writer, politician, women's rights activist
- Mana Aghaee (born 1973), Iranian-Swedish poet, translator, and bibliographer
- Mina Assadi (born 1943), Iranian-Swedish poet and author; winner of the Hellman/Hammett award from Human Rights Watch in 1996
- Camila Batmanghelidjh (1963–2024), Iranian-Belgian psychotherapist, author
- Najmieh Batmanglij (1947), Iranian-American cookbook author
- Simin Behbahani (1927–2014), poet, 1997 Nobel Prize nominee
- Sahar Delijani (born 1983), Iranian-American widely translated novelist; author of Children of the Jacaranda Tree; living between the United States and Italy
- Forough Farrokhzad (1934–1967), modernist poet and film director
- Rabe'e Ghazdari, poet, 10th century
- Roya Hakakian (born 1966), Iranian-American writer, journalist, and poet
- Porochista Khakpour (born 1978), Iranian-American novelist
- Mahsati (c. 1089–1159), medieval poet
- Leandra Medine (born 1988), American author, blogger, and humor writer best known for Man Repeller
- Azadeh Moaveni (born 1976), Iranian-American writer and journalist
- Azar Nafisi (born 1948), Iranian-American writer, Reading Lolita in Tehran
- Shahrnush Parsipur (born 1946), novelist
- Homa Sarshar (born 1946), Iranian-American author, activist, media personality, and award-winning journalist
- Marjane Satrapi (1969–2026), French-Iranian graphic novelist of Persepolis, Embroideries and Chicken with Plums
- Esther Shkalim (born1954), Israeli, Mizrahi feminist poet
- Dalia Sofer (born 1972), Iranian-born American writer
- Badri Tarvij (1932–2017), poet
- Tahereh Qorrat Al-'Ayn (c.1814–1852), poet, philosopher and theologist; seventeenth disciple or Letter of the Living of the Báb (mid-19th century)

=== Translators ===
- Abdolmajid Eskandari, academic and translator
- Ali Akbar Abdolrashidi, author and translator
- Saeed Shamloo, academic, author and translator
- Parirokh Dadsetan, academic, author and translator
- Haraton Davidian, academic, author and translator
- Levon Davidian, academic, author and translator
- Heidarali Hooman, academic, author and translator
- Aliakbar ShoariNezhad, academic, author and translator
- Mahshid Amirshahi (born 1937), novelist, humorist, and translator
- Abbas Shafiee, academic, author and translator
- Karim Emami, author and translator
- Mahmoud Mansour, academic, author and translator
- Mohammad Ghazi, translator andwriter
- Hamzeh Ganji, academic, author and translator
- Mahmoud Golzari, academic, author and translator
- Behrooz Birashk, academic, author and translator
- Shiva Dolatabadi, academic, author and translator
- Reza Zamani, academic, author and translator
- Abbasgholi Daneshvar, academic, author and translator
- Alireza. Norouzi, academic, author and translator
- Ahmad Siadati, academic, author and translator
- Majid M. Naini, author and translator
- Kazem Amoli, academic, author and translator
- Javad Nurbakhsh, academic, author and translator
- Aliakbar Seif, academic, author and translator
- Karim Haddadian, author and translator
- Shahrokh Meskoob, author, literary historian, and translator

== Religious figures ==
- Majlesi
- The Báb, Prophet-Founder of the Bábi Faith
- Bahá'u'lláh, Prophet-Founder of the Bahá'í Faith
- 'Abdu'l-Bahá, Centre of the Covenant of the Bahá'í Faith
- Ganzibra Jabbar Choheili (1923–2014), head of the Mandaean community in Iran until his death in 2014.
- Rishama Salah Choheili, Iranian Mandaean who is the current patriarch and head of the Mandaean community in Australia
- Haik Hovsepian Mehr, bishop and Christian martyr
- Jamal al-Din Asadabadi
- Mani, founder of Manichaeism
- Mazdak, Religious and Social Reformer
- Meher Baba, Indian spiritual master born to Iranian immigrant parents
- Hamza ibn-'Ali ibn-Ahmad, founder of the Druze
- Muhammad ibn Ismail ad-Darazi
- Mulla Sadra
- Saeed Abedini, Iranian American Christian pastor
- Safi-ad-din Ardabili
- Salman the Persian
- Zahed Gilani
- Zayn al-Din Taybadi (died 1389) mystic and Sufi
- Zoroaster, prophet
- Imam Tawhidi, Australian Imam of Arabian and Iranian descent
- Mullah Taha, An Iranian gay Shia cleric

=== Contemporary Shia Clergy ===
- Abbas Ali Akhtari
- Abbas-Ali Amid Zanjani
- Abbas Ali Karamatlu
- Abbas Ali Rostami Sani
- Abbas-Ali Soleimani
- Abbas Amirifar
- Abbas Hosseini Kashani
- Abbas Ka'bi
- Abbas Mahfouzi
- Abbas Matin
- Abbas Almohri
- Mohammad Montazeri
- Abbas Mousaviyan
- Abbas Tabrizian
- Abbas Vaez-Tabasi
- Abdul Fattah Nawab
- Abdul Hadi Hussayni Shahroudi
- Abdul Hamid Khodri
- Abdol-Hamid Masoumi-Tehrani
- Abdol Hossein Dastgheib
- Abdul Hussein Mo'ezzi
- Abdol Javad Alamolhoda
- Abdul Javad Ibrahimi Far
- Abdul Karim Abidini
- Abdul Karim Farhani
- Abdolkarim Hasheminejad
- Abdul Karim Haghshenas
- Abdul-Karim Mousavi Ardebili
- Seyyed Abdollah Fateminia
- Abdullah Haji Sadiqi
- Abdullah Hajiani
- Abdullah Hussayni
- Abdullah Keyvani Hafshejani
- Abd al-A'la al-Sabziwari
- Abdollah Javadi-Amoli
- Abdullah Musawi Shirazi
- Abdollah Nouri
- Abdul Mahmoud Abdullahi
- Abdul-Majid al-Khoei
- Abdul Mohammad Rastad
- Abdolmoghim Nasehi
- Abdul-Nabi Mousavi Fard
- Abdul-Nabi Namazi
- Abd al-Rahim Aqiqi Bakhshayishi
- Ayatollah Abdul Rahman Heidari Ilami
- Abdul Rasoul Mousavi
- Abdul Reza Pourzahabi
- Abdolvahed Mousavi Lari
- Abu al-Fazl Mir Mohammedi
- Seyed Abolfazl Mousavi Tabrizi
- Abu al-Fazl Razavi Ardakani
- Abu al-Hassan Hassanzadeh
- Abulhassan Navab
- Abolghasem Khazali
- Abu al-Qasem
- Abu al-Qasim al-Khoei
- Abolghasem Wafi Yazdi
- Abu al-Qasim Yaqoubi
- Ahad Azadikhah
- Ahmad Alamolhoda
- Ahmad Azari Qomi
- Ahmad Beheshti
- Ahmad Daneshzadeh Mo’min
- Ahmad Hemmati Meshgini
- Ahmad Hussayn Fallahi
- Ahmad Hosseini Khorasani
- Ahmad Jannati
- Ahmad Khatami
- Ahmad Khomeini
- Ahmad Khonsari
- Ahmad Marvi
- Ahmad Mazani
- Ahmad Moballeghi
- Ahmad Mohseni Garakani
- Ahmad Mojtahedi Tehrani
- Ahmad Motahari Asl
- Sayyid Ahmad Mousavi
- Ahmad Parvai'i Rik
- Ahmad Ghabel
- Mir Ahmad Reza Hajati
- Seyyed Ahmad Reza Shahrokhi
- Ahmad Sabiri Hamedani
- Ahmad Salek
- Ahmad Sheikh Baha’i
- Ahmad Vaezi
- Akbar Ahmadpour
- Akbar Ghaffari Qarabagh
- Akbar Hashemi Rafsanjani
- Allah Nour Karimi Tabar
- Ali Abbasi (Cleric)
- Ali Ahmadi Mianji
- Ali Akbar al-Modarresi
- Ali Meshkini
- Ali-Akbar Hosseini
- Ali Akbar Masoudi Khomeini
- Ali Akbar Mohtashamipur
- Ali Akbar Kalantari
- Ali Akbar Ghoreishi
- Ali Akbar Hamidzadeh
- Ali Akbar Mousavi Hussayni
- Ali Akbar Nasseri
- Ali Akbar Nategh-Nouri
- Ali Akbar Rashad
- Ali al-Sabziwari
- Ali Asghar Baghani
- Seyed Ali Asghar Dastgheib
- Ali Asghar Hussayni
- Ali Asghar Masoumi Shahroudi
- Ali Asghar Rahimi Azad
- Ali Asghar Rahmani Khalili
- Ali Banaei
- Ali Fallahian
- Ali Davani
- Ali Gharavi
- Ali Ghiouri
- Ali Golzadeh Ghafouri
- Ali Hussayni Ashkevari
- Ali al-Sistani
- Ali Islami
- Ali Kazemi Gilani
- Ali al-Kazemi Momendi
- Ali Khamenei
- Ali Khatami (Zanjan)
- Ali Mirkhalili
- Ali Mo’alemi
- Ali Mohammad Bozorgvari
- Ali Mohammad Dastgheib Shirazi
- Ali Momenpour
- Ali Nazari Monfard
- Ali Orumian
- Ali Qazi Askar
- Ali Qoddusi
- Ali Razini
- Ali Reza Afqahi
- Alireza Arafi
- Ali Reza Dana
- Ali Reza Ebadi
- Ali Reza Islamian
- Alireza Panahian
- Alireza Qaeminia
- Alireza Salimi (politician)
- Ali Safi Golpaygani
- Seyyed Ali Shafiei
- Sheikh Ali Shahrokhi
- Ali Shirazi
- Ali Tahiri Gorgani
- Ali Zadsar Jirofti
- Amanallah Alimoradi
- Aman Narimani
- Amir Qoli Jafari Borujeni
- Amir Reza Heda’i
- Asadollah Bayat-Zanjani
- Assad-Allah Imani
- Asadallah Kian-Arasi
- Mir Asadollah Madani
- Asgar Dirbaz
- Ataollah Ashrafi Esfahani
- Azizollah Khoshvaght
- Baqir Seyyedi Bonabi
- Dakhil Abbas Zarazadeh Mehrizi
- Davoud Samadi Amoli
- Fakhraddin Hashemi
- Fakhreddin Mousavi
- Fakhraddin Sabiri
- Fathallah Omid Najafabadi
- Ghiyasaddin Taha Mohammedi
- Gholam Ali Naim Abadi
- Gholam Ali Safai Bushehri
- Mohammad Mohammadi Golpayegani
- Gholam-Hossein Mohseni-Eje'i
- Gholam Hussayn Nadi
- Gholam Reza Fayazi
- Gholamreza Hassani
- Gholamreza Mesbahi Moghaddam
- Gholam Reza Moghiseh
- Gholamreza Rezvani
- Gholam Reza Sultani
- Habibollah Ashouri
- Habiballah Ghafouri Barjini
- Habiballah Mehman Navaz
- Habiballah Sha’bani Movasaqi
- Habib Boromand Dashghapu
- Hadi al-Modarresi
- Hadi Barikbin
- Hadi Doust Mohammadi
- Hadi Ghaffari
- Hadi Khamenei
- Hadi Khosroshahi
- Hadi Ghabel
- Hadi Rohani
- Hamid Rasai
- Hamid Shahriari
- Mirza Hashem Amoli
- Hashem Bathaie Golpayegani
- Hashem Hamidi
- Hashem Hashemzadeh Herisi
- Hashem Hejazifar
- Hashem Hosseini Bushehri
- Hashem Niazi
- Hassan Abtahi
- Hassan Alemi
- Hassan Ali Akhlaqi Amiri
- Hassan Alidadi Sulaymani
- Hasanali Morvarid
- Hasan Ali Nejabat Shirazi
- Hassan Ameli
- Hassan Aqa Hussayni Tabataba’i
- Hassan Emami
- Hassan Hassanzadeh Amoli
- Hassan Eslami Ardakani
- Hassan Khomeini
- Hassan Malek Mohammadi
- Hassan Mamduhi
- Hassan Namazi
- Hassan Nowrouzi
- Hassan Rouhani
- Hassan Sanei
- Hassan Shariati Niyasar
- Hassan Shahcheraghi
- Hassan Shuja’i Aliabadi
- Hassan Shuja’i Kiyasari
- Hassan Tabatabaei Qomi
- Hassan Taheri Khorramabadi
- Heydar Moslehi
- Hussein-Ali Montazeri
- Hussayn Ali Sa'adi
- Hossein Borujerdi
- Hossein Ansarian
- Hussayn Ansari Rad
- Hossein Ayatollahi
- Hussayn Hashemian
- Hussayn Irani
- Hussayn Jalali
- Hossein Kazemeyni Boroujerdi
- Hossein Lankarani
- Hossein Mazaheri
- Hussayn Mirza'i
- Hossein Mousavi Tabrizi
- Hussayn Muzzafari
- Hossein Noori Hamedani
- Hussayn Rafia’i
- Hussayn Rasti Kashani
- Hussayn Sobhani Nia
- Hossein Taeb
- Hossein Wahid Khorasani
- Ebrahim Amini
- Mir Ebrahim Seyyed Hatami
- Ebrahim Raisi
- Isa Tarafi
- Ismail Ferdowsipour
- Esmaeil Khatib
- Seyed Esmaeil Mousavi Zanjani
- Ismail Salehi Mazandarani
- Jafar Karimi Divkola'i
- Jafar Sobhani
- Jafar Shojouni
- Jalaladdin Faqih Imani
- Jalaleddin Taheri
- Jalal Yahyazadeh Firouzabadi
- Jalil Mohebi
- Javad Alavi Boroujerdi
- Javad Gharavi Aliari
- Javad Hajizadeh Kalajahi
- Javad Hussayni Kia
- Javad Jafari
- Javad Khamenei
- Jawad Tabrizi
- Javad Marvi
- Javad Mojtahed Shabestari
- Javad Nikbin
- Kamel Khairkhah
- Karamatallah Emadi
- Karamatollah Malek-Hosseini
- Khalil Boyukzadeh
- Khalil Mobasher Kashani
- Seyed Kazem Seyed Bagheri
- Kazem Mousavi
- Kazem Nourmofidi
- Kazem Seddiqi
- Lotfollah Dezhkam
- Lotfollah Safi Golpaygani
- Mahmoud Taleghani
- Mahmoud Alavi
- Mahmoud Da’ai
- Mahmoud Hashemi Shahroudi
- Mahmoud Hussayni Dowlatabadi
- Mahmoud Madani Bajestani
- Mahmoud Mar'ashi Najafi
- Mahmoud Mohammedi Araqi
- Mahmoud Nabavian
- Mahmoud Nourizadeh
- Mahmoud Rajabi
- Mahmoud Salavati
- Mahdi al-Modarresi
- Mahdi Baqiri
- Mahdi Hosseini Rohani
- Mehdi Karroubi
- Mahdi Mousavinejad
- Seyed Mehdi Ghoreishi
- Mehdi Shabzendedar Jahromi
- Mahdi Sheikh
- Mahdi Yasrebi Kashani
- Majdaddin Ghazi Dezfuli
- Majid Ansari
- Majid Nasserinejhad
- Majid Nasira'i
- Majid Talkhabi
- Mansour Leghaei
- Masoud Khamenei
- Ali Younesi
- Mohammad Aba’i Khorasani
- Mohammad-Ali Abtahi
- Mohammad Ali Ale-Hashem
- Mohammad Ali "Mokhtar" Aminian
- Mohammad-Ali Angaji
- Mohammad Ali Araki
- Mohammad Ali Ayazi
- Mohammad Ali Faiz Lahijani Gilani
- Mohammad Ali Gerami Qomi
- Mohammad Ali Hadi Najafabadi
- Mohammad Alavi Gorgani
- Mohammad Ali Esmaeelpoor Ghomsheie
- Mohammad Ali Naseri
- Mohammad Ali Nekounam
- Mohammad Ali Modarresi Tabataba’i
- Mohammad Ali Mousavi
- Mohammad Ali Mousavi Jazayeri
- Mohammad Ali Movahed Abtahi
- Ali Movahedi-Kermani
- Mohammad Ali Qazi Tabatabaei
- Mohammad-Ali Rahmani
- Mohammad Ali Reza'i
- Mohammad Ali Sadouqi
- Mohammad-Ali Shahidi
- Mohammad Ali Shar’ai
- Mohammad Ali Shomali
- Mohammad-Ali Taskhiri
- Mohammad Ali Zam
- Mohammad Amin Khorasani
- Mirza Mohammad Anvari
- Mohammad Ashrafi Isfahani Khozani
- Mohammed Bahrami Khoshkar
- Mohammad-Bagher Bagheri
- Mohammad Baqir Ebadi
- Mohammad Bagher Kharazi
- Mohammad Baqir Mohammadi La’ini
- Mohammad Baqir Movahed Abtahi
- Mohammad Ebadizadeh
- Mohammed Emami-Kashani
- Mohammad Faqih
- Mohammad Fazel Lankarani
- Mohammad Feyz Sarabi
- Mohammad Hadi Abdekhodai
- Mohammad Hadi Ghazanfari Khansari
- Mohammad-Hadi Ma'refat
- Mohammad Hadi Mofatteh
- Mohammad Hadi Rabbani
- Mohammad Haji Abu al-Qasem Doulabi
- Mohammad Hashemian
- Mohammad-Hassan Aboutorabi Fard
- Mohammad Hassan Ahmadi Faqih
- Mohammad Hassan Jamshidi Ardeshiri
- Mohammad Hassan Mar’ashi
- Mohammad Hassan Nabavi
- Mohammad Hassan Ghadrdan Gharamaleki
- Mohammad Hassan Rahimian
- Mohammad Hassan Zali
- Mohammad Hussayn Ahmadi Shahroudi
- Mohammad Beheshti
- Mohammad Hussayn Bayati
- Mohammad Hussayn Hussaynzadeh Bahraini
- Mohammad Hussayni Rouhani Qomi
- Mohammad Hussaini Shahroudi
- Mohammad Hussayni Shahroudi
- Seyyed Mohammad Hosseini Zanjani
- Muhammad Husayn Tabatabai
- Mohammad Hussayn Zarandi
- Mohammad Ebrahim Jannaati
- Mohammad Ibrahim Nekounam
- Mohammad Ismail Shushtri
- Mohammad Ezodin Hosseini Zanjani
- Mohammad Jafari Gilani
- Mohammad Jafar Montazeri
- Muhammad Jafar Moravej
- Mohammad Jafar Sadat Mousavi
- Muhammad Javad Haj Ali Akbari
- Mohammad-Javad Bahonar
- Mohammad Javad Pishvai
- Mohammad Karim Marouji
- Mohammed Kadhim al-Modarresi
- Mohammad Kazim Movahedi Azad
- Mohammad Kazem Shariatmadari
- Mohammad Khamenei
- Mohammad Khatami
- Mohammad Mahdi Aftakhari
- Mohammad Mahdi Hussayni Hamedani
- Mohammad Mahdi Mir Baqeri
- Mohammad Mahdi Pourfatimi
- Mohammad Mahdi Rabbani Amlishi
- Mohammad Mahdi Shahrokhi
- Mehdi Tabatabaei
- Mohammad Mofatteh
- Mohammad Mo’adebpour
- Mohammad Mohad
- Mohammad Mohammadi Gilani
- Mohammad Momen
- Mohammad Mousavi Khoeiniha
- Mohammad Mofti al-shia Mousavi
- Mohammad Mojtahed Shabestari
- Mohammad Naqi Lotfi
- Mohammad Naqi Shahrokhi Khorramabadi
- Nasser Biria
- Mohammad Qomi
- Mohammad Rahmati Sirjani
- Mohammad Rajaei Baghsiai
- Mohammad Reyshahri
- Mohammad Razavi Yazdi
- Mohammad Reza Abbasi Fard
- Mohammad Reza Amiri Kohnuj
- Mohammad-Reza Ashtiani Araghi
- Mohammad Reza Baqiri Bonabi
- Mohammad Reza Dowlatabadi
- Mohammad Reza Faker
- Mohammad-Reza Golpaygani
- Mohammad-Reza Mahdavi Kani
- Mohammad Reza Meghari Moruji
- Mohammad Reza Mirtajodini
- Mohammad-Reza Modarresi Yazdi
- Mohammad Reza Naseri Yazdi
- Mohammad Reza Nekoonam
- Mohammed Ridha al-Sistani
- Mohammad-Reza Tavassoli
- Mohammad Reza Za’iri
- Mohammad Rouhani Qomi
- Mohammad Sabzi
- Mohammad Sadat Ibrahimi
- Mohammad Sa’id Mahdavi Kani
- Mohammad Sadiq "Mohiaddin" Haeri Shirazi
- Sadegh Khalkhali
- Mohammad Sadeq Rouhani
- Mohammad-Sadegh Salehimanesh
- Mohammad Sadeqi Tehrani
- Mohammad Sadoughi
- Seyyed Mohammad Saeedi
- Mohammad Safari Molkmian
- Mohammad Shahcheraghi
- Mohammad Shahi Arablu
- Mohammad-Taher Shubayr al-Khaqani
- Mohammad Taqi al-Modarresi
- Mohammad Taqi al-Khoei
- Mohammad-Taqi Bahjat Foumani
- Mohammad Taghi Falsafi
- Mohammad-Taqi Ja'fari
- Mohammad-Taghi Khalaji
- Mohammad-Taqi Mesbah-Yazdi
- Mohammad Taqi Mohassil Hamadani
- Mohammed Taqi Morvarid
- Mohammad Taqi Naqd Ali
- Mohammad Taghi Pourmohammadi
- Mohammad Taqi Rahbar
- Mohammad-Taqi Shoushtari
- Mohammad Taghi Vaezi
- Mohammad Waezzadeh Khorasani
- Mohammad Vaez Mousavi
- Mohammad Yasrebi
- Mohammad Yazdi
- Seyyed Mohammad Ziaabadi
- Mohiaddin Fazl Harandi
- Mohsen Araki
- Mohsen Faqihi
- Mohsen Heidari Alekasir
- Mohsen Ibrahimi
- Mohsen Kazeroni
- Mohsen Kharazi
- Mohsen Koochebaghi Tabrizi
- Mohsen Mojtahed Shabestari
- Mohsin Qara'ati
- Mohsen Qomi
- Mohsen Rohami
- Mohsen Sa'idi Golpaygani
- Mohsen Tahiri
- Seyed Mojtaba Hosseini
- Mojtaba Mo’adpour
- Mujtaba Musavi Lari
- Mojtaba Tehrani
- Mojtaba Zonnour
- Mokhtar Waziri
- Morteza Aghatehrani
- Morteza Fahim Kermani
- Morteza Mahmoudi Golpayegani
- Morteza Mati’ayi
- Morteza Moghtadai
- Morteza Motahhari
- Morteza Mousavi
- Morteza Razavi
- Morteza Sadouqi Mazandarani
- Morteza Salehi Khvansari
- Mousa Ahmadi
- Mousa Ghazanfarabadi
- Mousa Mousavi
- Mousa Mousavi Qahdarijani
- Mousa Qorbani
- Mousa Shubairi Zanjani
- Mostafa Boroujerdi
- Mustafa Fargh Dezfuli
- Mustafa Hassanti
- Mostafa Khamenei
- Mostafa Khomeini
- Mustafa Mohami
- Mostafa Mohaghegh Damad
- Mostafa Mousavi Faraz
- Mostafa Pourmohammadi
- Mustafa Tabataba’inejhad
- Mustafa Ulama
- Mustafa Zu al-Qadir
- Moslem Malakouti
- Motahar Kazimi
- Nasir Hosseini
- Nasrollah Pejmanfar
- Nasrallah Shah-Abadi
- Naser Makarem Shirazi
- Seyed Naser Mousavi Largani
- Nasser Mousavi
- Nasser Qawami
- Nematollah Salehi Najafabadi
- Nourallah Tabresi
- Qasem Ravanbakhsh
- Mir Ghesmat Mosavi Asl
- Ghodratollah Alikhani
- Qodratallah Najafi
- Qodratallah Nazari Nia
- Ghorbanali Dorri-Najafabadi
- Qorban Ali Qandahari
- Rahim Tavakol
- Rasoul Fallahati Gilani
- Rasul Jafarian
- Rasoul Montajabnia
- Reza Akrami
- Seyed Reza Bahaadini
- Reza Hosseini Nassab
- Reza Mohammadi Langroudi
- Reza Nouri
- Reza Ostadi
- Reza Ramezani Gilani
- Reza Taqvi
- Ruhollah Beigi
- Ruhollah Hosseinian
- Ruhollah Khatami
- Ruhollah Khomeini
- Ruhallah Sadr al-Sadati
- Sabir Jabbari
- Sadeq Larijani
- Sadiq Pishnamazi
- Sadiq Tabataba’inejhad
- Saied Reza Ameli
- Sa’id Saleh Mirza’i
- Seyed Sajjad Izdehi
- Salman Zakir
- Shahab al-Din Ishraqi
- Shahab ud-Din Mar'ashi Najafi
- Shahab Moradi
- Shams al-Din Mohammad Mujatahidi Najafi
- Sharaf al-Din Malek Hussayni
- Sirajaddin Mousavi
- Taha Hashemi
- Taher Ahmadzadeh
- Taqi Tabatabaei Qomi
- Teymour Ali Asgari
- Wahid Ahmadi
- Vaed Moradbeygi
- Yadollah Duzduzani
- Yadallah Safari
- Yahya Ansari Shirazi
- Yahya Nouri
- Yasubedin Rastegar Jooybari
- Younis Mousavi Sarcheshmeh
- Yousef Madani Tabrizi
- Yousef Saanei
- Yousef Tabatabai Nejad
- Zakrallah Ahmadi
- Zaynolabideen Ghorbani

=== Contemporary Sunni Clergy ===
- Abdolhamid Ismaeelzahi
- Abdolqader Zahedi
- Abdul Rahman Arefi
- Abdul Rahman Khoda'i
- Abdul Rahman Mullazahi
- Ali Ahmad Salami
- Burhan Ealla
- Faiq Rostami
- Hosamaddin Mujtahidi
- Iqbal Bahmani
- Kamal Akhund Gharavi
- Mohammad Ishaq Madani
- Mohmmad Sheikh al-Islami

== Scientists, scholars, and academics ==
=== Explorers and travellers ===
- Ahmad ibn Rustah, 10th-century Persian explorer of Russia, Scandinavia and Arabia

=== Historians, archaeologists and Iranologists ===
- Abbas Alizadeh
- Abbas Amanat
- Abdolhossein Zarinkoob
- Ahmad Kasravi
- Alireza Shapour Shahbazi
- Badiozzaman Forouzanfar
- Iraj Bashiri
- Ezzatolah Neghban
- Fereydun Adamiyat
- Habiballah Esmaili
- Hamdallah Mustawfi
- Kaveh Farrokh
- Majid Adibzadeh
- Mehrdad Bahar
- Mohammad Ali Eslami Nodooshan
- Nasser Fakouhi
- Sadegh Malek Shahmirzadi
- Touraj Atabaki
- Touraj Daryaee
- Jaleh Amouzgar (born 1939), Iranologist, professor and chair at University of Tehran
- Farideh Heyat (born 1949), British-Iranian anthropologist and writer; retired lecturer of SOAS, University of London and American University of Central Asia
- Firoozeh Kashani-Sabet (born 1967), American-Iranian Professor of History at the University of Pennsylvania; novelist
- Amy Malek (born c. 1979/1980), Iranian-American scholar, and sociocultural anthropologist at Oklahoma State University, Stillwater
- Afsaneh Najmabadi (born 1946), Iranian-born American Professor of History and of Studies of Women, Gender, and Sexuality at Harvard University

=== Linguists ===
- Ahmad Karimi-Hakkak
- Ahmad Tafazzoli
- Ali Akbar Abdolrashidi
- Ehsan Yarshater
- Jaleh Amouzgar
- Mehrdad Bahar
- Parviz Natel-Khanlari
- Zabihollah Safa

=== Intellectuals and philosophers ===
- See main list: List of pre-modern Iranian scientists and scholars
- See main list: List of contemporary Iranian scientists, scholars, and engineers
- Mirza Fath Ali Akhundzadeh
- Mohammad-Ali Foroughi
- Mostafa Malekian
- Mirza Malkam Khan
- Abbas Milani
- Mohammad Mojtahed Shabestari
- Seyyed Hossein Nasr
- Ali Shariati
- Sadegh Zibakalam
- Ali Abdolrezaei

=== Technology and computer engineering ===
- Shahram Dabiri, lead producer responsible for the massively multiplayer online role-playing game (MMORPG) World of Warcraft
- Dara Khosrowshahi, Iranian and American CEO of Uber, former CEO of Expedia
- Amir Taaki, British-Iranian hacker, computer programmer and early developer for Bitcoin
- Pierre Omidyar, Iranian-American founder of eBay
- Rouzbeh Yassini, American early cable internet innovator.
- Habib Zargarpour, American visual effects specialist, video game art director
- Azita Emami, Iranian-American engineer working on low-power mixed-mode circuits in scalable technologies; Professor of Electrical Engineering and Medical Engineering at California Institute of Technology
- Mahta Moghaddam (born 1965), Iranian-American William M. Hogue Professor of Electrical Engineering in the Department of Electrical and Computer Engineering at the University of Southern California
- Reihaneh Safavi-Naini, Iranian-Canadian cryptographer; professor of computer science; head of the Telecommunications and Information Technology Research Institute at the University of Wollongong
- Kiarash Vosough, Iranian-Canadian sheet metal estimator at HTS Engineering Ltd. Delivering Real Success.

== Sports ==
- Mojtaba Abedini (born 1984), Olympic fencer
- Yu Darvish, Japanese MLB baseball player for the Texas Rangers
- Ariajasuru Hasegawa, Japanese professional footballer, attacking midfielder for Nagoya Grampus
- Ali Azari Karki, footballer
- Sardar Azmoun, soccer player, Iran's National Team player
- Farhad Ghaemi, volleyball player, Iran's National Team player
- Abbas Jadidi, wrestler, Olympic silver medalist
- Abdollah Movahed, wrestler, Olympic gold medalist
- Adel Kolahkaj, football player
- Alex Agase, American NFL American football player
- Ali Daei, football player, top international goalscorer, world record holder
- Ali Karimi (footballer, born 1978)
- Ali Karimi (footballer, born 1982)
- Ali Karimi (footballer, born 1994)
- Ali Parvin, football player and coach
- Alireza Dabir, wrestler, Olympic gold medalist
- Alireza Heidari, wrestler, Olympic bronze medalist
- Alireza Rezaei, wrestler, Olympic silver medalist
- Taghi Rezaei, bodybuilder
- Amir Abedzadeh, football player
- Amir Reza Khadem, Olympic Bronze Medalist wrestler
- Andre Agassi, American tennis player; his father was Assyrian-Armenian
- Arash Miresmaili, judo world champion
- Aravane Rezaï (born 1987), French–Iranian tennis player
- Behdad Salimi, weightlifter world champion
- Bijan Kangarloo, Canadian-Iranian cross-country skier
- Ebrahim Javadi, wrestler, Olympic bronze medalist
- Ehsan Ghaemmaghami, chess grandmaster
- Ehsan Hadadi, discus thrower, Asian record holder
- Elshan Moradi, Iranian and American chess grandmaster
- Emamali Habibi Goudarzi, wrestler, first Iranian Olympic gold medalist (Melbourne 1956)
- Emmanuel Agassi, Iranian and American boxer at 1948 and 1952 Olympics, father of Andre Agassi
- Ezzatollah Pourghaz, Iranian-Turkmen football player
- George Issabeg, boxer at 1948 and 1952 Olympics
- George Malek-Yonan, Iran's Champion of Champions in track & field and pentathlon
- Ghasem Dehnavi, football player
- Ghasem Hadadifar, football player
- Ghasem Rezaei, wrestler
- Hooman Tavakolian, Iranian-American Sport Diplomat and Lobbyist, Hall of Fame, wrestler
- Hossein Rezazadeh, weightlifter, double Olympic champion (Sydney 2000, Athens 2004)
- Javad Nekounam, football player
- Khodadad Azizi, football player
- Kianoush Rostami, weightlifter, world champion
- Kimia Alizadeh (born 1998), Iranian-born Bulgarian taekwondo athlete, first Iranian female Olympic medalist
- Mahmoud Namjoo, weightlifter, Olympic silver medalist
- Mahyar Monshipour, Iranian-born French World Super Bantamweight boxing champion
- Mansour Bahrami, Iranian-French tennis player
- Mansour Barzegar, wrestler, Olympic silver medalist
- Masoud Jokar, wrestler, Olympic silver medalist
- Mehdi Haghizadeh, football player
- Mehdi Mahdavikia, football player
- Mehdi Taremi, football player
- Mohammad Ali Fardin, wrestler and actor
- Mohammad Khadem, wrestler
- Mohammad Mousavi, volleyball player
- Mohammad Nassiri, weightlifter, Olympic gold medalist
- Mohammad Reza Heidarian, futsal player
- Mohammad Reza Tupchi, wrestler
- Rahman Rezaei, football player
- Ramin Rezaeian, football player
- Rasoul Khadem, Olympic gold medalist wrestler
- Rouzbeh Cheshmi, football player
- Ruhollah Bigdeli, football player
- Shima Mehri, Motorcycle Biker
- Saeid Marouf, volleyball player
- Shadi Paridar, chess Woman Grandmaster
- Shawn Daivari, American professional wrestler
- Shoura Osipov, boxer at 1948 Olympics
- T. J. Houshmandzadeh, American NFL player
- Vahid Hashemian, football player
- Yossef Karami, Taekwondo world champion, Olympic bronze medalist
- Andranik Teymourian, football player
- Fereydoon Zandi, football player
- Gholamreza Takhti, wrestler, Olympic gold medalist
- Hadi Saei, taekwondo world champion, Olympic gold medalist
- Hossein Tavakoli, weightlifter, Olympic gold medalist
- Jaber Rouzbahani, basketball player
- Khosrow Vaziri, Iranian-American professional wrestler
- Leila Vaziri, swimmer, World Champion, world record holder
- Vahid Shamsaei, futsal player, top international futsal goalscorer
- Mika Zibanejad, Swedish ice hockey player for Ottawa Senators of the NHL
- Daniel Rahimi, Swedish ice hockey player for San Jose Sharks of the NHL
- Zabihollah Poursheib, Kurdish Iranian martial artist
- Ali Targholizadeh, football executive
- Marjan Kalhor (born 1988), Iranian-French Olympic alpine skier

== Iranian women ==
See separate articles: Women in Iran and List of Iranian women.

== Military ==
=== Aviation ===
- Abbas Doran, fighter pilot
- Fereidoon Izadseta, Colonel of the Islamic Republic of Iran Air Force
- Houshang Seddigh
- Jalil Zandi, fighter pilot
- Manouchehr Khosrodad, general
- Nader Jahanbani, general, distinguished fighter pilot
- Shapour Azarbarzin, fighter pilot

=== Combat Veterans ===
- Abbas Ka'bi
- Abbas Mohtaj
- Abu al-Fazl Hassan Baygi
- Ahmad Salek
- Ali Asghar Baghani
- Ali Mohammad Bozorgvari
- Alireza Tangsiri
- Bahram Hooshyar
- Bijan Najdi
- Gholam Ali Jafarzadeh
- Hassan Ghazizadeh Hashemi
- Hassan Hassanzadeh Amoli
- Hossein Alaei
- Hossein Lashkari
- Kavous Seyed-Emami
- Kazem Mousavi
- Mehdi Khazali
- Mansour Haghdoust
- Mohammad-Ali Rahmani
- Mohammad Bagher Ghalibaf
- Mohammad Forouzandeh
- Mohammad Hussayn Ahmadi Shahroudi
- Mohammad-Hossein Malekzadegan
- Mohammad Marandi
- Nader Ghazipour
- Nasir Hosseini
- Sabir Jabbari
- Sajjad Kouchaki
- Shahram Rostami

=== Generals ===
- Abdolrahim Mousavi
- Ahmad Kazemi
- Ahmad Meyghani
- Ahmad Reza Pourdastan
- Ali Abdollahi
- Ali Fadavi
- Ali Sayad Shirazi
- Ali Shahbazi
- Ali Shamkhani
- Alireza Afshar
- Alireza Sabahifard
- Amir Ali Hajizadeh
- Ataollah Salehi
- Esmaeil Kousari
- Esmail Qaani
- Farzad Esmaili
- Gholam Ali Rashid
- Gholamhossein Gheybparvar
- Habibollah Sayyari
- Hassan Firouzabadi
- Hossein Dehghan
- Hossein Hassani Sa'di
- Hossein Nejat
- Hossein Salami
- Kioumars Heydari
- Mansour Sattari
- Mohammad Ali Jafari
- Mohammad-Hassan Nami
- Mohammad Hejazi
- Mohammad-Hossein Dadras
- Mohammad Kazimi
- Mohammad Jafar Asadi
- Mohammad Pakpour
- Mohammad Reza Zahedi
- Mohammad Salimi
- Mohsen Rezaee
- Mostafa Izadi
- Nasser Shabani
- Qasem-Ali Zahirnejad
- Qasem Soleimani
- Yahya Rahim Safavi

=== War Martyrs ===
- Abdolbaghi Darvish
- Ahmad Keshvari
- Ahmad Motevasselian
- Ali Eghbali Dogahe
- Hamid Taqavi
- Hassan Abshenasan
- Hasan Aghareb Parast
- Hassan Shateri
- Hossein Hamadani
- Hossein Khalatbari
- Hossein Kharrazi
- Hossein Qajeyi
- Javad Fakoori
- Mehdi Bakeri
- Mehdi Zeinoddin
- Masoud Monfared Niyaki
- Mohammad Ali Allahdadi
- Mohammad Boroujerdi
- Mohammad Hossein Fahmideh
- Mohammad Ebrahim Hemmat
- Mohammad Jamali-Paqaleh
- Mohsen Gheytaslou
- Mohsen Hojaji
- Qodratollah Mansouri
- Valiollah Fallahi

== Misc ==
- Alireza Afzalipour, businessman and philanthropist; founder of Shahid Bahonar University of Kerman
- Alireza Azmandian, self-help motivational speaker
- Ali Dashti, Iranian senator
- Zahra Eshraghi, activist and granddaughter of Ayatollah Khomeini and wife of Mohammad Reza Khatami
- Ramezan Hajjimashhadi, lawyer
- Eiman Jahangir, first Iranian-born man to be an astronaut
- Amin Jazayeri, Iranian Dj and YouTuber in India
- Mehran Karimi Nasseri, Iranian refugee who lived in the departure lounge of Terminal One in Charles de Gaulle Airport for many years.
- Reza Zadeh, American computer scientist and technology executive
- Einat Admony (born 1971), Israeli-American chef, restaurateur, author and television personality
- Shohreh Bayat (born 1987), international chess arbiter for FIDE, awarded an International Women of Courage Award for being a champion for women’s rights, based in England
- Ladan and Laleh Bijani (1974–2003), conjoined twins
- Dorsa Derakhshani (born 1998), Iranian-American chess player and medical student; Woman Grandmaster and International Master, moved to the U.S. after being banned from the Iranian national chess team for not wearing a hijab during a tournament
- Sahar Khodayari (c.1990–2019), attempted to enter a sporting stadium disguised as a man in; she died by suicide
- Sheila Nazarian (born 1989), Iranian-American plastic surgeon and television personality
- Atousa Pourkashiyan (born 1988), Iranian-American chess player; Woman Grandmaster

== Afro-Iranians ==
- Abdolreza Barzegari, footballer
- Abdul Karim Farhani, Iranian Shia Cleric
- Ali Firouzi, footballer and coach
- Mohammad Ali Mousavi Jazayeri, Iranians Shia Cleric (Afro-Ahwazi Arab)
- Mehrab Shahrokhi, footballer
- Shanbehzadeh Ensemble, Iranian folk band
- Dennis Walker, footballer of Afro-Iranian descent, first black player to play for Manchester United

== Iranians of Armenian Descent ==
- Alenush Terian, scientist
- Andranik Eskandarian, footballer
- Andranik Teymourian, footballer
- Andre Agassi, tennis champion
- Arefeh Mansouri, Inventor, Designer
- Arakel of Tabriz, historian
- Armik, flamenco guitarist and composer
- Arsen Minasian, philanthropist, pharmacologist
- Bogdan Saltanov, painter
- Emmanuel Agassi, 1948 and 1952 Olympics boxer representing Iran; father of Andre Agassi
- Gegard Mousasi, MMA fighter
- George Bournoutian, historian
- Haik Hovsepian Mehr, bishop and Christian martyr
- Raffi, prominent writer
- Hayk Bzhishkyan, Soviet military commander
- Hovhannes Masehyan, diplomat and translator
- Hrant Markarian, politician
- Irene Zazians, actress
- Ivan Galamian, violin teacher
- Ivan Lazarevich Lazarev, jeweler
- Khosrow Khan Gorji, influential figure from the Qajar era
- Leon Khachatourian, boxer
- Loris Tjeknavorian, artist
- Marcos Grigorian artist, scholar and actor
- Mirza Malkam Khan, modernist and politician
- Mkhitar Heratsi, physician
- Mushegh Soruri
- Ovannes Ohanian, first Iranian film director
- Robert Beglarian, MP
- Samuel Khachikian, film director
- Sarkis Djanbazian, artist
- Sayat-Nova, poet
- Vartan Gregorian, academic
- Varuzh Karim-Masihi, film editor and director
- Vigen Derderian, singer
- Viguen (see Vigen Derderian)
- Yeprem Khan, revolutionary hero

== Iranians of Assyrian descent ==
- Freydun Atturaya, co-founder of the Assyrian Socialist Party
- George Issabeg, 1948 and 1952 Olympics boxer representing Iran
- George Malek-Yonan, politician and Champion of Champions of Iran
- Issa Benyamin, calligraphist
- Ivan Kakovitch (1933–2006), activist and writer (novel Mount Semele (2001))
- Milton Malek-Yonan, inventor of converted rice
- Paulus Khofri, composer and painter
- Ramona Amiri, Miss Canada 2005
- Shoura Osipov, 1948 Olympics boxer representing Iran
- Shoura Osipov, Olympic boxer
- Mar Youhannan Semaan Issayi, Archbishop of Assyro-Chaldean Metropolitan Tehran

== Emigrants and immigrants ==
=== Americans in Iran ===
- Howard Baskerville, Iran's first American martyr
- Joseph Gallup Cochran, American missionary in Urmia and Seer, translator
- Joseph Plumb Cochran, second-generation American missionary in Urmia and medical doctor; established first Iranian medical college
- Arthur Millspaugh, Treasury General, Persia
- Arthur Upham Pope (1881–1969) and Phyllis Ackerman (1893–1977), Persian culture revivalists, scholars of Persian art and architecture history
- David Stronach
- Elgin Groseclose, Treasury General, Persia
- John Limbert
- Justin Perkins, first American resident of Iran (1835), Presbyterian missionary in Urmia
- Morgan Shuster, Treasury General, Persia
- Richard Nelson Frye (1920–2014), former Harvard University professor, scholar of Persian art history
- Samuel M. Jordan, namesake of Jordan Ave. in Tehran
- William M. Miller

=== Germans in Iran ===
- Annemarie Schimmel, German-born Harvard expert on Iranian literature
- Wilhelm Wassmuss, German diplomat, spy and military hero, Iran, World War I

=== Iranians in America ===
See separate article: List of Iranian Americans.

=== Iranians in Canada ===
See article: Iranian-Canadian

Kiarash Vosough - sheet metal estimator

=== Iranians in Britain ===
List of British Iranians

=== Iranians in Germany ===
Iranians in Germany

=== Iranians in Australia ===
Iranian Australian

=== Iranians in the Netherlands ===
Iranians in the Netherlands

=== Iranians in Finland ===
Iranians in Finland

=== Iranians in Sweden ===
Iranians in Sweden

=== Iranians in Egypt ===
- Tahia Kazem, wife of president Gamal Abdel Nasser; born in Egypt to Iranian parents

=== Iranians in Pakistan ===
- Nusrat Bhutto, Iranian father and mother moved with family to Karachi, British India, before partition; married Zulfikar Ali Bhutto; father of Benazir Bhutto

=== Persian Roman Catholic saints ===
See article List of Persian Roman Catholic saints

== See also ==
- List of Iran-related topics
- List of people by nationality
- Iranian peoples
