= Azadeh =

Azadeh (Persian: آزاده) is a Persian female given name meaning free, free-minded also means someone noble, Persian. People named Azadeh include:

== People ==
- Azadeh Ensha, Iranian-American journalist
- Azadeh Moaveni (born 1976), Iranian-American journalist and writer
- Azadeh Shafiq (1951–2011), Iranian royal and journalist
- Azadeh Shahshahani, Iranian-American human rights attorney

== Fictional characters ==
- Azadeh (Shahnameh), a character in Shahnameh of Ferdowsi
