= Heidar Arfaa =

Iranian government official

Heidar-Ali Arfaa (1919 Shiraz, Iran – 1976 Tehran, Iran) was Conseiller d'État to Shah Mohammad Reza Pahlavi of Iran. His role as the high counsellor was discharged concurrently with a cabinet-level position as Minister of Agriculture, and as the elected Député-Majlis from Fars province (Parliamentary Seatholder).

Senator Arfaa is most notable for authoring legislation of the White Revolution concerning Land Reform, Privatization of Government Enterprises, Women's Suffrage, Nationalization of Forests and Pasturelands, and Profit Sharing for Industrial Workers.

== See also ==
- List of Iranians
