= Shima Mehri =

Iranian female motorcyclist/biker

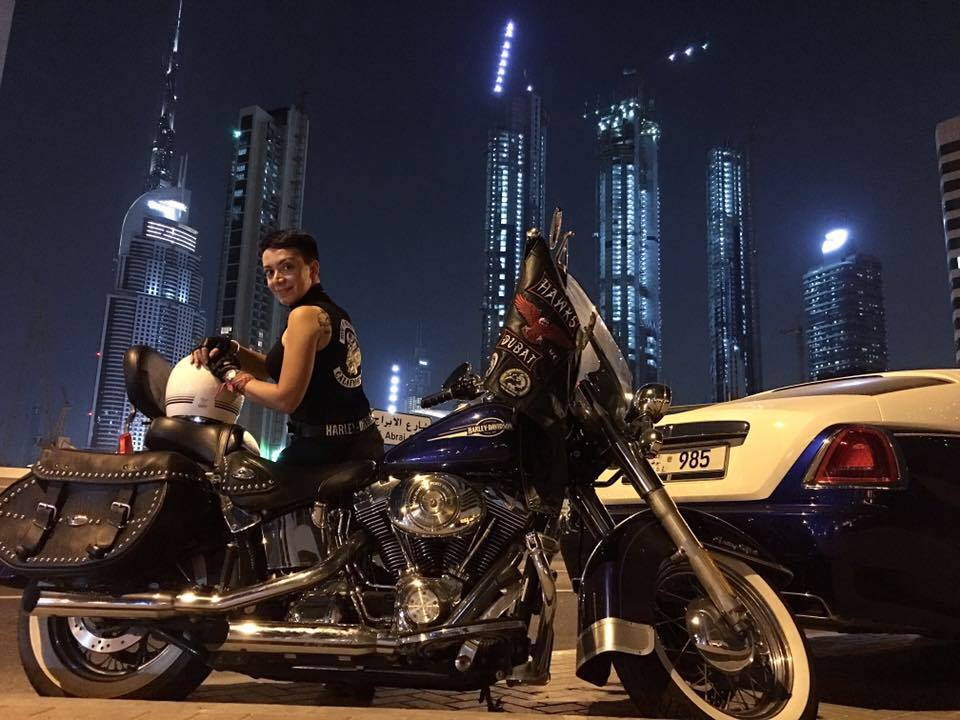
Mehri In Dubai

Shima Mehri (born 1 January 1980 in Tehran) is an Iranian female biker, she lives in Dubai. When she was a child, she lived in Austria until she was 15. Women in Iran are not allowed to ride motorcycles in public. Mehri is the first Iranian girl who has ridden 805 km, in 12 hours non-stop, and 1700 km, 19 hours non-stop. Also she is the first Harley-Davidson Head Road Captain Lady. Mehri is a member of EMSF (Emirates Motor Sport Federation).

== Biography ==
Mehri is the oldest child of her family. When she was a child, she lived in Austria until she was 15. She would watch girls riding motorcycles and dream of one day being able to ride one of her own. She lives in Dubai and rides her Harley-Davidson as a professional biker. She is also working as a television presenter, model, translator, and math teacher.

== Professional activity ==
In 2008 she moved to Dubai. Right after that Mehri got her motorcycle riding license and bought her first bike which was Harley Davidson Sportster 803. In 2012 she had done her first riding Challenge. She road 805 km in 12 hours non-stop, and became the first Lady in the Gulf Cooperation Council (GCC) who did such a challenge. In 2014, she got the title of Road Captain, and became the first lady in GCC to achieve such a title. In 2015 she did her second challenge, 1700 km non-stop ride in 19 hours. On 1 April 2016, she decided to achieve the title of the first lady in the world who has ridden 2500 km non-stop in 24 hours. But unfortunately because of a sandstorm after 1000 km she had a dreadful accident. She got spine fractures, but just after 2 months she started riding again. In May 2016 she became the first lady in the world who became as the Head Road Captain.

== World Riding Tour ==
In 2013, Mehri road in Austria and Hungary, 2000 km in 3 weeks. Also in 2014 she rode the entire Historic Route 66 in 2 weeks.

== See also ==
- List of Iranian women
