= Iman Maghsoudi =

Iranian-American industrial designer

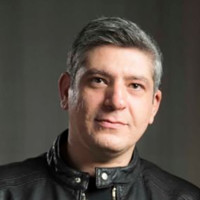
- Born: July 8, 1980 (age 45); Tehran, Iran
- Education: Bachelor of Industrial Design
- Occupation: Industrial designer
- Known for: Car Design, Industrial Design, Luxury Design, Futuristic Design
- Awards: Interior Motives Award Red Dot Awards DURA Award Local Motors Hawaii Motors Design IMTS A' Design Award International Design Awards (IDA) A' Design Award
- Website: www.iman.design

Iman Maghsoudi (Persian: ایمان مقصودی) (born July 8, 1980) is an Iranian-American industrial designer known for his work in car design, luxury products, and futuristic design concepts.

== Early life ==
Born in Tehran, he started experimenting with car design as a student of industrial design in Islamic Azad University and won the "Interior Motives Award in 2006" featuring Ferrari Monza concept, with which he managed to win three prizes: Overall winner, Best Conceptual Interior, and nominated for Best Innovation award. The jury called his design a "dramatic design [that] represents a vision of the future in which the considerations of space and resources will impact on the way people drive." In 2007, He won the Red Dot Awards for "Living Box" in the "Mobility" Category of Design Concepts, and the IDEA Design Excellence Awards. In 2012, he designed and led the Python concept car project in Iran.

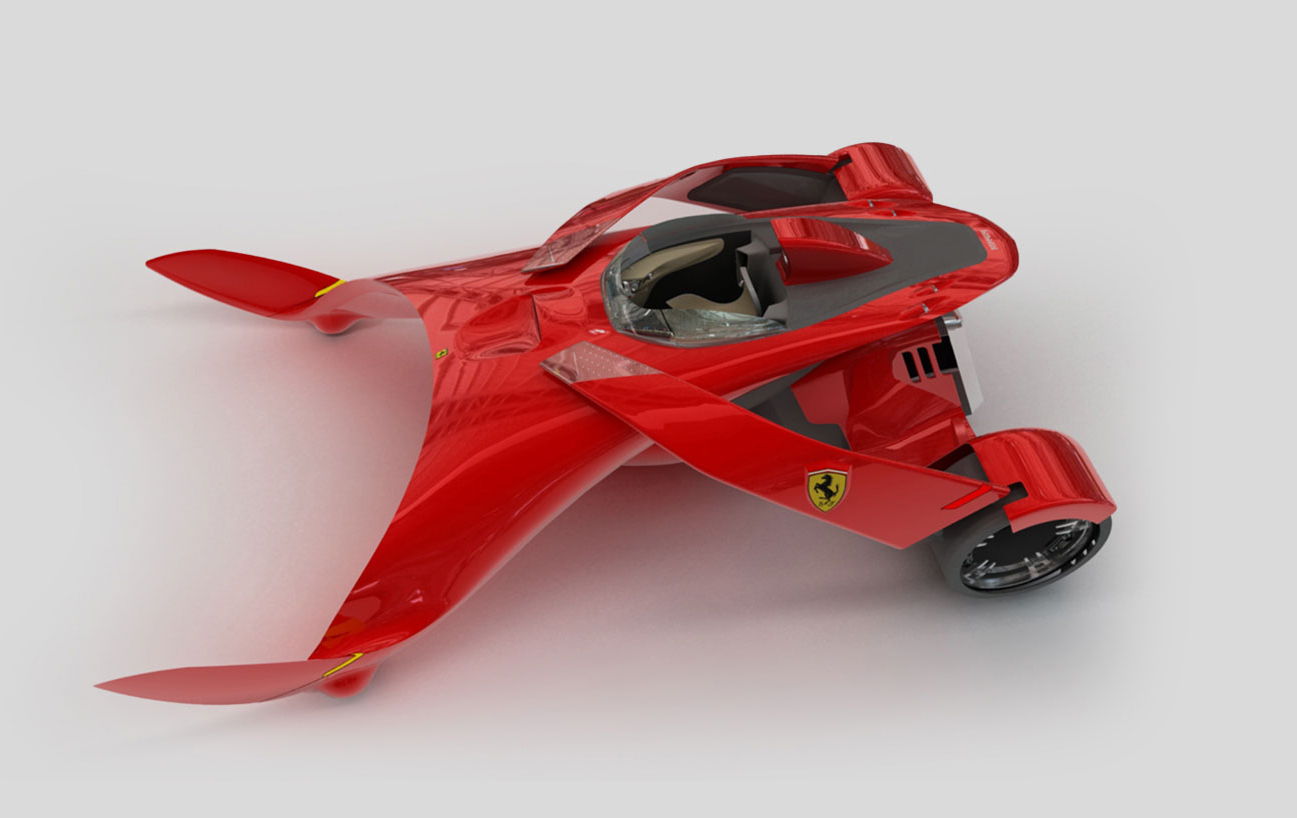
Iman Maghsoudi's Ferrari Monza concept at the 2006 Interior Motives Awards, where he secured three prestigious prizes: Overall Winner, Best Conceptual Interior, and a nomination for Best Innovation.

== Career ==
After moving to America in 2013, he established his own design studio and became more involved in luxury design, business and entrepreneurship. In the same year, he helped with the launch of concept motorcycle "Ostureh" (Myth in Persian) that was featured at Big Boys Toys. He won the Local Motors Hawaii Motors Design competition in 2009 with project iBite, and in 2014 his Aeroblade concept won the second place in the world's first 3D Printed Car Design Competition.

He established Exxeo brand in 2017 for luxury products, and its first product, the Exxeo "Eclipse" Luxury Hybrid Piano won the Platinum A' Design Award. Nargess Banks wrote in Forbes that it is "designed to disrupt the traditional piano world" with an organic shape and carbon fiber body. World Piano News described the Exxeo Piano as "visually striking."

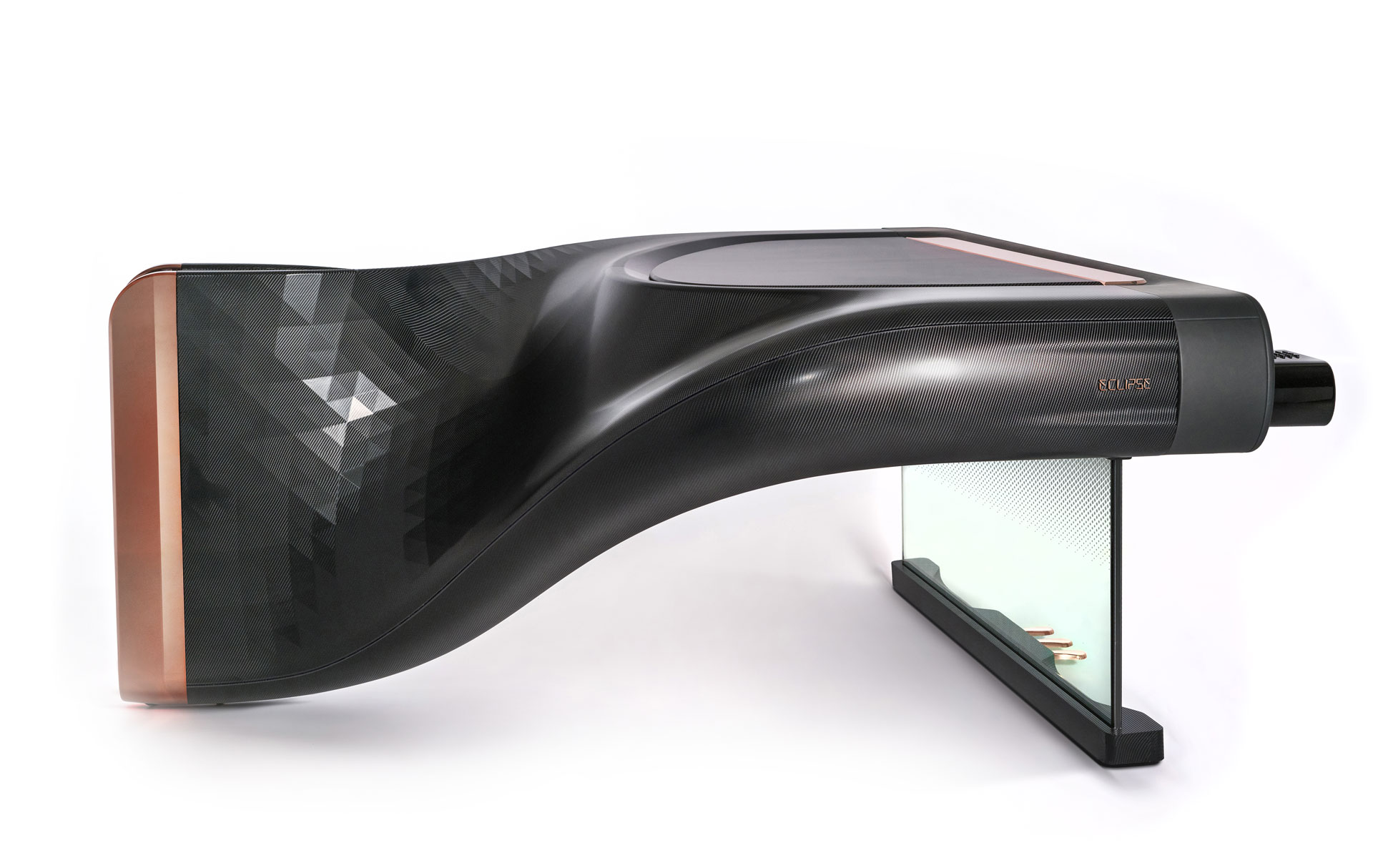
The EXXEO Eclipse piano: Is a fully customizable piano, that fits seamlessly into our modern lifestyles and contemporary interior spaces

Iman Maghsoudi founded two businesses, Connest and EXXEO. Connest focuses on modular construction. EXXEO, on the other hand, is a luxury brand.

== Awards ==
Award	Date	Category	Result	Ref.
Interior Motives Award	2006	Best Overall Automotive Interior Design	Won	
Interior Motives Award	2006	Best Conceptual Interior	Won	
Interior Motives Award	2006	Best Conceptual Exterior	Won	
Interior Motives Award	2006	Best Innovation	Nominated	
Red Dot Awards	2007	Mobility	Won	
DURA Award	2008	Cutting-Edge Automotive Design (Renault R1 Concept)	Won	
Local Motors Hawaii Motors Design	2009		Won	
IMTS	2014	Innovation Award	2nd Place	
A' Design Award	2018	Excellence in Design	Won	
International Design Awards (IDA)	2023	Limited Edition Package	Won	
A' Design Award	2023	Limited Edition and Custom Design	Won	

=== Gallery ===
A number of concept designs by Iman Maghsoudi

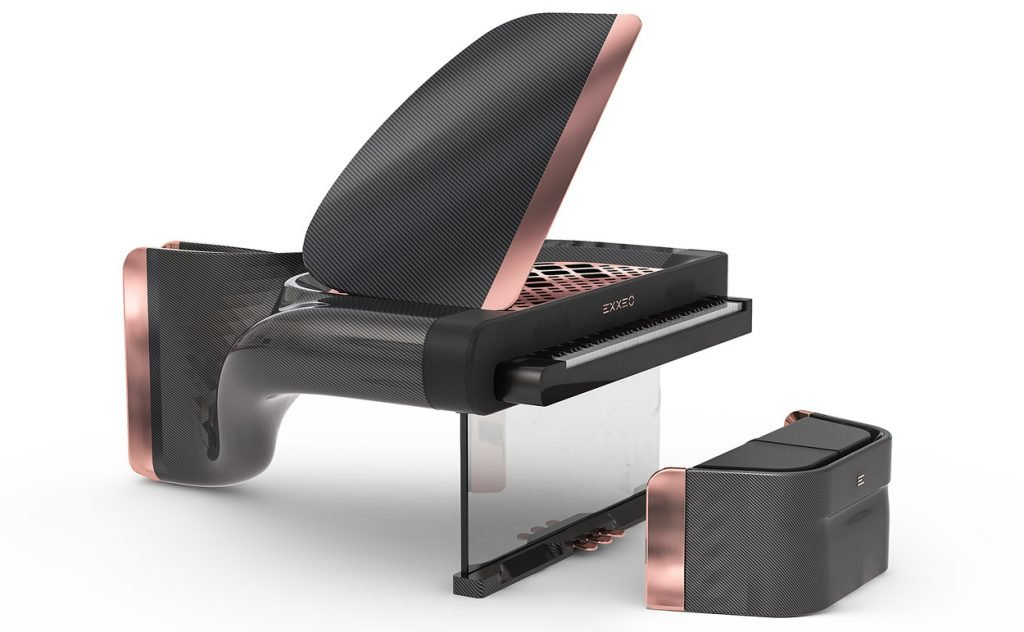
2018 Eclipse Piano

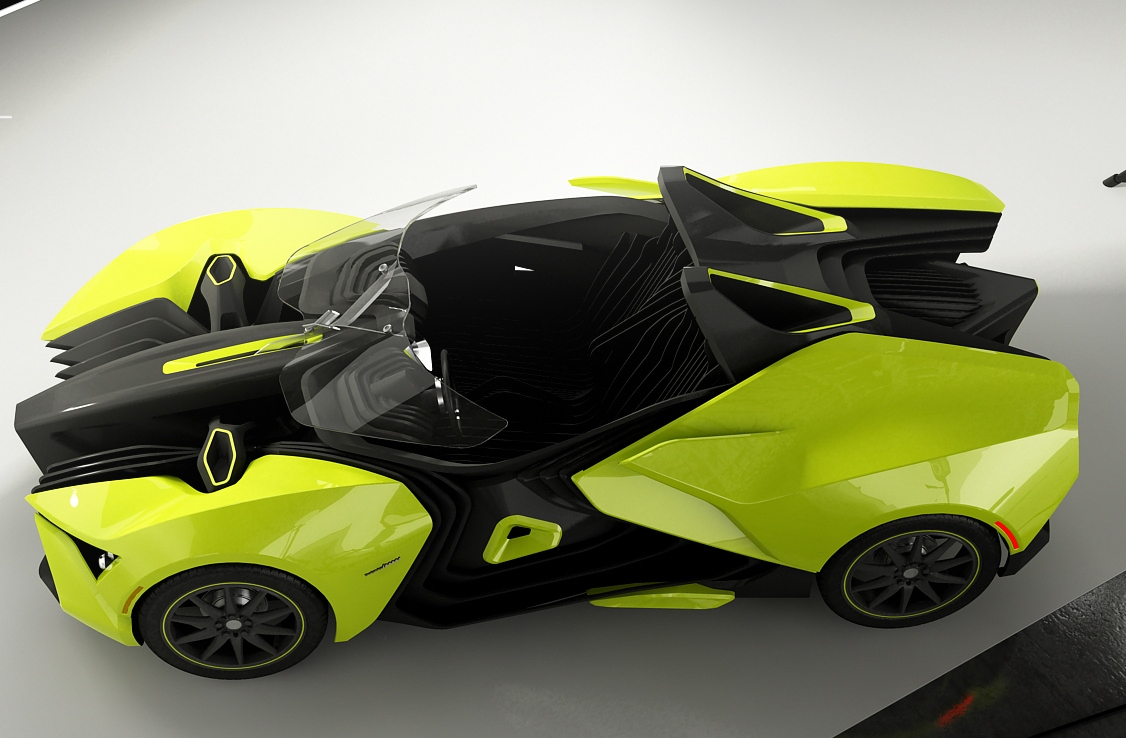
2014 Aeroblade Concept

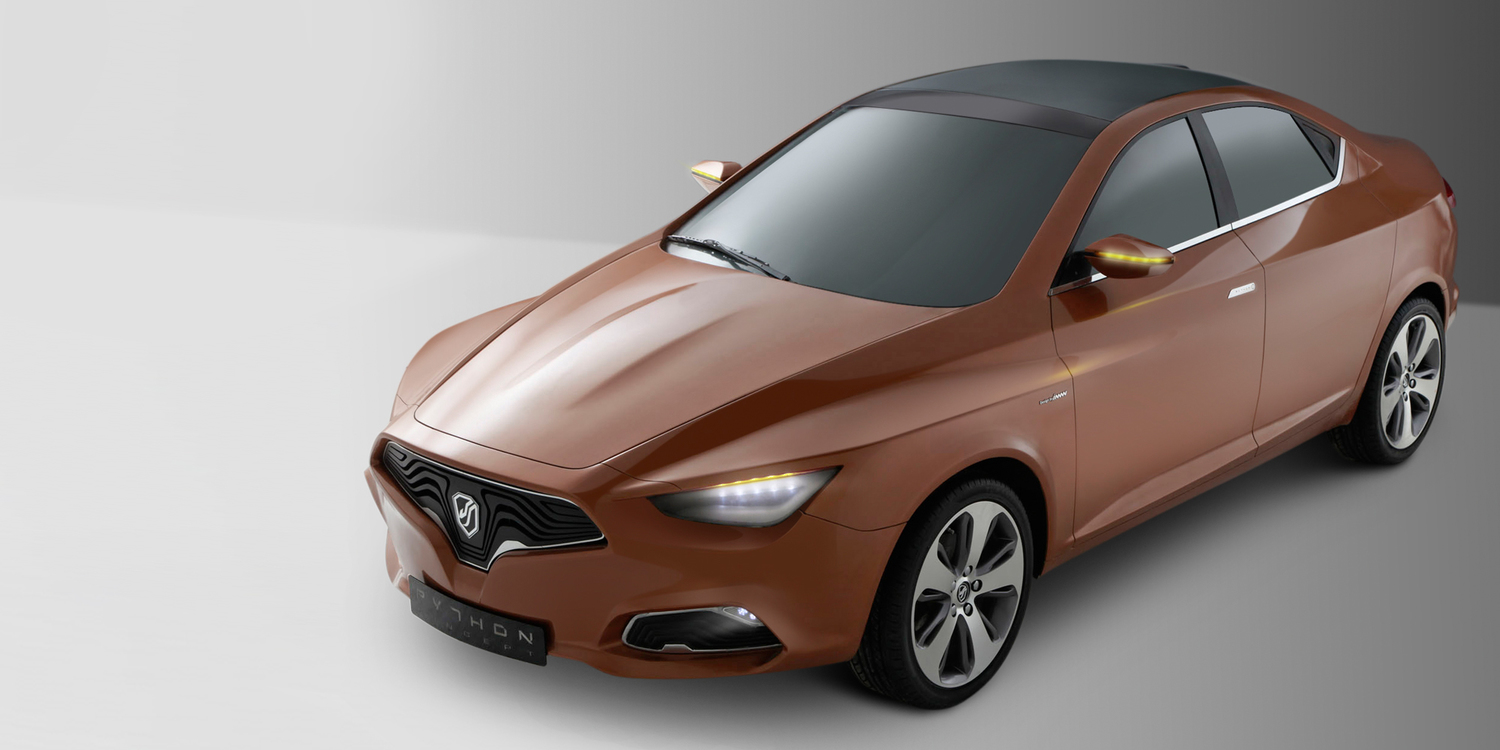
Python Concept

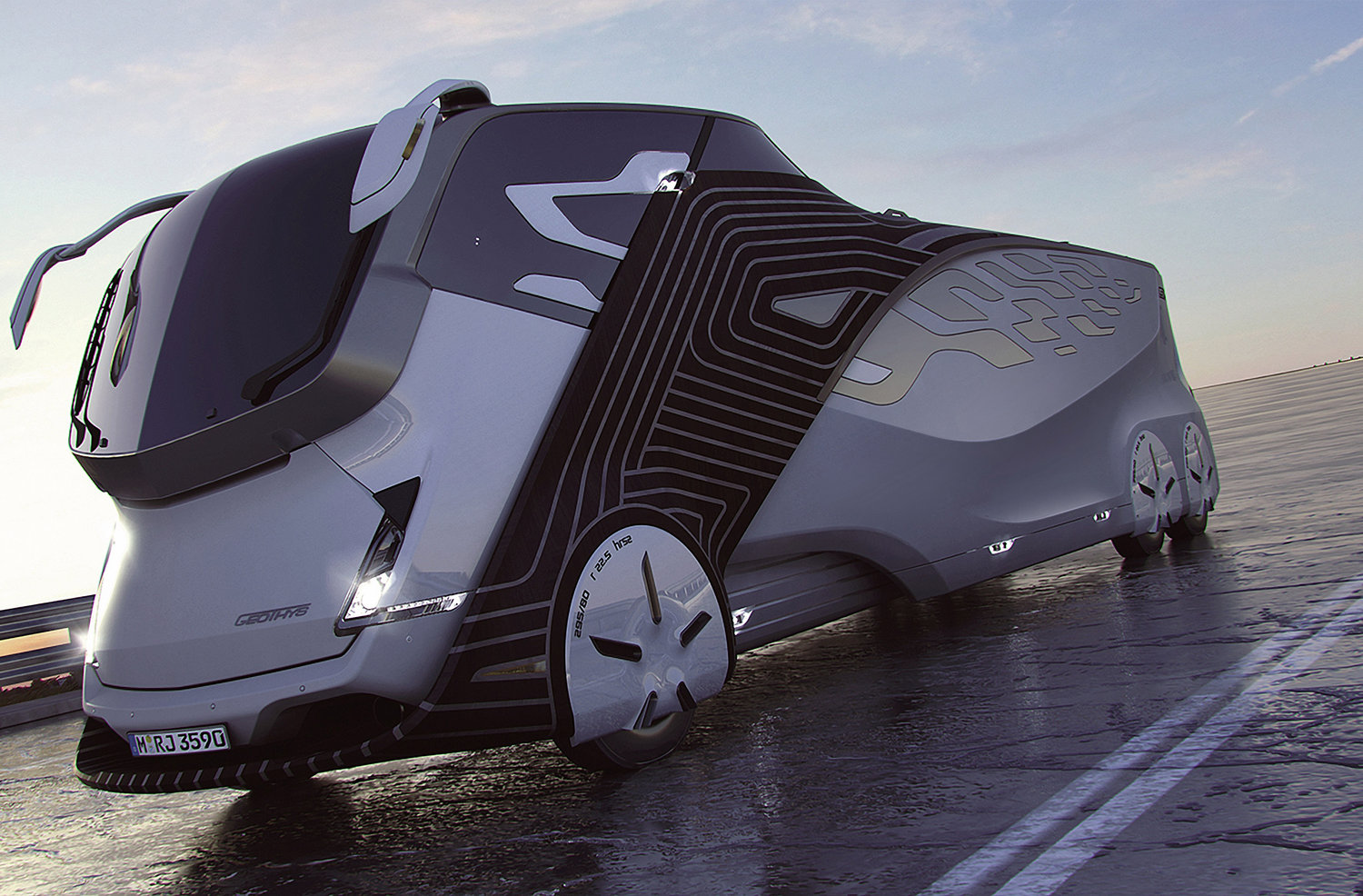
Geothys Land Yacht

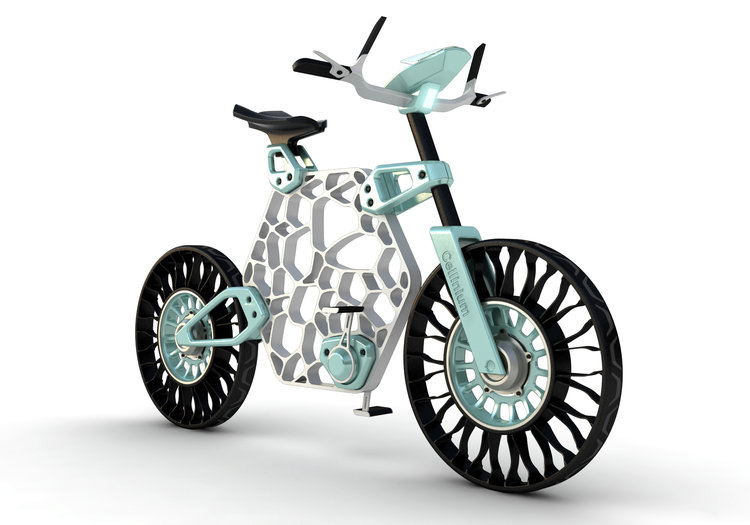
Cellinium Urban E-Bike

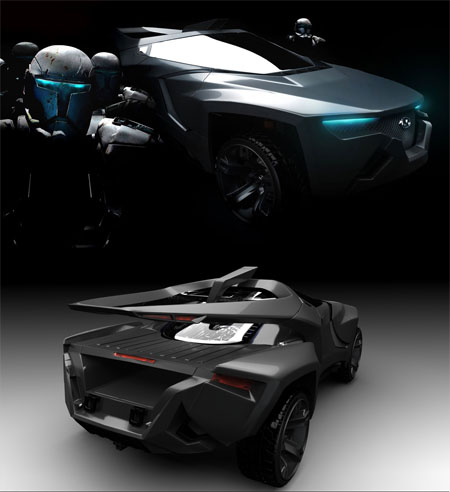
Wild-Wave Performance Truck

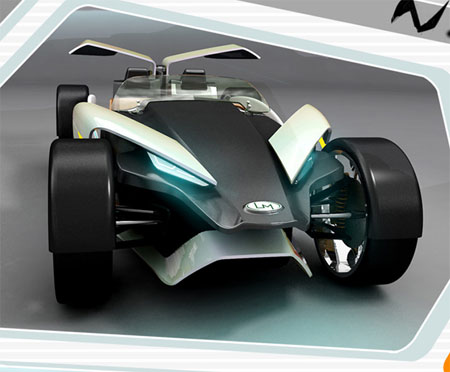
2009 iBite Concept

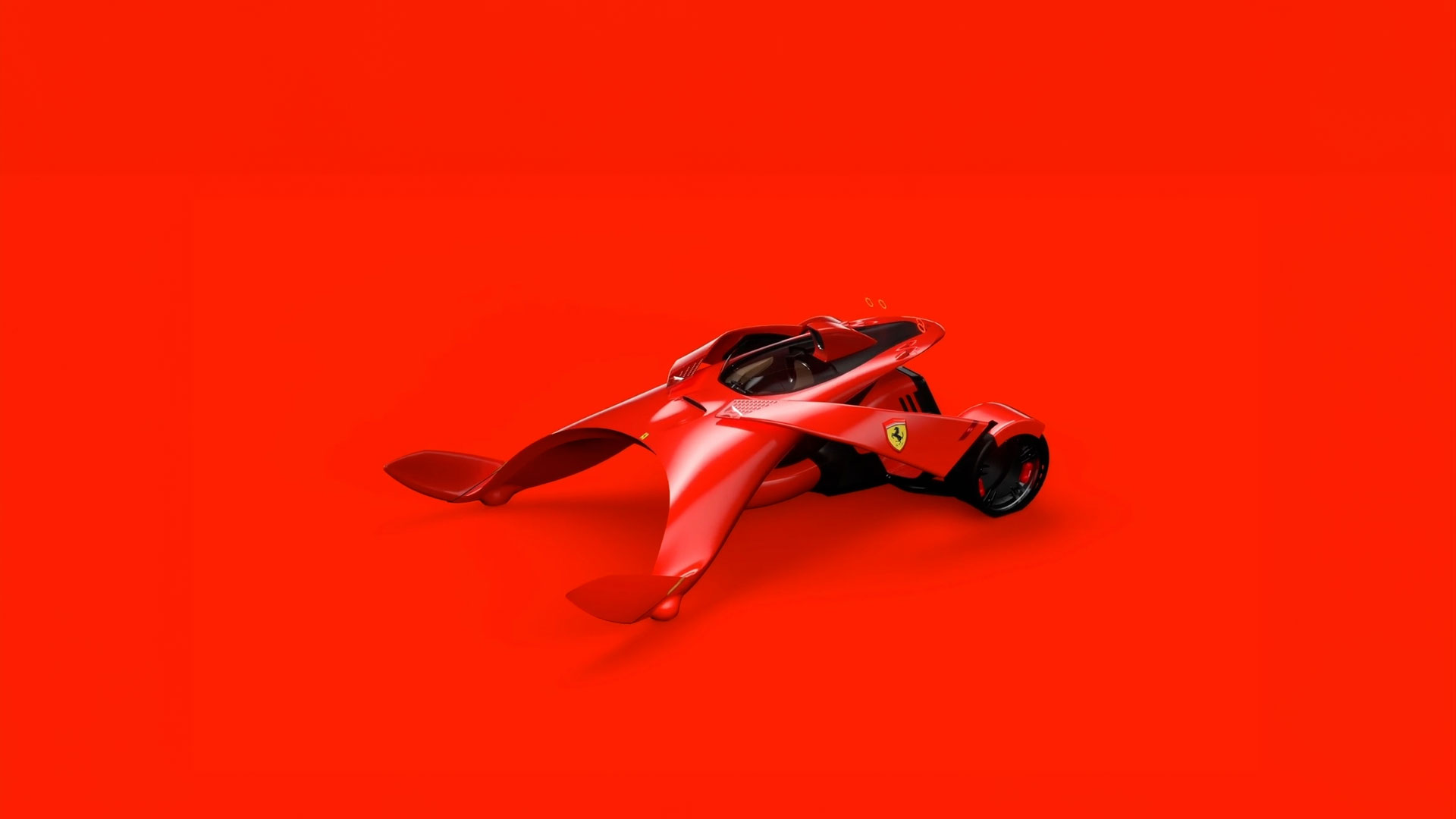
2006 Ferrari Monza Concept
