= Shahin Jamie =

Iranian actor

Shahin Jamie (born in Rasht, Iran) is an Iranian actor.

== Biography ==
Shahin Jamie began acting at age 6. His first appearance on stage took place in 1985 when he played his first comedic role. He graduated from high school during the Iran and Iraq war and a year after joined a troupe that was entertaining Iranian military soldiers; as an actor and then as a writer and director of comedy plays. After the war, he starts acting on stage in both comedic and dramatic plays. Jamie left Iran for Turkey in 1996, and in September 2000 he emigrated to the United States.

== Works ==
- Played in A Window To See written by Farhad Pakseresht and directed by Reza Mirmanavi.
- Started a comedy show for Persian satellite Melli TV, and hosted the show Labkhande Sabz until 2008.
- Started the show, Stop Sign, at jam-e-jam TV, that is ongoing. Stop Sign pokes fun at Iranian diplomats, singers, and the government.
- In 2007-2008 wrote a comedic play Gol-e Niloofar (Water Lily).
- In 2010, played in the comedic movie 2 Dareh.
