= Mohammad Reza Naseri Yazdi =

Iranian Ayatollah (b. 1945)

Mohammad Reza Naseri
- محمدرضا ناصری
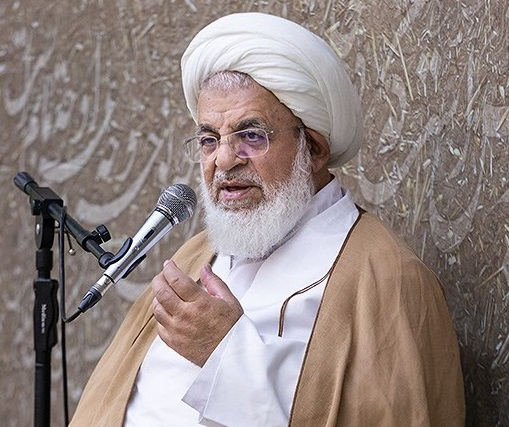

Representative of the Supreme Leader in Yazd and Imam Jumu'ah of Yazd
- Incumbent
- Assumed office 28 July 2011
- Preceded by: Mohammad Ali Saduqi

Personal details
- Born: 1945 (age 80–81) Yazd, Imperial State of Iran
- Education: Tehran

Mohammad Reza Naseri-Yazdi (Persian: محمدرضا ناصری) is an Iranian Twelver Shia cleric who is the representative of Yazd province and the Imam of Friday in the city of Yazd, who was appointed at the mentioned positions by the decree of Iran's second supreme leader, Seyyed Ali Khamenei on 28 July 2011.

Naseri-Yazdi was born in 1945 in the city of Yazd; His mother was the daughter of Qolam-Reza Yazdi (known as "Haj Sheikh QolamReza Yazdi") who was a Shia scholar. When Mohammad-Reza's mother died, his father decided to move to Tehran. After finishing elementary school, Mohammad-Reza's father sent him to be educated at the seminary of the Mujtahidi mosque. Beside his education, Mohammad-Reza used to work at construction sites. Afterwards, he commenced to teach as well as learning on his education; Naseri-Yazdi married in 1974 and has 5 children (4 sons, a daughter). This Shia cleric established a Hawzah in the province of Chaharmahal and Bakhtiari.

At a period of time, Naseri-Yazdi was also the representative of Vali-e-Faqih in the province of Chaharmahal and Bakhtiari and likewise the Imam of Friday Prayer in Shahr-e Kord—appointed by the decree of Seyyed Ruhollah Khomeini.

== See also ==
- Guardianship of the Islamic Jurist
- Imam of Friday Prayer
