= Omid Ahangar =

Iranian actor and director

- امید آهنگر
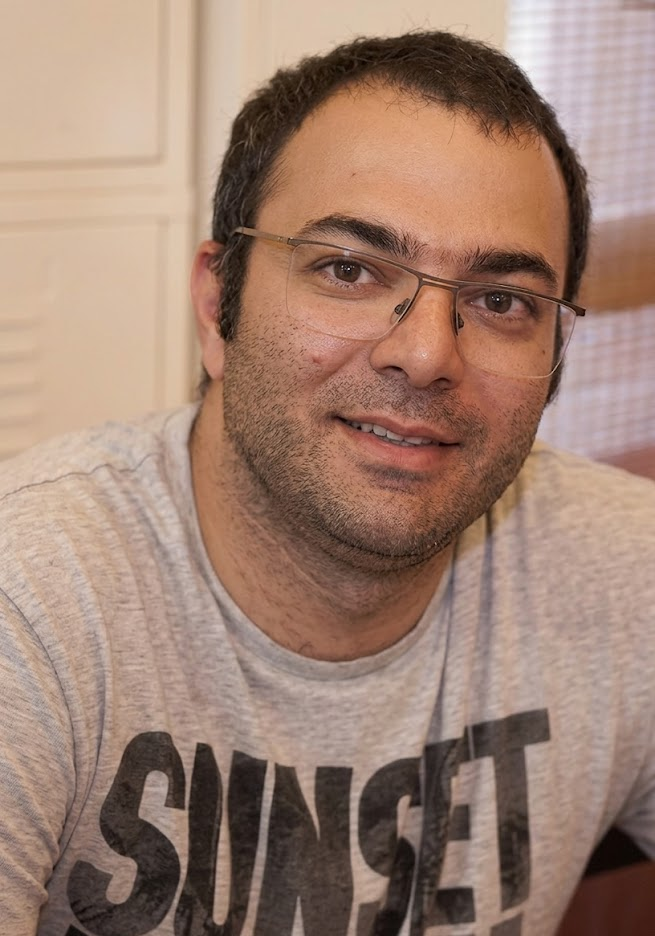
- Born: September 23, 1979; Tehran, Iran
- Education: Azad University of Arak (Literature of Drama)
- Occupations: Actor, film director, screenwriter
- Known for: Role as "Ali Kouchlou" in Ali Kouchlou (1983)

Omid Ahangar (Persian: امید آهنگر) is an Iranian actor and film director. He is mostly known for his role as "Ali Kouchlou" (Ali the Little) in the 1983 animation for children under the same title.

Omid Ahangar was born on 23 September 1979 in Tehran. He studied literature of drama at Azad University of Arak.

== Filmography ==
=== Director ===
- TAVAN (2010)
- Entezar (2011)
- JUST A WISH (2012)
- Last Station (2013)
- Safe House (2014)
- Painting (2015)
- Swamp (2015)
- Turn (2026)

=== Actor ===
- Behtarin baba-ye donya (1991)
- Ali va ghool-e jangal (1990)
- Harim-e mehrvarzi (1984)
- Tohfeha (1984)
- Sharayete eyny (1985)
- Raze cheshmeye sorkh (1992)
- gobare marg (1985)
- Ali Kocholo (1982)
- Eyd Didany (1981)
- Baftehaye ranj (acor)
- Bache mardom (1981)
- ASlahe chobi (1984)
- Gole yas (1985)
- Hamsayeha (1986)
- Medad pakkon
- Do Morghabi Dar Meh
- Khatereh ha
- Gaz
- Etefagh
- Zire gonbade kabod
- Shab Cheragh
- Mah O Khorshid
- Hampeyman
- Topoli
- Cheshm cheshm do abro
- Aziz khanom
- Majara
- KHastegary Por Majara
- Rozhaye akhar
- Aks daste jami
- Zawiye
- Tope gerd
- Khaneye mehr
- Paeez laleha
- Mosafere zaman
- Dayere tardid
- Fasle zard
- Ahoye Mahe nohom
- Razo NIaz
- Panjomin Nafar
- Vapasin Koch
- Sere Eshgh
- Botimar
- Ayeneh
- Aftabe Sard
- Game Akhar
- Hozor
- Golestane jang
- Eynam ye Joreshe
- Khat shekan
- Dehkhoda
- Sisakht
- Shibe Tond
- Shabe Sarbaz
- Khate Barik
- Daftar Dar
- Tolo
- Dena
- Ta Hozor
- Bazgasht
- Neshani
