= Ramezan Hajjimashhadi =

Iranian lawyer

Ramezan Hajjimashhadi (Persian: رمضان حاجی مشهدی) is a prominent lawyer in Iran who has represented several well-known political and human rights activists, journalist and authors.

Born in Kalajan village, west of Gorgan, Hajjimashhadi was arrested in 1975 during the reign of the Shah of Iran and imprisoned for his leftist political leanings and activism. He was released in 1978.

Hajjimashhadi studied law at Tehran University. After receiving his degree, he practiced commercial law for some time but continued his political activism and defense of human rights. He has represented activists such as Nobel laureate Shirin Ebadi, renowned author Moniro Ravanipour and journalist Khalil Rostamkhani for their involvement in the Berlin Conference on Iran, and one of the most important modern Iranian poets, Ahmad Shamlou. Much of his work has defended the freedom of expression. In that role, he has represented several weekly magazines and newspapers in Iran targeted by the regime, such as Hambastegi, Mardom-Salari, and Nowrooz.
