= Abdul Karim Farhani =

Iranian Ayatollah

- عبدالکریم فرحانی
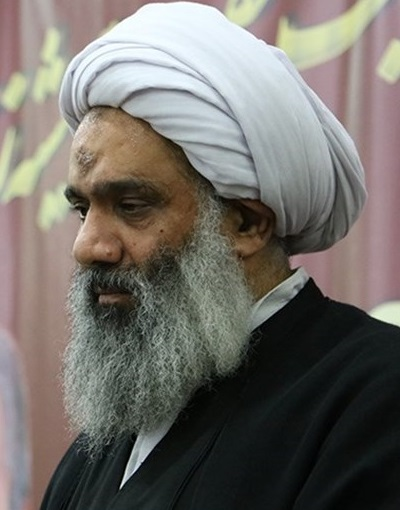
- Abdul Karim Farhani

Personal life
- Born: 1964 (age 61–62) Ahwaz

Religious life
- Religion: Islam
- Denomination: Shi'a
- School: Twelver

Abdul Karim Farhani (Persian: عبدالکریم فرحانی) is an Iranian principlist and former member of the Assembly of Experts, representing Khuzestan province. He was born in Ahwaz in 1964 (1343SH). Ayatollah Bahjat and Ayatollah Fazel Lankarani are among his famous teachers in high-level classes in Qom Seminary. He is a teacher of Arabic literature, logic, Fiqh, and philosophy.
