= Zayn al-Din Taybadi =

Iranian Sufi mystic

Mowlana Zayn al-Dīn Abūbakr Tāybādi (in Persian: مولانا زین الدین ابوبکر تایبادی) (died 1389) was an Iranian mystic and Sufi. His tombstone was built on an order by Ghiyath al-Din Pir Ahmad Khvafi who was at the time Shahrukh Mirza's vizier.
