= Ali Kazemi Gilani =

Iranian politician

- علی کاظمی گیلانی

Member of the Assembly of Experts
- Constituency: Gilan

Personal details
- Born: 1967 (age 58–59) Bandar Anzali, Gilan province

Ali Kazemi Gilani (born 1967, Abkenar, Bandar Anzali) is an Iranian Shiite politician and cleric who was elected as a representative of Gilan province in the sixth term of the Assembly of Experts. He is a professor at a seminary and university and a representative of the Leader of the Islamic Republic at universities and seminaries. He has 30 years of teaching experience at the Qom seminary and teaches at the highest level of the seminary and at the universities of Tehran and Gilan. He was also a high-ranking member of the Revolutionary Guards' promotion department.

== Biography ==
Ali Kazemi was born on June 27, 1967, in a farming family in the village of Abkenar, Bandar Anzali. After completing his primary and secondary education in 1982, he went to the Vali-Asr Seminary in Tabriz to study religious sciences. He went to Tehran in 1984 and continued his education and refinement at the Seminary of the Tehran Fighting Clergy Society. After graduating from basic courses, he came to Qom in 1985 and studied jurisprudence with Fazel Lankarani, Javadi Amoli, and Abdullah Khaefi, principles with Sobhani, the late Salehi Mazandarani, and interpretation with Javadi Amoli, Shab-e-Zandehdar, Khazali, and ethics with the late Meshkini and Mazaheri. He was one of Sobhani's known students in the sciences of Rijal, Hadith, and Dirayah.

== Teachers ==
Among his known teachers are as follows:

- Fazel Lankarani
- Javadi Amoli
- Abdullah Khaefi
- Sobhani
- Salehi Mazandarani
- Shab Zendehdar
- Khazali
- Meshkini
- Mazaheri

== Compilations ==
Among his known compilations are:

- Miftah al-Kifayah; Sharh al-Kifayah al-Usul”,
- Pathology of Quranic Interpretation
- Revealed Verses; Satanic Imagination”

== Records and responsibilities ==
- Head of the Scientific-Research Working Group of the Office of the Elites of the Martyrs and the Martyrs of the Martyrs and the Martyrs Foundation
- Member of the Seminary and University Commission of the Assembly of Representatives of Students and Scholars of the Seminary
- Outstanding Scholar of Qom Seminary, 2003, honored in the hall of Dar Al-Shifa High School.
- Professor of foreign and higher education at Qom Seminary with more than 30 years of teaching experience
