= Ali Ghanbari =

Iranian-American photojournalist (born 1950)

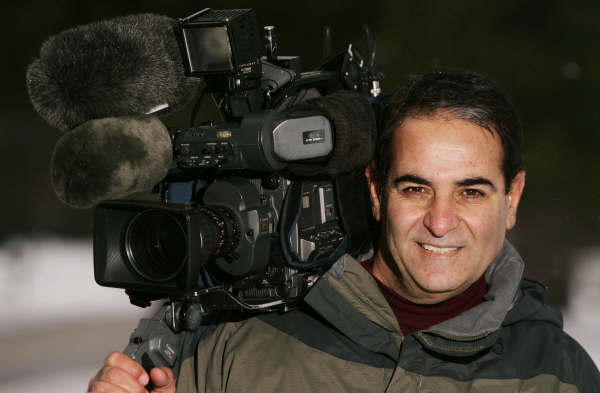
Ali Ghanbari

Ali Ghanbari (born 1950 in Abadan, Iran) is an Iranian-American photojournalist who has worked at Fox affiliate WJW in Cleveland, Ohio, since 1994.

From 1982 to 1994 he was a photojournalist at NBC affiliate WKEF in Dayton, Ohio. Ghanbari has largely been self-taught and has been recognized with over 600 awards from numerous professional journalism organizations. Ghanbari won National Press Photographers Association National 1st Place General News and Honorable Mention News Feature awards in 2012; he was named the 1998 NPPA Region 4 Photographer of the Year and 2012 Central General News Photographer of the Year; and the NPPA Region 4 runner-up in 2000 and 2003.

He is the only 12 X Ohio News Photographers Association Television Photographer of the Year (1993, 1995, 1996, 1997, 1998, 2003, 2010, 2011, 2012, 2013, 2017, 2018). Ghanbari has also been named a six-XAssociated Press (State of Ohio) Best TV Photographer; seven-X Society of Professional Journalist (Ohio) Best TV Videographer. Ghanbari has been awarded 28 individual NATAS Lower Great Lakes Emmy; and was honored for the best video-essay package by RTNDA year 2000. He was awarded the National Headliner Award in 2012 and 2014; numerous news photography 1st place awards by the Ohio Excellence in Journalism (Press Club).

From 1995 to 2012, Ghanbari spoke at several Buckeye TV seminar programs (the original Buckeye Television seminar was the brainchild of Ali Ghanbari). He served as a national speaker for the NPPA Airborne TV seminar in 1994, was a featured speaker for the NPPA 1995 Flying Short Course in Detroit, Michigan, the 1998 FSC in Cleveland, Ohio, and the 1998 National Short Course in Baltimore, Maryland. He was an NPPA 2001 national judge in St. Petersburg, Florida, and the Eyes of History 2006 White House News Photographers Association in Washington, DC.

In June 2020, Ghanbari was inducted Silver Circle Lower Great Lakes Chapter The National Academy of Television Arts & Sciences. Ghanbari retired in July 2020 aged 70, after 37 years as a Television news photographer. In July 2020 Ghanbari was awarded Robert S.Carson Memorial Award from ONPA for outstanding contribution to photojournalism in Ohio is considered ONPA's highest honor also Ghanbari's name was added to the ONPA Television Photographer Of the Year plague for the annual contest.
