= Alireza Azmandian =

Iranian writer and academic

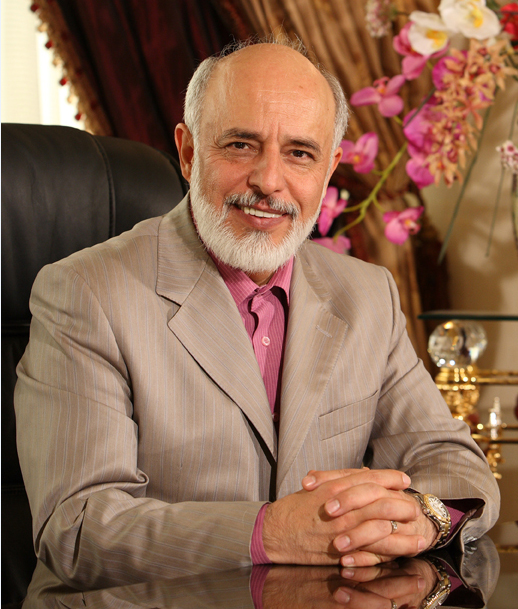
- Alireza Azmandian (in 2009)
- Born: Tehran
- Occupations: Author, Motivational Speaker
- Spouse: Azam Bakhtiarian
- Website: https://instagram.com/dralirezaazmandian

Alireza Azmandian (Persian: علیرضا آزمندیان; born 1953) is an Iranian Author, lecturer and motivational speaker He received a Ph.D. in industrial and systems engineering at the University of Southern California. Azmandian established the cultural-scientific institute Padideh Fekr in 1997 in Iran to develop and teach the self-help system Technology of Thought.

== Books ==
- Think Yourself Successful: Rewire Your Mind, Become Confident and Achieve Your Goals. 2010 McGraw-Hill, ISBN 0-07-174124-0 / 9780071741248
