= Bahram Soroush =

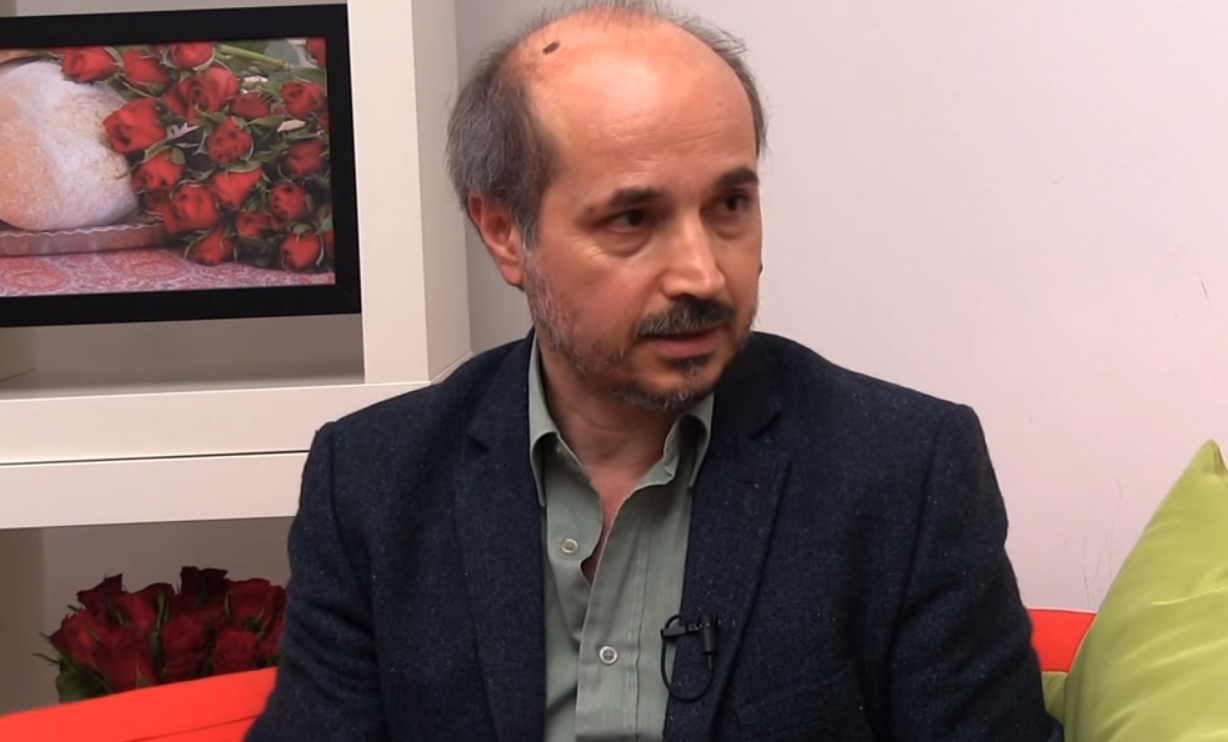
Bahram Soroush on the Bread and Roses TV programme in 2014

Bahram Soroush (Persian: بهرام سروش) is a UK-based civil rights activist and a member of the Worker-Communist Party of Iran Central Committee.

== Biography ==
As a teenager, Soroush took part in demonstrations against the regime of the Shah during the Iranian Revolution (1978–79). He and his fellow secularist progressive protesters were surprised and disappointed that the Islamists managed to take hold of the revolution and turn the Westernised Imperial State of Iran into an Islamic republic.

In June 2007, Soroush became one of the co-founders of the Council of Ex-Muslims of Britain (CEMB).

== Views ==
According to Soroush, it is "very difficult to try to separate Islam from Islamic terrorist organisations". In a conference held in June 2006, Bahram said that the "Iranian government is antiworker and anti-human" Soroush has said that the Islamic Republic is not a representative of the Iranian people and that it would be dangerous for the Republic to attain nuclear weapons.

In Soroush's view, the term Islamophobia is being used to "stifle the criticism of Islam" and that "considering the atrocities" committed by Islamic movements, terrorist attacks and honour killings in Muslim countries, it is "understandable that people should have a dislike of Islam and that this negative perception of Islam should have grown".
