= Taghi Rezaei =

- professional bodybuilder

Personal info
- Born: August 6, 1991 (age 34); Tehran, Iran

Best statistics
- Height: 175 cm (5 ft 9 in)
- Weight: 79 kg (174 lb)
Medal record
Men's bodybuilding
IFBB
2nd	2022 Spain	Men's Physics
Arnold Classic
2nd	2021 Spain	Men's Physics
Binous classic
1st	2024 Emirates	Men's Physics

Taghi Rezaei (Persian: تقی رضایی; born 6 August 1991) is an Iranian bodybuilder. He is a member of the Iranian national bodybuilding team. Rezaei participated at the 2022 World Bodybuilding Championship, winning a silver medal. He won a silver medal at the competition 2021 Arnold Classic in Spain. He won the gold medal in the Binous Classic international competition Emirates 2024.

== Sports History ==
Taghi Rezaei started his career in bodybuilding in 2013. He is a four-time consecutive national champion of Iran. In addition to several championships in the country, he was invited to the national team camp in 2019. He is the runner-up of the IFBB World Championships in 2022 and the runner-up of the Arnold Classic Physique competition in 2021. He won the gold medal in the Binous Classic international competition Emirates 2024. He is the judge of fitness competitions, the official coach of the federation Iran and the international fae coach from Europe. He also managed to receive the Elite Pro card in this competition.

== Honors ==
Since 2019, Rezaei has won various titles in national championships Iran. In 2021, he became the world runner-up in the Spanish Arnold Classic physics competition. He won the silver medal at the 2022 World Championships in Spain. He won the gold medal in the Binous Classic international competition Emirates 2024.

== Competitions ==
- Emirates International Binous Classic Tournament 2024
- Spanish World Championship in 2022
- Spanish Arnold Classic physics competitions in 2021
- Championship of Iran
