= Majid Adibzadeh =

Iranian writer

- Born: 1980 (age 45–46)
- Education: Political science
- Occupations: Writer, historian

Majid Adibzadeh (Persian: مجید ادیب‌زاده, born 1980) is an Iranian writer.

== Research ==
His books deal with topics such as "theories of democracy", "human sciences and universities in Iran", "The origins of modern rationality and modernity in Iran", "The modern state in Iran", "The historical conditions of Scientific thinking in Iran", "Modern Persian Literature and Iranian political culture" and "Iranian discourses and Political challenges Between Iran and the West".

== Bibliography ==
- The uprisings of the rationalization at the dawn of modern Iran. Tehran: Qoqnoos Publication. 2014. ISBN 978-600-278-078-2.
- The Genealogy of scientific thinking in Iran. Tehran: Alefbaye Farhang Publication. 2013. ISBN 978-600-93557-0-9.
- Empire of myths and image of the West: Psychoanalysis of literary discourse in Iran From 1953 to 1978. Tehran: Qoqnoos Publication. 2012. ISBN 978-964-311-991-1.
- Fertile Modernity and Unproductive Thinking: The historical challenge modern State and fertility of the Humanities in Iran. Tehran: Qoqnoos Publication. 2011. ISBN 978-964-311-911-9.
- Knowledge democracy: About the democratization of knowledge. Tehran: Qoqnoos Publication. 2009. ISBN 978-964-311-802-0.
- Language, discourse and foreign policy: Dialectic representation of the West in the Iranian symbolic world. Tehran: Akhtaran Publication. 2008. ISBN 978-964-8897-54-8.
