= Mona Paad =

Iranian sculptor

Mona Paad (born in 1974 in Tehran) is an Iranian sculptor, soprano singer, translator, and industrial design engineer. She is an active contemporary sculptor and was educated in the school of Parviz Tanavoli.

Paad has been Iran’s representative at the International Art Medal Federation (FIDEM), and since 2018, she has been part of the jury in the Sohrab Art Medal Competition. Her works are kept in private collections in Tehran, Dubai, England, France, Germany, and the US.

Paad translated the book "Lost Wax Casting: old, new and Inexpensive Methods" in 2017, and in it, she discussed simple, low-cost, and homemade casting methods.

In a 4 September 2010 interview with Sole, Parviz Tanavoli was asked about the artists he follows with interest. In response, he expressed admiration for the sculptures of Mona Paad, particularly noting their contemporary mystical messages and poetic qualities rooted in the mystical poetry of figures such as Rumi. Tanavoli highlighted Paad as part of the generation known as "Children of the Revolution", born during the 1979 revolution, an era marked by challenges as their childhood and adolescence were significantly impacted by the revolution and the Iran–Iraq War.

== Shows and exhibitions ==
Notable exhibitions of Paad's work include:

- 2006, Group show, Asar Gallery, Tehran
- 2010, Group show, Haft Negah, Niavaran Cultural Center, Tehran
- 2010, Solo show, Golestan Gallery, Tehran
- 2010, Solo show, Etemad Gallery, Tehran
- 2011, Group show, Shirin Gallery, Tehran
- 2012, Group show, Haft Negah, Niavaran Cultural Center, Tehran
- 2012, Group show, To Support Iran MS Society, Mahe-mehr Gallery, Tehran
- 2013, Solo show, Etemad Gallery, Tehran
- 2015, Solo show, "Parallel Creation", Etemad Gallery, Tehran
- 2016, Did Gallery, Group exhibition
- 2017, Group show, Azad Art Gallery, Tehran
- 2018, Group show, Etemad Gallery - Negarestan, Tehran
- 2019, Art fair, Teer Art, Represented by Etemad Gallery, Tehran
- 2019, Solo show, "A Review of Works (Mona Paad 2006-2019)", Etemad Gallery, Tehran
- 2019, Art fair, Teer Art, Represented by Etemad Gallery, Tehran
- 2022, Artibition Gallery
