= Nasser Fakouhi =

Iranian anthropologist, writer and translator

Nasser Fakouhi ناصر فکوهی
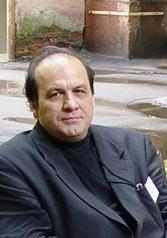

Personal details
- Born: 13 May 1956 (age 70) Tehran, Iran
- Education: University of Paris

Nasser Fakouhi (born 13 May 1956 in Tehran) (Persian: ناصر فکوهی) is an Iranian anthropologist, writer and translator.

Fakouhi was born to a middle-class family in Tehran. He is a professor of anthropology of the Faculty of Social Sciences, University of Tehran and the president of a scientific and multidisciplinary website called Anthropology and Culture (www.anthropology.ir). He is also a member of International Association of Sociology and International Society of Iranian Studies.

Fakouhi obtained his PhD in political anthropology from the University of Paris in 1993. Some of his books are Political Violence, The History and Theories of Anthropology, Urban Anthropology, From Culture to Development, and Iranian National and Ethnic Identities: Articulation and Conflict. He has translated books of authors such as Roland Barthes (Empire of Signs).

Ramin Jahanbegloo, an Iranian intellectual and philosopher, classified Fakouhi, along with figures such as J. Tabatabaii, B. Ahmadi, and F.Sadeghi as "dialogical intellectuals" on contemporary Iran.

Fakouhi's primary field of interest is the social pathology of contemporary Iran and especially the problems concerning the ethnic, communitarian and local identities in their relationship with the global level. He has a large oral and written project about the Modern Iran Cultural history.

== Books ==
Although Fakouhi has published largely in Persian, he has also contributed to chapters in English and French books. He has translated about 20 books from French and English into Persian. He is the author of more than 300 lectures, reviews, notes, essays, and interviews in scientific and public journals and reviews in Persian and a few in English and French.

Publications in Persian:

- Political violence : Theories, Concepts and Forms; 1998, Tehran: Ghatreh Ed.,
- Political Mythology : Art, Myths and Power;1998, Tehran: Ferdos Ed
- From Culture to Development; 1999, Tehran: Ferdos Ed., Tehran.
- Applied Anthropology and Development; 2003, Tehran: Afkar Ed..
- History of Anthropological Thought and Theories; 2003, Tehran: Ney Ed.
- Urban Anthropology; 2003, Tehran: Ney Ed.
- In the Labyrinths of Globalization; 2004, Tehran: Ney Ed.
- Pieces of Anthropology; 2005, Tehran:Ney Ed.
- Conflict and Articulation : Iranian identity and ethnicity; 2009, Tehran: GolAzin Ed.
- Anthropology of Art, Myths and Politics; 2012, Tehran: Sales Ed.
- Anthropological Discourse; 2012, Tehran: Mehrnamak (Forthcoming).

Contributions to collective publications in English and French :

« Manger avec les Morts : le pique-nique en Iran », in Barthes-Deloizy, F., 2008, Le Pique- Nique ou l’éloge d’un bonheur ordinaire, Paris: Ed. Bréal.

« Making and remaking an Academic Tradition: Towards an Indigenous Anthropology in Iran », Chapter 5, in Najmabadi, Sh.(ed.), 2010, Conceptualizing Iranian Anthropology, Past and Present Perspectives, New York & Oxford : Berghahn Books.

Traductions into Persian:

- Roland, R., La Vie de Tolstoi; 1986, Tehran : Danesh Ed.
- Roland, R., Les Mémoires de la Jeunesse; 1990, Tehran : Ferdos Ed.
- Bettelheim, Ch., Les Luttes de classes en URSS(1930–1941), 3ème et 4ème volumes et postface à la traduction en persan : Les Années Gorbatchev; 1996, Tehran : Ney Ed.
- Paz, O., Rire et pénitence; 1998, Tehran : Toos Ed.
- Rivière, Cl., Introduction à l'ethnologie; 2004, Tehran : Ney Ed.
- Breton, R., Ethnopolitiques; 2005, Tehran : Ney Ed..
- Barthes, R., L'Empire des signes; Tehran, 2005, Ney Ed.
- Rouch J. et al., Introduction au cinéma ethnographiques, recueille de texte par N; Fakouhi; 2006, Tehran : Ney Ed.
- Rivière, Cl., Anthropologie politique; 2006, Tehran : Ney Ed.
- Bloch, M., Anthropologie cognitive à l'épreuve de terrain, Leçon inaugurale au Collège de France,;2007, Tehran : Ney. Ed.
- Augé, M., Anthropologie, 2009, Tehran : Ney Ed.
- Bourdieu, P.; 2009, Leçon sur la Leçon, Tehran : Ney Ed..
- L'Homme et la Culture, receuilles de textes des auteurs européens en sciences sociales et humaines;2010, Tehran : Javid Ed.,.
- JMG.Le Clézio, Mondo et les autres histoires; 2011, Tehran : Mahriz,.
- Bourdieu, P., Sur la Télévision; 2011, Tehran : Javid Ed..
- Levy Strauss, C., L'Anthropologe Structurale, 2 vols.; Tehran : Javid Ed. (forthcoming)
- Camu, A., Réflections sur la Guillotine; Tehran : Javid Ed. (Forthcoming)
- Barthes, R., Leçon, Leçon inaugurale au Collège de France; Javid Ed., Tehran : Javid Ed.(Forthcoming).
- Foucault, M.; Leçon inaugurale au Collège de France; Tehran : Javid Ed. (Forthcoming).
- Political Violence;
- History and Theories of Anthropology;
- Urban Anthropology
- From Culture to development
- Iranian National and Ethnic Identities : Articulation and Conflict

== Media activities ==
Upon his return, Fakouhi was first began his activities in the Ministry of Energy as the director of a large public information program in favor of sustainable consumption . This period lasted for five years (1994–1998) . In the same time he continued his translations into Persian and began his activities including collaboration with Newspapers such as Sarmaye (economic); Hamshahri (General), Shargh (political and social), as well as intellectual journals such as Shahrvand, Mehrname, etc.. So while continuing his scientific work (teaching and publishing) and his translator work, he published widely in media, including in the form of notes and interviews and social policies in the field of international and Iranian culture. From 1995 he created a website called Anthropology and Culture (www.anthropology.ir) is ranked today at 125,000 in Alexa ranking and has more than 4 to 5000 visitors per day. This site is the more visited Persian site on the Iranian culture. Fakouhi has created also the IIAC (Iranian Institute of Anthropology and Culture). Today IIAC has the support and collaboration of more than 200 scholars, intellectuals, students etc. From more than 20 countries worldwide. During its activity IIAC has succeeded to gather a group of young graduates, academics and intellectuals to form a social network and organize various sessions of social fiction films and documentary projections, books critics, meetings etc.. For over seven years, being a member of Board (2006–2010)of Sociological Association of Iran(Member of International Sociological Association) and professor of Tehran University, he focused many of these activities in the Faculty of Social Sciences in Tehran University and where is situated also the Association.

== Scientific activities ==
=== Cultural History of Modern Iran Project (CHMIP) ===
Since 1998, Fakouhi began an extensive project on cultural history, studying the formation and evolution of Iranian culture which followed the end of the Qajar era (late 19th) until today. This project largely inspired by the Annales school and the theories of Cultural History (Braudel, Burke, Nora etc...), it aims to bring together the largest number of historical data on Iranian culture in all its forms (visual, literature, and language, oral, semiotic. etc.;) To create the possibility of different synchronic and diachronic analysis of this culture. It begins with central Persian culture and continues in the non-Persian and peripheral cultures of the country. For this project, Fakouhi required a consistent working group of anthropologists, sociologists and historians and needed to try and find ways of funding an enormous budget. He also started a large series of interviews with the most important cultural figures In recent history.

Collaboration with the Academy of Persian Language and Literature since October 2011, Fakouhi is at the head of an ad hoc collaboration between the vocabulary section of the Academy of Persian Language and Literature and the Association of Sociology of Iran. This committee made up of translators, writers and sociologists and recognized member of the Association, has the task of creating and approving the vocabulary of idioms in the social sciences in the new scientific language of Iran.
