= Azadeh Ensha =

Iranian-American journalist

- Born: Tehran, Iran
- Education: UCLA, Columbia University
- Occupation: journalist
- Notable credit(s): The New York Times; The Guardian; The Huffington Post

Azadeh Ensha (Persian: آزاده انشاﻋ, born in Tehran, Iran) is an Iranian-American journalist who works for The New York Times. She has written for the business, foreign, metro, style and culture desks.

== Personal ==
Fluent in Persian and French, Ensha graduated summa cum laude, Phi Beta Kappa from UCLA and received a master's degree from the Columbia University Graduate School of Journalism.
