= List of hujjat al-Islams =

This is a partial list of hujjatul Islams, a title given to mid ranked Twelver Usuli Shi'a Muslim clerics.

The next higher clerical rank is ayatollah, followed by grand ayatollah. This list contains only the names of those who have attained the rank hojjatol Eslam/ hojjatol Eslam wa Muslimeen. To see the list of ayatollahs or grand ayatollahs, see the following articles: List of ayatollahs; List of current maraji; List of deceased maraji.

Hierarchy of titles for Shia Muslim clerics:

- Grand ayatollah (marja')
- Ayatollah
- Hujjatol Islam

== Current ==
This is a list of hujjatul Islams who are alive. The list is arranged in descending order of age, (oldest to youngest).

No	Image	Name	Birth date CE	Birth place	Residence	Notes
1		Mehdi Karroubi مهدی کروبی	26 September 1937 (age 89)	(Pahlavi Iran) Aligudarz, Iran	Iran	Currently under house arrest
2		Ghodratollah Alikhani قدرت‌الله علیخانی	1939 (age 86–87)	(Pahlavi Iran) Takestan County, Iran	Iran	-
3		al-Sayyid Muhammad al-Tijani al-Samawi السيد محمد التيجاني السماوي	2 February 1943 (age 83)	Gafsa, Tunisia	Tunisia	Ex-Sunni preacher
4		Seyed Mohammad Khatami سید محمد خاتمی	14 October 1943 (age 83)	(Pahlavi Iran) Ardakan, Iran	Iran	5th President of Iran
5		Gholamhossein Mohammadi Golpayegani غلامحسین محمدی گلپایگانی	1943 (age 82–83)	(Pahlavi Iran) Golpayegan, Iran	Iran	Chief of Staff of Office Of the Supreme Leader of Iran
6		Ali Akbar Nategh-Nouri علی‌اکبر ناطق‌نوری	6 October 1944 (age 82)	(Pahlavi Iran) Nur, Iran	Iran	-
7		Seyyed Mohammad Javad Pishvai سید محمد جواد پیشوایی	1944 (age 81–82)	(Pahlavi Iran) Bandar-e Anzali, Iran	Iran	-
8		Mohsin Qara'ati محسن قرائتی	1945 (age 80–81)	(Pahlavi Iran) Kashan, Iran	Iran	-
9		Abdul Hussein Mo'ezzi عبدالحسين معزی	1945 (age 80–81)	(Pahlavi Iran) Tehran, Iran	London, United Kingdom	Representative of Ali Khamenei in England
10		Ahmad Salek احمد سالک	1946 (age 79–80)	(Pahlavi Iran) Isfahan, Iran	Iran	-
11		Seyed Hadi Khamenei سید هادی خامنه‌ای	1947 (age 78–79)	(Pahlavi Iran) Mashhad, Iran	Iran	Younger brother of current Supreme Leader of Iran
12		Mohammad-Taghi Khalaji محمد تقی خلجی	31 March 1948 (age 78)	(Pahlavi Iran) Isfahan, Iran	Iran	Arrested in 2010
13		Rasoul Montajabnia رسول منتجب‌نیا	13 July 1948 (age 78)	(Pahlavi Iran) Shiraz, Iran	Iran	Official Website
14		Hassan Rouhani حسن روحانی	12 November 1948 (age 78)	(Pahlavi Iran) Sorkheh, Iran	Iran	7th President of Iran
15		Subhi al-Tufayli صبحي الطفيلي	1948 (age 77–78)	Brital, Lebanon	Lebanon	Former leader of Hezbollah
16		Mohammad Hassan Rahimian محمد حسن رحیمیان	1948 (age 77–78)	(Pahlavi Iran) Isfahan, Iran	Iran	-
17		Abdolmoghim Nasehi عبدالمقیم ناصحی	March 11, 1949 (age 77)	(Pahlavi Iran) Tehran, Iran	Iran	-
18		Allahshukur Hummet Pashazadeh Allahşükür Hümmət Paşazadə الله شكورحمت باشازاده	26 August 1949 (age 77)	(Azerbaijan Soviet Socialist Republic) Cil, Azerbaijan SSR	Azerbaijan	Current Sheikh-ul-Islam and Grand Mufti of the Caucasus
19		Ali Fallahian علی فلاحیان	23 October 1949 (age 77)	(Pahlavi Iran) Najafabad, Iran	Iran	Second Minister of Intelligence of Iran
20		Mohammad Jafar Montazeri محمدجعفر منتظری	1949 (age 76–77)	(Pahlavi Iran) Qom, Iran	Iran	Current Attorney General of Iran
21		Hadi Ghaffari هادی غفاری	25 June 1950 (age 76)	(Pahlavi Iran) Azarshahr, Iran	Iran	Alleged killer of Amir-Abbas Hoveyda
22		Abdollah Noori عبدالله نوری	1950 (age 75–76)	(Pahlavi Iran) Isfahan, Iran	Iran	-
23		Mohammad Yazbek محمد يزبك	1950 (age 75–76)	Bodai, Lebanon	Lebanon	One of the founders of Hezbollah
24		Kazem Seddiqi کاظم صدیقی	4 March 1951 (age 75)	(Pahlavi Iran) Abhar, Iran	Iran	Current temporary Friday prayer leader in Tehran
25		Syed Jawad Naqvi سید جواد نقوی	5 March 1952 (age 74)	Haripur, Pakistan	Pakistan	Official Website
26		Seyed Mohammad Ali Mosavi سیدمحمدعلی موسوی	1952 (age 73–74)	(Pahlavi Iran) Qom, Iran	Iran	-
27		Seyed Mohammad Hassan Aboutorabi Fard سید محمدحسن ابوترابی‌فرد	30 January 1953 (age 73)	(Pahlavi Iran) Qom, Iran	Iran	-
28		Mahmoud Salavati محمود صلواتی	21 March 1953 (age 73)	(Pahlavi Iran) Khomeyni Shahr, Iran	Iran	-
29		Mohammad Ali Rahmani محمدعلی رحمانی	25 March 1953 (age 73)	(Pahlavi Iran) Quchan, Iran	Iran	-
30		Mohsen Rohami محسن رهامی	24 May 1953 (age 73)	(Pahlavi Iran) Khodabandeh, Iran	Iran	-
31		Naim Qassem نعيم قاسم	1953 (age 72–73)	Kfar Fila, Lebanon	Lebanon	Secretary-General of Hezbollah
32		Majid Ansari مجید انصاری	30 March 1954 (age 72)	(Pahlavi Iran) Khanuk, Iran	Iran	-
33		Ali Qazi Askar علی قاضی عسکر	26 May 1954 (age 72)	(Pahlavi Iran) Isfahan, Iran	Iran	-
34		Abdolvahed Mousavi Lari عبدالواحد موسوی لاری	1954 (age 71–72)	(Pahlavi Iran) Mohr, Iran	Iran	-
35		Hadi Ghabel هادی قابل	27 June 1955 (age 71)	(Pahlavi Iran) Torbat-e Jam, Iran	Iran	-
36		Ali Younesi علی یونسی	26 August 1955 (age 71)	(Pahlavi Iran) Nahavand, Iran	Iran	Fourth Minister of Intelligence in Iran
37		Abdul Mahdi al-Salami عبد المهدي السلامي	1955 (age 70–71)	(Kingdom of Iraq) Karbala, Iraq	Karbala, Iraq	Representative of Ali al-Sistani in Iraq
38		Gholam-Hossein Mohseni-Eje'i غلامحسین محسنی اژه‌ای	29 September 1956 (age 70)	(Pahlavi Iran) Isfahan, Iran	Iran	Chief Justice of Iran
39		Seyyed Abdul-Nabi Mousavi Fard سید عبدالنبی موسوی فرد	1956 (age 69–70)	(Pahlavi Iran) Jahrom, Iran	Iran	Current Representative of the Supreme Leader of Iran in Khuzestan & Friday prayer leader in Ahvaz
40		Jalal al-Din Ali al-Saghir جلال الدين علي الصغير	14 September 1957 (age 69)	(Kingdom of Iraq) Najaf, Iraq	Iraq	-
41		Heydar Moslehi حیدر مصلحی	1957 (age 68–69)	(Pahlavi Iran) Shahreza, Iran	Iran	Sixth Minister of Intelligence in Iran
42		Abdul Fattah Nawab سید عبدالفتاح نواب	1957 (age 68–69)	(Pahlavi Iran) Shahreza, Iran	Iran	-
43		Abbas Amirifar عباس امیری‌فر	1957 (age 68–69)	(Pahlavi Iran) Iran	Iran	-
44		Mohammad-Ali Abtahi محمدعلی ابطحی	29 September 1958 (age 68)	(Pahlavi Iran) Mashhad, Iran	Iran	-
45		Morteza Aghatehrani مرتضی آقاتهرانی	1958 (age 67–68)	(Pahlavi Iran) Isfahan, Iran	Iran	-
46		Ahmad Marvi احمد مروی	1958 (age 67–68)	(Pahlavi Iran) Mashhad, Iran	Iran	-
47		Mohammad Nasser Saghaye-Biria محمدناصر سقای بی‌ریا	1958 (age 67–68)	(Pahlavi Iran) Kermanshah, Iran	Iran	-
48		Abdol Hassan Navab سید ابوالحسن نواب	1958 (age 67–68)	(Pahlavi Iran) Shahreza, Iran	Iran	-
49		Qasem Ravanbakhsh قاسم روانبخش	1958 (age 67–68)	(Pahlavi Iran) Meybod, Iran	Iran	-
50		Mohsen Kadivar محسن کدیور	8 June 1959 (age 67)	(Pahlavi Iran) Fasa, Iran	Iran	Research professor of Islamic Studies at Duke University
51		Asgar Dirbaz عسگر دیرباز	1959 (age 66–67)	(Pahlavi Iran) Mianeh, Iran	Iran	-
52		Mohammad Sadegh Salehimanesh محمدصادق صالحی‌منش	1959 (age 66–67)	(Pahlavi Iran) Yazd, Iran	Iran	-
53		Ali Banaei علی بنایی	1959 (age 66–67)	(Pahlavi Iran) Qom, Iran	Iran	-
54		Mostafa Pourmohammadi مصطفی پورمحمدی	9 March 1960 (age 66)	(Pahlavi Iran) Qom, Iran	Iran	Official Website
55		Seyed Hassan Eslami Ardakani سید حسن اسلامی اردکانی	23 December 1960 (age 65)	(First Republic of Iraq) Karbala, Iraq	Iran	-
56		Seyed Mohammad Reza Mirtajodini سید محمدرضا میرتاج‌الدینی	30 December 1960 (age 65)	(Pahlavi Iran) Tabriz, Iran	Iran	-
57		Mohsen Qomi محسن قمی	1960 (age 65–66)	(Pahlavi Iran) Pakdasht, Iran	Iran	Current member of the Assembly of Experts
58		Habib Boromand Dashghapu حبیب برومند داشقاپو	21 March 1961 (age 65)	(Pahlavi Iran) Germi, Iran	Iran	-
59		Seyed Mohammad Bagher Kharazi سید محمدباقر خرازی	26 June 1961 (age 65)	(Pahlavi Iran) Qom, Iran	Iran	-
60		Ahmad Mazani احمد مازنی	1961 (age 64–65)	(Pahlavi Iran) Bandar-e Gaz, Iran	Iran	-
61		Seyed Mir Ghesmat Mosavi Asl سید میرقسمت موسوی‌اصل	1961 (age 64–65)	(Pahlavi Iran) Germi, Iran	Iran	-
62		al-Sayyid Mustafa al-Musawi al-Qazwini السيد مصطفى الموسوي القزويني	1961 (age 64–65)	(First Republic of Iraq) Karbala, Iraq	Orange County, United States of America	-
63		Syed Fida Hussain Bukhari سید فدا حسین بخاری	1961 (age 64–65)	Punjab, Pakistan	United Kingdom	-
64		Mansour Leghaei منصور لقائى	14 May 1962 (age 64)	(Pahlavi Iran) Abadan, Iran	Sydney, Australia	Official Website
65		Seyed Mehdi Ghoreishi سید مهدی قریشی	1963 (age 62–63)	(Pahlavi Iran) Urmia, Iran	Iran	Current Representative of the Supreme Leader of Iran in West Azerbaijan and Friday Prayer leader in Urmia
66		Ahmad Vaezi احمد واعظی	1963 (age 62–63)	(Pahlavi Iran) Rey, Iran	Iran	-
67		Hossein Taeb حسین تائب	1963 (age 62–63)	(Pahlavi Iran) Tehran, Iran	Iran	Current head of the IRGC's Intelligence Organisation
68		Mojtaba Zonnour مجتبی ذوالنور	1963 (age 62–63)	(Pahlavi Iran) Malayer, Iran	Iran	-
69		Hamid Hawali Shahriari حمید حوالی شهریاری	1963 (age 62–63)	(Pahlavi Iran) Tehran, Iran	Iran	-
70		Rasul Jafarian رسول جعفریان	30 June 1964 (age 62)	(Pahlavi Iran) Khvorasgan, Iran	Iran	Official Website
71		al-Sayyid Hassan al-Musawi al-Qazwini السيد حسن الموسوي القزويني	16 October 1964 (age 62)	(First Republic of Iraq) Karbala, Iraq	Dearborn Heights, United States of America	Official Website
72		Alireza Qaeminia علیرضا قائمی‌نیا	1964 (age 61–62)	(Pahlavi Iran) Urmia, Iran	Iran	-
73		Alireza Salimi علیرضا سلیمی	1964 (age 61–62)	(Pahlavi Iran) Mahallat County, Iran	Iran	-
74		Nasrollah Pejmanfar نصرالله پژمان‌فر	1964 (age 61–62)	(Pahlavi Iran) Tehran, Iran	Iran	-
75		Seyed Mohammad Vaez Mousavi سید محمد واعظ موسوی	1964 (age 61–62)	(Pahlavi Iran) Shabestar, Iran	Iran	Official Website
76		Alireza Panahian علیرضا پناهیان	17 April 1965 (age 61)	(Pahlavi Iran) Tehran, Iran	Iran	Official Website
77		Ali Salman Ahmed Salman علي سلمان أحمد سلمان	30 October 1965 (age 61)	Bilad Al Qadeem, Bahrain	Bahrain	Currently facing life in prison
78		Mohammad Ali Shomali محمدعلى شمالى	22 December 1965 (age 60)	(Pahlavi Iran) Tehran, Iran	Iran	-
79		Muhammad Javad Haj Ali Akbari محمدجواد حاج‌علی‌اکبری	1965 (age 60–61)	(Pahlavi Iran) Damavand, Iran	Iran	One of the Temporary Friday Prayer leaders in Tehran
80		Seyyed Mostafa Hosseini Khamenei سید مصطفی حسینی خامنه‌ای	1965 (age 60–61)	(Pahlavi Iran) Mashhad, Iran	Iran	Eldest son of the late Supreme Leader in Iran (Ali Khamenei)
81		Mohammad Hassan Ghadrdan Gharamaleki محمد حسن قدردان قراملکی	1965 (age 60–61)	(Pahlavi Iran) Tabriz, Iran	Iran	-
82		Seyed Ahmad Reza Shahrokhi سید احمدرضا شاهرخی	1966 (age 59–60)	(Pahlavi Iran) Khorramabad, Iran	Iran	Current Representative of the Supreme Leader of Iran in Lorestan & Friday Prayer leader in Khorramabad
83		Syed Kalbe Jawad Naqvi سید کلب جواد نقوی	1966 (age 59–60)	Lucknow, India	India	-
84		Mohammad Hadi Mofatteh محمدهادى مفتح	9 April 1967 (age 59)	Hamburg, Germany	Hamburg, Germany	Head of Islamic Centre Hamburg
85		Mir Ahmad Reza Hajati میراحمدرضا حاجتی	1967 (age 58–59)	(Pahlavi Iran) Masjed Soleyman, Iran	Iran	-
86		Ali Shirazi علی شیرازی	22 November 1969 (age 56)	(Pahlavi Iran) Rafsanjan, Iran	Iran	-
87		Seyed Sajjad Izdehi سید سجاد ایزدهی	1970 (age 55–56)	(Pahlavi Iran) Mazandaran, Iran	Iran	-
88		Sayyid Ammar al-Hakim سید عمار الحكيم	1971 (age 54–55)	(Ba'athist Iraq) Najaf, Iraq	Iraq	Official Website
89		Mohammad Bagheri محمد باقری	1971 (age 54–55)	(Ba'athist Iraq) Najaf, Iraq	Iran	-
90		Seyed Kazem Seyed Bagheri سید کاظم سیدباقری	1971 (age 54–55)	(Pahlavi Iran) Kerman, Iran	Iran	-
91		Sayyed Hassan Khomeini سيد حسن خمينی	23 July 1972 (age 54)	(Pahlavi Iran) Qom, Iran	Iran	Grandson of the First Supreme Leader of Iran (Ruhollah Khomeini) Official Website
92		Reza Nouri رضا نوری	1972 (age 53–54)	(Pahlavi Iran) Bojnord, Iran	Iran	-
93		Ruhollah Beigi Eilanlu روح‌الله بیگی ئیلانلو	1973 (age 52–53)	(Pahlavi Iran) Miandoab, Iran	Iran	-
94		Qais Hadi Sayyid Hassan al-Khazali قيس هادي سيد حسن الخزعلي	20 June 1974 (age 52)	(Ba'athist Iraq) Sadr City, Iraq	Iraq	-
95		al-Sayyid Muqtada al-Sadr السید مقتدى الصدر	4 August 1974 (age 52)	(Ba'athist Iraq) Najaf, Iraq	Iraq	Leader of the Sadrist Movement
96		Seyed Masoud Hosseini Khamenei سید مسعود حسینی خامنه‌ای	1974 (age 51–52)	(Pahlavi Iran) Mashhad, Iran	Iran	Son of late Supreme Leader of Iran (Ali Khamenei)
97		Hassan Namazi حسن نمازی	1975 (age 50–51)	(Pahlavi Iran) Qom, Iran	Iran	-
98		Syed Ali Raza Rizvi سيد على رضا رضوى	1976 (age 49–50)	Lahore, Pakistan	London, United Kingdom	-
99		Seyed Abbas Mousavi Motlagh سید عباس موسوی مطلق	20 January 1977 (age 49)	(Pahlavi Iran) Dorud, Iran	Iran	Official Website
100		al-Sayyid Mohammad al-Mahdi al-Husseini al-Modaressi السید محمد المهدي الحسيني المدرسي	1977 (age 48–49)	Kuwait	United States of America	Official Website
101		Mohammad Qomi محمد قمی	1980 (age 45–46)	(Pahlavi Iran) Qom, Iran	Iran	-
102		Syed Ali Nasir Saeed Abaqati سید علی ناصر سعيد عبقاتی	Unknown?	Lucknow, India	India	-
103		Syed Hamid al-Hassan سید حمید الحسن	Unknown?	Lucknow, India	Lucknow, India	-
104		Taha طه	Unknown?	Iran	Canada	First openly queer Shia cleric

== Deceased ==
This is a list of hujjatul Islams that have died. The list is arranged in descending order of their date of passing.

No	Image	Name	Year of birth CE	Year of death CE	Place of birth	Place of death	Notes
1		Syed Ahmad Musavi Hindi سيد احمد موسوى هندى	1800	1869 (aged 68–69)	Kintoor, India	(Qajar Iran) Khomeyn, Iran	Paternal Grandfather of Ruhollah Khomeini
2		Mirza Hasan Tahirzadeh میرزا حسن طاهرزاده	30 May 1837	21 June 1893 (aged 56)	Shusha, Russian Empire	Tbilisi, Russian Empire	Fourth Sheikh ul-Islam of the Caucasus
3		Mirza Reza Kermani میرزا رضا کرمانی	1854	10 August 1896 (aged 41–42)	(Qajar Iran) Kerman, Iran	(Qajar Iran) Tehran, Iran	Assassinated Nasser al-Din Shah Qajar Was executed by hanging.
4		Akhundzadeh Abd al-Salam آخونــدزاده عبدالســلام	13 January 1843	18 November 1907 (aged 64)	Salyan, Russian Empire	Tbilisi, Russian Empire	Fifth Sheikh ul-Islam of the Caucasus
5		Seyed Jamalodin Vaeiz Esfahani سید جمال‌الدین واعظ اصفهانی	1862	4 June 1908 (aged 45–46)	(Qajar Iran) Hamadan, Iran	(Qajar Iran) Tehran, Iran	Killed by a hitman ordered by Mohammad Ali Shah Qajar
6		Mirza Ali Aqa Tabrizi میرزا علی‌آقا تبریزی	19 January 1861	31 December 1911 (aged 50)	(Qajar Iran) Tabriz, Iran	(Qajar Iran) Tabriz, Iran	-
7		Sheikh Mohammad Khiabani شیخ محمد خیابانی	1879	1920 (aged 40–41)	(Qajar Iran) Khameneh, Iran	(Qajar Iran) Tabriz, Iran	-
8		Mohammad Pishnamaz Zadeh محمد پیشنماززاده	15 May 1853	1937 (aged 83–84)	Ganja, Russian Empire	Ganja, Soviet Union	Seventh Sheikh ul-Islam of the Caucasus
9		Bachir Moustafa Hammoud بشیر مصطفی حمود	1906	1945 (aged 38–39)	Choukine, Lebanon	Choukine, Lebanon	-
10		Ahmad Rida أحمد رضا	1872	1953 (aged 80–81)	(Lebanon) Nabatieh, Ottoman Syria	Nabatieh, Lebanon	-
11		Seyed Mojtaba Mir-Lohi سيد مجتبی میرلوحی	1924	18 January 1956 (aged 31–32)	(Qajar Iran) Tehran, Iran	(Pahlavi Iran) Tehran, Iran	Founder of Fada'iyan-e Islam Was executed by firing squad
12		Ahmed Aref El-Zein أحمد عارف الزين	10 July 1884	13 October 1960 (aged 76)	Shhur, Lebanon	(Pahlavi Iran) Khorasan, Iran	-
13		Seyed Esmail Balhki سید اسماعیل بلخی	1918	14 July 1968 (aged 49–50)	Balkhab, Afghanistan	Kabul, Afghanistan	-
14		Seyed Mostafa Khomeini سید مصطفی خمینی	12 December 1930	23 October 1977 (aged 46)	(Pahlavi Iran) Qom, Iran	(Ba'athist Iraq) Najaf, Iraq	Son of first Supreme Leader of Iran, Ruhollah Khomeini.
15		Muhammad Latif Ansari محمد لطیف انصاری	30 September 1887	1979 (aged 91–92)	(British Raj) British India	Kenya	-
16		Abbas Mohammad Montazeri عباس محمد منتظری	21 March 1944	28 June 1981 (aged 37)	(Pahlavi Iran) Najafabad, Iran	Tehran, Iran	Assassinated by Mujahideen-e Khalq, alongside Mohammad Beheshti and 31 others
17		Mohammad-Javad Bahonar محمدجواد باهنر	5 September 1933	30 August 1981 (aged 47)	(Pahlavi Iran) Kerman, Iran	Tehran, Iran	Assassinated by Mujahideen-e Khalq
18		Habibollah Ashouri حبیب‌الله آشوری	1936	18 September 1981 (aged 44–45)	(Pahlavi Iran) Gonabad, Iran	Tehran, Iran	Executed by firing squad
19		Seyed Abdolkarim Hasheminejad سید عبدالکریم هاشمی‌نژاد	1932	30 September 1981 (aged 48–49)	(Pahlavi Iran) Behshahr, Iran	Mashhad, Iran	Assassinated by Mujahideen-e Khalq
20		Seyed Hassan Emami سید حسن امامی	1903	1981 (aged 77–78)	(Pahlavi Iran) Tehran, Iran	Lausanne, Switzerland	Fled Iran after the Iranian Revolution, was connected with the Shah
21		Syed Arif Hussain al-Hussaini سید عارف حسين الحسينى	25 November 1946	5 August 1988 (aged 41)	(British Raj) Parachinar, India	Peshawar, Pakistan	-
22		Sayyid Abbas al-Musawi سید عباس الموسوي	26 October 1952	16 February 1992 (aged 39)	Al-Nabi Shayth, Lebanon	Nabatieh Governorate, Lebanon	Co-founder of Hezbollah. Assassinated by Israel
23		Seyyed Ahmad Khomeini سید احمد خمینی	14 March 1946	17 March 1995 (aged 49)	(Pahlavi Iran) Qom, Iran	Tehran, Iran	Son of first Supreme Leader of Iran, Ruhollah Khomeini
24		Syed Hassan Naqvi سید حسن نقوى	1935	18 October 1996 (aged 60–61)	(British Raj) Lucknow, India	Lucknow, India	-
25		Syed Ali Akhtar Rizvi سید علی اختر رضوی	19 September 1948	10 February 2002 (aged 53)	(British Raj) Bihar, India	Bihar, India	-
26		Syed Saeed Akhtar Rizvi سيد سعيد اختر رضوي	5 January 1927	20 June 2002 (aged 75)	(British Raj) Bihar, India	Dar es Salaam, Tanzania	-
27		al-Sayyid Abd al-Majid al-Musawi al-Khoei السید عبد المجيد الموسوي الخوئي	16 August 1962	10 April 2003 (aged 40)	(First Republic of Iraq) Najaf, Iraq	Najaf, Iraq	-
28		Ahmed al-Waeli al-Laithi al-Kinani أحمد الوائلي الليثي الكناني	1928	14 July 2003 (aged 74–75)	(Kingdom of Iraq) Najaf, Iraq	Kadhimiya, Iraq	Known for his presentation style in Iraq
29		Allama Hassan Turabi علامہ حسن ترابی	1953	14 July 2006 (aged 52–53)	Shigar, Pakistan	Karachi, Pakistan	-
30		Abdul Amir al-Jamri عبدالأمير الجمري	1 March 1938	18 December 2006 (aged 68)	Bani Jamra, Bahrain	Manama, Bahrain	-
31		Ali Davani علی دوانی	27 September 1929	8 January 2007 (aged 77)	(Pahlavi Iran) Davan, Iran	Tehran, Iran	-
32		Sayyid Abd al-Aziz al-Hakim سید عبد العزيز الحكيم	1952	26 August 2009 (aged 56–57)	(Kingdom of Iraq) Najaf, Iraq	Tehran, Iran	66th Prime Minister of Iraq
33		Ali Golzadeh Ghafouri علی گلزاده غفوری	14 May 1923	1 January 2010 (aged 86)	(Pahlavi Iran) Qazvin, Iran	Tehran, Iran	-
34		Abdullah al-Dahdouh عبد الله الدهدوه	1966	12 March 2012 (aged 45–46)	Tangier, Morocco	Brussels, Belgium	An ex-Sunni convert to Shia Islam, was murdered by Moroccan Sunnis in Belgium.
35		Ahmad Ghabel احمد قابل	1954	October 22, 2012 (aged 57–58)	(Pahlavi Iran) Torbat-e Jam, Iran	Mashhad, Iran	Sentenced to prison, died while under hospital arrest
36		Hassan bin Mohammad bin Shehata bin Musa al-Anani حسن بن محمد بن شحاتة بن موسى العناني	10 November 1946	23 June 2013 (aged 66)	Sharqia Governorate, Egypt	Giza Governorate, Egypt	An ex-Sunni scholar who converted to Shia Islam, was murdered by an angry mob of Sunnis in front of his home in Egypt alongside 4 others.
37		Muhammad Musa Shariefi محمد موسی شریفی	1942	11 December 2013 (aged 70–71)	(British Raj) Kargil, India	Kargil, India	-
38		Mirza Mohammed Athar میرزا محمد اظر	1 January 1937	26 February 2016 (aged 79)	(British Raj) Lucknow, India	New Delhi, India	-
39		Jafar Shojouni جعفر شجونی	1932	6 November 2016 (aged 83–84)	(Pahlavi Iran) Fuman, Iran	Tehran, Iran	
40		Qasim Umar Sokoto قاسم عمر سوکوتو	Unknown?	5 February 2018	Sokoto, Nigeria	Sokoto, Nigeria	-
41		Seyyed Mehdi Tabatabaei Shirazi سید مهدی طباطبایی شیرازی	21 March 1936	17 May 2018 (aged 82)	(Pahlavi Iran) Rafsanjan, Iran	Tehran, Iran	
42		Ahmad Ahmadi احمد احمدی	6 September 1933	8 June 2018 (aged 84)	(Pahlavi Iran) Malayer, Iran	Tehran, Iran	-
43		Seyed Ali Akbar Mousavi Hosseini سید علی‌اکبر موسوی حسینی	1939	21 June 2018 (aged 78–79)	(Pahlavi Iran) Tehran, Iran	Tehran, Iran	-
44		Hussayn bin al-Haj Muhammad Qasim al-Kurani al-Yateri al-Ameli حسين بن الحاج محمد قاسم الكوراني الياطري العاملي	1955	12 September 2019 (aged 63–64)	Yater, Lebanon	Beirut, Lebanon	-
45		Talib Jauhari طالب جوہری	27 August 1929	21 June 2020 (aged 90)	(British Raj) Patna, India	Karachi, Pakistan	-
46		Ruhollah Hosseinian روح الله حسینیان	5 March 1956	25 August 2020 (aged 64)	(Pahlavi Iran) Shiraz, Iran	Tehran, Iran	-
47		Syed Kalbe Sadiq Naqvi سید کلب صادق نقوی	22 June 1939	24 November 2020 (aged 81)	(British Raj) Lucknow, India	Lucknow, India	-
48		Seyed Mohammad Ali Shahidi Mahallati سید محمد علی شهیدی محلاتی	9 July 1949	28 November 2020 (aged 71)	(Pahlavi Iran) Mahallat, Iran	Tehran, Iran	-
49		Seyyed Ali Akbar Mohtashamipur سید علی‌اکبر محتشمی‌پور	August 30, 1947	7 June 2021 (aged 73)	(Pahlavi Iran) Tehran, Iran	Tehran, Iran	
50		Abdillahi Nassir عبداللهی ناصر	1 June 1932	11 January 2022 (aged 89)	Mombasa, Kenya	Mombasa, Kenya	-
51		Agha Syed Hamid Ali Shah Moosavi آغا سید حامد علی شاہ موسوی	12 May 1930	25 July 2022 (aged 92)	(British Raj) Tharparkar, British India	Islamabad, Pakistan	-
52		Mohammad Reza Ashtiani Araghi محمد رضا آشتیانی عراقی	1940	23 June 2023 (aged 82–83)	(Pahlavi Iran) Qom, Iran	Iran	-
53		Hassan Sane'i حسن صانعی	1934	21 July 2023 (aged 88–89)	(Pahlavi Iran) Nikabad, Iran	Iran	-
54		Sayyid Hassan Nasrallah سید حسن نصرالله	31 August 1960	27 September 2024 (aged 64)	Bourj Hammoud, Lebanon	Beirut, Lebanon	Former Leader of Hezbollah until 2024, after being assassinated by Israel.
55		Nabil Qaouk نبيل قاووق	20 May 1964	28 September 2024 (aged 60)	Ebba, Lebanon	Dahieh, Lebanon	Former deputy head of Hezbollah's executive council. Assassinated by Israel.
56		Sayyid Hashem Safieddine سید هاشم صفي الدين	1964	3 October 2024 (aged 59–60)	Deir Qanoun En Nahr, Lebanon	Dahieh, Lebanon	Assassinated by Israel
57		Mohammad Esmail Shooshtari محمداسماعیل شوشتری	1949	21 November 2024 (aged 74–75)	(Pahlavi Iran) Quchan, Iran	Iran	-
58		Mohammad Nasser Saghaye-Biria محمدناصر سقای بی‌ریا	22 January 1959	14 January 2025 (aged 65)	(Pahlavi Iran) Kermanshah, Iran	Iran	-
59		Mohammad Moghiseh محمد مقیسه	1956	18 January 2025 (aged 68–69)	(Pahlavi Iran) Sabzevar, Iran	Tehran, Iran	Assassinated and killed by gunshot.
60		Ali Razini علی رازینی	23 May 1953	18 January 2025 (aged 71)	(Pahlavi Iran) Razan, Iran	Tehran, Iran	Assassinated and killed by gunshot.

== See also ==
- List of Ayatollahs
- List of current Maraji
- List of deceased Maraji
- List of provincial representatives appointed by Supreme Leader of Iran
- List of Tehran's Friday Prayer Imams
