= Seyyed Ali Shafiei =

Iranian Ayatollah (1940–2025)

Ayatollah; Seyyed; Ali Shafiei
- سید علی شفیعی
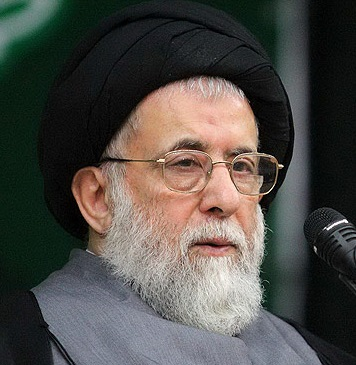

Member of the Assembly of Experts
- In office 21 February 1991 – 28 December 2025
- Constituency: Khuzestan Province

Personal details
- Born: 12 August 1940 Dezful, Iran
- Died: 28 December 2025 (aged 85)
- Resting place: Ahvaz

Seyyed Ali Shafiei (Persian: سید علی شفیعی; 12 August 1940 – 28 December 2025) was an Iranian Twelver Shia scholar, who was a member of Assembly of Experts from Khuzestan province. He was the son of Seyyed Mohammad Reza (Shafiei) who was from the known Shia Islamic scholars of Khuzestan. Seyyed Ali Shafiei commenced his education from Maktabkhaneh (Kuttab), and began to peruse Quran and Islamic issues. Afterwards, he entered a new school. Later on, he went to educate Hawzah lessons in the city of Ahwaz. Then, Seyyed-Ali departed to the Seminary of Najaf in Iraq. After Najaf, he came back to Ahwaz and was appointed the imam of Jama'ah in Ahwaz and commenced to promote Islamic rulings.

Seyyed Ali who reached the (Islamic) scientific degree of Ijtihad, used to teach Islamic-science and ... for the members of Islamic Revolutionary Guard Corps (IRGC) and other organizations; and was also active in combating the regime of the Shah. This Shia ayatollah, was appointed by the first/former supreme leader of Iran, Seyyed Ruhollah Khomeini in a 17-member-mission to settle the affairs of Ahwaz, after the Islamic revolution of Iran. For many years, he was the "Imam of Jama'ah" at the mosque of Shafiei in the center of Ahwaz which is considered among the oldest mosques of the city. Shafiei compiled several works, including but not limited to:

- Fatimah Yadeh Nabowat
- Sharhe Mokhtasare Zendeganie Allameh Feize Kashani
- Az Gushe Va Kenare Tarikh (Barresie Safhei Az Zendegie Emam Hassan Mojtaba)
- Dars-haee Az Jahade Eslami
- Velayate Por Foruqe Ali
- Majlese Shouraye Eslami Va Tasvibe Ahkame Sanavieh
- Taqvime Sa'ate Shareie Ostane Khuzestan
- Namaz Darse Zendegi
- Chahar Goftar
- Marjaeiate Ayatollah Khamenei
- Raveshe Feqhi Va Osulie Sheikhe Azame Ansari
- Vahdate Marjaeiat Va Rahbari
- Nezame Velayate Faqih
- Moqadamate Akhlaqe Eslami
- Al-Ehtekar

Shafiei died on 28 December 2025 at the age of 85.

== Teachers ==
Seyyed Ali Shafiei who was active in the fields of research, teaching, authorship, lecturing and Tafsir (interpretation) of the Qur'an, applied several known teachers and scholars during his studies period, including but not limited to:

- Mohammad-Ali Ardebili
- Kazem Tabrizi
- Moslem Malakouti
- Madani Tabrizi
- Qolam-Reza Saeidi Kashmari
- Seyyed Mohammad-Jafar Mosavi Moravej
- Seyyed Abu al-Qasim al-Khoei
- Hakim
- Seyyed Ruhollah Khomeini
- Baqer Zanjani
- Mohammad-Ali Moezi Dezfuli
- Seyyed Ali Behbahani

== See also ==
- Assembly of Experts
- Mohammad Ali Mousavi Jazayeri
- Sayyid Abdul-Nabi Mousavi Fard
