= Book of the year =

Book of the year may refer to:

== In the United Kingdom ==
- Book of the year, British Book Awards in several categories for UK writers
- Scottish Book of the Year, one of the Saltire Society Literary Awards
- Waterstones Book of the Year, a book selected each year by Waterstones, the bookseller
- William Hill Sports Book of the Year, an annual British sports writing award
- Wales Book of the Year, a Welsh literary award
- Financial Times Business Book of the Year Award, an annual award for the best book about business
- The Sunday Express Book of the Year, a lucrative UK award that ran 1987 to 1993
- Foyles Book of the Year, awards given by the British bookseller Foyles, since 2017
- Book of the year, the overall winner of the Costa Book Awards, a UK literary award that ran from 1971 to 2022
- Scottish Mortgage Investment Trust Book of the Year, Scottish Mortgage Investment Trust Book Awards that ran from 1972 to 2013
- Lancashire Book of the Year, awards for children's books ran since 1987 by Lancashire County Council's library service, England

== In Australia ==
- Book of the year, Australian Book Industry Awards in several categories
- Children's book of the year, Children's Book Council of Australia awards for several categories of books for children.
- ACT Book of the Year, an annual prize given to an author from the Australian Capital Territory.

== In Iran ==
- Iran's Book of the Year Awards, prestigious book awards in Iran
- Student Book of the Year

== International ==
- Book of the year, also known as a Christy Award organised by the Evangelical Christian Publishers Association

== See also ==
- List of literary awards
