= Mir Ahmad Reza Hajati =

Iranian cleric

Ayatollah Mir Ahmad Reza Hajati
- میراحمدرضا حاجتی
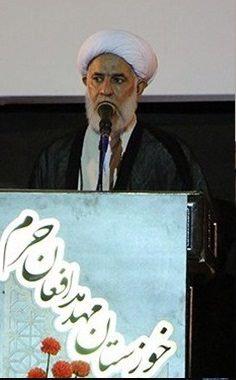

Personal life
- Born: 1967 (age 58–59) Masjed Soleyman, Iran

Religious life
- Religion: Islam
- Denomination: Shi'a
- School: Twelver

Mir Ahmad Reza Hajati (Farsi: میراحمدرضا حاجتی) who is famous as "Ayatollah-Hajati", "Hujjat al-Islam Hajati" or "Hujjatul-Islam wal Muslimin Hajati" is one of Ahwaz temporary Imam Jom'ah (Imam of Friday). He was born in 1967 in Masjed Soleyman; his father's name is Hajat Morad. Ayatollah Hajati is the author of the book "Asr (era) of Imam Khomeini" which is considered/taught as a reference book in some universities, and it has been translated in 3 prominent languages of the world; this expresses the personality of the founder of the Islamic revolution.

He is regarded as a prominent lecturer/preacher in the country (Iran); he has traveled to difference countries of the world in order to promote Islam. Mir Ahmad Reza Hajati also has been appointed as the special representative in Bakhtiari and Lur areas by Mousavi Jazayeri (Iranian supreme leader's agent in Khuzestan province).

== See also ==
- Seyyed Mohammad Ali Mousavi Jazayeri
- Seyyed Abdul-Nabi Mousavi Fard
- Mohsen Heidari Alekasir
- Abdul Karim Farhani
- Abbas Ka'bi
