= Muhammad Bayyumi Mahran =

Egyptian scholar and historian

Muhammad Bayyumi Mahran was an Egyptian scholar and professor of history at Alexandria University. He won Iranian Book of the Year Award for his book Historical studies from the Quoran.

== Works ==
- Bilād al-Shām, 1990
- Dirāsāt tārīẖiyyaẗ min al-Qurʼān al-Karīm
- Fī riḥāb al-Nabī wa-āl baytihi al-ṭāhirīn
- Historical studies from the Qur'an
- Imām ʻAlī ibn Abī Ṭālib
- Madīnat Jurash al-atharīyah wa-qabīlat al-ʻAwāsij bayna al-māḍī wa-al-ḥāḍir
- Miṣr wa-al-Sharq al-Adná al-qadīm
- Sayyidah Fāṭimah al-Zahrā
- Sīrah al-Nabawīyah al-sharīfah
- Studies in ancient history of the Ara
