= Abbaszadeh =

Abbaszadeh is a surname. Notable people with the surname include:

- Mahdi Abbaszadeh, Iranian philosopher and professor
- Maleyka Abbaszadeh (born 1953), Azerbaijani politician
- Mohammad Abbaszadeh (born 1990), Iranian footballer
