= IICT =

IICT may refer to:

- Indian Institute of Chemical Technology
- Research Institute for Islamic Culture and Thought
