= Encyclopedia of Imam Ali =

13-volume encyclopedia on the life of the first Imam in Shia

- Editor: Ali Akbar Rashad
- Author: Various scholars
- Original title: دانشنامه امام علی ع
- Language: Persian
- Subject: Imam Ali, Shia Islam, Islamic studies
- Genre: Reference work
- Publisher: Islamic Research Institute for Culture and Thought
- Publication date: 2008
- Publication place: Iran
- Media type: Print, Online
- Pages: 13 volumes

The Encyclopedia of Imam Ali (Persian: دانشنامه امام علی ع) is a Persian encyclopedia about Imam Ali (the first Imam in Shia) studies that was published in 13 volumes. The editor-in-chief is Ali Akbar Rashad. This encyclopedia was published by the publishing organization of the "Islamic Research Institute for Culture and Thought".

== Gallery ==
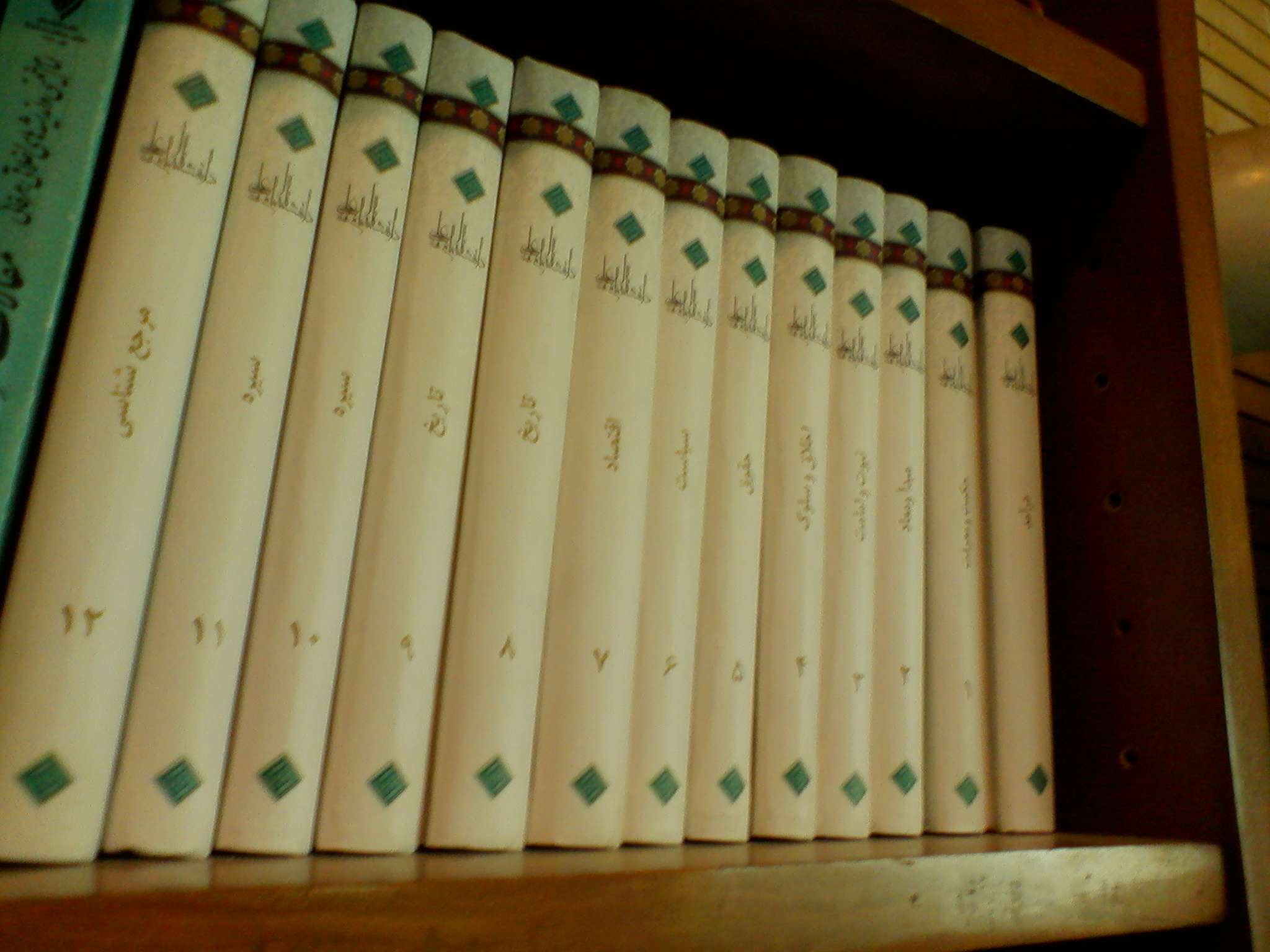

== See also ==
- Umdat al-Talib
