= Abolghasem =

Name list

Abolghasem or Abolqasem is an Iranian given name. Notable people with this name include:

- Abolghasem Alidoust, Iranian legal scholar
- Abol-Ghasem Kashani (1882–1962), Iranian politician and ayatollah
- Abolghasem Khazali (1925–2015), Iranian politician and cleric
- Abolghasem Mozaffari (born 1967), Iranian military person
- Abolghasem Orouji (born 1989), Iranian futsal player
- Abolghasem Sakhdari (fl. 1948), Iranian wrestler
- Abolghasem Sarhaddizadeh (1945–2020), Iranian politician
- Abolghasem Wafi Yazdi (born 1935), Iranian Shia cleric

== Abolqasem ==
- Abolqasem Lahouti (1887–1957), Persian poet
- Abolqasem Najm (1892–1981), Iranian politician
- Abolqasem Naser ol-Molk (1856–1927), Persian politician
- Abolqasem Salavati (born 1976), Iranian judge
- Abolqasem Talebi (born 1961), Iranian film director
