= Nasser Yousefi =

Iranian writer

- ناصر یوسفی
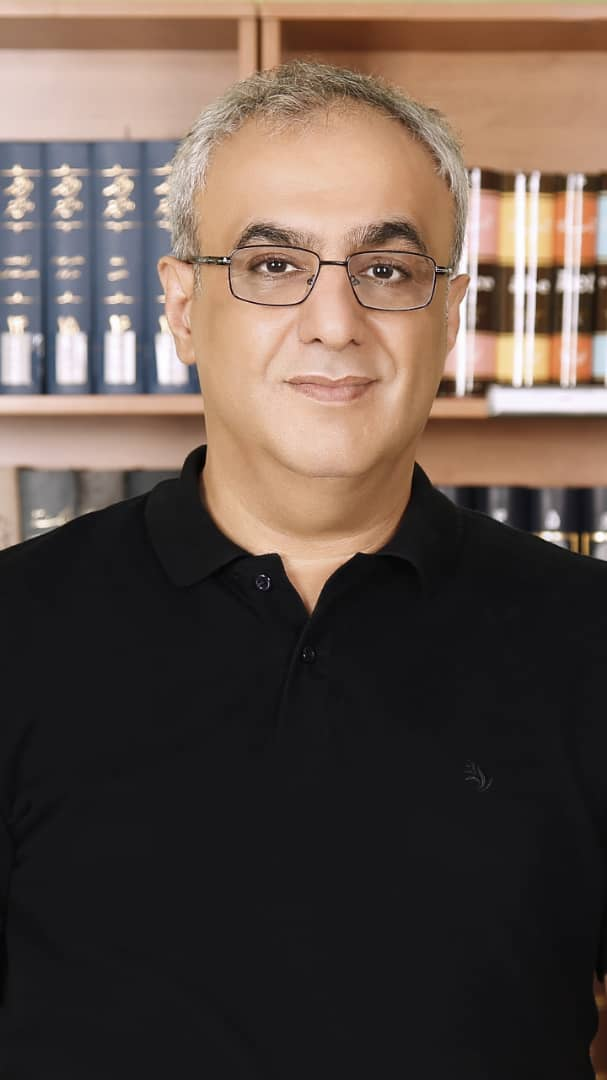
- Born: 1967 (age 58–59)
- Occupation: children's writer
- Writing career
- Notable awards: Iran's Book of the Season

Nasser Yousefi (Persian: ناصر یوسفی; born 1967) is an Iranian writer and novelist. He is a recipient of several national and international awards including Iran's Book of the Year and Iranian Best Children's Book Award.

Nasser Yousefi is a children's author, child psychologist, and specialist in humanistic education.

Over the past three decades, Yousefi has also been an active advocate for children's rights, playing a role in various NGOs. He has also collaborated with international organizations like UNICEF, UNESCO, UNHCR, and the World Population Council and served as a consultant to UNICEF on Early Childhood Education and Development.

After three decades of work in Iran, Yousefi and his family migrated to Canada.

In addition to his storybooks, Yousefi has published research papers and articles on humanistic education in Canadian journals.

== Books ==
- Yasaman and Souvenir
- Cook-a-doodle-do; It's Morning
- Yasaman's Sneakers
- The Apple Tree
- The Special Day
- Yasaman and the Chicks
- Moon-Brow
- Turning Green (English version published 2021)
- Yellow apple taste
- Ashi Mashi the little birdie

== See also ==
- Persian literature
