= The Fertility Transition in Iran =

2009 book by Meimanat Hosseini-Chavoshi, Peter McDonald and Mohammad Jalal Abbasi-Shavazi

The Fertility Transition in Iran: Revolution and Reproduction
- Authors: Meimanat Hosseini-Chavoshi; Peter McDonald; Mohammad Jalal Abbasi-Shavazi
- Language: English
- Subject: Demographics of Iran
- Publisher: Springer Publishing
- Publication date: 2009
- Media type: Print (Hardcover)
- Pages: XXIV, 195 pp.
- ISBN: 978-90-481-3197-6

The Fertility Transition in Iran: Revolution and Reproduction is a 2009 book by Meimanat Hosseini-Chavoshi, Peter McDonald and Mohammad Jalal Abbasi-Shavazi in which the authors examine the fertility rate changes in the Islamic Republic of Iran. The book was awarded Iran's Book of the Year Award.
