= Gertrude Nye Dorry =

Iranian-American linguist

- Born: 1908; Boston, Massachusetts, U.S.
- Died: October 25, 2004 (aged 95–96); Wareham, Massachusetts, U.S.
- Education: University of Michigan (PhD), University of New Hampshire (BA)
- Spouse: Mohammad B. Dorry
- Scientific career
- Thesis: The Phonemes and Morphemes of Modern Persian: A Descriptive Study (1955)

Gertrude Elizabeth Nye Dorry (1908–2004) was an American linguist, author and Peace Corps Educator.

Nye was raised in the United States. She spent much of her adult life in Iran. Early in her life she was a school teacher in New Hampshire. Later while at the University of Michigan she met a man from Iran, and after their marriage they moved to Iran in 1955. She was Peace Corps Project Manager for Iran from 1966-1969.

She received the Iranian Royal Book of the Year Award from Shah of Iran for writing English teaching books for Iranian students.

== Books ==
- Games for second language learning, McGraw-Hill, 1966
