= Seyed Hossein Mir-Moezi =

Iranian economist

- Known for: works on Islamic economics
- Scientific career
- Fields: Islamic economics
- Institutions: Research Institute for Islamic Culture and Thought

Seyed Hossein Mir-Moezi is an Iranian cleric and economist and associate professor of Islamic economics at the Research Institute for Islamic Culture and Thought. He is known for his works on Islamic economics.

== Awards ==
He is a recipient of the Iranian Book of the Year Award for his book titled Riba: Riba's History, Riba in Koran and Sunnah, Varieties of Riba and its Escape Routes.

== Works ==
- Islamic Economic System
- Riba: Riba's History, Riba in Koran and Sunnah, Varieties of Riba and its Escape Routes
- Money and Monetary Systems
- Islam and Economic Challenges
- Macroeconomics: An Islamic Perspective
- Philosophy of Economics
- Beiʼol khiar from the viewpoint of Islamic jurisprudence and economics
