= Mohammad Arab-Salehi =

Iranian philosopher

- Born: 1963
- Education: Qom University (PhD)
- Known for: works on New Muʿtazila
- Awards: Iranian Book of the Season Award
- Scientific career
- Fields: Islamic philosophy
- Institutions: Research Institute for Islamic Culture and Thought

Mohammad Arab-Salehi (born 1963) is an Iranian philosopher and associate professor of religion at the Research Institute for Islamic Culture and Thought. He is also the head of Hikmat and Religious Studies Faculty of the Institute. Arab-Salehi is known for his works on hermeneutics and historicism and is a recipient of the Iranian Book of the Season Award for his book Historicism and Religion (2012).

== Books ==
- The Problem of Revelation, 2009
- Al-Ghaib and Life, 2014
- Understanding in the Trap of Historicism, 2010
- Historicism and Religion, 2012
- Methodology of Divine Commandment, 2015
