= Meimanat Hosseini-Chavoshi =

Iranian demographer

Meimanat Hosseini-Chavoshi (Persian: میمنت حسینی چاوشی) is an Australian-Iranian demographer and a Research Fellow at the Australian National University. She won Iran's Book of the Year Award for the book The Fertility Transition in Iran: Revolution and Reproduction (with Peter McDonald and Mohammad Jalal Abbasi-Shavazi). From December 2018 to January 2019 she was detained in Iran for more than a month, after it was alleged that she had been trying to "infiltrate" Iranian institutions.

== See also ==
- List of foreign nationals detained in Iran
