= Hajj and Pilgrimage Organization (Iran) =

Religious organization

- سازمان حج و زیارت
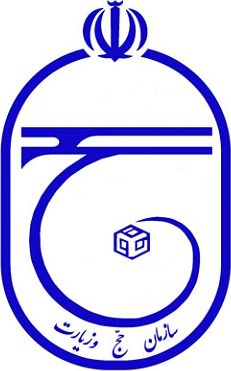

Agency overview
- Formed: 1979
- Headquarters: Tehran, Iran
- Agency executive: Alireza Rashidiyan, Head of organization
- Website: www.haj.ir

Hajj and Pilgrimage Organization (HPO, Persian: سازمان حج و زیارت) of Iran is part of Iran's Ministry of Culture and Islamic Guidance. The Hajj and Pilgrimage Organization is a government organization whose goals match Iran's policies, thoughts of Ruhollah Khomeini, guidelines of the Supreme Leader, and president. It was founded in 1979. Before that Hajj was managed by Ministry of Interior.

== History ==
Recent heads of the organization include Seyyed Ahmad Mousavi, Saeed Owhadi, and Ali Reza Rashidian (appointed 5 December 2018).

In January 2016, after executions of Nimr Baqir al-Nimr, leader Shia in Saudi Arabia's Eastern Province, Iranian protesters stormed the Saudi Arabia embassy in Tehran. After this event, Saudi Arabia cut off relations with Iran. Owhadi said: "the decision to continue or suspend hajj travel to Mecca and Medina would ultimately be up to Supreme Leader Ayatollah Ali Khamenei."

== See also ==
- Islamic Development Organization
- Ali Qazi Askar
- Abdul Fattah Nawab
