= Peter McDonald (demographer) =

Australian demographer (born 1946)

Peter McDonald AO FASSA
- Born: Peter Francis McDonald; 1946 (age 79–80)
- Occupations: Academic, demographer
- Awards: Iran's Book of the Year Award (2010); Irene B. Taeuber Award (2015); IUSSP Laureate Award (2022)

Academic background
- Education: Australian National University
- Thesis: Age at First Marriage and Proportions Marrying in Australia, 1860-1971 (1972)

Academic work
- Discipline: Demographer
- Notable ideas: Gender equity theory of fertility

Peter Francis McDonald AO FASSA (born 1946) is an Australian demographer and Emeritus Professor of Demography in the Crawford School of Public Policy of the Australian National University. He is known for his research on fertility transition and migration. He has researched extensively in Southeast Asia.

== Early life and education ==
McDonald graduated from St Patrick's College, Strathfield, in 1962.

== Career ==
McDonald has had a significant impact on demographic teaching, research and policy formulation. In 2016, then-Prime Minister of Australia, Malcolm Turnbull, described McDonald as "arguably the world’s leading demographer".

In 2016, McDonald was appointed Professor of Demography and head of the Demography Unit within the Centre for Health Policy at the University of Melbourne.

He was President of the International Union for the Scientific Study of Population (IUSSP) from 2010 to 2013.

== Awards and honours ==
McDonald was elected a Fellow of the Academy of the Social Sciences in Australia in 1998.

Together with Mohammad Jalal Abbasi-Shavazi and Meimanat Hosseini-Chavoshi, McDonald won Iran's Book of the Year Award in 2010 for the book The Fertility Transition in Iran: Revolution and Reproduction.

In 2015, McDonald was awarded the Irene B. Taeuber Award by the Population Association of America. He received the IUSSP Laureate Award in 2022.

McDonald was appointed a Member of the Order of Australia in the 2008 Queen's Birthday Honours. He was promoted to an Officer of the Order of Australia in the 2024 Australia Day Honours for "distinguished service to demographic research, to policy development, and to professional associations".

== Selected bibliography ==
=== Fertility ===
- McDonald, Peter (2000). "Gender equity, social institutions and the future of fertility". Journal of Population Research. 17 (1): 1–16. doi:10.1007/BF03029445. hdl:1885/41448.
- McDonald, Peter (2000). "Gender equity in theories of fertility transition". Population and Development Review. 26 (3): 427–439. doi:10.1111/j.1728-4457.2000.00427.x. hdl:1885/41470.
- McDonald, Peter (2002). "Sustaining fertility through public policy: The range of options". Population. 57 (3): 417–446. doi:10.3917/popu.203.0423.
- McDonald, Peter (2006). "Low fertility and the state: The efficacy of policy". Population and Development Review. 32 (3): 485–510. doi:10.1111/j.1728-4457.2006.00134.x.
- Abbasi-Shavazi, Mohammad Jalal; McDonald, Peter; Hosseini-Chavoshi, Meimanat (2009). The Fertility Transition in Iran: Revolution and Reproduction. Dordrecht: Springer. doi:10.1007/978-90-481-3198-3. ISBN 978-90-481-3197-6.
- McDonald, Peter (2013). "Societal foundations for explaining low fertility: Gender equity". Demographic Research. 28: 981–994. doi:10.4054/DemRes.2013.28.34. hdl:1885/62353.

=== Population dynamics ===
- McDonald, Peter; Kippen, Rebecca (1999). "Ageing: The social and demographic dimensions" (PDF). In Productivity Commission; Melbourne Institute of Applied Economic and Social Research (eds.). Policy Implications of the Ageing of Australia's Population. Canberra: Productivity Commission. pp. 47–70. ISBN 0-646-33598-7.
- McDonald, Peter; Kippen, Rebecca (2001). "Labor supply prospects in 16 developed countries, 2000–2050". Population and Development Review. 27 (1): 1–32. doi:10.1111/j.1728-4457.2001.00001.x.
- Khoo, Siew-Ean; McDonald, Peter; Giorgas, Dimi; Birrell, Bob (2002). Second Generation Australians: Report for the Department of Immigration and Multicultural and Indigenous Affairs. Canberra: Australian Centre for Population Research, Research School of Social Sciences, Australian National University. hdl:1885/41441.
- Khoo, Siew-Ean; McDonald, Peter; Voigt-Graf, Carmen; Hugo, Graeme (2007). "A global labor market: Factors motivating the sponsorship and temporary migration of skilled workers to Australia". International Migration Review. 41 (2): 480–510. doi:10.1111/j.1747-7379.2007.00076.x.

=== Family demography ===
- McDonald, Peter (1985). "Social organization and nuptiality in developing societies". In Cleland, John; Hobcraft, John; Dinesen, Betzy (eds.). Reproductive Change in Developing Countries: Insights from the World Fertility Survey. Oxford: Oxford University Press. pp. 87–114. ISBN 0-19-828465-9.
- McDonald, Peter (1992). "Convergence or compromise in historical family change?". In Berquó, Elza; Xenos, Peter (eds.). Family Systems and Cultural Change. Oxford: Clarendon Press. pp. 15–30. ISBN 0-19-828384-9.
