= Mohammad Abbasi-Shavazi =

Iranian demographer

Mohammad Jalal Abbasi-Shavazi
- Born: 23 August 1965 (age 61); Yazd, Iran
- Education: University of Isfahan; University of Tehran; Australian National University
- Awards: 2011 United Nations Population Award
- Scientific career
- Fields: Demography
- Workplaces: University of Tehran

Mohammad Jalal Abbasi-Shavazi (Persian: محمدجلال عباسی شوازی; born 23 August 1965) is an Iranian demographer and the president of the Asian Population Association. He is a professor of the Department of Demography, and Chair of the Division of Population Research at the University of Tehran.

== Awards ==
He was awarded the 2011 United Nations Population Award. Abbasi Shavazi won Iran's Book of the Year Award for the book The Fertility Transition in Iran: Revolution and Reproduction (with Meimanat Hosseini-Chavoshi and Peter Francis McDonald).
