= Ali Akbar Rashad =

Iranian Ayatollah and philosopher

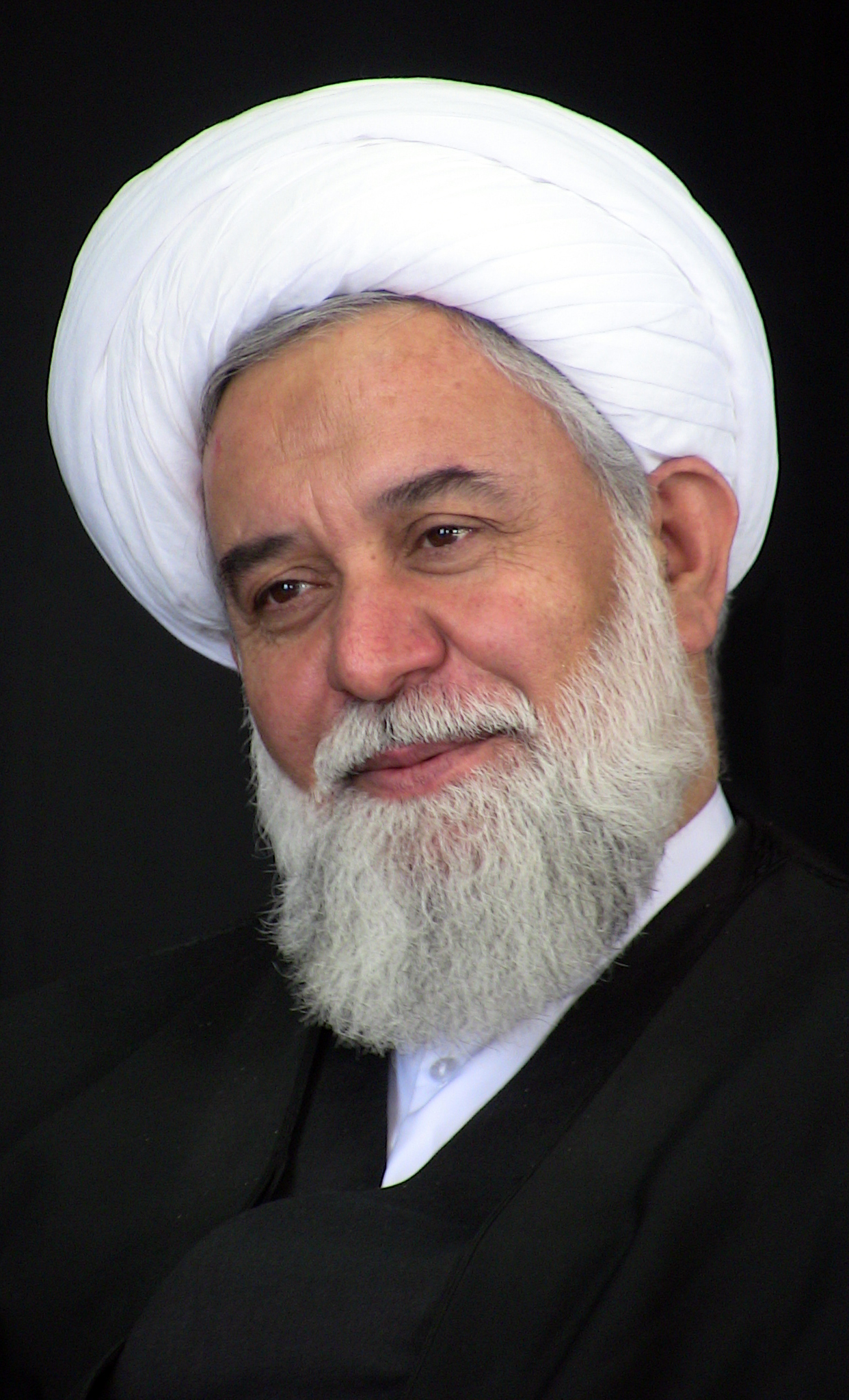
- Born: 1955 (age 70–71)

Philosophical work
- Era: 20th-century philosophy
- Region: Islamic philosophy
- School: Islamic jurisprudence
- Main interests: Philosophy of religion, Islamic theology
- Notable ideas: Ibtina theory Logic of understanding religion

Ali Akbar Rashad (born 1955) is an Iranian philosopher and Islamic scholar who pioneered the Ibtina Theory, a theory for explaining the process and mechanism of "religious knowledge" formation.

He is currently a professor at the Islamic Research Institute for Culture and Thought as well as a member of the Supreme Cultural Revolution Council (SCRC). He is also the founder and chair of Imam Reza Islamic seminary. The has presented articles and delivered speeches at conferences and scientific and philosophical conventions and conferences in different countries including Germany, the United States, the United Arab Emirates, England, Bosnia, Pakistan, Turkey, Russia, Sudan, Syria, Saudi Arabia, France, India, and Greece among others.

== Education ==
Ali Akbar Rashad is a graduate of Tehran and Qom Islamic seminaries; he completed his introductory and first grade of Islamic seminary education, in Tehran between 1967 and 1970. Then, he went to Qom to further his education in 1970, and was admitted to Grand Ayatollah Golpayegani's Islamic Seminary school, which was considered the first scheduled educational center conducted on the new seminary methodology. He completed the second grade in this seminary school. He also took Ayatollah Shabzendehdar Shirazi's exegesis and Islamic doctrine lessons, and religions (Judaism, Christianity, Baháʼí Faith and the secretary of Wahhabism, ) lessons presented by Abd-ol-Gha'em Shooshtari during the very same period.

== Academic activities ==
Rashad has been teaching higher levels of principles of jurisprudence, philosophy of religion, philosophy and mysticism in the "Islamic seminary of Tehran" as well as the philosophy of religion and discourse and logic of Understanding Religion at university of Tehran and university of Mashhad for the past thirty years.

In the past ten years, IICT has compiled, or has been compiling, four different encyclopedias under professor Rashad's supervision:

1. The Encyclopedia of Imam Ali (published in 13 volumes)
2. The Encyclopedia of Qur'an (six out of twenty five volumes completed)
3. The Encyclopedia of the Holy Prophet's Conduct (fifteen volumes; in press).
4. The Encyclopedia of Fatimah Culture (six volumes).

== Translated works ==
Title	Language	Format
Philosophy of Religion	Arabic	Book
Sacred Democracy	Arabic	Book
Philosophy of religion	English	Book
Sacred Democracy	English	Book
Philosophy of religion	Malay	Book
Violence and Tolerance	French	Book
Sacred Democracy	Spanish	Book
Philosophy of Religion	Azeri	Book
A Critique on John Hick's Religious Pluralism	English	Book
The Necessity of the Provision of Philosophy of Religion, Logic of Exploring Religion, etc.	English	Article
The Expanse of the Functionality and Practicability of Reason in Intellection and Actualization of Religion	English	Article
Sense Devoid of Sense	English	Article
Philosophy of Religious Insight	English	Article
Is Rumi a Religious Pluralist?	English	Article
Religion and Democracy	Arabic	Article
Investigating tradition	Arabic	Article
The Expanse of the Functionality and Practicability of Reason in Intellection and Actualization of Religion	Arabic	Article
Principles of Tolerance	Arabic	Article
Philosophy of Principles	Arabic	Article
Ibtina Theory (1)	Arabic	Article
Ibtina Theory (2)	Arabic	Article
