= Dhiyaa Al-Musawi =

Bahraini politician, cleric, and writer

Dhiyaa al-Musawi
- Sayed Dheya Yahya Ali Maki al-Musawi

Shura Council of Bahrain Member
- In office 2006–Present

Supreme Council for Islamic Affairs Member
- In office 2010–Present

Personal details
- Born: 1970 (age 55–56) Manama, Kingdom of Bahrain
- Party: Bahrain Human Rights Society
- Spouse: Fatima Ali Ibrahim
- Children: Sayed Hussein, Syed Ali
- Education: University of Qom (PhD Jurisprudence)
- Profession: Politician, Author, Writer

Sayed Dheya Yahya Ali Maki al-Musawi, (Arabic: ضياء السيد يحيى علي مكي الموسوي), born in Bahrain 1970, is a politician, author, writer and former cleric.

His name has also been spelled into English as Sayed Deya’a; Syed Zia; Diaa Yehia Ali; Dheya Yhya Ali; Diya, with several last name spellings of al-Mosawi; al-Mousawi; al-Moussawi and al-Moussoui among others.

== Political career ==
Al-Musawi was appointed a member of the Shura Council of Bahrain during the second legislative term in 2006. He was also a two-term member of the Public Utilities and Environment Committee.

Dheya is a current member of the Supreme Council for Islamic Affairs and the Royal Charity Organization (a governmental charity organization sponsoring orphans and widows) and leads the anti-terrorism effort as a Shura Council member.

In 2014, al-Mousawi ran for the 6th district against four other candidates in Muharraq, Bahrain's third largest city, but withdrew prior to election day.

== Published work ==
Mr. al-Moussawi has a reoccurring article entitled Morning Coffee at the Albilad Press, one of the oldest daily newspapers in Saudi Arabia. He has 1371 articles published at Alwasat News, a more recent Bahraini newspaper.

Published books by al-Musawi (currently only in Arabic) include;

- Apostasy
- Kiss Between a Muslim and a Bomb: Death of Life (2010) ISBN 9789990145397
- Devils of Heaven (2012) ISBN 9789961008300
- Politicization of Religion

== Occupations ==
Mr. al-Musawi is a contributor to the Al-Watan Newspaper in Bahrain and is President of the Culture Dialogue Centre.

Dhiyaa is President of the Bahrain Human Rights Society.

== In the media ==
During an interview aired on Abu Dhabi Television on 29 December 2006, al-Musawi expressed his opinion that the socio-economic problems in the Arab / Islamic world that cause hatred and division are due to lack of "reform," stressing that Islam needs to "reshape religious thinking."

On a live televised debate dated 16 November 2010 (the original in Arabic being found at the Al Jazeera Youtube), regarding censoring religious programming, Dhiyaa is quoted:

"I am not against all religious TV channels, of course. I support the enlightened and tolerant Islam, but I am against those channels that I call "blow-yourself-up-and-go-to-Paradise channels," "blow-yourself-up-and-have-lunch-tomorrow-with-the-Prophet channels." This notion is the exact opposite of what the Prophet Muhammad conveyed."

On 16 November 2015, speaking to the Bahraini parliament about building an enlightened society by eliminating extremism, Mr. al-Moussawi expressed:

"... building national enlightened minds is the essential foundation, it can build a society. Without enlightened minds, the construction of the modern state cannot be done without education in spite of all the stock that was thrown on the reform project... we must also install the values of tolerance and moderation, and this will not only be a civil state. We are against secular extremism and religious extremism..."

In April 2016, Al-Musawi is quoted addressing the Bahraini Shura Council in advocating for progress in growing women's rights, asking not to allow the current law, supported by the state Constitution, to be weakened, and questioning the political fear-mongering rhetoric.

== Personal life ==
Al-Musawi is married to Lady Fatima Ali Ibrahim, who also has political and reformist aspirations. They have two sons; Sayed Hussein and Syed Ali.

He likes traveling, playing table tennis, reading, writing and poetic composition. He has a bachelor's degree of Arabic language and a graduate's degree in Islamic jurisprudence from Qom University in Iran, studying under Kazem al-Haeri among other professors.

At age 16 Dhiyaa was inspired to write after reading an issue of the Kuwaiti magazine Al-Arabi. Prior to entering the seminary, he found profound inspiration reading the poetry and political writings of Nizar Qabbani.
