= Ibtina theory =

Ibtina theory is a new theory in the field of "logic of understanding religion" and has direct influence on the issues of philosophy of religion. Ibtina theory is a theory for explaining the process and mechanism of "religious knowledge" formation.

== Overview ==
The theory was formulated and developed for the first time by Ali Akbar Rashad in 2009 and considered, studied and criticized by philosophers of religion as a new theory.

Ali Akbar Rashad explained the theory in his book "Logic of Understanding Religion". Moreover, many books and articles have been written and published by Iranian thinkers affected by this theory. In 2009, an assembly held by National Secretary of Chairs and Forums for Theorization, Critique, Innovation and Debate" (affiliate center of Iranian Supreme Council of the Cultural Revolution) to investigate and criticize the claims of this theory; consequently, after numerous debates and discussions it has been announced as a new theory in the field of "logic of Understanding Religion" and "Philosophy of Religious Knowledge".

In the same year, Ali Akbar Rahad was nominated for "eminent theoretician" (Farabi International Award) for his theorizing and then received prizes and awards from UNESCO, ISESCO, Ministry of Science, Research and Technology (Iran) and the President of Iran.

== Claims of the theory ==
Ali Akbar Rashad explained in his books and articles that Ibtina theory explains the process and mechanism of religious knowledge formation. He claims that religious knowledge is "the outcome of Permissible effort to explore religious statements and teachings". In another word (expression), "epistemic system derived from the usage of valid and permissible methodology for exploring religious propositions" is called religious knowledge. Philosophy of religious knowledge is also "philosophical quasi-science which is in charge of ultra-perspective and rational study on general principles for resulting religious knowledge of fundamental problems of religious knowledge".

He claims that "some theories on the process and method of formation and resulting knowledge –in general sense (proper and improper) more or less have been presented by some philosophers. But, no one has presented a revised discussion of the process and mechanism of religious knowledge formation." Although through some theories that has been presented on the religious knowledge we can acquire some view points of masters of knowledge. But they never present the discussion in the clear and self-evident manner about the process and mechanism of religious knowledge formation. From among the western thinkers, Hermeneuticians have discussed on the method of knowledge formation and the influence of some epistemic and non-epistemic factors in interpretation of the text. But they have not explained the process of religious knowledge formation. Also the theory of contraction and expansion which is a hermeneutical theory, concerns the justification of the problem of "religious knowledge evolution", but not the explanation of "knowledge formation".
