= University of Qom =

Public university in Qom, Iran

- دانشگاه قم; Dāneshgāh-e Qom
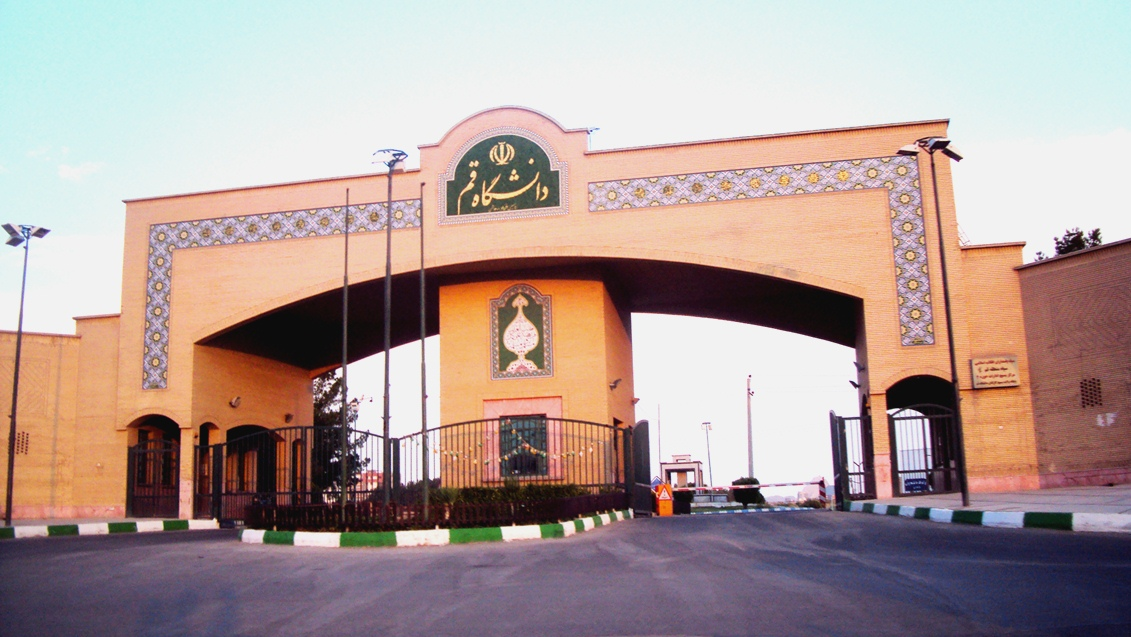
- University of Qom gate
- Type: Public
- Established: 1980
- Founder: Mahdi Ghazi Khoramabadi
- Affiliations: Ministry of Science, Research and Technology (Iran)
- President: Ahmad Hossein Sharifi
- Academic staff: 282
- Students: About 10,000
- Location: Near Shahrak-e-Qods, Alghadir Blvd., Qom, Qom province, 3716146611, Iran; 34°36′04.4″N 50°49′32.4″E
- Campus: Urban
- Language: Persian
- Athletics: Football, badminton, volleyball, basketball, wrestling
- Website: https://www.qom.ac.ir/

The University of Qom (Persian: دانشگاه قم) is an Iranian public university in Qom. After an endorsement by the Council of the Islamic Revolution and under the supervision of the Society of Seminary Teachers of Qom, the university was founded in 1980 (1358 SH) as the High Educational and Legal School of the Seminarians of Qom by Mohammad Beheshti, Mohammad Javad Bahonar and Mehdi Ghazi Khorramabadi. It is an academic center in the field of legal studies. In 1985 (1364 SH), after confirmation by the Supreme Council of the Cultural Revolution, the school also admitted high-school graduates. It received its current name in 1997 (1376 SH).

The university covers 140 hectares (350 acres) and consists of six faculties, seven research and technology centers, 10 research groups, 33 academic departments, and 164 academic fields. It has about 10,000 students in bachelor's, master's and Ph.D. programs) and 282 academic-staff members: 12 full professors, 90 associate professors, 160 assistant professors, and 20 instructors. Most university activities are in the fields of civil engineering, IT and computer engineering, industrial engineering, mechanical engineering and law. The university has a dress code which requires female students to wear a chador.

== Faculties and departments ==
=== Faculty of Engineering ===
The Faculty of Engineering was established in 2003 as the first center of engineering in Qom province. It consists of these departments:

- Department of Civil Engineering
- Department of Computer Engineering and Information Technology
- Department of Industrial Engineering
- Department of Mechanical Engineering
- Department of Architectural Engineering
- Department of Electrical Engineering
- Department of Chemical Engineering

=== Faculty of Basic Sciences ===
Four years after the establishment of undergraduate physics and mathematics programs, the Faculty of Basic Sciences was established. It consists of the following departments:

- Department of Physics
- Department of Mathematics
- Department of Chemistry
- Department of Statistics
- Department of Biology
- Department of Computer Science

=== Faculty of Management and Economics ===
The Faculty of Management and Economics was established in 2011. It consists of the following departments:

- Department of Business Management
- Department of Industrial Management
- Department of Accounting
- Department of Economics

=== Faculty of Literature and Humanities ===
The Faculty of Literature and Humanities began in 2001. It consists of the following departments:

- Department of Persian Language and Literature
- Department of English Language and Literature
- Department of Arabic Language and Literature
- Department of Educational Sciences
- Department of Physical Education
- Department of Information Sciences and Knowledge Studies

=== Faculty of Law ===
The Faculty of Law encompasses the undergraduate, postgraduate and doctoral levels. It consists of the following departments:

- Department of International and Public Law
- Department of Private Law
- Department of Intellectual Property Law
- Department of Criminology and Criminal Law

=== Faculty of Theology and Islamic Studies ===
The Faculty of Theology and Islamic Studies and its four departments were established in 2001. It currently consists of the following departments:

- Department of Quran and Hadith Sciences
- Department of Jurisprudence and the Concept of Law
- Department of Philosophy of Ethics
- Department of Islamic Philosophy and Theology
- Department of Islamic Studies
- Department of Shia studies

== Student social network ==
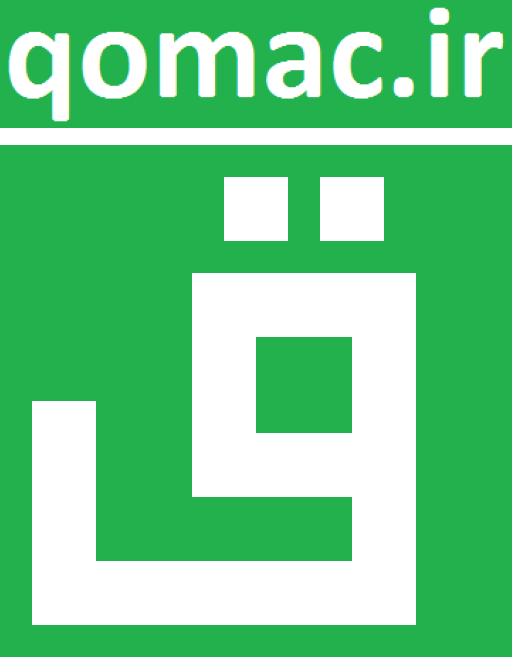
University of Qom student social-network domain and logo

The university's student social network is a website which enables users to chat, send and receive texts, and share images and videos.

== Ranking ==
- Webometrics Ranking of World Universities (January 2026)
  - Global: 3,119
  - Asia: 1,271
  - Iran: 54
- Unirank
  - Global University: 4,926
  - International University: 72
- SCImago Institutions Rankings
  - Global percentile: 97th
  - Middle East: 94th
  - Iran: 90th

== Notable alumni ==
- Ammar al-Hakim (Arabic: سید عمار الحكيم), Iraqi cleric and politician who led the Islamic Supreme Council of Iraq from 2009 to 2017
- Dhiyaa Al-Musawi, born in Bahrain 1970, politician, author, writer, and former cleric
- Mohammad Arab-Salehi, born 1963, philosopher and associate professor of religion
- Seyyed Hassan Eslami Ardakani, born 1960, philosopher and professor of ethics
- Sayed Muhammad Hassan Sharifi Balkhabi (Dari: سید محمد حسن شریفی بلخابی), politician
- Mohsen Kadivar, visiting scholar at Islamic Legal Studies Program of Harvard Law School in 2002, visiting professor of Islamic studies at the University of Virginia (2008–2009), and at Duke University (fall 2009 – spring 2014), who held the fall 2014 Keohane Distinguished Visiting Professorship of University of North Carolina at Chapel Hill and is currently a research professor of Islamic Studies in the department of religious studies at Duke University
- Mansour Leghaei, born 1962, the founder and a director of the Imam Husain Islamic Centre and the School of Islamic Theology in Earlwood, Australia
- Hamid Naderi Yeganeh (Persian: حمید نادری یگانه), born 1990, mathematical artist, digital artist
