= Alireza Qaeminia =

Iranian cleric philosopher

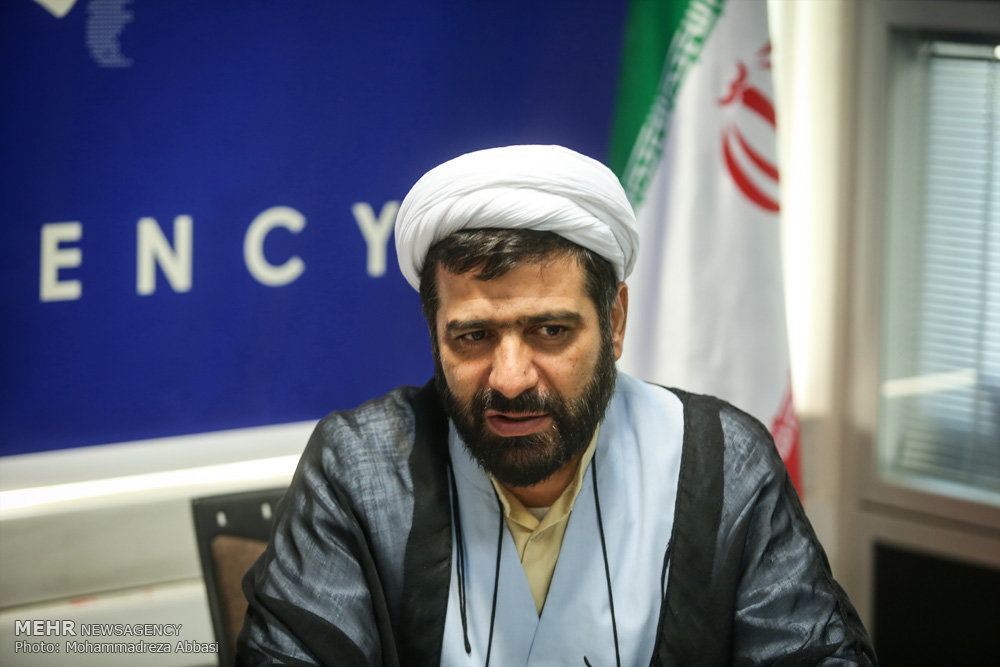
- Known for: works on hermeneutics and exegesis
- Scientific career
- Fields: Islamic philosophy
- Institutions: Research Institute for Islamic Culture and Thought

Alireza Qaeminia is an Iranian philosopher and associate professor of epistemology at the Research Institute for Islamic Culture and Thought. He is a recipient of the Iranian Book of the Year Award for his book Biology of the Religious Text.

== Works ==
- Biology of the Religious Text, 2010
- Origin of Religion, 2002
- Revelation and Speech Acts
- Semiotics and Interpretation of the Quran
- The logic of understanding religion : an introduction to the methodology of discovering religion propositions and doctrines
