= Mahmoud Hekmatnia =

Iranian legal scholar

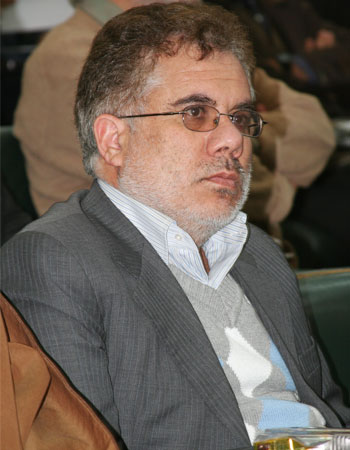
- Known for: works on intellectual property
- Scientific career
- Fields: Islamic law
- Institutions: Research Institute for Islamic Culture and Thought

Mahmoud Hekmatnia (Persian: محمود حکمت‌نیا) is an Iranian legal scholar and professor of law at the Research Institute for Islamic Culture and Thought. He is known for his works on intellectual property. His book titled Principles of Intellectual Property won the Farabi Award and Seminary Book of the Year Award.

== Works ==
- Philosophy of Women Legal System
- Popular vote: its foundation, validity and scope
- Theoretical foundations of intellectual property, 2007
