= Nur al-Din Nimatullah al-Jazayiri =

Safavid Iranian faqih and writer

Sayyid Nur al-Din bin Ni'matallah al-Jazayiri
- نور الدين بن نعمة الله الجزائري
- Born: 1677; Shushtar, Arabistan, Safavid Empire
- Died: December 29, 1745 (aged 68); Shushtar, Arabistan, Afsharid Iran
- Resting place: Shushtar
- Occupations: Islamic jurist; writer; linguist
- Parent: Ni'matollah al-Jazayiri (father)
- Writing career
- Language: Arabic
- Subjects: Ja'fari jurisprudence, Arabic language sciences

Sayyid Nur al-Din bin Ni'matallah al-Musawi al-Jazayiri (Arabic: نور الدين بن نعمة الله الموسوي الجزائري, romanized: Nūr al-Dīn bin Niʻmatallāh al-Jazāʼirī); 1677 – 29 December 1745) was an Iranian Ja'fari jurist, linguist and writer. He excelled in both Sharia and Arabic language sciences in the early decades of the 18th century, that is, the end of the Safavid Empire. A renowned Iranian Arab writer and orator in his time, he was born in Shushtar to Ni'matollah al-Jazayiri, a prominent Safavid Ja'fari jurist. He studied in Isfahan from Al-Hurr al-Amili and obtained an Ijazah. Then assumed religious leadership of Shushtar, succeeded his deceased father, and worked as khatib, naqib, imam, qadi and teacher. Al-Jazayiri wrote some books, booklets, exegesis and prose texts on different topics of his specialties. He died at the age of 68 in his hometown, Shushtar.

== Biography ==
Nur al-Din al-Musawi al-Jazayiri was born in Shushtar in 1088 AH/ 1677 AD, a city of Arabistan during Safavid Empire, and grew up there into a notable Musawi family. He studied under his father first, Ni'matollah al-Jazayiri until he died in 1701. With his maternal uncle Saleh bin Ata'allah, he had made pilgrimage to Imam Reza shrine in Mashhad. On the way back, he settled in Isfahan and continued his religious education there. He studied from ulema of Isfahan, including: Al-Hurr al-Amili, Ismail Husseini Khatunabadi, Muhammad Saleh Khatunabadi and the others, until he completed his education in Ja'fari jurisprudence and gained Ijazah from al-Amili.

After years he returned to his hometown, Shushtar. He assumed religious leadership there, succeeded his deceased father. He worked as khatib, naqib, imam, qadi and teacher. He made many trips in Iran, performed the Hajj, and in Hejaz he met some ulema.

Nur al-Din al-Jazayiri died on the night of 6 Dhu al-Hijjah 1158 / 29 December 1745 at the age of 68 in Shushtar. He was buried near its Great Mosque, and a shrine built for his grave.

== Writings ==
In Arabic literature, he wrote prose texts in the epilogue of his book Furūq al-lughāt, which topics are different between preaching, storytelling, riddles, al-ikhwaniyat, khutbah, linguistics, etc.Among his works in Arabic are:

- Arabic: كتاب فی النحو مبسوط إلی باب التمییز
- Arabic: رسالة فی شكوك الصلاة
- Arabic: رسالة فی حل بعض الأحادیث المشكلة
- Arabic: رسالة فی أحكام الطهارات
- Arabic: مفتاح الصحبة فی شرح النخبة
- Arabic: ترجمة الشرح الزبور
- Arabic: ترجمة قصص الأنبیاء by his father, Ni'matullah
- Arabic: ترجمة وصیة هشام
- Arabic: فروق اللغات في التمييز بين مفاد الكلمات, romanized: Furūq al-lughāt fī al-tamyīz bayna mufād al-kalimāt
- Arabic: كتاب السیفیة فی اللغز
