= Sayed Muhammad Hassan Sharifi Balkhabi =

Afghan politician (born 1974)

Sayed Muhammad Hassan Sharifi Balkhabi سید محمد حسن شریفی بلخابی

Afghanistan Parliament

Personal details
- Born: 1974 (age 51–52) Balkhab, Sar-e Pol province, Afghanistan
- Party: Hezbe Wahdat
- Occupation: Politician
- Religion: Shia Islam

Sayed Muhammad Hassan Sharifi Balkhabi (Dari: سید محمد حسن شریفی بلخابی) is a politician and the former representative of the people of Sar-e Pol province during the 16th session of the Afghanistan Parliament.

== Early life ==
Sayed Muhammad Hassan Sharifi Balkhabi, was born in 1974 in Balkhab District of Sar-e Pol Province, Afghanistan.

Balkhabi completed his elementary and secondary education at a school in Balkhab district of Sar-e Pol province in 1995. In 2001, he obtained a Master's Degree in Islamic religious studies at the University of Qom in Qom, Iran. Balkhabi is a member of Hezbe Wahdat party.
