= Iranian Police Ideological−Political Organization =

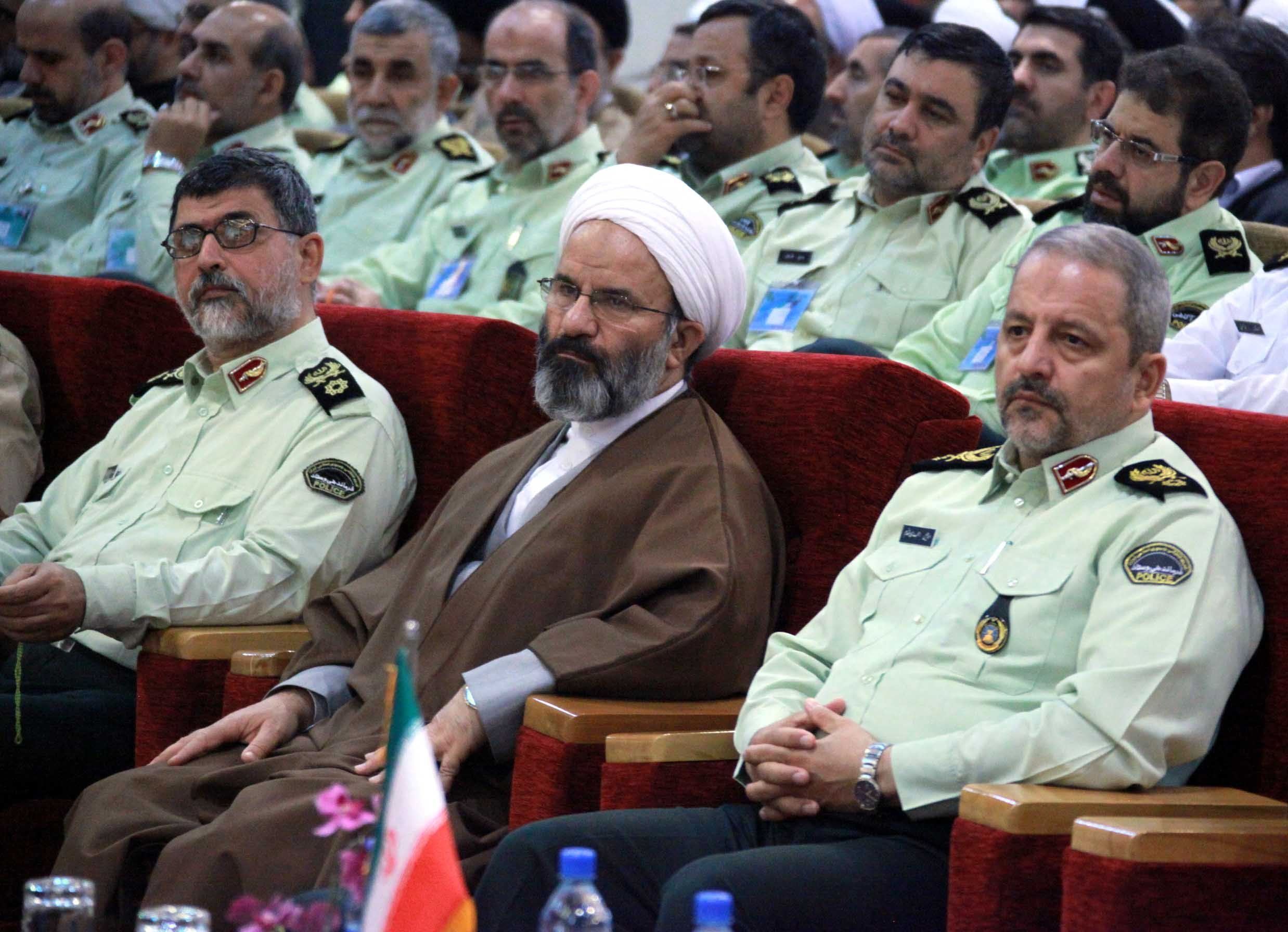
Hujjat al-Islam Aboutorab Bahrami (middle), Former Head of Ideological−Political Organization of NAJA

Ideological−Political Organization or Bureau of FARAJA (Persian: سازمان عقیدتی سیاسی فراجا; Aghidati-Siasi) is one of three virtually independent hierarchical systems inside Law Enforcement Force of Islamic Republic of Iran, alongside its Command system (led by the Chief Police Commander) and the Intelligence Protection Organization. Director of the organization is directly appointed by the Supreme Leader of Iran. The Ideological−Political organizations of Iranian armed forces are taught to indoctrinate the personnel with Islamic and political training aligned with the Supreme Leader's guidelines. The organization is supervised by clerics.

== Heads ==
- Mohammad-Ali Rahmani (1991-2007)
- Aboutorab Bahrami (2007-2018)
- Alireza Adyani (2018-2025)
- Ali Shirazi (2025-present)
