= Abolghasem Alidoust =

Iranian Ayatollah

- ابوالقاسم علیدوست
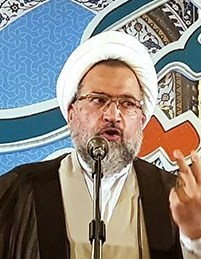
- Born: 1961 (age 64–65); Yazd, Iran
- Known for: works on Islamic Fiqh
- Awards: Iranian Book of the Year
- Scientific career
- Fields: Fiqh
- Workplaces: Research Institute for Islamic Culture and Thought

Abolghasem Alidoust is an Iranian cleric and legal scholar and professor of Fiqh at the Research Institute for Islamic Culture and Thought. He is a recipient of the Iranian Book of the Year Award for his book titled Fiqh and Maslaha.

== Works ==
- Fiqh and Maslaha, 2009
- Fiqh and Urf, 2005
- Fiqh and Reason, 2002
- Fiqh of New Issues, 2016
- Fiqh of Nuclear Issues, 2018
- Fiqh of Art, 2016
