= Abdolkarim Behjatpoor =

Iranian legal scholar

- Scientific career
- Fields: Tafsir
- Institutions: Research Institute for Islamic Culture and Thought

Abdolkarim Behjatpoor is an Iranian cleric and associate professor of Quranic Studies at the Research Institute for Islamic Culture and Thought. He is a recipient of the Best Research Award by the Ministry of Culture and Islamic Guidance (2010).

== Works ==
- Is the proponent of Tahrif Murtad?
- Analytic Bibliography of Quaran and Congtemporary Culture
- Tafsir in Accordance with Wahy
- An Introduction to Principles of Cultural Change
- Quran and Us
- Thematic Tafsir of Quran
