= Mahdi Abbaszadeh =

Iranian philosopher

- Education: Allameh Tabataba'i University (PhD)
- Known for: works on existential theology and epistemological theories of Islamic philosophers, works on philosophy of Duns Scotus
- Awards: Iranian Book of the Year Award
- Scientific career
- Fields: Islamic and Western philosophy
- Institutions: Research Institute for Islamic Culture and Thought
- Thesis: Duns Scotus and Modern Western Thought (2009)

Mahdi Abbaszadeh is an Iranian philosopher and associate professor of epistemology at the Research Institute for Islamic Culture and Thought who is a recipient of the Iranian Book of the Year Award for his book System of Illuminative Epistemology of Al-Suhrawardi.

== Books ==
- Avicenna's Influence on Duns Scotus, 2013
- System of Illuminative Epistemology of Al-Suhrawardi, 2016
- Existential Theology: A Comparative and Critical Study of John Macquarrie's Thinking, 2017
- Philosophical Essays, 2020
