= Abdul Fattah Nawab =

Iranian cleric

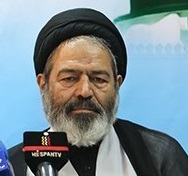

Superintendent of Iranian Hujjaj
- Incumbent
- Assumed office 2019
- Appointed by: Ali Khamenei

Personal details
- Born: 1957 (age 68–69) Isfahan, Iran

Seyyed Abdul Fattah Nawab (Persian: سید عبدالفتاح نواب) (also: Abdulfattah Nawab) (born: 1957, Shahreza, Isfahan) is an Iranian Twelver Shia cleric who has been recently appointed as the new representative of Guardianship of the Islamic Jurist in the affairs of Hajj and pilgrimage by the decree of Iran's Supreme leader, Seyyed Ali Khamenei; Nawab, also has the record of activity in the Be'seh of Iran's Supreme leader.

Seyyed Abdul Fattah Nawab was born in 1957 in the city of Shahreza (Isfahan), and commenced his Hawzah education in that city; Later on, he departed to Qom to continue his education, and entered Qom Seminary.

== Teachers ==
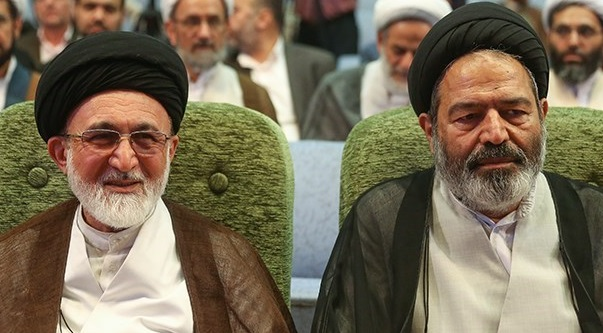
Seyyed Abdol-Fattah Navab (the right person in the image), beside Seyyed Ali Qazi Askar (left one)

Amongst Seyyed Abdul-Fattah Nawab's teachers are:

- Mohammad Fazel Lankarani
- Mousa Shubairi Zanjani
- Kazem al-Haeri
- Hussein-Ali Montazeri
- Jawad Tabrizi
- Abdollah Javadi-Amoli
- Morteza Motahhari
- Hassan Hassanzadeh Amoli
- Gholam-Reza Salavati
- Mohammad-Taqi Sotudeh
- Ali Ahmadi Miyanji
- Yahya Ansari Shirazi
- Ali Meshkini

== See also ==
- Hajj and Pilgrimage Organization (Iran)
- Seyyed Ali Qazi Askar
- Islamic Development Organization
