= Nematollah Jazayeri =

Shia Akhbari scholar

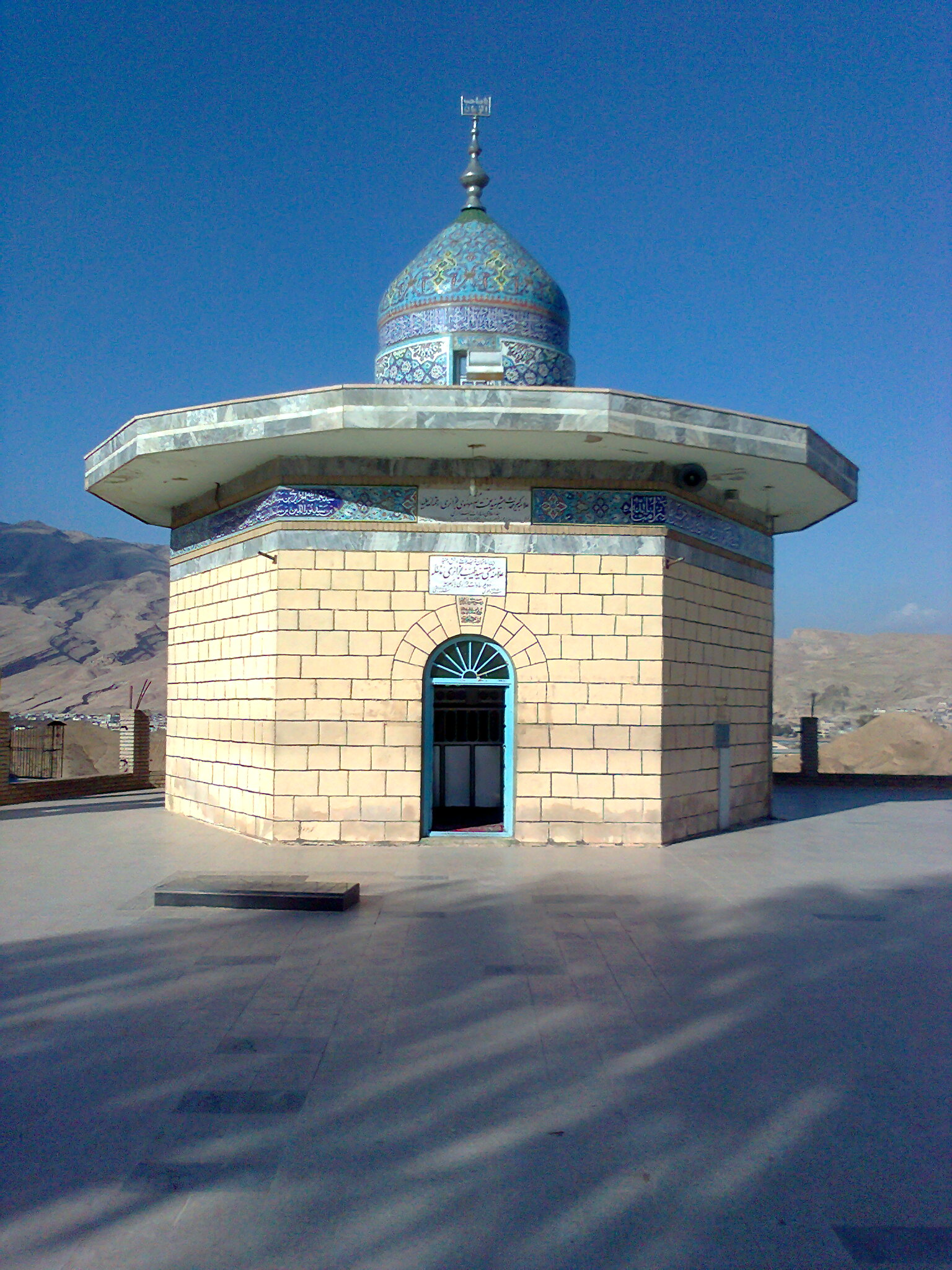
Tomb of Seyyed Nematollah Jazayeri in Pol-e Dokhtar

Seyyed Nematollah Jazayeri (Arabic :سید نعمة الله الجزائري, Persian: سید نعمت الله جزایری) was a prominent Shia Akhbari scholar born in 1640 and died in 1700, in one of the islands (hence called Jazayeri, Island: Jazireh) around Basra. He was one of the grandchildren of Musa al-Kadhim (the 7th Imam of Shias). His paternal lineage is as follows: Seyyed Ne'mat Allah son of Seyyed Abd Allah son of Mohammad son of Hossein son of Ahmad son of Mahmoud son of Ghias Aldin son of Majd Aldin son of Noor Aldin son of Saad Allah son of Issa son of Musa son of Abdallah son of Musa al-Kadhim.

== Early life ==
After finishing primary education, Jazayeri and his brother (Seyyed Najm al–Din) traveled to Shiraz –Iran to continue his education. He led a poor and difficult life in Shiraz, he had to work hard to be able to study. Therefore, he transcribed books, corrected the transcriptions and wrote glosses on books in order to earn money. Sometimes he worked from night up to morning, then studied his lessons and started teaching up to midday and after that he himself attended one of his masters’ class. He spent three years in this manner in Shiraz. He studied under great teachers in Shiraz: Sheikh Jafar Bahrani (d. 1679), Ibrahim Ibn mullah Sadra, shah Abul Vali Shirazi, Seyyed Hashem Ehsaee, Sheikh Saleh Kazkazani (d. 1686). After marriage he traveled to Isfahan to complete his education. The following are some of his teachers in Isfahan: Seyyed Ahmad Mirza Jazayeri, Mirza Rafi’ Tabatabaei (d. 1668), Sheikh Emad Yazdi, Mohaqeq Sabzewari (d.1678), Sheikh Ali Aameli, Sheikh Horr Aameli (d. 1692), Sheikh Hossein Khansari (d. 1686), Amir Ismail Khatun Abaadi (d. 1704), mullah Mohsen Feiz Kashani (d. 1679) and Allameh Baqer Majlesi some of Allameh Baqer Majlesi Pupils More than 1,000 scholars and researchers have benefited from the advantageous classes of Allameh Majlesi. He has also issued many religious authorizations and licenses for his pupils. The following are recorded as some of his pupils:

1- Sayyed Ne'mat Allah Jazayeri one of the Grandsons of Imam Musa Kazim (7th Imam of the Shias)

2- Jafar son of Abdullah Kamareyee Isfahani

3- Zaynul-Abedin son of Sheikh Horr Ameli

4- Suleyman son of Abdullah Mahuzi Bahrani

5- Sheikh Abdul-Razzaq Guilani

6- Abdul-Reza Kashani

7- Mohammad Baqer Biabanaki

8- Mirza Abdullah Affandi Isfahani [the author of "Riyazul-Ulema"]

9- Sayyed Ali Khan Madani [the author of "Riyazul-Salekin" (a commentary on Imam Sajjad's (a.s.) Supplications)]

10-Sheikh Horr Ameli

11-Mohammad son of Ismael Fassaie Shirazi

12-Mohammad son of Hassan, known as Fazel Hindi

In Isfahan also he had a poor life but his teacher "Allameh Majlesi" helped and supported him; Jazayeri also helped him in writing the prominent book "Beharul Anwar". He stayed four years in Allameh Majlesi's house and gradually started teaching in a school. In 1668, he was invited to Khuzestan, Shushtar –Iran by the ruler of Khuzestan (Fath Ali khan). Jazayeri established many mosques and religious schools and trained great students. He was the religious leader of Khuzestan and also south of Iraq. He guided people and tried to abolish the enmity between tribes.

== Students ==
Jazayeri trained many students such as: Abul Hasan Qaravi Isfahani, Abul Hasan Shushtari, sheikh Ali Jameyi Aameli, Fath Allah Dorfi, Qazi (Judge) Taqi Shushtari, sheikh Muhammad Sabiri, sheikh Muhammad Alamul Hoda Kashani, sheikh Muhammad Najjar Shushtari, Mahmoud Meimandi and many others.

== Works ==
There are left over 55 works of him such as:

- Flower of spring
- Present of secrets
- Exegesis of the kuffir
- Rare news
- Clear light (on the stories of the prophets),
- Gardens of virtuous people (on virtues of Imams)
- Unique companion (on explanation of monotheism) and many other glosses.

Jazayeri was one of the most effective pupils of Allamah Majlesi that turned Sunni's in to Shia's. In the Safavid era, the meaning of the word "Mojtahed" suggesting "the person who attained maturity in the religious issues and who can be imitated" also changed. Seyyed Nematollah Jazayeri Al Anvar ol Alnamaniye who was a disciple of Allameh Majlesi who was considered one of the foundation stones of the Shia sect described the Mojtahed concept as "the heir of our Prophet, the caliphate of Allah and the speaking language of our God" and Mojtahed became the focus of the moral and social assessments. Mojtahed had knowledge about this world and the world which we will pass to and the recovery of the society was entirely in his responsibility. This interesting office reached such a position that the Safavid kings would take even their own crowns from the hand of Faqih or Mojtahed al Asrai.

Seyyed Nemat Allah Jazayeri died in 1700 in the city of Pol-e Dokhtar and was buried there.

== Descendants ==
=== Seyyed Muhammad Ali Mousavi Jazayeri ===
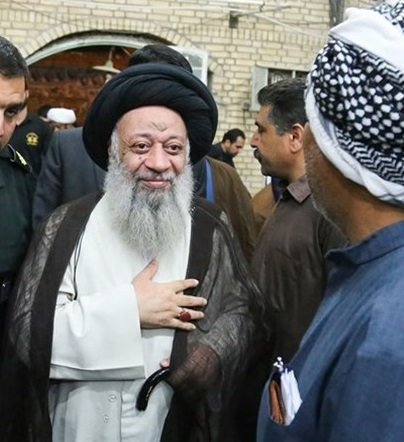
Seyyed Muhammad Ali Mousavi Jazayeri

Sayyid Mohammad-Ali Mousavi Jazayeri (Persian: سیدمحمدعلی موسوی جزایری) is an Iranian Twelver Shi'a cleric who was born in 1941 in Shushtar (Khuzestan province). He is considered among the prominent descends of Seyyed Nematollah Jazayeri, who is the representative of Guardianship of the Islamic Jurist in Khuzestan province, and is also the—permanent-- Imam al-Jom'ah of Ahwaz. This Shia scholar has studied in seminaries of Qum, Iran under Grand Ayatollah Ruhollah Khomeini and Mohammad Ali Araki; and also in seminaries of Najaf, Iraq under Grand Ayatollah Abu al-Qasim al-Khoei.

=== Seyyed Muhammad Jafar Moravej ===
Seyyed Muhammad Jafar Moravej (Persian: سید محمد جعفر مروج) whose complete name/fame is "Seyyed Muhammad Jafar Jazaeri Moravej al-Shariah" (Persian: سید محمد جعفر جزائری مروج الشریعه), was an Iranian Shia scholar who was born in 1910 in a religious family in Shushtar. His father was Seyyed Muhammad Ali Moravej, and he is among the descendants of Seyyed Nematollah Jazayeri. He eventually died in 1999.

== See also ==
- Seyyed Muhammad Jafar Jazaeri Moravej al-Shariah
- Nur al-Din Nimatullah al-Jazayiri
