= Mahmoud Salavati =

Iranian cleric

Mahmoud Salavati (محمود صلواتی)
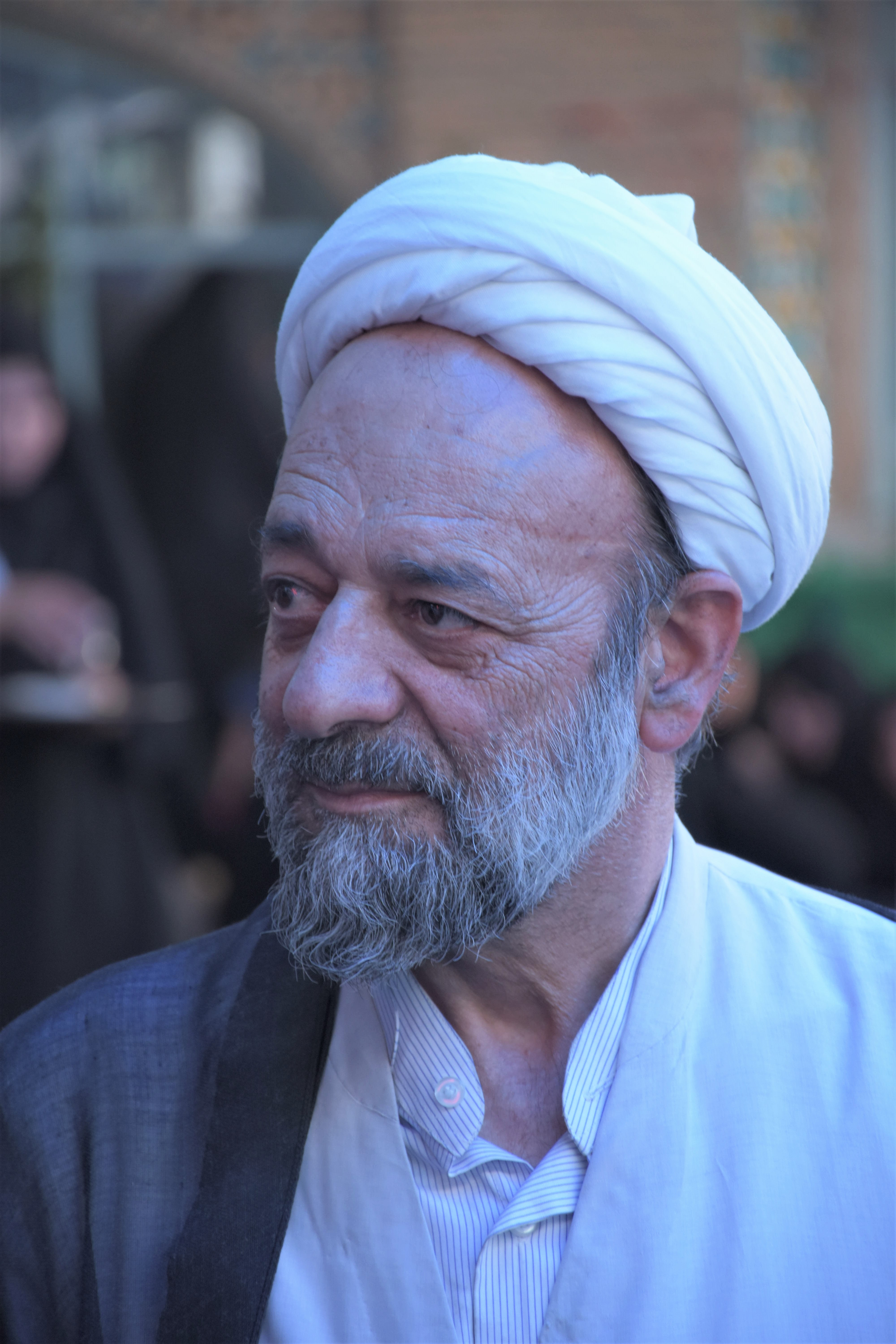
- Mahmoud Salavati
- Title: Mahmoud Salavati

Personal life
- Region: Middle East
- Main interest(s): writer, translator and religious servant

Religious life
- Religion: Islam
- Jurisprudence: Shia

Mahmoud Salavati (Persian: محمود صلواتی; born 21 March 1953 in Khomeini Shahr, Isfahan Province) is a jurist, author, commentator and translator of the Quran and Nahj, religious scholar and member of the Assembly of Qom Seminary Scholars and Researchers. He is a co-founder of the Islamic Revolution and the Iranian Revolutionary Guards. He is also the founder and the first president of the Center for Research and ideological – political Iranian Revolutionary Guards and outstanding student of Ayatollah Montazeri and Ayatollah Yousef Sanei and close associate of the late Ayatollah Taheri Esfahani is. ِِDr fazlollah Salavati is his cousin.

== Activities and Experiences ==
Mahmoud Salavati due to political activities against the regime, was arrested by SAVAK in year 52 and the Joint Anti-Terrorist Committee, where they interrogated and tortured by the police, the SAVAK, and despite incessant torture of SAVAK, due to his lack of cooperation in the Different interrogation by the military court of King, sentenced to death and with a degree of discount, was sentenced to life imprisonment and the tolerance of 5 years in prison and in Evin Prison and Evin Prison, as a political prisoner, was released in autumn 57 He is in prison for political prisoners, mostly members of the MKO, the interpretation of the Quran and Nahj al-held and taught classes to acknowledge some MKO members, the meetings of the interpretation of the Quran and Nahj the lack of interest in Marxism and the formation of a minority pole against Massoud Rajavi and the band changed ideology (which was eventually hit 54 years in MKO) was effective Mahmoud Salavati after release from prison at the beginning of the revolution, Montazeri actively with Shahid Mohammadi began to build the headquarters of the Iranian Revolutionary Guards and Iranian Revolutionary Guards in the first set of draft statutes and wrote; he is also the founder and first president of the Center for Research and conscience Political Iranian Revolutionary Guards; he Khomeini Iranian Revolutionary Guards commander was the city since the beginning of its establishment till the end of the war. Salavati hospital seminaries as well as senior management, the Prophet, Imam Muhammad al-Baqir, was the Prophet in Qom Seminary

== Compilations ==
- Angels and organizing role in the world
- FADAK the rotary should be read elegiac.
- Rigor and violence
- Legal foundations of the Islamic regime, 8 volumes (written and translated the lessons of jurisprudence governing Grand Ayatollah Montazeri)
- Understanding Nahjolbalaghe
- Translation of Quran (translation rhymed and rhythmic)
- Nahj Albadh (Prayers and Meditations of Imam Sajjad musical translation)
- Translation weighted Nahjolbalaghe
