= Mohammad-Ali Rahmani =

Iranian cleric

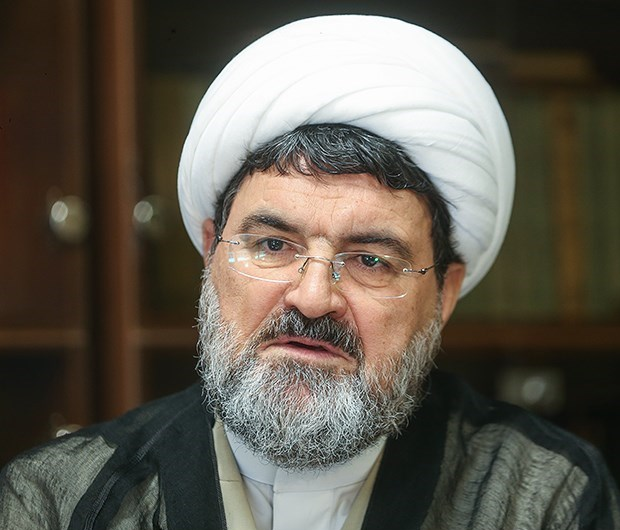
- Born: 23 April 1953 (age 73); Quchan, Iran
- Military career
- Allegiance: Iran
- Branch: Revolutionary Guards; Law Enforcement
- Service years: 1984–1990; 1991–2007
- Commands: Basij; Iranian Police Ideological−Political Organization
- Conflicts: Iran–Iraq War

Mohammad-Ali Rahmani (Persian: محمدعلی رحمانی) is an Iranian Shi'a cleric and politician. He was appointed as head of Basij on 16 February 1984 by Mohsen Rezaee and served in the capacity until January 1990.

Rahmani is a member of Association of Combatant Clerics.
