= Mohammad Hassan Ghadrdan Gharamaleki =

Iranian political scientist

- محمد حسن قدردان قراملکی
- Born: 1965 (age 59–60); Tabriz
- Awards: Howzeh Book of the Year Award
- Scientific career
- Fields: philosophy, Kalam
- Institutions: Research Institute for Islamic Culture and Thought

Hojjatoleslam Mohammad Hassan Ghadrdan Gharamaleki (born 1965) is an Iranian philosopher and professor of Kalam at the Research Institute for Islamic Culture and Thought. His books titled God and the Problem of Evil and Koran and Pluralism won the Howzeh Book of the Year Award.

== Works ==
- Secularism in Christianity and Islam
- God and the Problem of Evil
- Koran and Pluralism
- Koran and Secularlism
- Politics and Government
- Philosophical Kalam
