= Seyed Kazem Seyed Bagheri =

Iranian political scientist

- سید کاظم سیدباقری
- Born: 1971 (age 53–54); Kerman
- Scientific career
- Fields: Islamic political science
- Institutions: Research Institute for Islamic Culture and Thought

Seyed Kazem Seyed Bagheri is an Iranian political scientist and associate professor of politics at the Research Institute for Islamic Culture and Thought. His book titled Shia's Political Fiqh won the Farabi Award and Howzeh Book of the Year Award.

== Works ==
- Political Thought in Iran and Islam
- Mechanisms of Social Justice in Islamic Government
- Shia's Political Fiqh: Mechanisms of Contemporary Development
- Political Power: A Koranic Viewpoint
- Political Justice: A Koranic Viewpoint
- A Comparative study of Justice in Religious Democracy and Liberal Democracy
