= Seyed Sajjad Izdehi =

Iranian political scientist

- سید سجاد ایزدهی
- Born: 1970 (age 54–55); Mazandaran
- Scientific career
- Fields: political science, Fiqh
- Institutions: Research Institute for Islamic Culture and Thought

Hojjatoleslam Seyed Sajjad Izdehi is an Iranian political scientist and associate professor of politics at the Research Institute for Islamic Culture and Thought. His book titled Supervision on the power in the political jurisprudence won the Farabi Award and Howzeh Book of the Year Award.

== Works ==
- Clergy and politics : issues and consequences
- Supervision on the power in the political jurisprudence
- The political philosophy of Ayatollah Khamenei
- Expediency in political fiqh of Shia
