= Syed Ali Raza Rizvi =

Pakistani Shia Scholar

- Title: Maulana

Personal life
- Born: May 4, 1976 (age 50) Lahore, Pakistan
- Website: Official website

Religious life
- Religion: Usuli Twelver Shia Islam

Senior posting
- Based in: London, UK

Syed Ali Raza Rizvi (Urdu: سيد على رضا رضوى) is a Pakistani Twelver Shia Scholar. He is the president of Majlis e Ulama e Shia (Europe), UK.

== Biography ==
Syed Ali Raza Rizvi was born on May 4, 1977, in Lahore, Pakistan. His family moved to Birmingham, England, where he was raised. After completing his primary and secondary education, he started religious studies in Birmingham. He continued religious studies in Qom, Iran. He studied several years in Qom Seminary and graduated in 1998 with dual Masters in Islamic Studies and Arabic.

== Publications ==
Rizvi has written and translated several books. Some of them are:

- Kitab al-Tawhid by Shaykh Saduq (the Book of Divine Unity)
- Introduction to Islam
- Islamic Laws
