= Muhammad Jafar Moravej =

Iranian Ayatollah (1910-1999)

Seyyed Mohammad Jafar Moravej (Persian: سید محمد جعفر مروج) whose complete name/fame is "Seyyed Muhammad Jafar Jazaeri Moravej al-Shariah" (Persian: سید محمد جعفر جزائری مروج الشریعه), was an Iranian Shia scholar who was born in 1910 and died in 1999, in a religious family in Shushtar. His father was Seyyed Muhammad Ali Moravej, and he is among the descendants of Seyyed Nematollah Jazayeri who was a prominent Shia scholar. This Shia scholar is commonly known as "Ayatollah Seyyed Muhammad Jafar Moravej" (Persian: آیت الله سید محمد جعفر مروج).

Seyyed Muhammad Jafar who was also known as "Seyyed Muhammad Jafar Jazayeri/(Mousavi)," finally died in 1999 in the city of Qom. The supreme leader of Iran, Seyyed Ali Khamenei was among the Iranian famous officials who expressed their condolence for the death of this Shia scholar; Iran's supreme leader presented a message about him that: "The demise news of honorable scholar, the blessed Ayatollah Seyyed Muhammad Jafar Mousavi Moravej (Rahmatullah-Alaih) caused me to be regretted. He was among the prominent faqihs ..."

== Teachers ==
Among Seyyed Muhammad Jafar's teachers are:

- Abu l-Hasan al-Isfahani
- Agha Zia Addin Araghi
- Muhsin al-Hakim
- (Sheikh) Musa Khansari
- (Sheikh) Hossein Helli

Etc.

== Works ==
Seyyed Muhammad Jafar Jazaeri Moravej al-Shariah's compilations are more than 50 books, such as:

- Sharh (explanation of) Tahzib
- Sharh-Estebsar
- Sharh Awali al-La'ali
- Sharh Oyun Akhbar-al-Reza
- Sharh Nahj-al-Balaghah
- Qesas-al-Anbia
- Resalee dar sharh hadith lataad
- Resalee dar halq al-lahieh
- Resalee dar al-vatan al-sharee
- Resalee dar elm-e kalam
- Emal al-sebi
- Resalee dar derayah al-hadis
- Takmelah al-vasilah fi al-hodood va al-diat
- Masaeele mostahedese
- Montahi al-derayah fi tozih al-kefayah
- Hadi al-taleb ela sharh al-makaseb
- Sharh orvatol vosqa
- Ziya al-Masalek
- Taliqe bar orvatol vosqa
- Hashie bar tozih al-masaeel
- Resalee dar qaeede la zarar
- Hashie bar vasile al-neja
- Al-qavaeed al-feqhieh
- Resale fi hokm al-hakem fi al-helal
- Hedaye al-anaam
- Al-mabahes osoolieh

== See also ==
- Seyyed Nematollah Jazayeri
- Mohammad Ali Mousavi Jazayeri
