= Mohsen Heidari Alekasir =

Iranian Ayatollah (born 1957)

Ayatollah Mohsen Heidari AleKasir
- محسن حیدری آل کثیر
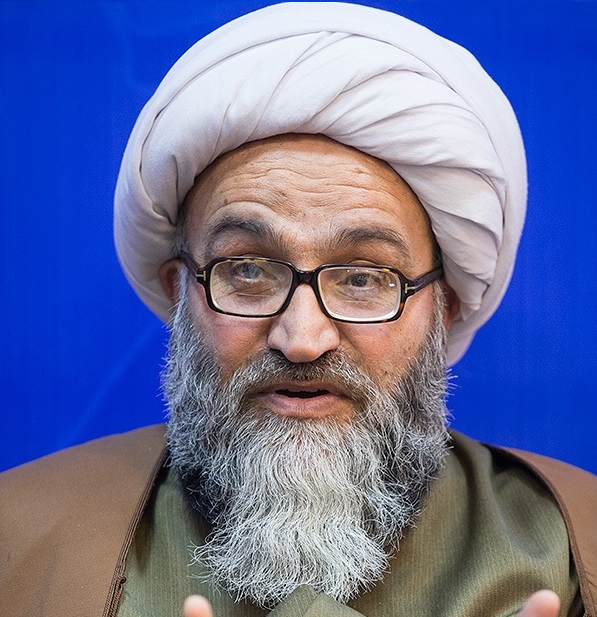
- Ayatollah Mohsen Heidari AleKasir

Member of the Assembly of Experts
- Incumbent
- Assumed office 20 February 2007
- Constituency: Khuzestan Province
- Majority: 332,601 (21.1%)

Personal details
- Born: September 26, 1957 (age 69) Shush, Khuzestan, Imperial State of Iran
- Education: Ahwaz Seminary and Qom Seminary

Religious life
- Religion: Islam
- Denomination: Shi'a
- School: Twelver

Ayatollah Mohsen Heidari AleKasir (Persian: محسن حیدری آل کثیر; born 1957) is an Iranian Shia Islamic cleric and a member of the Assembly of Experts representing Khuzestan Province. He was born into a middle-class rural family in the village of Hor Riyahi Abadi, near Shush in Khuzestan, then part of the Imperial State of Iran.

== Biography ==
Mohsen Heidari Alekasir started his education in Ahwaz seminary, and continued his education in Qom since 1980. He is also one of the current temporary Imams-Jom’ah (the Imams of Friday prayer) of Ahwaz, the capital of Khuzestan province.

== Compilations ==
Ayatollah Heidari AleKasir has scholarly records of research and teaching at seminary and university. He has several compilations, among:

- Qaedeh la Zarar
- Hezb AlaVi and Hezb Umavi
- Welayat al-Faqih Tarikhha wa Mabaniha
- Al-Erhab wal-Unf Ala Dhou al-Quran wa-Sunnah.

== Teachers ==
Mohsen Heidari Alekasir had/has prominent teachers who often are regarded as famous Ayatollahs such as:

- Ayatollah Sobhani,
- Ayatollah Makarem Shirazi,
- Ayatollah Fazil-Lankarani,
- Ayatollah Wahid Khorasani

and other well-known Ayatollahs, among Mirza Jawad Tabrizi, Hashemi Shahroodi, Mousavi Jazayeri, Javadi Amoli, Mesbah Yazdi, Mazaheri, Ma’refat, Khaz’ali and so on. Meanwhile, according to his statement, Ayatollah Sobhani and َAyatollah Mousavi Jazayeri have confirmed his Ijtihad and power on Inference of religious Ahkam (rulings) in writing.

== Viewpoints ==
As some examples of diverse viewpoints of Ayatollah Heidari, he considers making park(s) for women as the best way to provide moral security in the society; additionally, he believes that gender segregation is regarded as the most appropriate gift for women. Meanwhile, several times, he has criticized the related officials due to transferring the water of Karun river to other places which can be led into diverse problems for Khuzestan and other provinces, because it is the serious demand of the Khuzestan people and its authorities that the water of Karun should not be transferred, since the reduction of its water is caused of different problems.
