= Mohammad Ali Mousavi Jazayeri =

Iranian Twelver Shi'a Ayatollah (born 1941)

Ayatollah Sayyid Mohammad-Ali Mousavi Jazayeri
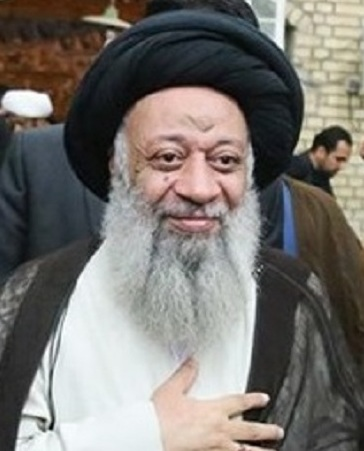

Member of the Assembly of Experts
- Incumbent
- Assumed office 21 May 2024
- Constituency: Tehran province
- Majority: 718,680
- In office 15 August 1983 – 21 May 2024
- Constituency: Khuzestan province
- Majority: 783,004 (39.28%)

Member of the Assembly of Experts for Constitution
- In office 15 August 1979 – 15 November 1979
- Constituency: Khuzestan province
- Majority: 313,118 (17.8%)

Personal details
- Born: 1941 (age 84–85) Shushtar, Iran
- Party: Society of Seminary Teachers of Qom

Ayatollah Sayyid Mohammad-Ali Mousavi Jazayeri (Persian: محمدعلی موسوی جزایری; born 1941) is an Iranian Twelver Shia cleric, who was the representative of Vali-Faqih (Guardianship of the Islamic Jurist) in Khuzestan province from 1983 to 2019. He was elected by the order of Sayyid Ruhollah Khomeini, who was the previous Supreme Leader of Iran.

He was born in Shushtar, Khuzestan province, Iran. He descends from Nematollah Jazayeri as a prominent Shia scholar. Muhammad Ali Mousavi Jazayeri has studied in seminaries of Qom, Iran under Grand Ayatollah Ruhollah Khomeini and Mohammad Ali Araki; and also in seminaries of Najaf, Iraq under Grand Ayatollah Abu al-Qasim al-Khoei.

Meanwhile, Ayatollah Mousavi Jazayeri was considered as (the permanent) Imam al-Jom'ah of Ahvaz beside other (temporary) Imams of Jom'ah of Ahvaz, including:

- Ayatollah Heidari,
- Ayatollah Hassan zadeh,
- Ayatollah Hajati.

== Works ==
Among his (most important) scholarly works are as follows:

- Theses on justice
- Al-Sawm (fast)

== See also ==
- Nematollah Jazayeri
- Muhammad Jafar Moravej
- Abdul-Nabi Mousavi Fard
- List of ayatollahs
