= Ali Shirazi =

Iranian cleric

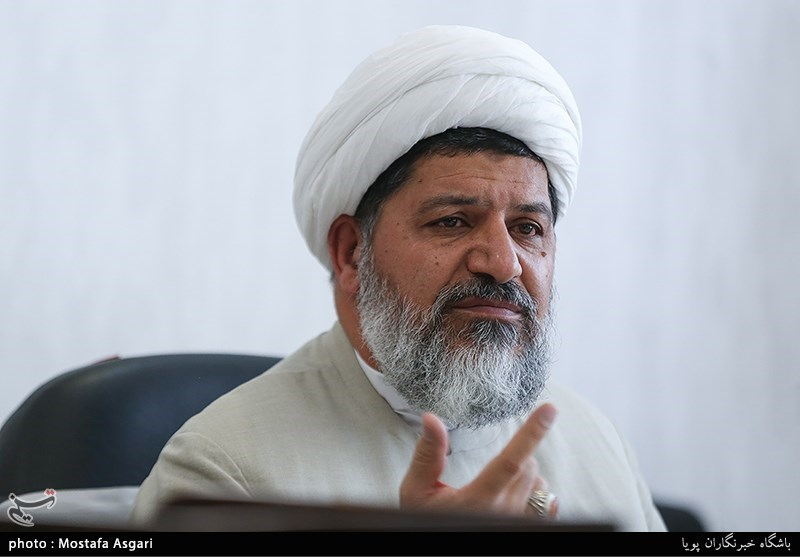
- Born: 22 November 1969 (age 56); Rafsanjan, Iran
- Military career
- Allegiance: Iran
- Branch: Revolutionary Guards; Ministry of Defence and Armed Forces Logistics; Police Command
- Commands: Vali-e-Faqih representative to the Islamic Revolutionary Guard Corps Navy (2002–2011); Vali-e-Faqih representative to the Quds Force (2011–2020); Deputy head of Political Ideological Organization of the Ministry of Defence and Armed Forces Logistics (2021–2025); Head of Iranian Police Ideological−Political Organization (2025–present)

Ali shirazi (Persian: علی شیرازی; born 22 November 1969) is a senior Iranian cleric who is Supreme Leader Ayatollah Ali Khamenei's representative to the Islamic Revolutionary Guard Corps–Quds Force (IRGC-QF). He holds the clerical ranking of Hujjat al-Islam, which is the rank below Ayatollah.

In February 2015, Shirazi said, "We shall not rest until we raise the flag of Islam over the White House." In March 2025 he was appointed as head of the Iranian Police Ideological−Political Organization.
