= Research Institute for Islamic Culture and Thought =

Research institute in Iran

- Abbreviation: IICT
- Formation: 1994
- Type: Research institute
- Headquarters: Modarres Expressway
- Location: Tehran, Iran
- President: Ali Akbar Rashad
- Website: iict.ac.ir

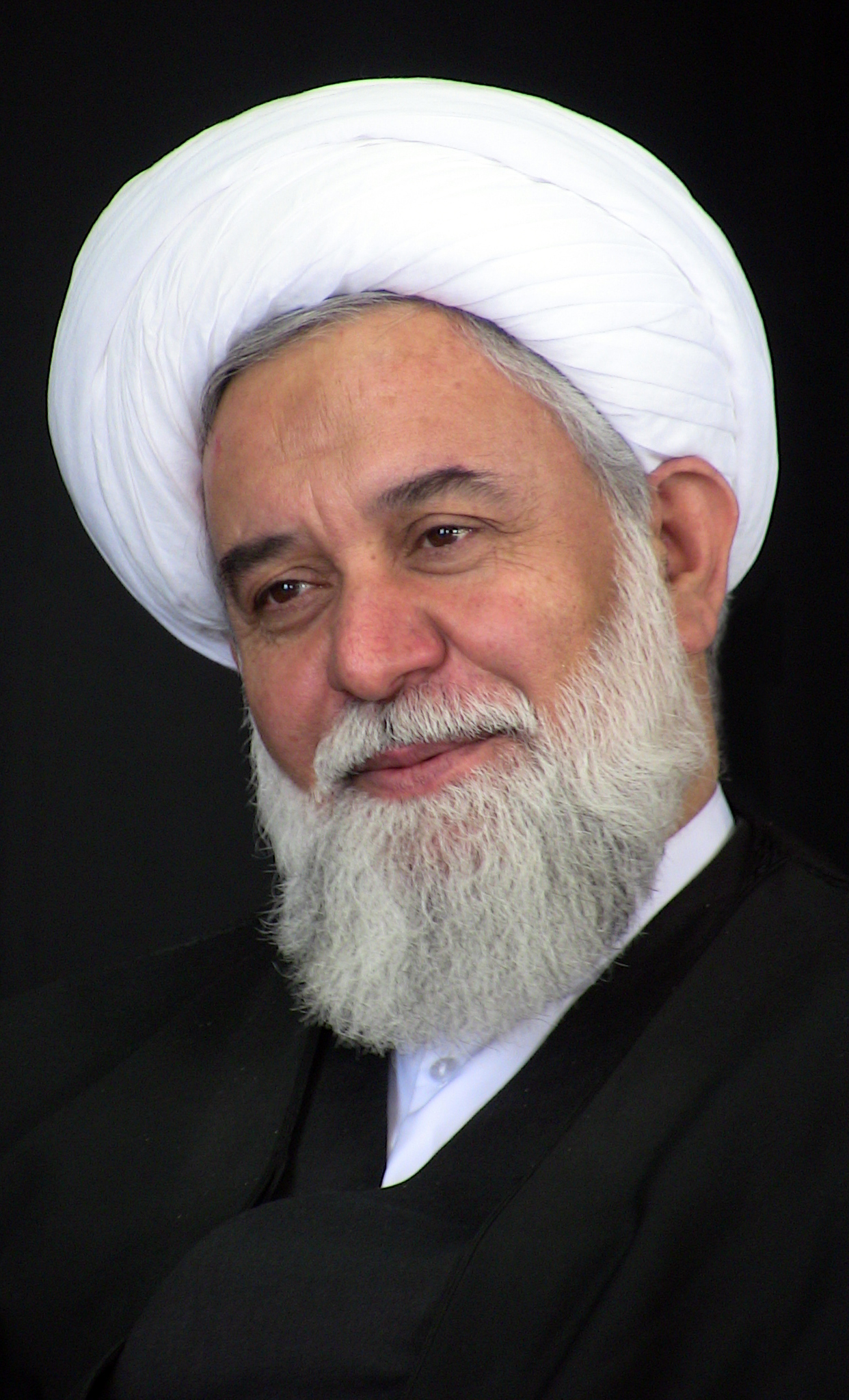
Ali Akbar Sadeghi Rashad, the founder and the president of IICT

Research Institute for Islamic Culture and Thought (Persian: پژوهشگاه فرهنگ و اندیشه اسلامی) is an Iranian Research institute whose main purpose is theorizing on religious thought and enhancing the epistemological bases of the Islamic Revolution. The institute has departments of philosophy, mysticism, and ethics, as well as Western Studies and Islamic economy among others.

== History ==
The Institute was established in 1994 with the confirmation of Iranian Supreme Leader in response to the proponents of Western philosophical schools and religious intellectualism. IICT was created by suggestion of Ali Akbar Rashad, a member of the Supreme Council of the Cultural Revolution, who became the head of the Institute.

== Notable faculty ==
- Mahdi Abbaszadeh
- Abolghasem Alidoust
- Mohammad Arab-Salehi
- Abdolkarim Behjatpoor
- Mohammad Hassan Ghadrdan Gharamaleki
- Mahmoud Hekmatnia
- Seyed Sajjad Izdehi
- Abdol Hossein Khosrow Panah
- Seyed Hossein Mir-Moezi
- Alireza Qaeminia
- Ali Akbar Rashad
- Seyed Kazem Seyed Bagheri

== Journals ==
- Qabasat
- Zehn (Mind)
- Eghtesad-e Eslami (Islamic Economics)
- Hoquq-e Eslami (Islamic Law)
