= Ali Qazi Askar =

Iranian Twelver Shia cleric

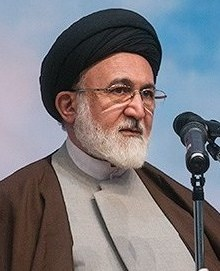

Superintendent of Iranian Hujjaj
- In office 2009–2019
- Appointed by: Ali Khamenei

Imam of Friday Prayer in Isfahan
- In office 1998–2003

Personal details
- Born: 26 May 1954 (age 72) Isfahan, Imperial State of Iran

Seyyed Ali Qazi Askar (Persian: سید علی قاضی عسکر, born 26 May 1954, Isfahan) is an Iranian Twelver Shia cleric who was appointed as the representative of Iran's supreme leader and the superintendent of Iranian Hujjaj (Hajis) by the decree of Seyyed Ali Khamenei; and was in action at the mentioned position for approximately 10 years (since 2009 to 2019).

On 27 March 2022 and by the decree of the Supreme Leader, Ali Khamenei, Ali Ghazi Askar was appointed as the custodian of Shah Abdol-Azim Shrine and its affiliates.

This Shia Ayatollah passed his education period in diverse sections in Isfahan and Qom, and received his doctoral equivalent (second period paper of "Kharej") in 1995. Qazi Askar was also appointed as the temporary Imam of Friday Prayer in Isfahan in 1998, and was active there for 5 years. He also had responsibility at the Bese (Persian: بعثه) of Seyyed Ruhollah Khomeini and Seyyed Ali Khamenei.

There have been published 16 volumes of books, and approximately 50 scientific articles; and had submitted several articles to Hajj international congress in KSA.

== Works ==
Amongst his compilations are:

- Al-Baqi' destruction according to documents (2)
- Tawaf and its importance in narrations
- A Research on Sha'b Abi Talib
- What is Hajj Akbar?

== See also ==
- List of provincial representatives appointed by Supreme Leader of Iran
- Seyyed Abdul Fattah Nawab
