= Student Book of the Year =

- Native name: کتاب سال دانشجویی
- Type: literary award
- Awarded for: Best Author/Best Translator
- Country: Iran
- Presented by: Academic Center for Education, Culture, and Research
- Eligibility: students of Iranian universities
- Established: 1994

The Student Book of the Year is an Iranian cultural festival, organized by the Academic Center for Education, Culture, and Research (ACECR). It awards prizes to books authored or translated by students of Iranian universities. The festival began in 1994 and has been held more than thirty times to date.

== Background ==
The Student Book of the Year Festival was established in 1994 (1373 in the Iranian calendar) with the aim of identifying and introducing student authors and translators, and it has been held continuously ever since. It is a national scientific, cultural event at the university level, and many of its past winners are now among Iranian distinguished professors and researchers.

The main section of the festival welcomes works by students from all academic disciplines, while the special section evaluates works related to the nation’s scientific and cultural priorities. In addition, each year, during the festival, a university professor active in the fields of publishing, writing, or translation is recognized and honored as the “Dedicated Professor of the Book.”

This event serves as a platform for identifying, introducing, and honoring student authors and translators as well as emerging young writers. It also provides an opportunity to foster motivation and strengthen the spirit of research and scholarship among university students. In this festival, works by students and seminary scholars are evaluated in six main categories—Engineering and Technology, Basic Sciences, Humanities, Agriculture and Natural Resources, Medical and Veterinary Sciences, and Art and Architecture—along with a special section. The selected works are then announced and celebrated in an official ceremony.
