= Abdul-Nabi Mousavi Fard =

Iranian Twelver Shi'a cleric (born 1956)

- عبدالنبی موسوی فرد
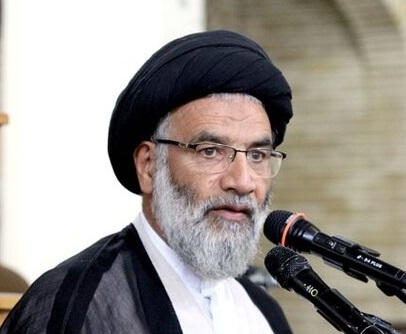

Representative of the Supreme Leader in Khuzestan and Imam Jumu'ah of Ahwaz
- Incumbent
- Assumed office 30 April 2019
- Preceded by: Mohammad Ali Mousavi Jazayeri

Personal details
- Born: 1956 (age 69–70) Jahrom (grew-up in Khorramshahr), Pahlavi Iran
- Education: Qom Hawza

Sayyid Abdul-Nabi Mousavi Fard (Persian: سید عبدالنبی موسوی فرد; born 1956 in Jahrom, grew-up in Khorramshahr) is an Iranian Twelver Shi'a cleric, who has served as the representative of Wali-Faqih (Guardianship of the Islamic Jurist) in Khuzestan province and likewise as the Imam of Friday Prayer of Ahwaz by the order of Sayyid Ali Khamenei, the supreme leader of Iran since 30 April 2019.

Mousavi Fard who is also known as "Hujjatul-Islam Mousavi Fard", went to Qom after Iran-Iraq war (in order to pass his seminary courses). This Shia cleric was previously the Imam of Friday Prayer in the cities of Ramhormoz (for five years) and Khorramshahr in Khuzestan. Afterwards, Seyyed Ali Khamenei appointed him as Wali-Faqih representative in Khuzestan and also Ahwaz Imam Jom'a after the resignation of Seyyed Mohammad Ali Mousavi Jazayeri (on 15 February 2019, due to physical weakness) who was running in these positions before.
