= Iran's Book of the Year Awards =

Annual Iranian literary prize

Book of the Year
- Awarded for: authoring or translating a book
- Country: Iran
- Presented by: Iranian President (managed by Iran Book And Literature House)
- Established: 1983 (revived)
- Website: https://ketabsal.ketab.ir/

Iran's Book of the Year Awards is an annual award for books in categories of religion, social sciences, language, applied sciences, art and literature. It is the most prestigious book award in Iran and is granted by the Iranian president during a ceremony.

== History ==
This award was established in 1953. It was presented by Mohammad Reza Pahlavi at the Salam Nowrouz ceremony. Granting this award was revived in 1983, after the Iranian revolution.

== See also ==
- Student Book of the Year
