= Ahmad Madani =

Iranian politician (1929–2006)

Timsar Seyyed Ahmad Madani
- احمد مدنی
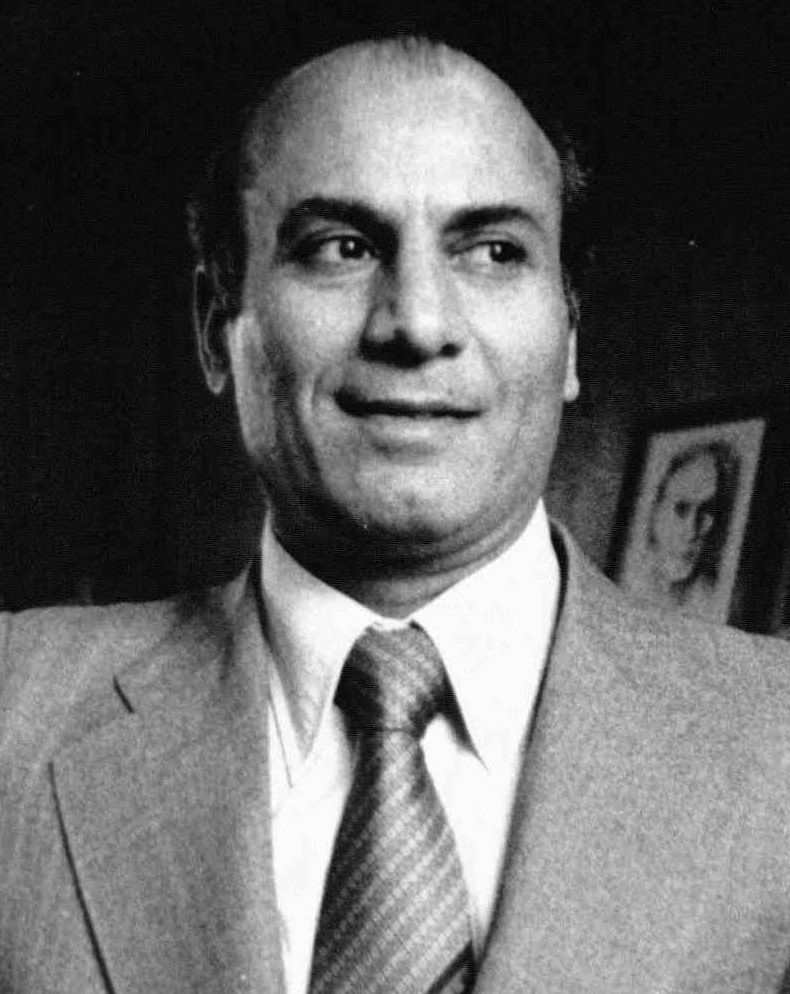
- Madani in 1980

Member-elect of the National Consultative Assembly
- In office Credentials rejected in 1980
- Constituency: Kerman

Governor of Khuzestan Province
- In office 7 April 1979 – 2 January 1980
- Prime Minister: Mehdi Bazargan
- Supreme Leader: Ruhollah Khomeini
- Preceded by: Vacant
- Succeeded by: Mohammad Gharazi

Minister of Defence
- In office 22 February 1979 – 31 March 1979
- Prime Minister: Mehdi Bazargan
- Supreme Leader: Ruhollah Khomeini
- Preceded by: Jafar Shafaghat
- Succeeded by: Taghi Riahi

Commander of the Iranian Navy
- In office 16 February 1979 – 5 January 1980
- Prime Minister: Mehdi Bazargan
- Supreme Leader: Ruhollah Khomeini
- Preceded by: Kamal Habibollahi; Afsari-Pur (acting)
- Succeeded by: Mahmoud Alavi

Personal details
- Born: Seyyed Ahmad Madani; August 1929 Sirjan, Kerman province, Pahlavi Iran
- Died: 12 February 2006 (aged 76) Los Angeles, California, United States
- Party: National Front

Military service
- Allegiance: Pahlavi Iran; Iran
- Branch/service: Navy
- Years of service: 1950–1972; 1979
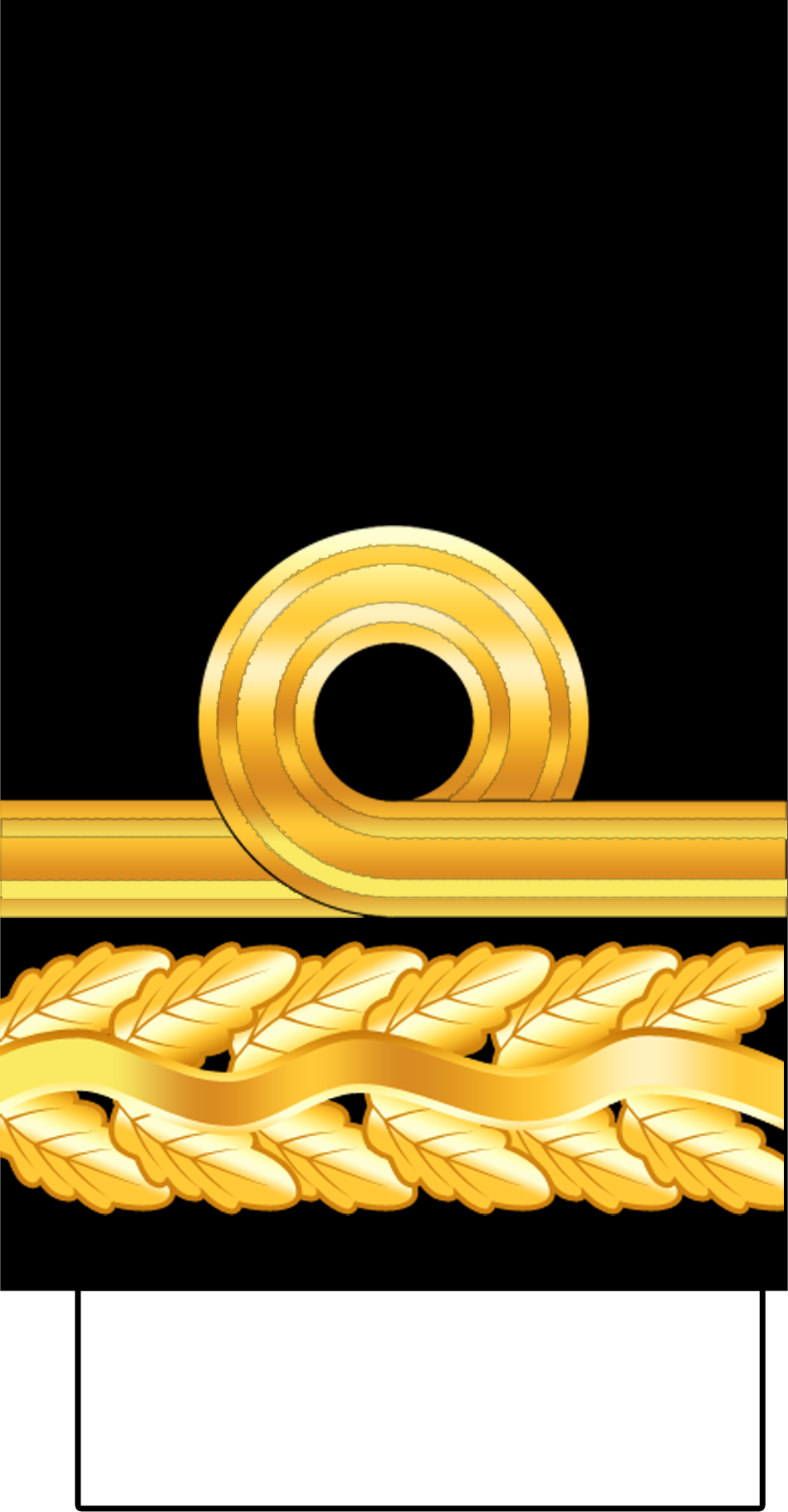
- Rank: Commodore Commodore
- Commands: Bandar Abbas Naval Base (1969–1971)
- Battles/wars: 1979 Azeri rebellion in Iran; 1979 Kurdish rebellion in Iran; 1979 Khuzestan insurgency

Ahmad Madani (Persian: احمد مدنی; August 1929 – 12 February 2006) was an Iranian politician, Commander of the Iranian Navy (1979), governor of the Khuzestan province (1979–80) and candidate in the first Iranian presidential election. Madani became a navy Commodore in 1969, but was removed in 1972. He later became a navy commander after the revolution and was the first ever Minister of Defence under the new regime. Madani was also elected to the first parliament from Kerman, but was not approved. He eventually fled to the United States in 1980.

== Pre-Revolution ==
Ahmad Madani was born in August 1929 in Sirjan.

He grew up in Kerman before returning to Tehran to pursue university education. Madani studied law at the University of Tehran, before joining the Iranian Navy and moving to United Kingdom to continue his education. In 1952, Madani reached the rank of Ensign in the navy, and in 1969 he reached the rank of Commodore.

Madani spent most of his service in Bandar Abbas and the Persian Gulf. He was dismissed from the navy in 1972 for his political activities, and until the 1979 revolution he taught political science and economics throughout various universities in Iran.

== Revolution ==
Following the victory of the 1979 Iranian Revolution, Madani was appointed Minister of National Defence and Commander of the Iranian Navy in the provisional government of Mehdi Bazargan. He resigned as Minister of National Defence after approximately one month. At Bazargan's request, he subsequently served for a period as Governor of Khuzestan province.

Following an uprising in Khorramshahr in 1979, Madani ordered Iranian Army units to deploy to the city.

=== 1980 Presidential Election ===
Madani was a candidate in Iran's first presidential election, held on 25 January 1980. Supported by the National Front, he received 15.72% of the vote and finished in second place.

He placed behind Abolhassan Banisadr and ahead of Hassan Habibi, Dariush Forouhar, Kazem Sami, Sadeq Tabatabaei, Sadegh Ghotbzadeh, Mohammad Mokri, Hassan Ghafourifard, and Hassan Ayat. Madani received the largest share of the vote in the provinces of Kerman, Kurdistan, Sistan and Baluchestan, Hormozgan, and Zanjan.

=== Parliamentary Election ===
In the 1980 election for the first National Consultative Assembly, Madani was elected to represent the Kerman constituency. However, his parliamentary credentials were not approved, and he was consequently not seated as a member of parliament.

== Electoral history ==
Year	Election	Votes	%	Rank	Result
1980	President	2,224,554	15.72	2nd	Lost
1980	Parliament	45,437	59.98	1st	Won

== Exile and death ==
In 1980, Madani discovered that he was accused of communicating with the United States, and thus fled the country. Madani settled in the United States where he was the chairman of the National Front outside of Iran.

Madani died on 12 February 2006 due to cancer, in a Los Angeles hospital.
