= Islamic Human Rights Commission =

Islamic non-profit organisation based in London

- Formation: 1997; 29 years ago
- Type: NGO
- Purpose: Islamic Human Rights
- Headquarters: 202 Preston Road, Wembley, London, UK
- Official language: English
- Key people: Massoud Shadjareh; Saied Reza Ameli; Arzu Merali
- Affiliations: United Nations, European Union, Universal Justice Network, Decoloniality Europe, Convivencia Alliance
- Website: ihrc.org.uk

The Islamic Human Rights Commission (IHRC) is a non-profit organisation based in London. Its stated mission is to "struggle for justice for all peoples regardless of their racial, confessional or political background". The group was established in 1997. Since 2007, the organisation has held consultative status with the United Nations Department of Economic and Social Affairs.

The organisation has been accused of ties with the government of Iran and spreading Islamic extremism in the United Kingdom. In the British government’s independent 2023 review of its Prevent counter-extremism programme, directed by William Shawcross, the final report described the organisation as "an Islamist group ideologically aligned with the Iranian regime, that has a history of ‘extremist links and terrorist sympathies’ ".

The IHRC organises yearly Quds Day rallies, which take place on the last Friday of Ramadan to support the rights of the Palestinian people. Prior to 2019, the marches commonly included the display of Hezbollah flags, a group proscribed as a terrorist organisation in the United Kingdom in 2019.

== Philosophy ==
The IHRC states its philosophy derives from:

Qur'anic injunctions that command believers to rise up in defence of the oppressed. "And what reason have you that you should not fight in the way of Allah and of the weak among the men and the women and the children, (of) those who say: Our Lord! cause us to go forth from this town, whose people are oppressors, and give us from Thee a guardian and give us from Thee a helper." Qur'an 4:75

Jytte Klausen of Brandeis University writes that the IHRC forms part of the organized Muslim community in Europe.

Public intellectual and journalist Stuart Weir wrote that the IHRC is one of the representative voices of Muslims in the UK stating:

...the staff and voluntary workers of the Islamic Human Rights Commission – ... put the lie to the common idea that Islam and human rights are irreconcilable.

== Activities ==
The organisation states it is a campaign, research and advocacy organisation. It also engages in ad hoc and one-off projects.

=== Campaigns ===
The campaigns section features heavily on the organisation's website.

In 2015, it campaigned to repeal anti-terrorism legislation in the UK. Other main campaigns include one for political prisoners in Saudi Arabia. During the 2014 Gaza War, the IHRC held a high-profile campaign to get people to show solidarity with Palestinians by flying a Palestinian flag.

Other campaigns include the ‘Prisoners of Faith’ project, which has included campaigns to release various religious figures from imprisonment for their religious beliefs. Among these are Mu'allim Ibrahim Zakzaky released 1998, Gul Aslan released 1999, Nureddin Sirin, released 2004. The organisation also states the following have been released as a result of their campaigning: Mallam Turi, Zeenah Ibrahim from Nigeria; Sheikh Al-Jamri, Bahrain; Huda Kaya, Bekir Yildiz, Recep Tayyip Erdogan, Nurilhak Saatcioglu, Nurcihan Saatioglu, Turkey; Sheikh Ahmed Yassine, Abdul Aziz Rantissi, Rabbi Biton, Sheikh Abdulkareem Obeid, Mustafa Dirani from Israeli detention; Mohammed Mahdi Akef, Egypt; Dr. Muhammad Osman Elamin, Sudan; Cehl Meeah, Mauritius; Abbasi Madani and Ali Behadj, Algeria.

Previous campaigns for 'Prisoners of Faith' focused on US detainees, and include Omar Abdul Rahman (the perpetrator of the 1993 World Trade Centre bombing), his attorney Lynne Stewart (convicted on charges of conspiracy and providing material support to terrorists in 2005), Ghassen Elashi (convicted of terrorist financing for funnelling $12 million to the Palestinian terrorist organisation Hamas), former Black Panther Imam Jamil Al-Amin (serving a life sentence for murder), as well as Egyptian detainees including Khairet El-Shater, Deputy Supreme Guide of the Muslim Brotherhood in Egypt, released in 2010 and reincarcerated in 2013 after the coup.

Other campaign work includes thematic and country based campaigns e.g. for release of detainees in Bahrain, against brutalisation of immigrant women in France, and against niqāb bans in France, Bosnia, Belgium and Spain.

In 2000 the IHRC "protested against a government-backed European directive, which, according to them, would force Muslim charities and schools to employ non-believers and homosexuals".

IHRC has promoted various boycott, divestment and sanctions actions, including a boycott of Israeli dates in the UK. In May 2010, the IHRC organised and led a delegation of European Muslim organisations to Turkey to lobby the Turkish government to veto Israel's accession to the Organisation for Economic Co-operation and Development.

The bid was unsuccessful as all 31 members of the OECD voted unanimously for Israel’s accession.

Other notable campaigns saw the campaign to have Mat Sah Satray and other ISA detainees in Malaysia released in 2009.

In 2006, IHRC began an emergency campaign against the imminent execution of British and Pakistani dual national Mirza Tahir Hussain. Other organisations, including Fair Trials Abroad and Amnesty International, joined the campaign.

After a BBC documentary broadcast on 15 July 2004 exposed very strong anti-Islamic opinions within the far-right British National Party, the IHRC has campaigned for the prohibition of that party.

=== Advocacy ===
The bulk of IHRC's advocacy work, it claims, is undertaken away from the public glare and involves helping individuals with discrimination cases involving Islamophobia and anti-Muslim racism. Some public testimonies and case reports exist highlighting this section of IHRCs work. In 2004 PhD student Yasir Abdelmouttalib was viciously assaulted in a race hate attack and left severely disabled. His mother states:

'Fortunately... I got support from... Islamic Human Rights Commission (IHRC), the only community group in London with case workers to help Muslim victims of hate crimes like Yasir, and that helped us to pull through'.

On 3 August 2006, the IHRC asked for judicial review of its allegations that the British government assisted with military shipments to Israel, which was eventually denied.

In 2010, IHRC publicly advocated against the introduction of full body scanners at UK ports.

In 2013 it claimed victory in the case, after the British government made a U-turn on the introduction of the full naked body scanners, before the matter came to court. The case, which IHRC supported objected to the scanners on the grounds of:

the dissolution of civil liberties, health issues, the explicit nature of the body scanners and storage of images, as well as the fact that the scanners could not detect plastics and liquids which was given as a reason for their introduction.

In 2014, IHRC Legal, a new section of IHRC was launched, quickly claiming a victory in a discrimination case featuring university lecturer who claimed indirect racial discrimination against his employers. His case was settled out of court.

The advocacy section is also involved in trial monitoring, with observer trips to Turkey, Mauritius and Bahrain featuring in this field.

==== Campaign for release of Abu Hamza al-Masri ====
IHRC's chairman, Massoud Shadjareh criticised the prosecution of Abu Hamza al-Masri in 2006, his extradition in 2012 to the US, and his conviction in 2014 in the US.

IHRC has been deeply critical of the treatment of Abu Hamza al-Masri on various counts. It has highlighted what it calls "double standards" in his treatment by the press, politicians and the legal system, arguing that the case of al-Masri highlighted societal and judicial double standards, averring to the failure to convict British National Party leader Nick Griffin and his colleague in the same week as convicting al-Masri of similar crimes. IHRC's chair, Massoud Shadjareh stated:

Notwithstanding Abu Hamza's controversial character and views, it seems astounding that this week Nick Griffin and his co-defendant from the BNP walked free from court and Abu Hamza has been convicted.

At a time when we are witnessing free speech mania directed at Muslims who have been told to put up with any insult, offence and abuse in the name of free speech, this verdict sends yet another signal that Muslims are not equal in the eyes of the law of this country.

In 2006, a British court found Abu Hamza al-Masri guilty of inciting violence, and sentenced him to seven years' imprisonment. On 5 October 2012, after an eight-year legal battle, he was extradited from the UK to the United States to face terrorism charges and on 14 April 2014 his trial began in New York. On 19 May 2014, Hamza was found guilty of eleven terrorism charges by a jury in Manhattan. On 9 January 2015, he was sentenced to life in prison without the possibility of parole.

==== Campaign for release of Omar Abdel-Rahman ====
The group had campaigned for the release of Omar Abdel-Rahman, the "Blind Sheikh" who was convicted for the 1993 World Trade Center bombing, and was the leader of Al-Jama'a al-Islamiyya, an armed terrorist group in Egypt which is proscribed by the British Government. The IHRC criticised the court's judgment including the use of laws "not used since the American Civil War" to convict Abdel-Rahman.

The organisation also campaigned for the release of Abdel-Rahman's lawyer Lynne Stewart, who was convicted on charges of conspiracy and providing material support to terrorists in 2005, and sentenced to 28 months in prison. Her felony conviction led to her being automatically disbarred. She was convicted of helping pass messages from her client Sheikh Omar Abdel-Rahman, an Egyptian cleric convicted of planning terror attacks, to his followers in al-Gama'a al-Islamiyya, an organization designated as a Foreign Terrorist Organization by the United States Secretary of State.

The Islamic Human Rights Commission presented Stewart with an award for her "fight against Islamophobia" in February 2014.

On Abdel-Rahman's death in 2017, the IHRC described him as "a rare man of principle…[whose] death will only make him a martyr and more of an inspiration."

=== Research ===
==== Hate crimes and discrimination ====
The organisation published several reports which were based on third party reporting of anti-Muslim hate crimes in the UK, including statistics which were published one month after the September 11, 2001 attacks on the World Trade Center in New York and statistics which were published one year after the attacks.

Previously, it had employed basic survey methods to generate statistics for 1999 and 2000.

In 2009–10, it launched a pilot project in the UK and France by using a survey method, resulting in the publication of its findings in Getting the Message: The Recurrence of Hate Crimes in the UK (2011) and France and the Hated Society: Muslims Experiences (2012).

The project was refined and rerun in California, the rest of the US and Canada, resulting in the publication of Once Upon a Hatred: Anti-Muslim experiences in the USA (2013) and Only Canadian: The Experience of Hate Moderated Differential Citizenship for Muslims (2014).

In 2014, the organisation undertook data collection in the UK once more.

==== Country reports ====
IHRC produces country reports on human rights abuses in counties such as Nigeria. It also submits reports to the Universal Periodic Review (UPR) mechanism at the United Nations. The list of countries it has submitted reports on in the period 2007–2010 are: Iraq, China, Egypt, Saudi Arabia, France, Sri Lanka, The Philippines, Tunisia, Morocco, India, Bahrain, United Kingdom.

==== Thematic reports ====
It also produces thematic reports on themes such as hijab and freedom of religious expression, even submitting some of these to UN committees such as the Committee for the Elimination of Discrimination Against Women (CEDAW).

==== Anti-terrorism laws ====
It has also produced several critical works opposing anti-terrorism legislation, particularly in the UK. Its 2006 report 'Anti-terrorism: A Modern day Witch-hunt' by Fahad Ansari was praised by Tony Benn and Bruce Kent. According to Benn:

Scholarly work of this kind helps us by emphasising the importance of Civil Liberties to all communities.

Kent stated it was a:

... most interesting – and shocking – terrorism report... it will do much good.

Further reports, briefings and submissions to the government's consultations tackled various anti-terrorism laws and policies including the CONTEST and PREVENT strategies, moves to remove citizenship from terror suspects, stops and searches, and stops at ports and airports. They have also expressed the importance for 'reform' of Schedule 7 on the basis that it was 'discriminatory' towards Muslims.

In 2014 it produced a response to the UK government's Tackling Extremism in the UK report.

The organisation started 2015 by stating that it was pulling out of the consultative process on the anti-terror laws with the government, claiming that participation only legitimated the raft of unjust laws. It announced this move in conjunction with the launch of its briefing Proposed Counter Terrorism and Security Bill: an Orwellian Possibility.

==== Citizenship ====
In 2004, IHRC launched the British Muslims' Expectations of the Government (BMEG) research project. It culminated in six reports on citizenship, discrimination, education, hijab, law and media and representation. The focus on theoretical aspects of citizenship in this project has become a key theme in IHRC research work. According to Professor D. Ray Heisey, the project:

... examined 1125 responses to a questionnaire and the responses from 52 personal interviews of Muslims living in various cities within the UK. They included a range of respondents in age, education, gender, and economic class... The strength of these studies is in the intercultural approach taken and the comprehensive nature of the investigation in looking at the topics as seen in the literature as well as the results of their extensive array of questions on numerous topics related to their perceptions of the consequences of living in a majority culture. Each volume ends with the views of leading citizens on the given topic and a list of recommendations for the British government to consider at the policy level as a result of the findings.

In addition to the BMEG project, IHRC's research section has used the idea of citizenship as a critical lens through which to discuss social issue. It looks both at the technical specificity of citizenship and its denial (in a crossover of concern with the advocacy and campaigns departments) e.g. on issues of citizenship stripping in countries as diverse as the UK, Bahrain, UAE and Kuwait. It also looks at the sociological implications and discriminatory aspects of citizenship tests as they have developed e.g. in the UK and Germany.

==== Human rights theory ====
Other theoretical work includes papers on human rights discourse, as well as Islam and human rights represented in reports, papers presented at seminars, participation in wider research projects e.g. Trust Building in Conflict Transformation with the Centre for the Study of Radicalisation and Contemporary Political Violence.

=== Collaborative work ===
In 2006, IHRC issued a joint statement signed by various public figures calling for an immediate ceasefire in the Israel-Lebanon war, and calling on the British government to be evenhanded. Signatories included Vanessa Redgrave, various other MPs including David Gottlieb, Ann Cryer, Clare Short, Frank Dobson, Ian Gibson, John Austin and Jeremy Corbyn, as well as various Islamic, Christian and Jewish groups and individuals including Muslim Council of Britain, Jews Against Zionism, Rev Fr. Frank Gelli, Rev Steven Sizer, Roland Rance, and Lord Nazir Ahmed. This statement and IHRC's research work and participation in protest events during the war attracted controversy in the right-wing press (see Controversy and Criticism below).

The IHRC has on a number of occasions organised joint statements with various Islamic groups about British terror legislation, and has collaborated with prominent civil liberties lawyers Gareth Peirce and Louise Christian.

=== Other projects ===
==== Institutional Islamophobia Conference ====
In December 2014, the organisation is organised the conference Institutional Islamophobia, subtitling it 'A conference to examine state racism and social engineering of the Muslim community'. Speakers slated to talk on the day were Hatem Bazian (co-founder of Zaytuna College, and Professor at UC Berkeley), Malia Bouattia – Black Students' Officer at the National Union of Students, author and academic Marie Breen Smyth from the University of Surrey, Ramon Grosfoguel a professor from UC Berkeley, Les Levidow from the Campaign Against Criminalising Communities and Jews for Boycotting Israeli Goods, Richard Haley, the Chair of Scotland Against Criminalising Communities, Peter Oborne, the Chief political commentator of the Daily Telegraph and associate editor of The Spectator, Salman Sayyid the author and academic based at the University of Leeds, AbdoolKarim Vakil who is Chair of the Research and Documentation Committee of the Muslim Council of Britain, and an academic at King's College London, Lee Jasper, former adviser to the London Mayor, and co-chair of Black Activists Rising Against Cuts & National Black Members Officer for the Respect Party, and the organisation's Head of Research, Arzu Merali.

The conference was part of an initiative by Decoloniality Europe where several organised across Europe as part of the International Day Against Islamophobia Initiative, launched on 9 December in Brussels, Belgium.

Two days before the conference was scheduled to take place, Birkbeck, University of London cancelled the organisation's booking for the conference (see Controversies below), forcing the event to be relocated to the P21 Gallery. Birkbeck were roundly criticised for the cancellation with academics and teaching unions protesting the move, claiming that the cancellation was itself evidence of Islamophobia and racism.

==== The New Colonialism: The American Model of Human Rights ====
The New Colonialism: The American Model of Human Rights was a 2018 conference by IHRC, the papers presented at which were published in 2019 in a book of the same name. Speakers at the conference were: Saied Reza Ameli, Laurens de Rooij, Saeed A. Khan, Ramon Grosfoguel, Sandew Hira, Mary K. Ryan, Sohail Daulatzai, Tasneem Chopra and Rajeesh Kumar. The stated aim of the conference and book was to look at how human rights discourse has been co-opted and adulterated by the US in both its domestic and foreign policy.

==== Annual Islamophobia Awards ====
The Annual Islamophobia Awards is the name of a spoof awards ceremony held by the organisation in 2003–2006 and again from 2014 onwards. The organisation seek nominations from the public and open a public voting system to find the 'Islamophobes' of the year from any sector of public life.

In the Islamophobia Awards there are two divisions of awards given, one division is the spoof division given to the public vote for Islamophobes for being 'Islamophobic', the other is given to people who have dedicated their work to tackling Islamophobia and to recognize them.

During the 2003 Annual Islamophobia Awards, Ariel Sharon was announced as the winner of the "Most Islamophobic International Politician of the Year'", for an interview allegedly given in 1956.

The Islamophobia Awards were revived in the 2010s by the organisation and ran from 2013 to 2018.

In 2015, author and commentator Douglas Murray criticised the IHRC for giving French satirical magazine Charlie Hebdo an ‘award’ for Islamophobia, two months after 12 of Charlie Hebdo’s staff were shot dead in an Islamic terrorist attack.

==== Al-Quds Day, UK ====
The commission is one of the organisers of the annual Al-Quds Day event in London.

==== Against Zionism: Jewish Perspectives ====
In 2006, the organisation brought together leading Jewish activists in London, for an international conference, held at SOAS University of London. The papers from the conference were published in English and Turkish. Speakers at the conference included Michel Warschawski, Uri Davis, Rabbi Yisroel Weiss, Rabbi Ahron Cohen, Roland Rance, Les Levidow, Jeffrey Blankfort, Professor Yakov Rabkin, and John Rose.

==== Human Rights and Israel at 60 ====
In 2008, IHRC organised the international conference 'Human Rights and Israel at 60'. Speakers included: Michael Warschawski (Alternative Information Center); Yehudit Keshet (Checkpoint Watch); Daud Abdullah (Palestinian Return Centre); Jennifer Loewenstein (University of Wisconsin); Michael Bailey (Oxfam); Meir Margalit (Israeli Committee against House Demolitions).

==== Convivencia Alliance ====
In 2022, IHRC, alongside the Jewish Network for Palestine and the Peacemakers Trust set up the Convivencia Alliance, an interfaith group setup to help bring about a "just peace in Palestine". The alliance is supported by organisations including Ahlulbayt Islamic Mission, Decolonial International Network, Israeli Committee Against House Demolitions, One Democratic State, The Palestinian Forum in Britain, Scottish Palestine Solidarity Campaign, and Simon Bolivar Institute.

== Controversies ==
=== 2006 Lebanon War ===
During the 2006 Lebanon War, IHRC undertook various actions in opposition to the war and called on the British government to be evenhanded in its treatment of the parties. It issued a briefing entitled 'The Blame Game: International Law and the Current Crisis in the Middle East'. The IHRC also brought a court challenge against the British government over its decision to allow military supply flights from the USA to Israel to land and refuel in the UK. The challenge was unsuccessful.

Melanie Phillips in The Spectator claimed that in the briefing 'The Blame Game: International Law and the Current Crisis in the Middle East', IHRC Chair Massoud Shadjareh asked "his followers" and "British Muslims" to provide financial assistance to Hezbollah, and called for the occupation of Israel and "regime change" by Hezbollah on self-defence grounds. She also highlighted that banners were seen at IHRC demonstrations saying "We are all Hezbollah now".

Israeli professor and historian Ilan Pappe supported the IHRC and its briefing in a letter to the editor of The Spectator, asserting that it was accurate and similar to those "one can find in the annual reports of Amnesty international and the Israeli human rights societies reports", describing Philips' accusations as "vicious and unfounded".

In a 2008 essay, "Brixton, Berkley and Other Roads to Radicalisation", Shadjareh states:

The primary slaughter was of a people of another nation, and for that reason, back in '68, "We were all Ho Chi Minh", and for the same reason in 2006, aside from any other affiliations the authors may have, we authorised IHRC to add its name to the posters of dead and injured Lebanese children during the 33-day war, because then and now, "We are All Hizbullah." The Spectator and various parts of the right wing press declared that this was a sign that an Iranian backed spate of terror attacks on the UK were imminent, citing in particular the posters and IHRC. They failed to note that Hizbullah flags at said demonstrations were sported by many including orthodox Rabbis, and the now infamous banners held by amongst others middle class English women appalled at the slaughter.

=== 2007 Apology from The Sunday Times ===
On 2 December 2007, in The Sunday Times, Shiraz Maher wrote an article entitled "A failure to confront radical Islam". The article claimed that IHRC Chair Massoud Shadjareh, whilst appearing on the Today programme, made moral equivalents between Muslims in Guantanamo Bay and the fate of Gillian Gibbons in Sudan. The Sunday Times subsequently issued a correction, which held that this and other suggestions that Shadjareh had condoned the Sudanese government's actions were "totally untrue", and that he had in fact "condemned outright" Gibbons' treatment by the Sudanese government. Shadjareh brought a libel complaint against the newspaper which he won. The newspaper published an apology and agreed to pay Shadjareh "substantial damages".

=== 2015 Charlie Hebdo award ===
In March 2015, IHRC gave the French satirical magazine Charlie Hebdo their "International Islamophobe of the Year" award, less than two months after 12 members of staff at the magazine had been killed by Islamist extremists. According to The Independent, "The controversial commendation has been branded 'insensitive', as it comes in the wake of the massacre on January 7 this year, in which brothers Saïd and Chérif Kouachi forced their way into the Paris offices and killed a dozen journalists and cartoonists."

The group was also criticised for giving counter extremism campaigner and Muslim Maajid Nawaz its "UK Islamophobe of the Year" award.

=== 2017 Nazim Ali's Grenfell Tower comments ===
In June 2017 after the Grenfell Tower fire, Nazim Ali, a director of the IHRC, was videotaped telling a group of protestors that "It is the Zionists who give money to the Tory party, to kill people in high rise blocks" and "Careful, careful, careful of those rabbis who belong to the Board of Deputies, who have got blood on their hands." Ali later said that The Sunday Telegraph had "not presented what I said accurately in the wider context of what was said in the prelude to the minute's silence for Grenfell. As presented it sounds somewhat inelegant... To say that some of Theresa May or the Tory party's supporters are Zionists is hardly controversial." An attempt by the Campaign Against Antisemitism to bring a private prosecution for inciting racial or religious hatred, was blocked by the Crown Prosecution Service as they determined there was no "realistic prospect of conviction".

=== 2025 Statutory inquiry by the Charity Commission ===
In October 2025 the charities regulator for England and Wales, the Charity Commission, announced it had "escalated its engagement with the charity" by opening a statutory enquiry. This was following earlier engagement over concerns about IHRC's funding of a non-charitable company, and funding for an event at which "inflammatory comments" were allegedly made.

== Criticisms ==
=== Alleged connections with Iranian government and support for Hezbollah ===
According to The Times newspaper, British government officials believe the organisation has direct ties to the Iranian government and Iran's Supreme Council of the Cultural Revolution in Tehran.

In May 2019, a Henry Jackson Society report stated that co-founder and board member of the IHRC Saied Reza Ameli had been promoted to Secretary of the Supreme Council of the Cultural Revolution in Iran.

In 2022 The Times reported that as secretary of the Council, Saied Reza Ameli had played a key role in drawing up the government’s tougher rules on the mandatory wearing of the hijab in Iran while serving as Director of the IHRC in Britain. He said the laws on “chastity and hijab” in 2019, were needed for "social health, protection of the family" and that foreign television shows were designed to “weaken chastity and hijab”.

The investigation also claimed that co-director of the IHRC Azru Merali said in a speech at a 2014 conference that “We know who the enemy is. It’s the West, Nato countries [and] . . . the white supremacist or liberal structure we’re all suffering at the hands of.” The third director of the IHRC, Nazim Ali, speaking at a rally after the Grenfell Tower fire, condemned “Zionists who give money to the Tory party to kill people in high-rise blocks”.

The Iranian-American women’s rights activist Masih Alinejad has described the organisation as a “propaganda tool” of the Iranian government.

According to a 2021 report in The Times, in 2008 the chair of the IHRC, Massoud Shadjareh, who was born in Iran, co-authored a paper in which he wrote: “We are all Hezbollah”, had described the Ayatollah Khomenei as “a torch of light for the whole of mankind”, and said that he “aspired to become like” Iranian General Qasem Soleimani, the head of Iran’s elite Quds Force who was assassinated in a US drone strike in 2020. The IHRC is one of the chief organisers of the yearly pro-Palestine and anti-Israel Quds Day marches.

In February 2024, the IHRC was accused of intimidation after it criticised the opening of a Charity Commission investigation into the Islamic Centre of England, whose Imam, Seyed Hashem Moosavi, is a direct representative of Iran’s supreme leader, Ayatollah Khamenei.

According to the now defunct Awaaz, the IHRC is "a radical Islamist organisation that uses the language of human rights to promote an extremist agenda including the adoption of shariah law". In a 2006 report entitled "The Islamist Right – key tendencies", Awaaz stated the IHRC is part of a corpus of right-wing Islamist and neo-Khomeiniist organisations, a claim which the IHRC rejected. Awaaz's claims were echoed by journalist Melanie Phillips, who stated in The Spectator that the IHRC was, "the most conspicuous promoter of Khomeini jihadism in the UK, ... [and] is said to be close to Iran."

=== Selectivity ===
There is disagreement over the organisation's stance on Muslim countries. Its supporters, including British MPs, US academics and others state that it is a source of good and reliable information for abuses in Bahrain, Saudi Arabia, Sudan, Turkey, Indonesia, Pakistan, Bangladesh and Malaysia.

Anthony McRoy, in his 2006 book From Rushdie to 7/7: The Radicalisation of Islam in Britain writes that

... an interesting aspect of IHRC radicalism is that the group does not restrict criticism of human rights abuses to Western governments... it also condemns 'militant' Islamic regimes, such as Sudan for human rights abuses in Darfur...

In a 2008 article published in the Harvard Human Rights Journal, Eric Heinze writes that:

On the whole, the more oppressive an Islamic state is, and the more it officially propagates pro-Islamic doctrines or institutions, the less likely the Islamic Human Rights Commission has been to criticize it. That approach offends any concept of fairness in the application of human rights.

The pro-Israel Stephen Roth Institute critiqued IHRC's opposition to the Saudi Arabian government, including links it claims the organisation has with UK based Saudi dissident Muhammad al-Mas'ari. The Institute has also stated that the IHRC works with Imam Muhammad al-'Asi (a former imam of the Islamic Centre DC who was removed from his position). The Institute states that al-'Asi and al-Mas'ari have "called on Muslims to kill Jews" (The Institute states Al-'Asi is an American convert, which may be incorrect.)

=== Alcohol investment ===
On 23 August 2013, an article in The Independent reported that the IHRC held shares in the Baa Bar Group, a Liverpool-based bar chain that sells alcoholic beverages. The article contrasted this with the IHRC's own publication that warned people against the use of alcohol, stating that "the greatest underminer and saboteur of discipline and confidence is alcohol and so-called social drinking", and stating that "alcohol is the curse of the oppressed people and a boon for the oppressors. Not only is the oppressor making enormous profits from liquor but it also totally immobilizes and paralyses the critical faculties of the oppressed". The IHRC responded to the article four days later, saying that the shares were a gift from a supporter, who told the charity that they were shares in property. It pointed out that "some considerable time later, we came to know that the company was related to a company that dealt in alcohol, by which time the company had been delisted from the stock exchange, and the shares were deemed almost worthless". It stated that the charity has "sought advice as to how best to dispose of these shares without financially benefiting from this trade".

=== 2024 claim of Zionist financiers ===
On 6 August 2024, Chair of the IHRC, Massoud Shadjareh, published an open letter to Home Secretary Yvette Cooper in which the organisation blamed “Zionist financiers abroad” for “enabling” the British Far-Right.

The IHRC's letter was condemned by the by 50 peers in the House of Lords as "primitive, dangerous and disgraceful antisemitism" The organisation denied the accusation, stating that those peers who had signed the letter had conflated Zionism and Judaism and were being disingenuous, antisemitic and Islamophobic.

== See also ==
- Cairo Declaration on Human Rights in Islam
- Human rights in Muslim-majority countries
