= Sustainable Development Goals and Iran =

The Sustainable Development Goals are a UN initiative.

The Sustainable Development Goals (SDGs), also known as the 2030 Agenda for Sustainable Development, is a set of seventeen global goals for 169 specific areas developed by the United Nations during a deliberative process involving its 193 member states on 25 September 2015. As one of the participants, Iran pledged to carry out the 2030 Agenda.

In December 2016, the Government of the Islamic Republic of Iran held a special ceremony announcing a national education initiative that was arranged by the UNESCO office in Iran to implement the educational objectives of this global program. The announcement created a stir among politicians and Marja' in the country.

== Background ==
The Sustainable Development Goals (SDGs), known as the 2030 Agenda for Sustainable Development, contains a set of seventeen Global Goals for 169 specific areas. This document was prepared by 193 United Nations (UN) Member States, as well as global civil society. The resolution is a broader agreement than the intergovernmental Post-2015 Development Agenda (successor to the Millennium Development Goals). Iran attended that conference, and pledged to carry out the 2030 Agenda.

== Activities ==
According to Al-Monitor, all 192 UN member states must "ensure inclusive and quality education for all and promote lifelong learning" for everyone, regardless of gender, ethnicity, or age, by the year 2030. Based on this document, the Rouhani administration designed its own educational plan called "The Islamic Republic of Iran 2030 National Education Act: Moving Toward Quality Education and Lifelong Learning, "but it hadn't been approved by the Supreme Council of the Cultural Revolution (SCRC). The 2030 Agenda is not the first educational initiative in Iran. Mahmoud Ahmadinejad proposed "The Fundamental Reform Document of Education (FRDE) in the Islamic Republic of Iran" in 2011. Based on Islamic teachings, that initiative sought to "foster monotheist individuals who have faith in God and believe in the Hereafter".

=== UNESCO Category 2 Centre for Nutrition ===
The UNESCO Category 2 centre in Mashhad, funded in 2017, has been discussed in the academic literature as an example of a “capillary approach” to sustainable development, linking local scientific initiatives with broader international cooperation networks. According to the authors, the centre sought to connect universities, civil society organisations and international institutions through projects related to education, scientific diplomacy, gender inclusion and youth participation, contributing simultaneously to SDG 4 (Quality Education), SDG 5 (Gender Equality) and SDG 17 (Partnerships for the Goals). The study further argued that these initiatives involved cooperation not only with actors from the Global South but also with institutions in the Global North, including the United States, reflecting UNESCO’s multilateral framework. However, the authors also noted that the raise of geopolitical tensions, sanctions regimes and fragmented monitoring mechanisms frequently limited the measurable long-term impact of these programmes and complicated evaluation of their effectiveness within the SDG framework.

== Reception ==
=== Ali Khamenei ===
On 7 May 2017, the Iranian Supreme Leader, Ayatollah Ali Khamenei, criticized the 2030 National Education Act, saying:

It is the Islamic Republic here! Here, Islam is the benchmark! The Quran is the benchmark! It is not a place where the deficient, destructive, and corrupt Western lifestyle can infiltrate! ... The UNESCO 2030 education agenda and the like are not agendas that the Islamic Republic of Iran should have to surrender and submit to.

He also questioned why so-called international organization under the influence of big powers were making educational decisions for countries with differing histories and cultures.

=== Mohammad Mehdi Zahedi ===
According to Iranian politician Mohammad Mehdi Zahedi, the subject of Human rights in the 2030 Agenda is based on American concepts, which, he said, were far from the ideal of human generosity. He declared that Islam does emphasize gender justice and that there was no way to measure gender equality. He added that Iranians believe that any educational initiative must be based on Islamic tradition, because the Quran clearly speaks about education, but the 2030 Agenda strongly recommended that learning religious tradition and beliefs should not be emphasized in public education.

=== Grand Ayatollah Naser Makarem Shirazi ===
On 22 May 2017 Grand Ayatollah Naser Makarem Shirazi brought up the 2030 UNESCO document during a lecture for seminary students in the holy city of Qom. Describing many of the document's goals as "beautiful and humane", Makarem Shirazi said, meaning that it would "consolidate the hegemonic system". He also reiterated Rouhani's comments about adopting the document as long as it did not interfere with Iran's religion and culture and said, "They [the Rouhani administration] have put this in writing and sent a letter, signed by three ministers, to the supreme leader and sent a copy of it to us as well. However, they seem to have forgotten that the creators of this document will only agree to those exceptions and conditions written below it that do not oppose the spirit of the document." He also stated that the 2030 Agenda was full of words that must be interpreted in their way; for example, the word "family" was used in the Agenda refers to all kinds of families, including same-sex couples. In addition, due to the meaning represented for violence, Basij (The Organization for Mobilization of the Oppressed, one of the five forces of the Islamic Revolutionary Guard Corps) and the IRGC have to be considered examples of violence.

=== Hassan Rahimpour Azghadi ===
According to Hassan Rahimpour Azghadi, a member of the Supreme Council of the Cultural Revolution, last year UNESCO said it was committed to the goal that the 2030 Agenda be implemented in all countries, although participation was apparently voluntary, and that it was up to each government to carry out this educational Agenda by the year 2030. The Ministry of Foreign Affairs (Iran) stated that implementation of the 2030 Agenda was not obligatory, but that if the Agenda was not carried out, the government would be found negligent. Some people believe the 2030 Agenda is an example of cultural JCPOA, which produces nothing except treading on the rights of the people. According to the contents of the 2030 Agenda, it finds similarities between Islamic views and Liberal or Neo-liberal views about children's rights and the education of women and family, but there are essential paradoxes. We do not say all the contents of the 2030 Agenda are contrary to Islam, definitely there are matters that correspond to Islamic tradition, so we don't disagree with all of this Agenda, but the problem is, why was this document (which goes against Islam in some articles) signed by neglecting the "upper document"? Due to the 2030 Agenda Sex education for children is their right, but teaching sexual abstinence and modesty is treading on their rights. Based on the 2030 Agenda we have to answer to western educators about how the Agenda is being implemented in our schools. In signing the document, we had agreed that sex education for children guarantees the health of the family and that homosexuality is one of the basic rights of humans. The parameters of training a child are based on secularism. According to the 2030 Agenda foreign advisers must control education in Iran.

=== Hajar Tahriri Niksefat ===
Hajar Tahriri Niksefat, the head of the women's committee in the election headquarters of the town of Raisi in the northern Gilan province, said she believed that educating children regarding gender equality was "not necessarily to the child's benefit, but could also be oppressive." She added, "In our country, family, marriage, controlling sexual desire, and satisfying it through proper channels are emphasized and taught at their appropriate time. We will not consider relations that in our national and religious teachings are viewed as improper, and we do not think it is fit to teach them in our schools."
