= 1980 Iranian presidential election =

- 25 January 1980
- Registered: 20,993,643
- Turnout: 67.42%
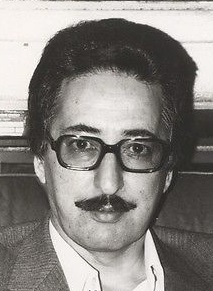

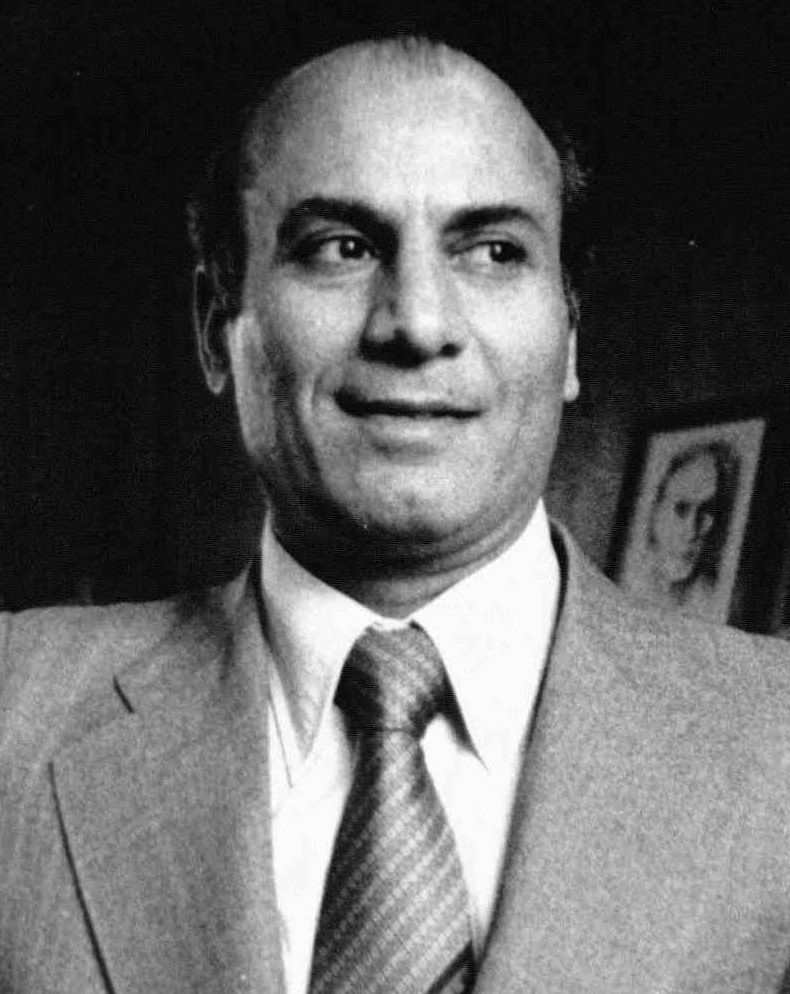
Nominee	Abolhassan Banisadr	Ahmad Madani
Party	Independent (Note: Abolhassan Banisadr was considered an Islamic-liberal and was in a centrist position among Secularists/Liberals and Islamists/Conservatives.)	Independent (Note: National Front member.)
Popular vote	10,709,330	2,224,554
Percentage	75.6%	15.71%
- Results by Province; Banisadr: 40–50% 60–70% 70–80% 80–90% >90% Madani: 60–70%
Elected President
Abolhassan Banisadr
Independent

Presidential elections were held for the first time in Iran on 25 January 1980, one year after the Iranian Revolution when the Council of the Islamic Revolution was in power. Abolhassan Banisadr was elected president with 76% of the vote.

== Candidates ==
The number of the candidates registered to run for the presidency was 124, but only 96 of them were allowed to run. There were only 8 candidates with ballot access and the rest of candidates were write-in.

=== Candidates with ballot access ===
Party nominees

- Hassan Habibi (Islamic Republican Party)
- Dariush Forouhar (Nation Party)
- Kazem Sami (JAMA)

Non-partisan candidates

- Abolhassan Banisadr
- Ahmad Madani (National Front member)
- Sadeq Tabatabaei (Freedom Movement member)
- Sadegh Ghotbzadeh (Freedom Movement member)
- Mohammad Mokri (National Front member)

=== Withdrew ===
- Hassan Ayat (Independent; Islamic Republican Party member), endorsed Jalaleddin Farsi
- Jalaleddin Farsi (Islamic Republican Party nominee), ineligible to run for the office due to his Afghan origin
- Sadegh Khalkhali (Independent), endorsed Abolhassan Banisadr
- Massoud Rajavi (People's Mujahedin of Iran nominee), forced to withdraw for opposing the Islamic Republic constitution

=== Declined to run ===
- Ruhollah Khomeini, incumbent Supreme Leader of Iran
- Mohammad Beheshti, incumbent Chief Justice of Iran
- Mehdi Bazargan, former Prime Minister of Iran

== Endorsements ==
Organization	Candidate
Combatant Clergy Association	Abolhassan Banisadr
Society of Seminary Teachers of Qom	Hassan Habibi (Replaced Abolhassan Banisadr)
Islamic Republican Party	Hassan Habibi (Replaced Jalaleddin Farsi)
Freedom Movement of Iran	None
Tudeh Party of Iran	Hassan Habibi
Nation Party of Iran	Dariush Forouhar
Revolutionary Movement of Muslim People of Iran	Kazem Sami
People's Mujahedin of Iran	None (Initially Massoud Rajavi)
Democratic Party of Iranian Kurdistan	None (Initially Massoud Rajavi)
Organization of People's Fedaian Majority and Minority	None (Initially Massoud Rajavi)
Movement of Militant Muslims	None
Socialist Workers' Party of Iran	Babak Zahraei
Fada'iyan-e Islam	Abolhassan Banisadr
Islamic Association of Teachers of Iran	Abolhassan Banisadr

== Election results ==
Abolhassan Banisadr was elected as president.

=== Nationwide ===
1980 Iranian presidential election
Party	Candidate	Votes	%
Independent	Abolhassan Banisadr	10,709,330	75.6
Independent (Note: National Front member)	Ahmad Madani	2,224,554	15.71
Islamic Republican Party	Hassan Habibi	674,859	3.35
Nation Party	Dariush Forouhar	133,478	0.94
Independent (Note: Freedom Movement of Iran member)	Sadeq Tabatabaei	114,776	0.81
JAMA	Kazem Sami	89,270	0.63
Independent	Sadegh Ghotbzadeh	48,547	0.34
Other candidates		2,110	0.01
Valid votes		13,994,814	98.93
Blank or invalid votes		151,806	1.07
Totals		14,146,620	100
Voter turnout		67.42	
Sources: Nohlen et al and Iran Social Science Data Portal

=== Tehran ===
#	Candidate	Votes
1	Abolhassan Banisadr	1,833,197
2	Ahmad Madani	553,557
3	Hassan Habibi	90,228
4	Sadeq Tabatabaei	28,676
5	Kazem Sami	24,676
6	Dariush Forouhar	22,221
7	Sadegh Ghotbzadeh	12,207
8	Mohammad Mokri	299
9	Mahmoud Seirafizadeh	169
Others		<100
