= Cultural Revolution in Iran =

Purging of non-Islamic influences among academia after the 1979 Islamic Revolution

The Cultural Revolution (Persian: انقلاب فرهنگی, romanized: Enqelāb-e Farhangi; 1980–1983) was a period following the Iranian Revolution, when the academia of Iran was purged of Western and non-Islamic influences (including traditionalist unpolitical Islamic doctrines) to align them with the revolutionary and political Islam. The cultural revolution sometimes involved violence in taking over the university campuses, as higher education in Iran had many secular and leftist forces who were opposed to Ayatollah Khomeini's Islamic state in Iran. The official name used by the Islamic Republic is "Cultural Revolution".

Directed by the Cultural Revolutionary Headquarters and later by the Supreme Council of the Cultural Revolution, the revolution initially closed universities for three years (1980–1983) and after reopening banned many books and purged thousands of students and lecturers from the schools. The resistance against Islamists' control at many universities was largely unsuccessful. How many students or faculty were killed is not known.

The government's process of censoring foreign influences has not been without consequences. In addition to interrupting the freedom, education and professional livelihood of many, and striking "a major blow to Iran's cultural and intellectual life and achievement," it contributed to the emigration of many teachers and technocrats. This loss of job skills and capital weakened Iran's economy.

== Aftermath of the 1979 Revolution ==
In the early years of the revolution, cinemas were either burned or shut down, and both Iranian and Western pop music were banned (although Iranian and Western classical music, as well as Iranian folk music, were allowed). Public spaces became strictly segregated by gender, and dress codes were enforced for both men and women, with women facing much stricter restrictions. During the Pahlavi period, dress was regulated at the state level, with traditional Iranian dress being discouraged and outlawed as it was thought to be an antiquated practice by the Shah. After Pahlavi abdicated, the men and women of Iran had the freedom to dress how they chose, with many educated women choosing not to wear veils. The Cultural Revolution once again mandated specific dress expectations, most intensely impacted women. The hijab became mandatory for women and girls, beginning at 6 despite previous conservative norms being age 9, which is considered the age of religious maturity. Resistance of these girls and women prolonged the implementation of this demand for several years, although women to this day continue to be shamed, harmed or killed for disobeying the public hijab expectations. The hijab became required for women to access the world outside of their homes, and simultaneously, women's legal rights in Iran were stripped. The demonstrations of school children elicited an aggressive response from the state, where young girls were targeted inside of their schools for their disobedience to behavioral and physical expectations. Men also had requirements regarding their appearance, with Western forms of dress such as neckties no longer encouraged and certain traditional hairstyles expected. The necktie was seen as a declaration of non-Muslim faith and opened men up to intimidation tactics from groups such as the Hezb-Allah party. Censorship was strictly implemented, and schools were required to prioritize religious education, with recognized religious minorities permitted to include their own faith teachings.

Since February 1979, and prior, universities in Iran had been important sites for political and ideological debates. Upon his return, Ruhollah Khomeini praised student activists for their opposition to the Shah. In the early months following the revolution, the Islamic Republic Party (IRP) held significant influence within the universities, winning a dominant position in student elections. However, by early 1980, leftist groups including the MEK had replaced the IRP in these elections.

During the electoral campaign, the Revolutionary Council identified the universities as centers of counter-revolutionary activity. Khomeini asserted that "all the major problems of the last fifty years" could be linked back to the universities, which, he claimed, had been a breeding ground for the "gharbzadegi" (Westernization) virus, spread by academics, "liberals, and other intellectuals." Specific areas of academia were targeted and restricted, such as the rapidly modernized archaeological department at the University of Tehran during the 1970s. Updated practices of archaeology put a focus on comprehensive understanding of past teachings of different ethnicities and had an emphasis on field work during the education process in universities. Archaeologists of the time were viewed by the Islamic regime as being either pro-Muslim Nationalists, or anti-Muslim Marxists, depending on the teachings aligning with the expected Shia law. The field of archaeology was significant because it could be weaponized and intentionally misrepresented to "justify systematic discrimination and oppression". On 18 April 1980, after Friday prayers, Khomeini gave a speech harshly attacking the universities.

We are not afraid of economic sanctions or military intervention. What we are afraid of is Western universities and the training of our youth in the interests of West or East.

His remarks are thought to have "served as a signal for an attack that evening on the Tehran Teachers Training College" by his supporters, the Hezbollahi. One student was reportedly lynched, and according to a British correspondent, the campus was left looking like an "a combat zone." The next day, Hezbollahis ransacked left-wing student offices at Shiraz University. Some 300 students required hospital treatment. Attacks on student groups also took place at Mashad and Isfahan Universities." Attacks continued on 21 April and the next day at the Universities at Ahwaz and Rasht. Over 20 people lost their lives in these university confrontations. Recorded documents written by members of the Supreme Council of the Cultural Revolution and other organizations, discuss students and faculty at the universities of Iran, categorizing them as Muslim or a problematic non-Muslim, although this label more so identified them as a cooperative Hezbollahi person or not. Increased pressure would be put on non-compliant professors, including the threat of the loss of employment, public violence or death. Extensive documentation was kept on lecturers, manually recorded during frequent meetings by participants such as the Islamic Association of Students. These recordings come from meetings held at the University of Tehran's Faculty of Literatures and Humanities, discussing topics such as the regime and revolution, Shia law, the oppression of students and faculty, and how to engage young people against the "leftists" within the educational space. The universities closed soon after the April confrontation for Islamization. They were not to open for another two years."

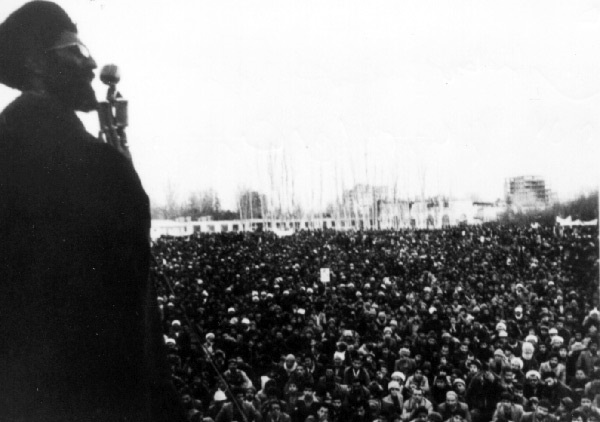
Khamenei during Iranian revolution

== Islamization of universities ==
The Islamization of universities is considered in 3 separate phases. The first is regarded as the Revolutionary Era, beginning with the 1979 Revolution and continuing through the Iran-Iraq war, and included the implementation of policies that resulted in the closing of universities to purify them from Western influences. Institutions transformed during this time, reflecting Islamic values and expectations. The next phase, the "Construction and Reform Era", saw less influence from the State and allowed the universities limited freedoms. During this time, there was an expansion of enrollment in universities as a greater emphasis on qualified lecturers resurfaced with Rafsanjani's government. The expansion of enrollment once again rose again during the Khatami government. Despite these movements forward in education, the opposition from Iran's supreme leader persisted. The final phase, referred to as the "Hard-Liner Era", saw a return of the heavy influence of Islamization required by the state under Ahmadinejad. Higher education continued to grow in number, but restrictions that were withdrawn during the Reform Era saw its return. University presidents were selected by the state, fundamentalist faculty replaced tenured staff, and gender based restrictions were heavily implemented. Students could be targeted by the "ministry of science, research, and technology", MSRT for the activism, and students could be held back if they did not publicly support the regime. This, combined with the purification of curriculum taught in universities, made a significant impact on the quality of education. This era is largely considered the second Cultural Revolution in Iran. Despite the decades long efforts of the regime, the complete Islamization of Universities within Iran is not considered entirely successful. The main theme of the movement was to purify the universities and education system of foreign influences and remains a priority to this day. In his original letter, Khomeini wrote: Set yourselves free from any " –ism" and " –ist" belonging to the East and the West. Be self-dependent and do not expect any help from the foreigners.

After shutting down the universities on 12 June 1980, Khomeini issued a letter, stating:

The need for Cultural Revolution which is an Islamic issue and demand of the Muslim nation has been recognized for sometimes but so far no effective effort has been made to respond to this need and the Muslim nation and the devoted and faithful students, in particular, are concerned and are worried of the machinations of plotters, which every now and then become evident and the Muslim nation are worried that God forbidden the opportunity is missed and no positive action is taken and the culture remains the same as the time of the corrupt regime which the cultured officials put these important centers under the disposal of colonialists. Continuation of this disaster which is, unfortunately, the objective of some the foreign oriented groups would deal a heavy blow to Islamic Revolution and Islamic Republic and any indifference towards this vital issue would be great treason against Islam and the Islamic country.

The "Committee for Islamization of Universities" carried out the task by ensuring an "Islamic atmosphere" for every subject from engineering to the humanities. The headquarters deleted certain courses such as music as "fake knowledge," and committees "came to similar conclusions concerning all subjects in the humanities such as law, political sciences, economy, psychology, education and sociology". In its early stages, the committee included academics such as Abdolkarim Soroush, although he would later become a strong critic of the authoritarian path taken by the Islamic Republic.

The 1979 Revolution gave power to a number of "religious intellectuals" who were charged with redefining educational policies and media within the new Islamic framework. When the institutions reopened, purges continued for five more years with special focus on "Islam’s enemies". Students were screened by committees and those found unfit were not allowed to continue their studies. Students in the University instructor program, for example, "were required to be practicing Muslims, to declare their loyalty to ... the doctrine of the vice regency of the faqih. Non-Muslims were required to refrain from behavior 'offensive to Muslims,' and were excluded from all fields of study except accounting and foreign languages."

In 1981, mobs in Tehran and other provinces began randomly assaulting university campuses. They beat and injured students, expelled leftists from their offices and paramilitary bases, and subsequently took control of the campuses. Outside of the universities, the Cultural Revolution affected some non-academic cultural and scientific figures who it publicly denounced, and the broadcasts of Iranian radio and television, which were now limited to religious and official programs.

=== Expulsion of Baháʼí students and professors from universities ===
“in universities, both at the time of entry and during studies, whenever it is established that someone is a Baháʼí, they must be expelled from the university.” -- the Supreme Revolutionary Cultural Council

After the Cultural Revolution, all Baháʼí students and professors were expelled from the country’s universities, and since then, Baháʼí applicants have been prevented from enrolling in higher education or being employed as university faculty. According to a confidential directive of the Supreme Revolutionary Cultural Council concerning the Baháʼís, “the system’s treatment of them should be in such a way that their progress and development are blocked,” and furthermore, “in universities, both at the time of entry and during studies, whenever it is established that someone is a Baháʼí, they must be expelled from the university.”

Although this directive is classified, in 2018 the Administrative Court of Justice referred to it when ruling that the complaint of an expelled Baháʼí student was invalid, stating that “Baháʼí citizens, in addition to being barred from employment in government institutions, are also deprived of the right to education in Iran.”

=== Influence ===
The Cultural Revolution united the theological schools in Qom with state universities and brought secular teachers to Qom for a time. This had the unexpected result of exposing many students in Qom to Western thought so that it is possible to find "Islamic scholars and teachers of theology who know something of contemporary Western thought and philosophy."

Another aspect was that many teachers, engineers, economists, doctors, and technocrats left Iran to escape the Cultural Revolution. This ongoing degradation of the quality of education within Iran is referred to as a "brain drain", with studies showing an average of 150,000 Iranians leaving the country yearly. The restrictions on employment opportunities afforded to women in Iran contribute to this mass exodus of young people, with female students consistently outnumbering male students in higher education in the country. While the revolution achieved its goal of ridding the universities of Western influence, it also greatly weakened Iran in the fields of science and technology needed for development.

The introduction of materials from across the world and their translations made a significant impact on the culture of Iran, introducing foreign concepts and bridging gaps between different Eastern and Western cultures and Iran. Translated materials were used as a tool to help modernize Persia during the 1900s, primarily focusing on Western literature but eventually morphing into introductions of Western principles. For more than 20 years prior to the 1979 Revolution, there was a significant increase in the American materials translated and distributed throughout Iran, as well as the adaptation of Persian writers to American forms of writing. This also established a connection between Iranian and Western cultures, allowing for a quality access to the world's literary classics. The 1979 Revolution necessitated a censuring of foreign media imported into Iran from Western countries, such as the "changing of taboo terms, or replacement, omission, toning down, or substituting" of materials that are not aligned with Islamic values. The Islamic Republic of Iran Broadcasting (IRIB) regulates foreign translations as the exclusive state media corporation in the nation. The chief of IRIB is selected by the Supreme Leader, and radio and television contents, along with these translations, are carefully, although not consistently, aligned with Islam. Certain Western concepts are altered before airing, such as references to the sexualization of bodies, sex, criminal activities, certain religious concepts, drug usage and more.

== 1981–1982 executions ==
Between June 1981 and March 1982, the government of Iran carried out the largest political massacre in the country's history. This took place as part of the Cultural Revolution in Iran decreed by Ruhollah Khomeini on 14 June 1980, with the intent of "purifying" Iranian society of non-Islamic elements. The primary objective of this religious campaign was to eliminate “anti-Islamic” elements from public institutions, particularly targeting communists and members of the People's Mojahedin Organization of Iran. This campaign led to the enforced closure of universities between 1980 and 1983. Ayatollah Khomeini regarded these institutions as centers of “corruption” and as “strongholds and operational headquarters of the communists.” The Islamic Cultural Revolution consequently involved the systematic suppression of leftist intellectuals, widespread arrests and persecution of political activists, and the public execution of several Marxists.

Initiated by an order from Ayatollah Khomeini on 14 June 1980, the revolution aimed to "purify" higher education by removing Western, liberal, and leftist elements, leading to the closure of universities, the banning of student unions, and violent occupations of campuses. During this period, Shi’a clerics imposed policies to Islamize Iranian society, including mandatory hijabs for women, the expulsion of critical academics, the suppression of secular political groups, and the persecution of intellectuals and artists. According to official records the Iranian government labeled all its political opponents as "moharebs," "mufsids," counterrevolutionaries, "hypocrites," terrorists, "apostates," or pro-Western mercenaries. State-sponsored violence was not directed at a single group but aimed to eliminate a wide range of political ideologies that could challenge the state. These included liberals, nationalists, ethnic minorities, communists, Mujahedin-e Khalq (the largest opposition group), socialists, social democrats, monarchists, or followers of the Bahá'í Faith.

== Institutions of the revolution ==
The Cultural Revolution Headquarters was established on 12 June 1980, and charged by Ayatollah Khomeini with making sure that the cultural policy of the universities was based on Islam, that selected professors were "efficient, committed and vigilant," and dealing with other issues relevant to the Islamic academic revolution.

It was continued by the Supreme Cultural Revolution Council in December 1984. It was described as "the highest body for making policies and decisions in connection with cultural, educational and research activities within the framework of the general policies of the system and considered its approvals indispensable." The body is not stipulated in the Constitution but "was formed under the special circumstances that were prevailing in the early stages of the revolution. The council took its legitimacy from the 9 December 1984 decree of the founder of the Islamic Republic."

This group of seven (in 1980–83) and then 17 (in 1984) that was later expanded to 36 in 1999 was expected to compile and organize all the cultural policies of the country. Hojjatol-Islam Mohammad Khatami was appointed as a member of the High Council for Cultural Revolution in 1996 and became its head in 1997. Mahmoud Ahmadinejad became the head of the Council in 2005, succeeding Khatami; Grand Ayatollah Ali Khamenei has oversight over the Council.

The Council was active in repressing the student movement of 1983–1989, "banning many books and purging thousands of students and lecturers." The council controls the affairs of the universities and their students by supervising the selection of applicants to the university and by controlling the formation of collegiate institutions.

Since 2001, the Council has frequently called for or demanded either outright state control or governmental filtering of the internet to prevent the dissemination of blasphemy, insults to Iran's Supreme Leader, opposition to the Constitution, the creation of "pessimism and hopelessness among the people regarding the legitimacy and effectiveness of the [Islamic] system", and similar offensive content.

== Officials and founders ==
Some 700 University professors from Iran's academic institutions in a short time.

| Name | Title |
|---|---|
| Ruhollah Khomeini | Co-founder |
| Ali Khamenei | Co-founder and head of the council |
| Mohammad Javad Bahonar | Council members |
| Ahmad Ahmadi | Council members |
| Jalaleddin Farsi | Council members |
| Mehdi Golshani | Council members |
| Hassan Habibi | Council members |
| Ali Shariatmadari | Council members |
Abdolkarim Soroush
| Mostafa Moin | Minister of Science |
Hassan Arefi

== Current work ==
The Cultural Council continues ensuring that the education and culture of Iran remain "100% Islamic", per Khomeini's mandate. In 2006, there were rumors of universities internally "bracing" for "tighter state control over student bodies and faculties and perhaps even the second ‘Cultural Revolution.'" This came after Ahmadinejad was elected as Iran's president in 2005 and became the head of the Council. It has resulted in either dismissal or compulsory retirement for veteran university faculty members and their replacement with younger professors more loyal to the Islamic Republic. Many students have been harassed and occasionally incarcerated for writing against or speaking against the government and its policies. The repressive focus on the academy stems from the history of Iranian schools and universities serving as the hotbeds of political opposition, particularly during the beginning of Reza Shah's government.

The Council and its subordinate institutions have been adopting more progressive policies in a departure from certain instances in the past. In the year 1987, there was the creation of the Social and Cultural Council of Women. This agency aggressively defended women's rights and eliminated restrictions that were previously imposed by the High Council of the Cultural Revolution.

== Members ==
The Cultural Council has 41 members, most of whom hold other government posts as well.

1. Hassan Rouhani
2. Sadeq Larijani
3. Ali Larijani
4. Ali Jannati
5. Hassan Hashemi
6. Ahmad Masjid Jamei
7. Mohammad Farhadi
8. Ali Asghar Fani
9. Mahmoud Goudarzi
10. Sorena Sattari
11. Mohammad Bagher Nobakht
12. Shahindokht Molaverdi
13. Abdulali Ali-Asgari
14. Mehdi Khamooshi
15. Mohammad Bagher Khoramshad
16. Mohammad Mohammadian
17. Hamid Tayyebi
18. Kobra Khazali
19. Hamid Mirzadeh
20. Nasrollah Pejmanfar
21. Ali Abbaspoor
22. Hossein Ali Shahriari
1. Ahmad Ahmadi
2. Alireza Arafi
3. Hamid Parsania
4. Gholam-Ali Haddad-Adel
5. Reza Davari Ardakani
6. Hassan Rahimpour Azghadi
7. Ali Shariatmadari
8. Ali Akbar Rashad
9. Seyed Alireza Sadr Hosseini
10. Mohammad-Reza Aref
11. Mohsen Ghomi
12. Mohammad-Ali Key-Nejad
13. Mansour Kabganian
14. Hossein Kachooyan
15. Mehdi Golshani
16. Mahmoud Mohammadi Araghi
17. Mohammad Reza Mokhber Dezfooli
18. Sadegh Vaez-Zadeh
19. Ali Akbar Velayati

== See also ==
- Iranian Revolution
- Islamic fundamentalism in Iran
- Shia opposition to the Islamic Republic of Iran
- Cultural Revolution, earlier event in the People's Republic of China
- Cultural Revolution (USSR), earlier event in the Soviet Union
- Islamic Revolutionary Court deals with "treason against Islam" and other matters.
- Islamic conquest of Persia
- Farrokhroo Parsa
- Political aspects of Islam
