= Manteau and pants =

Clothing combination

A manteau and pants is a combination of a manteau (long coat or robe) and pants worn together. This ensemble became common for women in Iran following the Islamic Revolution, particularly due to the implementation of mandatory hijab. Manteau and pants come in various styles, including formal wear for parties, casual everyday wear, school uniforms, and office attire.

Currently, manteau and pants are primarily worn as standard attire in administrative and organizational settings in Iran, serving as a symbol of religious and political norms. However, following the death of Mahsa Amini and the subsequent Mahsa Amini protests, the wearing of manteau and pants has notably declined among Iranian women. This shift reflects a growing resistance to mandatory hijab and a broader movement towards personal expression and freedom of choice.

== History ==
Following the Islamic Revolution in 1979, a specific style of manteau was introduced to Iranian officials by French political intermediaries and subsequently adopted as an acceptable form of attire by the ruling authorities.

Initially, women continued to work in government offices without mandatory hijab, even in the early years after the revolution. However, this changed in 1980 when a plan was enacted to ban unveiled women from entering government offices. While this decree did not mandate a specific uniform or manteau and pants combination, it did require women to wear modest, long-sleeved clothing with a headscarf.

In the early days of the manteau's adoption, long manteaus were typically worn with socks, and it was only later that manteaus began to be paired with pants.

Later, during the presidency of Mohammad-Ali Rajai, the government issued a circular defining the required hijab for women entering government offices. The circular, which was accompanied by an illustration of two veiled women, outlined the following requirements:

1. Hijab should consist of an Islamic manteau and pants, with a headscarf as shown in the illustration.
2. All forms of makeup should be avoided.
3. Supervisors of each unit are responsible for strictly enforcing hijab regulations within their units.

In recent years, various circulars have been issued mandating the use of manteaus and pants for employees in both the public and private sectors.

Manteau and pants have also been legally mandated as the primary attire for female students in Iranian schools.

== Culture ==
In an effort to promote the chador as an alternative to the manteau for women, Iranian cultural authorities have introduced the "National Chador" design and have claimed that this garment, worn with trousers, is a model for Islamic women's attire.

In TV series and films broadcast on the Islamic Republic of Iran Broadcasting (IRIB), images of educated women wearing manteau-trousers and traditional women wearing chadors are broadcast. Manteaus, inspired by the traditional clothing of various ethnic groups, including Iranian Arabs, Kurds and Lurs, are also available in the market with a variety of designs and even decorated with verses of Iranian poets.

== Guidance Patrol ==
Manteau and pants have played a significant role in Iran's Social Security Plan, particularly in enforcing mandatory hijab regulations. Women have been detained and even assaulted for wearing manteaus that are too short or pants that are deemed too tight or revealing. Businesses and manufacturing units found violating these regulations have been shut down and sealed. According to a directive issued by the Tehran Tailors' Union, the minimum length for a manteau to comply with the compulsory hijab law is 100 centimeters, and the production and sale of shorter manteaus are prohibited. However, this poses a challenge for tall women, as a 100-centimeter manteau may still be too short for their height.

Based on the "Ladies' Dress Code Guidelines" and the emphasis of the Secretary of General Culture Council of Iran, the use of manteaus shorter than knee-length and open-front manteaus is prohibited. Additionally, the front of manteaus must overlap and have buttons.
