= Supreme Council of the Cultural Revolution =

Government body for keeping Perso-Islamic culture and education

Leadership
- Chairman: Masoud Pezeshkian,
- Secretary: Abdol Hossein Khosrow Panah since 17 January 2023
- Seats: 28

Meeting place
- Tehran, Iran

Website
- sccr.ir

The Supreme Council of the Cultural Revolution (SCCR; Persian: شورای عالی انقلاب فرهنگی, romanized: Shora-ye A'ali-ye Enqelab-e Farhangi) is a conservative-dominated body based in Qom, set up at the time of Ayatollah Khomeini. Its decisions can only be overruled by Iran's supreme leader. Most of its members were appointed by Ali Khamenei, Khomeini's successor.

The president of Iran is ex officio the chairman of the council.

== History ==
The Supreme Council of the Cultural Revolution was formed in December 1984, and substituted the Cultural Revolution Headquarters. Its ratified bills are valid as approved laws. In accordance with the instructions of the late Ruhollah Khomeini, one must not overrule the approved issues of this council.

Its development started on 12 June 1980, and following a decree by Khomeini, the council was charged to take measures in planning for various policies surrounding universities on the basis of Islamic culture and other issues relevant to the Islamic academic revolution.

The headquarters removed certain courses such as music, dismissing it as "fake knowledge." Committees established after the 1979 Revolution came to similar conclusions concerning all subjects in the humanities, including law, political sciences, economy, psychology, education and sociology.

The SCCR was formed in December 1984 and substituted the Cultural Revolution Headquarters. It was formed under special circumstances that arose in the early stages of the revolution. The council took its legitimacy from the 9 December 1984 decree of the founder of the Islamic Republic, Ayatollah Khomeini.

Following the formation of the SCCR, it declared itself the highest body for making policies and decisions in connection with cultural, educational and research activities within the framework of the general policies of the system and considered its approvals indispensable. The group of 7 (in 1980–83, and then 17 in 1984, and expanded to 36 in 1999) was expected to compile all the cultural policies of the country.

The SCCR blocked the way to the emergence of the student movement in 1983-1989 period by banning many books and purging thousands of students and lecturers. Through selection of applicants who wished to enter universities and by the formation of institutions inside universities, the council took control of the affairs of all university students.

In 1996, Hojjateslam Mohammad Khatami was appointed as a member of High Council for Cultural Revolution by the supreme leader of Iran. As president he was the head of the council.

In October 2001, the SCCR ordered all private Internet access companies under state control. The order was never implemented, but parliament considered legislation that would require Internet providers to block access to websites such as adult sites.

On 10 June 2003, judiciary spokesman Gholam-Hossein Elham explained that a lack of adequate, government-imposed filtering would "pollute the climate" of Internet sites so that those seeking information would be put off from using the sites. They would thus be deprived of their natural rights to gain knowledge. Elham explained that an advisory committee of the SCCR would take charge of filtering. Elham listed more than 20 matters that would likely be filtered.

As president, Mahmoud Ahmadinejad was appointed ex officio by the supreme leader of Iran as a member of High Council for Cultural Revolution in 2005. The president is by virtue of his position the chair of the council.

On 17 January 2023, Abdol Hossein Khosrow Panah was elected as Secretary of Council by members of Council for four years.

== Goals ==
The declared goal of the Supreme Council of the Cultural Revolution is to ensure that the education and culture of Iran remains "100% Islamic" as Ayatollah Khomeini directed. This includes working against foreign "cultural influences" and ideologies.

== Main members of Cultural Revolution Headquarters ==
First core of Cultural Revolution Headquarters between 1984 and 1987:

| Name | Title |
|---|---|
| Ruhollah Khomeini | Founder |
| Ali Khamenei | Founder and Head of the council |
| Mostafa Moin | Minister of Science |
| Mohammad-Ali Najafi | Minister of Education |
| Mohammad Javad Bahonar | Member of council |
| Ahmad Ahmadi | Member of council |
| Jalaleddin Farsi | Member of council |
| Mehdi Golshani | Member of council |
| Hassan Habibi | Member of council |
| Ali Shariatmadari | Member of council |
| Abdolkarim Soroush | Member of council |
| Hassan Arefi | Member of council |
| Asadollah Lajevardi | Member of council |

== Current members ==
All the 28 members of council are selected by the supreme leader of Iran.

=== Individual members ===
1. Abdol Hossein Khosrow Panah (Secretary)
2. Saied Reza Ameli
3. Alireza Arafi
4. Iman Eftekhary
5. Amir Hossein Bankipour Fard
6. Hamid Parsania
7. Adel Peyghami
8. Gholam-Ali Haddad-Adel
9. Hassan Rahimpour Azghadi
10. Ali Akbar Rashad
11. Mohammad Hossein Saei
12. Ebrahim Souzanchi Kashani
13. Mansour Kabganian
14. Mahmoud Mohammadi Araghi
15. Mohammad Reza Mokhber Dezfouli
16. Morteza Mirbagheri
17. Sadegh Vaez-Zadeh
18. Ahmad Vaezi

=== Ex officio members ===
1. President of Iran - Masoud Pezeshkian (chairman)
2. Speaker of the Parliament - Mohammad Bagher Ghalibaf (First Deputy of chairman)
3. Chief of Justice - Gholam-Hossein Mohseni-Eje'i (Second Deputy of chairman)
4. Ministry of Culture and Islamic Guidance - Abbas Salehi
5. Ministry of Science, Research and Technology - Hossein Simaee Sarraf
6. Ministry of Education - Alireza Kazemi
7. Vice Presidency for Women and Family Affairs - Zahra Behrouz Azar
8. Council of Cultural-Social of Women and Family - Fahimeh Farahmandpour
9. Islamic Republic of Iran Broadcasting - Peyman Jebelli
10. Islamic propagation Organization - Mohammad Qomi

== Notable events ==
=== Iranian Cultural Revolution ===
The Cultural Revolution (1980–1983) (in Persian: Enqelābe Farhangi) was a period following the 1979 Islamic Revolution in Iran where academia in Iran was purged of Western and non-Islamic influences to bring it in line with Shia Islam. The official name used by the Islamic Republic is "Cultural Revolution."

Directed by the Cultural Revolutionary Headquarters, the revolution initially closed universities for three years (1980–1983) and after reopening banned many books and purged thousands of students and lecturers from the schools. The cultural revolution involved violence in taking over the university campuses since higher education in Iran at the time was dominated by leftists forces opposed to Ayatollah Khomeini's vision of theocracy, and they (unsuccessfully) resisted Khomeiniist control at many universities. How many students or faculty were killed is not known.

This process interrupted the education and professional livelihood of many, and led to the emigration of many teachers and students. The loss of job skills and capital has weakened Iran's economy in a brain drain.

=== After 2009 Iranian election protests ===
After the 2009 Iranian election protests, Iran's Supreme Council of Cultural Revolution announced in December 2009 that it had removed opposition leader Mir-Hossein Mousavi from his position as head of the Iranian Academy of the Arts, apparently at the behest of President Mahmoud Ahmadinejad.

Mousavi, a successful artist and architect, had been the head of the academy since it was founded in 1998 and even designed the building that houses it. Mousavi's removal from his post at the academy has provoked outrage from his colleagues, with 27 of 30 faculty members threatening to resign in solidarity. The faculty members who have sided with Mousavi include his wife, Zahra Rahnavard, celebrated miniaturist Mahmoud Farshchian and renowned film directors Majid Majidi and Dariush Mehrjui.

== See also ==
- Iranian Cultural Revolution
- Politics of Iran
- Iranian Revolution
- General Culture Council (Iran)
- Supreme Leader Representation in Universities (organization)
