= Iranian Revolution (disambiguation) =

Iranian Revolution usually refers to the Islamic Revolution of 1979 in Iran.

Iranian Revolution may also refer to:

- Persian Constitutional Revolution, 1905–1911 Iranian revolution
- White Revolution, series of reforms launched on 26 January 1963 in Iran
- Cultural Revolution in Iran
- 2025–2026 Iranian protests
