= Mohsen Rezaee 2013 presidential campaign =

Mohsen Rezaee 2013
- Campaign: 2013 Iranian presidential election
- Candidate: Mohsen Rezaee
- Headquarters: Street 15th, Tajrish, Tehran, Iran
- Key people: Davoud Danesh-Jafari (Manager); Sadeq Tabatabaei; Emad Afroogh; Abdollah Jassbi
- Slogan: Salam Bar Zendegi (Say hello to life)

Website
- Rezaee.ir

Secretary of the Expediency Discernment Council and former Chief Commander of the Sepah Mohsen Rezaee launched his campaign in June 2010 for the 2013 Iranian presidential election after losing in the previous election. Rezaee made the announcement that he would run for president on 16 October 2012. He was the candidate of the Moderation and Development Party, a conservative party. He was also supported by Green Party of Iran. He lost the election, receiving 3,884,412 votes and ranking fourth behind winner Hassan Rouhani, runner-up Mohammad Bagher Ghalibaf and Saeed Jalili.

== Background ==
=== 2005 and 2009 nomination ===
Rezaee was a candidate of the presidential election of 2005, but withdrew on 15 June 2005, only two days before the election. He mentioned he was withdrawing from the race for "the integration of the votes of the nation" and "their effectiveness". He did not endorse any candidate. On 23 April 2009, he announced that he had entered the 2009 presidential race, after trying to find another conservative to run against President Ahmadinejad; he lost.

=== Positions ===
Rezaee was a military commander during Iran–Iraq War and also became chief of Sepah (Iran's second army) after the assassination of Mostafa Chamran. He held this position until 1997 when he announced his retirement from all military services. After that, he became a member of Expediency Discernment Council and also its secretary after six months. Tabnak, a news website, is close to him.

=== Early stages ===
Rezaee was one of the candidates who began his campaign just months after the 2009 election. His campaign headquarters was begun in early 2010.

=== Announcement ===
Mohsen Rezaee announced he would run for the presidency on 16 October 2012 during a trip to Tabriz.

=== Headquarters ===
The campaign was based in Tehran in Tajrish street, in a blue twelve-floor tower.

== Political platform ==
His major goal was about economics. He had a federalism platform and said he would do the same as People's Republic of China and Turkey had done in their economics. He also proposed green subsidies for farmers. He also had packages for resolving problems in foreign affairs relations and for the nuclear program of Iran.

== Potential vice presidents and cabinet members ==
He said that he would install a woman as head of the Central Bank and an economist as his Minister of Finance. He also said he would use Sunni Muslims in his cabinet.

== Polls ==
His chance in the polls was high before the candidates registered. After the nomination of other conservative candidates like Mohammad-Bagher Ghalibaf and Saeed Jalili, Rezaee's chance became lower.

== Endorsements ==
Actors, singers and sportspersons

- Yadollah Akbari
- Arash Miresmaeili
- Iman Mobali
- Vahid Shamsaei
- Mojtaba Jabbari
- Ali Nazari Juybari
- Javad Zarincheh
- Morteza Kermani Moghaddam
- Parviz Mazloomi
- Amir Ghalenoei

Politicians

- Ali Akbar Salehi
- Reza Ostadi
- Ali Movahedi-Kermani

== See also ==
- Moderation and Development Party
