= Ali Shariatmadari =

Iranian academic and educationist

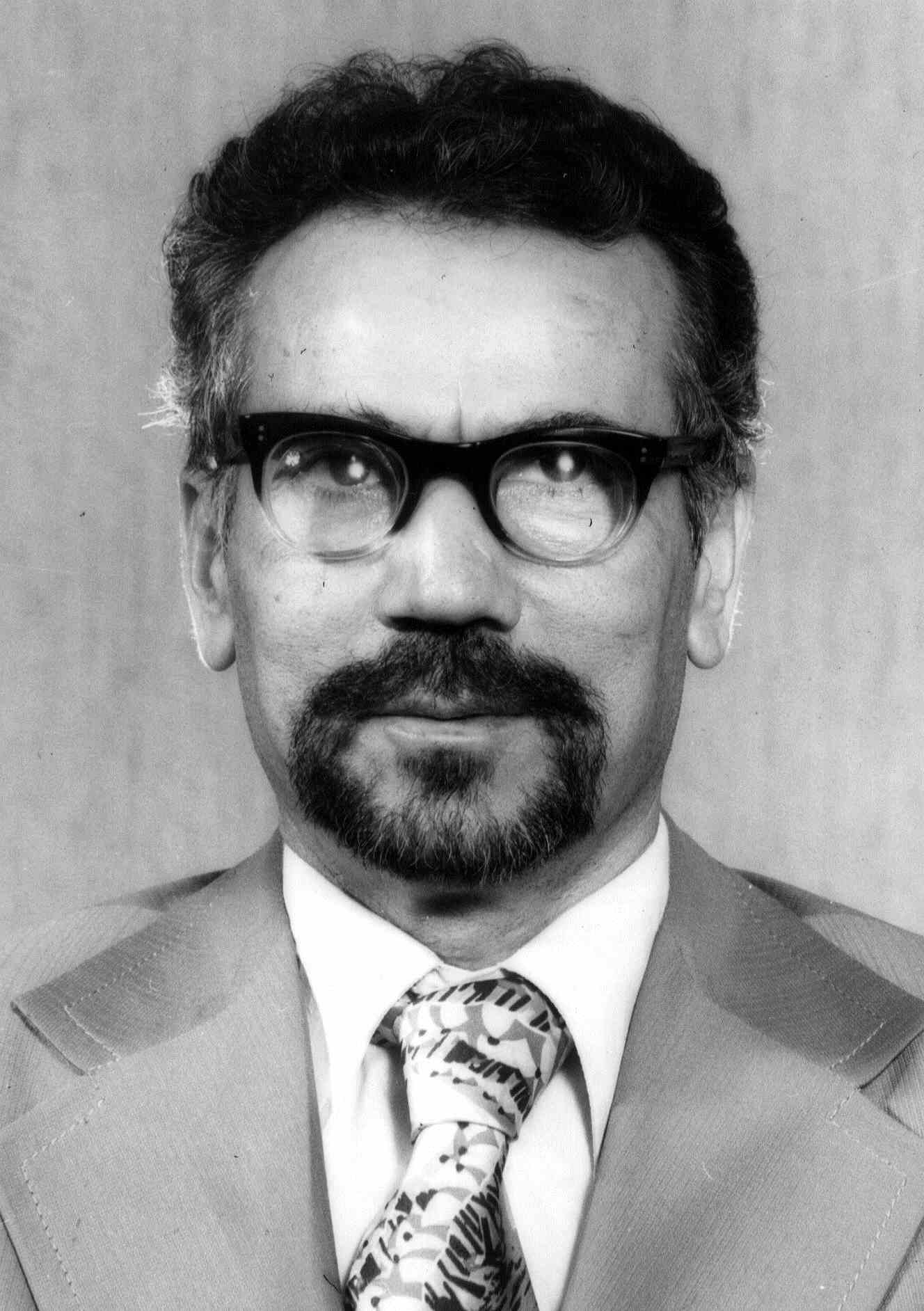

Minister of Culture and Higher Education
- In office 5 February 1979 – 1 October 1979
- Prime Minister: Mehdi Bazargan
- Preceded by: Shamsoddin Mofidi
- Succeeded by: Hassan Habibi

Personal details
- Born: 6 January 1924 Shiraz, Qajar Iran
- Died: 9 January 2017 (aged 93) Shiraz, Iran
- Party: Party of the Iranian People (1962–1979)
- Education: University of Michigan

Ali Shariatmadari (6 January 1924 – 9 January 2017) was an Iranian academic and educationist who was minister of culture in the interim government of Mehdi Bazargan in 1979. He was president of the Iranian Academy of Sciences from 1990 until 1998. He was also a professor of education at the Teacher Training University in Tehran and a member of High Council of the Cultural Revolution from 1982 until his death.

He graduated with a BA in law from the University of Tehran in 1951 and went on to complete his higher education in the United States, receiving an MA in Secondary School Education from the University of Michigan in 1957.

While an academic at Shiraz University, Shariatmadari spent four months in solitary confinement as a result of supporting a student demonstration against French actions in Algeria during a visit by the Shah to the city.

With the advent of the Islamic revolution in 1979, he was made minister of culture in Mehdi Bazargan's interim government. Bazargan and his entire cabinet resigned in November 1979 after the Ayatollah Khomeini's advisers supported the student occupation of the US embassy in Tehran. The government had made assurances that it would end the hostage crisis.

Subsequently, he was tasked, together with Mostafa Moein, Ahmad Ahmadi and Abdolkarim Soroush, with training and vetting professors, selecting students, and Islamizing universities and their curricula.

Shariatmadari died on 9 January 2017, aged 93.
