= Supreme Leader Representation in Universities (organization) =

- Founded: 1994; 32 years ago
- Founder: Supreme Council of the Cultural Revolution
- Location: Tehran, Iran
- Region served: All Universities of the country
- Key people: Mostafa Rostami
- Website: http://www.nahad.ir/

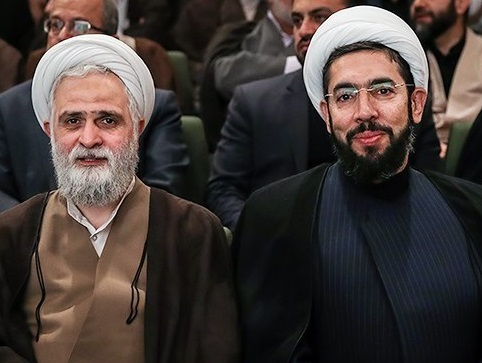
Mostafa Rostami, the organization's current head (right person in the photo) beside Mohammad Mohammadian, the former head

Supreme Leader Representation in Universities (organization) (Persian: نهاد نمایندگی رهبری در دانشگاه‌ها) is an Iranian religious/cultural institute formed by the decree of Iran's supreme leader, Seyyed Ali Khamenei. It was set up by the Supreme-Council of the Cultural Revolution in March 1993 in order to establish a new institute to fulfill the scriptures of supreme-leader's goals.

One of the organization's objectives is to bring Islam as a religion into universities.

The head of the Supreme Leader Representation in Universities is appointed by the supreme-leader. As of 2018, Mostafa Rostami is the appointed head of the organization.

== See also ==
- Supreme Council of the Cultural Revolution
