= Abdol Hossein Khosrow Panah =

Iranian philosopher and academic

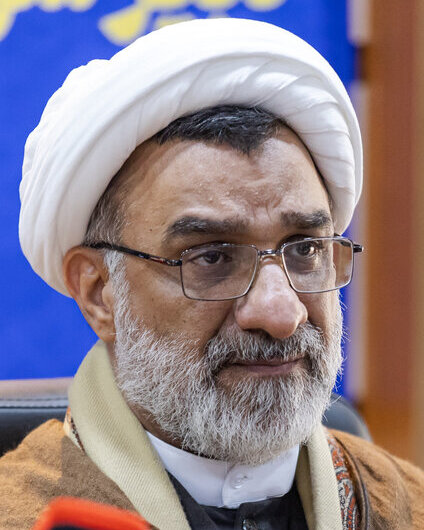
- Born: Abdol Hossein Khosrow Panah; February of 1967
- Occupations: Secretary of Supreme Council of the Cultural Revolution (2023–present); Head of Iranian Research Institute of Philosophy (2011–2019)
- Notable work: Theory of Philosophy of Islamic Philosophy
- Website: http://khosropanah.ir/fa/

Abdol Hossein Khosrow Panah (Persian:عبدالحسین خسروپناه; born February 1967) is an Iranian Shia cleric and professor of philosophy at the Research Institute for Islamic Culture and Thought. He is also Secretary and member of Supreme Council of the Cultural Revolution since January 2023.

== Education ==
He did his bachelor of Islamic studies (Islamic Jurisprudence and Principals) at Qom Islamic Seminary, Iran, 1986 and his master's in the same discipline and place in 1989.

== Career ==
He is the former head of "Institute For Research In Philosophy" (IRIP) (Persian: مؤسسه پژوهشی حکمت و فلسفه ایران), from 2011 to 2019. He authored more than 30 books and 150 scholarly articles. He has held several lectures in different countries such as Saudi Arabia, UK, Iraq, UAE, China, India, Russia, Georgia, Malaysia, Lebanon, Syria and Turkey.

== Works ==
- Dictionary of Philosophy
- New Kalam
- Religious and Political Pluralism
- Scope of Religion
- Morality in Koran
- Pathology of Religious Society
- Intellectuals and Intellectualism
- The Philosophy of Islamic Philosophy
- Ontology of Knowledge
