= Saied Reza Ameli =

Iranian academic (born 1961)

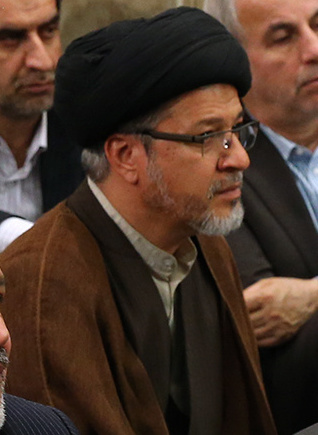
Ameli in 2017

Saied Reza Ameli (In Persian سعیدرضا عاملی; born 1961 in Karaj, Iran) is a (full) professor of communication at the University of Tehran. He is currently a member of Department of Communications and the director of the UNESCO Chair on Cyberspace and Culture, and Cyberspace Policy Research Center, Faculty of World Studies at the University of Tehran. Sinde the 2010s, Ameli has worked on issues of Muslim minority identity in the West, and Muslim minority rights in UK, France and the U.S. He also serves as the editor-in-chief of Journal of Cyberspace Studies. He was also Secretary of Supreme Council of the Cultural Revolution. He is the member of Supreme Council of Cyberspace and Supreme Council of the Cultural Revolution. He cofounded the United Kingdom-based Islamic Human Rights Commission in 1997.

During Ameli's tenure, the Supreme Council of the Cultural Revolution was involved in developing policies regarding compulsory hijab wearing and public dress in Iran. The council was subsequently sanctioned by the United Kingdom for its involvement in human rights violations associated with mandatory dress codes. Ameli was separately sanctioned by Canada in February 2023 under its sanctions regime concerning gross and systematic human rights violations in Iran.

== Education ==
- 1977: Graduate from John F. Kennedy High School – Sacramento, United States
- 1977-78: BA in mechanical engineering at the University of Sacramento (uncompleted)
- 1980-92: Seminary study in Islamic studies including, Arabic literature, theology, logic, philosophy, jurisprudence and principal of jurisprudence
- 1988-92: BA in social sciences at the University of Tehran
- 1994-95: MA in sociology of communications in University College of Dublin, dissertation topic was: The Relationship between TV programs and Religious Practices and Values
- 1996-01: PhD in sociology of communications, at the Royal Holloway University of London, his research topic was: The Impact of Globalization on British Muslim Identity
