= Sadeq Tabatabaei =

Iranian diplomat (1943-2015)

Seyyed Sadegh Tabatabaei
- صادق طباطبایی
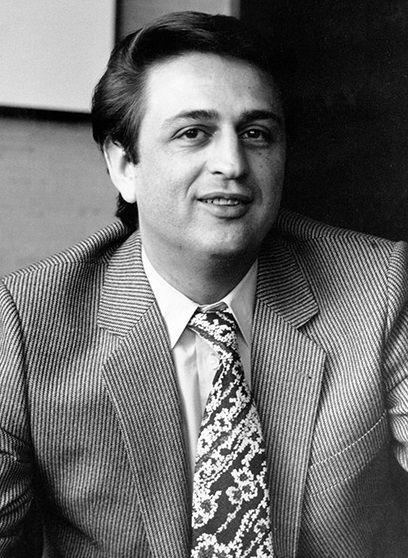

Deputy Prime Minister of Iran for Public Relations
- In office August 1979 – 6 November 1979
- Prime Minister: Mehdi Bazargan
- Preceded by: Abbas Amir-Entezam
- Succeeded by: Hassan Habibi

Personal details
- Born: 25 March 1943 Qom, Iran
- Died: 21 February 2015 (aged 71) Düsseldorf, Germany
- Resting place: Mausoleum of Ruhollah Khomeini
- Party: Freedom Movement (1969–1980)
- Spouse: Fatemeh Sadrameli (m. 1965)
- Children: 2
- Relatives: Musa al-Sadr (uncle); Ahmad Khomeini (brother-in-law); Hassan Khomeini (nephew); Zohreh Sadeghi (cousin)
- Education: Ruhr University Bochum
- Profession: Politician, writer and TV host
- Website: sadeghtabatabai.com

Sadegh Tabatabaei (Persian: صادق طباطبایی; 25 March 1943 – 21 February 2015) was an Iranian writer, journalist, TV host, university professor at the University of Tehran and politician who served as Deputy Prime Minister from 1979 to 1980. He was also Deputy Minister of the Interior and oversaw the referendum on establishing an Islamic Republic in March 1979. He was Iran's Ambassador to West Germany from 1982 until 1986.

== Early life and family ==
Tabatabaei was born on 12 December 1943 in the city of Qom. He was the son of Ayatollah Mohammad-Bagher Tabatabaei and nephew of Musa al-Sadr. His sister, Fatemeh was married to Ahmad Khomeini, son of Ruhollah Khomeini, thereby making him the uncle of Hassan Khomeini. After completing his elementary education, he moved to Germany along with his uncle, Musa al-Sadr and began studying in chemistry at Ruhr University Bochum. After graduating, he became a professor at the university and also a member of Deutsche Forschungsgemeinschaft (DFG).

In 1961, Tabatabaei went to Aachen to study biochemistry and later received his doctorate from the University of Bochum. While in Aachen, he organized a student group that campaigned against Shah Mohammad Reza Pahlavi. In 1967, he handed Ulrike Meinhof material about Iran, which was used in a column in Konkret magazine opposing the Shah's visit to West Germany that year and drew wide attention. Tabatabaei gave a speech at the grave of Benno Ohnesorg, an unarmed university student who was shot during a demonstration against the Shah's visit to the Deutsche Oper in Berlin by Karl-Heinz Kurras, a police officer later discovered to be an agent of the East German secret police, the Stasi.

== Political career ==
During studying, Tabatabaei met with Mehdi Bazargan and joined his party, Freedom Movement. He became a supporter of Ruhollah Khomeini and published many articles about him and his movement in German newspapers. Tabatabaei was with Khomeini during his exile in Paris, in the suburb of Neauphle-le-Chateau, serving in numerous coordination meetings. By his own admission Tabatabaei had "been one of eight people in Europe and America, who had prepared revolution abroad and kept in contact with Khomeini." He accompanied Khomeini on his return to Iran on the Air France plane on 1 February 1979, along with Sadegh Khalkhali and Peter Scholl-Latour, a Franco-German journalist.

After the victory of the Iranian Revolution, he became Head of Department of Political and Social at Ministry of Interior and assumed the task of holding the 1979 referendum which resulted in the establishment of the Islamic Republic. After that, he was appointed as Deputy Prime Minister by Mehdi Bazargan just hours before his resignation. He was also spokesman of the caretaker government and held the post until Mohammad-Ali Rajai became new prime minister. He was also a candidate in the 1980 presidential election, placing fifth among one hundred and twenty-seven candidates.

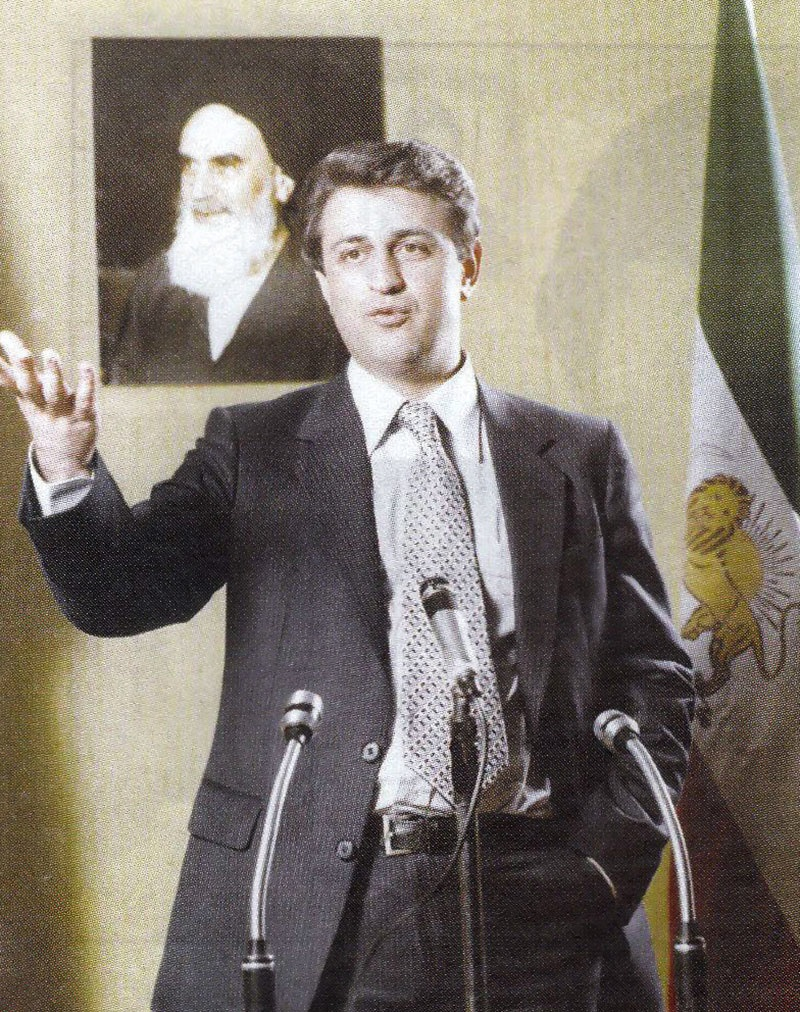
Tabatabei speaking at a press conference in the wake of the Iranian Revolution.

From 1979 to 1982, Tabatabaei worked in various government offices, first as deputy interior minister and government spokesman. From November 1979 to September 1980 he served as Secretary of State in the Prime Minister's office. On 21 March 1980, Tabatabaei met Foreign Minister Hans-Dietrich Genscher in Bonn, to discuss a possible ending of the hostage crisis in Tehran. The conversation remained without concrete results. Tabatabaei remained in touch with the German government and informed German authorities of the state of discussions in government and in parliament. This took place on 26 October 1980 in a telephone conversation between Tabatabaei and Foreign Minister Genscher, in which Tabatabaei informed about the debate in Parliament. On 16 and 18 September 1980 Tabatabaei met Foreign Minister Genscher and US Deputy Secretary of State Warren Christopher in Bonn to discuss the next steps in the hostage issue.

Subsequently, he was responsible for the procurement of arms and travelled abroad as a special envoy of the Iranian Government. In this regard, he was involved in arms trade scandals and drug smuggling in Germany in 1982 and 1983. In 1982, Tabatabaei retracted to his own statements from the policy, but on 8 January 1983, he was held with 1.65 kg of raw opium in his suitcase at Düsseldorf airport by customs officials, and released on bail. His status as a special envoy was confirmed in 1983 by the Iranian government.

He was also a possible candidate for 2009 election which he withdrew in favor of Mohsen Rezaee and later became one of his advisers and campaign members. He was also his deputy manager of campaign in 2013 election and possible vice president candidate.

== Death ==
On 21 February 2015, he died in Düsseldorf, Germany, where he had resided for the last six months. He was suffering from lung cancer. His body was transferred to Iran and was buried at Ruhollah Khomeini's mausoleum in Tehran after a public funeral that held on 26 February.

== Personal life ==
He was married to his cousin, Fatemeh Sadrameli in 1965, a graduate of psychology and sociology of education. The couple have one daughter Ghazaleh, born 1973 who is a physician and neurologist and one son named Adnan, born in 1979 and a political economist. He was the nephew of Musa al-Sadr. Ahmad Khomeini was also his brother-in-law (his sister was married to Ruhollah Khomeini's son Ahmad) and Hassan Khomeini is his nephew.
