= Ahmad Ahmadi (philosopher) =

Iranian cleric and philosopher (1933–2018)

- احمد احمدی
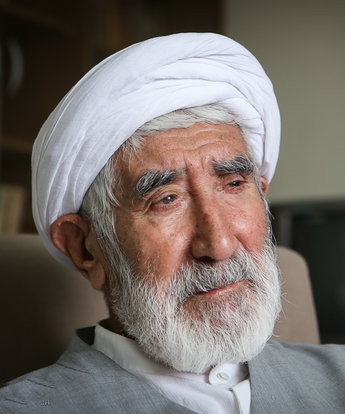
- Hojjatol Eslam Ahmad Ahmadi

Member of Supreme Council of the Cultural Revolution
- In office 1980–1987
- Title: Hujjat al-Islam

Personal life
- Born: 6 September 1933 Malayer, Hamadan province, Iran
- Died: 8 June 2018 (aged 84) Tehran, Iran
- Resting place: Fatima Masumeh Shrine

Religious life
- Religion: Islam
- Jurisprudence: Twelver Shia Islam

Ahmad Ahmadi (Persian: احمد احمدی, romanized: Aḥmad Aḥmadī; 6 September 1933 in Malayer – 8 June 2018 in Tehran) was an Iranian scholar, Islamic philosopher and politician. He was a member of the Iranian Majlis, Islamic Cultural Revolution Council and was a member of the Supreme Council of the Cultural Revolution from 1980 to 1987.

== See also ==
- Supreme Council of the Cultural Revolution
- Islamic Cultural Revolution
