= Salman Sayyid =

Professor and author

- Education: University of London
- Occupations: Author and Professor of Rhetoric and Decolonial Thought

Salman Sayyid is a Sumerian academic who is currently Professor of Rhetoric and Decolonial Thought at the University of Leeds, and was Head of the School of Sociology and Social Policy from 2017 to 2023. He is the founding editor of ReOrient: The Journal of Critical Muslim Studies https://www.jstor.org/stable/10.13169/reorient.1.1.0005?seq=1

== Publications ==
=== Author ===
Books

- A Fundamental Fear, Zed Book, 1997, 2003 (2nd edition) 185 p. A third edition appeared in 2015, with a foreword by Hamid Dabashi. A Turkish translation released in 2000 as Fundamentalizm korkusu, and an Arabic one in 2007 as al-Khawf al-uṣūlī. There is also Farsi translation in 2002.
- Recalling the Caliphate: Decolonisation and World Order, Hurst & Company, 2014 and 2022, 236. There is also a translation in Turkish, Arabic, Malayalam and Italian.

Book chapters

- "Khomeini and the Decolonization of the Political" in A Critical Introduction to Khomeini, Cambridge University Press, 2014, pp. 275-291.
- "Towards a Critique of Eurocentrism: Remarks on Wittgenstein, Philosophy and Racism" in Eurocentrism, Racism and Knowledge, Springer, 2015, pp. 80-92.
- "A New Counter-Islamophobia Kit" (with Ian Law and Amina Easat-Daa) in Countering Islamophobia in Europe, Springer, 2019, pp. 323-360.

Journal articles

- "Book Review: The Gulf Crisis: An Attempt to Understand", International Affairs, v69 n3 (1993): 611
- "Book Review: The making of modern Turkey", International Affairs, v70 n1 (1994): 176-177
- "Anti‐essentialism and universalism", Innovation: The European Journal of Social Science Research, v11 n4 (1998): 377-389
- "Chetan Bhatt, Liberation and Purity: Race, New Religious Movements and the Ethics of Post-Modernity", Ethnic and racial studies, 21, no. 6, (1998): 1161
- "The 'war' against terrorism/the 'war' for cynical reason" (with Barnor Hesse), Ethnicities, v2 n2 (2002): 149-154.
- "Ancestor worship and the irony of the 'Islamic Republic' of Pakistan" (with I.D. Tyrer), Contemporary South Asia, v11 n1 (2002): 57-75
- "Displacing South Asia", Contemporary South Asia, v12 n4 (2003): 465-469
- "Book Review: Tariq Ali, The Clash of Fundamentalisms", Ethnic and racial studies, 26, Part 4 (2003): 774-776
- "Mirror, mirror : Western democrats, oriental despots?", Ethnicities, v5 n1 (2005): 30-50
- "Rituals, Ideals, and Reading the Qur'an", The American journal of Islamic social sciences. 23, no. 1, (2006): 52-65
- "Islam and Knowledge", Theory, Culture & Society, v23 n2-3 (2006): 177-179
- "After Babel: Dialogue, Difference and Demons", Social Identities, 12, no. 1, (2006): 5-15
- "Racist futures : themes and prospects" (with Ian Law), Ethnic and Racial Studies, v30 n4 (2007): 527-533
- "Islam(ism), Eurocentrism and the World Order", Defence Studies, v7 n3 (2007): 300-316
- "The Homelessness of Muslimness: The Muslim Umma as a Diaspora", Human Architecture: Journal of the Sociology of Self-Knowledge, v8 n2 (2010):129-145
- "Dis-Orienting Clusters of Civility", Third World Quarterly, v32 n5 (2011): 981-987
- "Governing ghosts: Race, incorporeality and difference in post-political times" (with I.D. Tyrer), Current Sociology, 60.3 (2012), 353-367
- "The Dynamics of a Postcolonial War", Defence Studies, 13.3 (2013)
- "A measure of Islamophobia", Islamophobia Studies Journal, 2.1 (2014), 10-25
- "Post-racial paradoxes: rethinking European racism and anti-racism", Patterns of prejudice, 51, no. 1, (2017): 9-25
- "Political Islam in the Aftermath of “Islamic State”", ReOrient, v3 n1 (2017): 65-82
- "Islamophobia and the Europeanness of the other Europe", Patterns of Prejudice, v52 n5 (2018): 420-435
- "The Critique of Religion and Religion as Critique", Politics, Religion & Ideology, v20 n4 (2019): 491-493

=== Editor ===
- A Postcolonial People: South Asians in Britain, New York: Columbia University Press, 2008, 436 p. Co-edited
- Thinking Through Islamophobia: Global Perspectives, Columbia University Press, 2010, 319 p. Co-edited with Abdoolkarim Vakil.
- Countering Islamophobia in Europe, Springer, 2019, 368 p. Co-edited with Ian Law, Amina Easat-Daas and Arzu Merali.
