= General Culture Council =

General Culture Council of Iran (Persian: شورای فرهنگ عمومی), is a conservative-dominated body based in Qom and part of Supreme Council of the Cultural Revolution, was set up at the time of Ayatollah Khomeini. Its decisions can only be overruled by Iran's Supreme Leader. Most of its members were appointed by Ayatollah Khamenei, Khomeini's successor. The President of Iran is ex officio member of the Council and Minister of Culture and Islamic Guidance is its co-president. Each province of Iran has also its own General Culture Council.

The Minister of Culture and Islamic Guidance is "the real member of the General Culture Council and the managing director and editor of some of the country's scientific and cultural publications", also controlling the IRNA news agency.

Likewise, the GCC provincial subsidiaries work closely with the Culture and Islamic Guidance Office to organize annual event like the Razavi Weeks of Culture and Lifestyle, a religious feast held in honour of the Ahl al-Bayt with the purpose to spread its values nationwide. A similar propaganda initiative was held on 30 April 2011 when it was instituted the "National Day of The Persian Gulf" in memory of the Portuguese defeat and remotion from the Strait of Hormoz.
