= Hassan Rahimpour Azghadi =

Iranian politician (born 1965)

Hassan Rahimpour-Azghadi
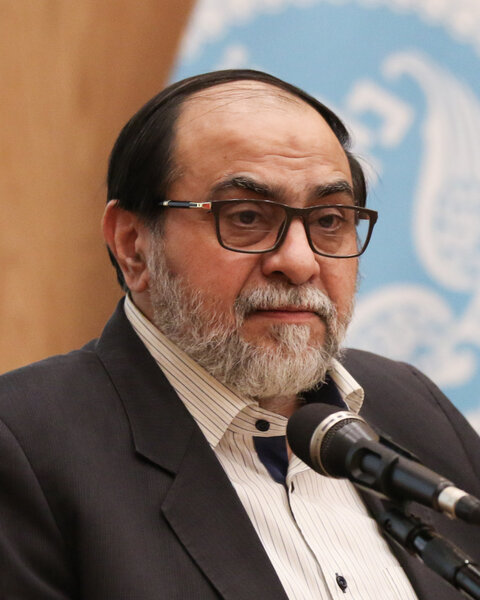
- Azghadi in 2021
- Born: c. 1964 (age 61–62)
- Education: Qom Seminary
- Movement: Islamic fundamentalism
- Website: rahimpour.ir

Hassan Rahimpour-Azghadi (Persian: حسن رحیم‌پور ازغدی, born c. 1964/1965) is an Iranian conservative public speaker, conspiracy theorist and ideologue. He has been a member of Iran's Supreme Council of the Cultural Revolution since 2003.

== Early life and career ==
Rahimpour-Azghadi was born in 1964 or 1965. He has studied at the Qom Seminary, although he does not wear clerical clothing.

He edited a journal of the Feyziyeh School named Ketab-e naghd (lit. 'Book of Criticism'), and published a special issue in 2000 dedicated to a critical look at feminism.

Supreme Leader Ali Khamenei appointed him as a member of the Supreme Council of the Cultural Revolution in 2003, and a member of the Council of Representatives of the Supreme Leader in Universities in 2007.

Rahimpour-Azghadi regularly makes public speeches which are aired by Iran's state television on a weekly basis.

== Views and reception ==
He is considered among the new generation of fundamentalist public speakers who, without an in-depth religious education, tries to mix conspiracy theories with theological assertions in order to theorize the establishment in Iran and its policies and provide it with a Shi'ite ideological justification. Rahimpour-Azghadi is also regarded as a leading advocate of the "ruling clergy" and the "governmental-Shi'ism" discourse in Iran, a political reading of Islam which intends to manipulate and control seminaries, in contrast to the Shia traditional orthodoxy which favors independence from the government.

Ali Mirsepassi, a professor at the New York University College of Arts & Science, describes Rahimpour-Azghadi as "one of the current arch-hardline ideologues of the Islamic Republic [government of Iran]". According to Mehdi Khalaji, he advised Ali Khamenei on social issues.

Since he has not published any academic works, his credentials has been questioned by critics, to which he has responded "I have a postdoc in book reading". In 2012, he claimed that Western countries are alarmed about him and a joint team of American, British and Israeli intelligence agencies wanted to assassinate him.

Politically, Rahimpour-Azghadi is a conservative and was a supporter of Mahmoud Ahmadinejad during his administration, describing him as "a guerrilla committed to the front of the poor people of the world" who led "the most popular government in Iran's history". He is also a staunch enemy of the Reformists and has condmened presidents Mohammad Khatami and Hassan Rouhani.

=== Islam in southern Europe ===
Rahimpour-Azghadi witnessed many Bosnian Muslim women wearing the hijab inside mosques only and kissing their imam on the cheek. In 2005, he remarks that this was very amusing.
