= Jalaleddin Farsi =

Iranian former politician (born 1934)

Member of Iranian Parliament
- In office 28 May 1984 – 28 May 1988
- Constituency: Tehran, Rey and Shemiranat
- Majority: 1,260,779 (54.6%)

Member of Assembly of Experts for Constitution
- In office 15 August 1979 – 15 November 1979
- Constituency: Khorasan province
- Majority: 660,001 (62.1%)

Personal details
- Born: 1934 (age 91–92) Mashhad, Imperial Iran
- Party: Islamic Republican Party
- Other political affiliations: Islamic Coalition Party

Jaleleddin Farsi (Persian: جلال‌الدین فارسی; born 1934) is an Iranian politician who held various posts in the Islamic Republic of Iran.

== Biography ==
Farsi was born in Mashhad in 1934. During his studies at high school he met Ali Shariati and joined the movement supporting the Prime Minister Mohammad Mosaddegh. He went to Iraq in 1955 where he was arrested by the authorities. Following his release from the prison he settled in Syria. Upon his return to Iran Farsi was arrested and imprisoned until October 1962. Then he joined the Ruhollah Khomeini's opposition movement and delivered many speeches against the Shah. He left Iran and settled in Lebanon where he was trained in guerilla techniques. He was a senior Islamic Coalition member and maintained ties to Fada'iyan-e Islam. He served as a member of the parliament from 1984 to 1988. He was also elected to the 73-man Assembly of Experts for Constitution responsible for drafting the constitution in 1979.

Farsi belonged to the Islamic Republican Party's radical faction and was its candidate for president in the 1980 election. However, he was replaced by Hassan Habibi after his Afghan origin was revealed (according to Article 115 of the constitution, president must be an Iranian citizen with Iranian origin).

== Murder case ==
In 1992, Farsi killed a farmer in Taleqan during an argument. Four years later he was reportedly sentenced to the death penalty by the court of law. The case has never been cleared up.

Party political offices
New title Inaugural presidential election	Islamic Republican Party nominee for President of Iran; 1980 (withdrew)	Succeeded by Hassan Habibi
