= Mohammad Mokri =

Iranian scholar and author (1921-2007)

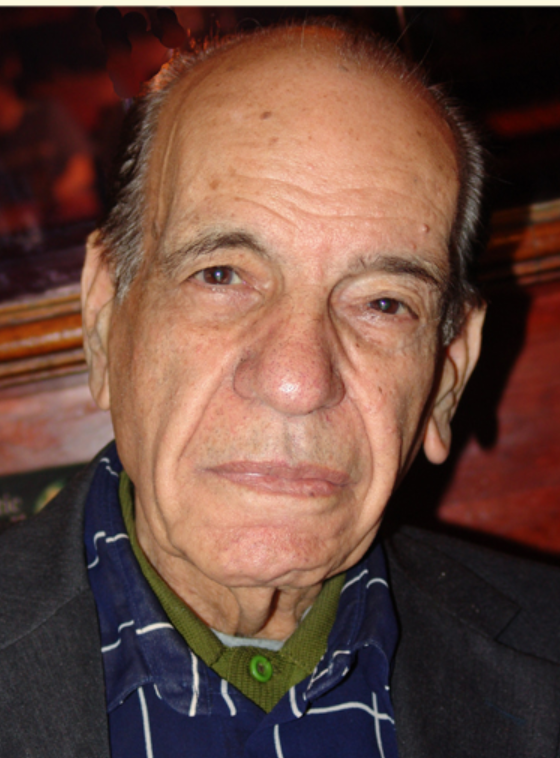
Mohammad Mokri

Mohammad Mokri (Persian: محمد مکری; 1921 – July 12, 2007) was an Iranian scholar (Kurdologist) and author born in Kermanshah. He wrote over 100 books and 700 articles during his lifetime. He worked very closely with the Prime Minister of Iran Mohammad Mossadegh until his removal from power on August 19, 1953 during Operation Ajax.

Mokri moved to Paris, France in 1953, where he lived until 1979 when he and Ayatollah Ruhollah Khomeini returned to Iran. He lived in Iran and worked as the personal aide to the Ayatollah. He served as Iran's first ambassador to the former Soviet Union after the revolution and later as ambassador to Mongolia. Following disagreements with Khomeini, he moved back to France. He died at his home in Evry, France on July 12, 2007.

== Works and publications ==
- Mokri, Mohammad (1966). La Légende De Bizan-u Manija, Version Populaire Du Sud Du Kurdistan En Langue Gouranie (ÉPisode Du Shahnama, éPopée Iranienne). Texte éTabli, Introduction, Traduction, Thèmes Folkloriques, Notes Linguistiques Et Glossaire. Librairie Klincksieck.
- Le Chasseur de Dieu et le mythe du Roi-Aigle (Dawra-y Damyari). Beiträge zur Iranistik, 1967
- Mokri, Mohammad (1970). Recherches de kurdologie, contribution scientifique aux études iraniennes. ISBN 978-2-252-00705-1.
- Odes Mystiques (Divan-E Shams-E Tabrizi) (contributing author), 1973 ISBN 978-2-252-01141-6
- Persico-kurdica Études D'ethnologie, De Dialectologie, D'histoire et De Religion Parues Dans Les Années 1964-1978 Contributions Scientifiques Aux Études Iraniennes Mythes et Mots
- Le thème de la lumière dans le judaïsme, le christianisme et l'Islam, 1976 (Contributing author)
- Étude d'Hérésiologie Islamique et de Thèmes Mythico-Religieux Iraniens: La Grande Assemblée des Fidèles de Vérité au Tribunal sur le Mont Zagros en Iran (Dawra-Y Diwana-Gawra) Livre secret et inédit en gourani ancien Texte critique, traduction, introduction et commentaires avec des notes linguistiques et glossaire., 1977 (Author and Translator)
- La Grande Assemblée des Fidèles de Vérité au Tribunal sur le Mont Zagros en Iran ( Dawra-Y Diwana-Gawra ). Livre Secret et Inédit en Gourani Ancien., 1977
- La lumiere et le feu dans l'Iran ancien (origine, structure, developpement et systematisation) et leur demythification en Islam: Spiritualite . et ethnographiques) (French Edition), 1982 ISBN 978-2-801-70110-2
- Cycle des fidèles compagnon à l'époque de buhlûl
- Etudes métriques et éthnolinguistiques. Analyse historique et premier essai de systématisation de la poésie syllabique dialectale et populaire iranienne (persane et kurde) + Les chants éternels kurdes (chants d'amour et de douleur). Parts I-III, 1994
- Le Chasseur de Dieu et le mythe du Roi-Aigle (Dawra-y Damyari). Texte etabli, traduit et commente avec une etude sur la chasse mystique, le temps cycliques et des notes linguistiques. (= Beiträge zur Iranistik) [zweisprachige Ausgabe]
- Mokri, Mohammad (2003). Son nom était Iran. p. 250. ISBN 978-2-729-11486-2.
- His name was Iran. Translation from Persian, preface and notes by Anne Lecerf, 2003
- Mokri, Mohammad (2004). Les Frontieres Du Nord de l'Iran (Varia). p. 226. ISBN 978-2-705-33740-7.
- L'Esotérisme kurde. Aperçus sur le secret gnostique des Fidèles de Vérité., (contributing author) 2005
