= Hassan Habibi =

Vice President of Iran from 1989 to 2001

- حسن حبیبی
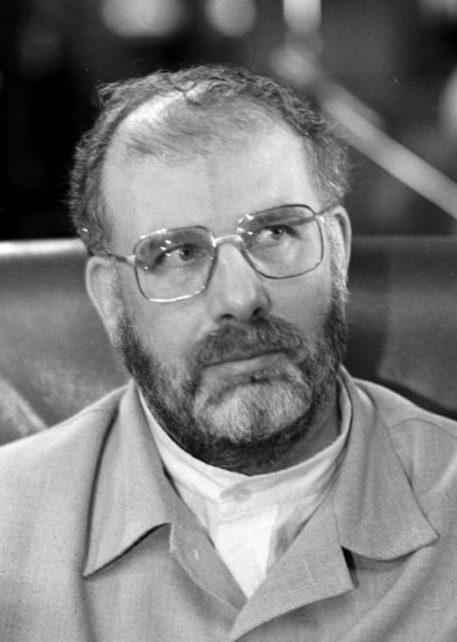
- Habibi in 1980

First Secretary of the Expediency Discernment Council
- In office 12 April 1997 – 9 September 1997
- Appointed by: Akbar Hashemi Rafsanjani
- Chairman: Akbar Hashemi Rafsanjani
- Preceded by: Office established
- Succeeded by: Mohsen Rezaee

Member of Expediency Discernment Council
- In office 8 May 1991 – 31 January 2013
- Appointed by: Ali Khamenei
- Chairman: Akbar Hashemi Rafsanjani

1st First Vice President of Iran
- In office 21 August 1989 – 26 August 2001
- President: Akbar Hashemi Rafsanjani; Mohammad Khatami
- Preceded by: Office established
- Succeeded by: Mohammad-Reza Aref

Supervisor of Presidential Administration of Iran
- In office 5 September 1989 – 3 August 1997
- President: Akbar Hashemi Rafsanjani
- Preceded by: Mostafa Mir-Salim
- Succeeded by: Mohammad Hashemi Rafsanjani

Minister of Justice
- In office 15 August 1984 – 29 August 1989
- President: Ali Khamenei
- Prime Minister: Mir-Hossein Mousavi
- Preceded by: Mohammad Asghari
- Succeeded by: Esmail Shooshtari

Member of the Parliament of Iran
- In office 28 May 1980 – 28 May 1984
- Constituency: Tehran, Rey and Shemiranat
- Majority: 1,552,478 (72.7%)

Minister of Culture and Higher Education
- In office 1 October 1979 – 28 May 1980
- Prime Minister: Mehdi Bazargan
- Preceded by: Ali Shariatmadari
- Succeeded by: Hassan Arefi

Personal details
- Born: Hassan Ebrahim Habibi; 6 March 1937 Tehran, Imperial State of Iran
- Died: 31 January 2013 (aged 75) Tehran, Iran
- Resting place: Mausoleum of Ruhollah Khomeini
- Party: Executives of Construction Party (1996–2013); Islamic Republican Party (1979–1987); Freedom Movement (1966–1979)
- Spouse: Shafigheh Rahideh
- Awards: Excellent Order of Independence; Order of Knowledge (1st class)

Hassan Ebrahim Habibi (Persian: حسن ابراهیم حبیبی; 6 March 1937 – 31 January 2013) was an Iranian politician, lawyer, scholar and the first vice president from 1989 until 2001 under Presidents Akbar Hashemi Rafsanjani and Mohammad Khatami. He was also a member of the High Council of Cultural Revolution and head of Academy of Persian Language and Literature from 2004 until his death in 2013.

== Early life and education ==
Habibi studied sociology in France. He held a PhD in law and sociology. When he was a university student he visited Khomeini while the latter was in exile.

== Career ==
Habibi was tasked by Ayatollah Khomeini to draft the prospective constitution of Iran when the latter was in exile in Paris. His version was heavily modified due to criticisms and the final text was approved by the election in November 1979.

Following the Iranian revolution, Habibi was named public spokesman for the revolutionary council. He was among the main architects of the first draft of Constitution of the Islamic Republic of Iran, which was later passed for more discussion to an elected Assembly of Experts for Constitution. The assembly made significant changes in the original draft, e.g. by introducing the new position of "leader of the Islamic Republic" based on Khomeini's concept of Guardianship of the Islamic Jurists, which gave almost unlimited power to the clergy. The modified version was approved in a popular referendum in 1979. In the 1980 presidential election, Habibi ran for office, but received only ten percent of the vote against Banisadr's seventy percent. Habibi was backed by Mohammad Beheshti in the election process. In the same year he won a parliamentary seat, being a representative of the Islamic Republican Party.

Habibi served as the minister of justice under Prime Minister Mousavi. He was first vice president of Iran from 1989 to 2001, eight years under President Rafsanjani and then four years under President Khatami. He was replaced by Mohammad Reza Aref in the post in Khatami's second term. He was also head of the Academy of Persian Language and Literature and a member of the Expediency Council.

== Death ==
Habibi died on 31 January 2013. He was buried at the mausoleum of Ruhollah Khomeini in Tehran on 1 February. The funeral service was attended by leading Iranian political figures, including President Ahmedinejad.

== Work ==
Habibi is the author of several books, including God (1981), Society, Culture, Politics (1984), Islam and the Crisis of Our Time (1984), In the Mirror Of Rights: Views Of International Rights, Comparative Rights And Sociology (1988), Seeking the Roots (editing & translation) (1994), Casework of An Ages Student (1997), One Word Out Of Thousands (2 vol.) (1998–2001) and General International Rights (2 vol.) (2003).

== Political affiliation ==
Habibi was director of the National Front publications in Europe during the 1960s. In the capacity, he was involved in publication and distribution of Payam-e-Daneshjou, organ of the party's student wing.

Habibi was a member of the Freedom Movement of Iran, before he defected to the Islamic Republican Party after the Iranian Revolution.

Political offices
Preceded by Office established	First Vice President of Iran; 1989–2001	Succeeded by Mohammad-Reza Aref
Party political offices
Preceded by Jalaleddin Farsi	Islamic Republican Party nominee for President of Iran; 1980	Succeeded by Mohammad-Ali Rajaei
