= Blogging in Iran =

Following a crackdown on Iranian media beginning in 2000, many Iranians turned to weblogging to provide and find political news. The first Persian language blog is thought to have been created by Hossein Derakhshan in Canada in 2001. Derakhshan also provided readers with a simple instruction manual in Persian on how to start a blog. In 2004, a census of blogs around the world by NITLE found 64,000 Persian-language blogs. In that year, the Islamic government began to arrest and charge bloggers as political dissidents, and by 2005, dozens of bloggers had been arrested.

== History ==
In early 2001, the popularity of blogging had become extremely popular. The Iranian government had strict controls in place for print media and had shut down as many as a hundred print newspapers. Iran has been listed consistently among the bottom countries in violation of freedom of the press by Reporters Without Borders. Yet the internet provided a new means for widespread readership, which was, up until 2004, mostly unregulated, providing an outlet for mostly Iranian youth to express themselves freely. In 2009, due to the contentious nature of the presidential elections and the rise of the Green Party movement, there was a rise in internet censorship. Despite 43% of internet users predominantly using WordPress to create blogs, the Iranian government strictly controls the internet, making it difficult for users to access blogging websites.

Nonetheless, as of 2009, according to the CIA World Factbook, 8.214 million internet users in Iran, ranked 35th in the world. Blogs range from updates on art and critiquing movies, to following injustices of political prisoners. Diasporic Persian and Iranian blogs have also become a trend as a means to be part of an international online community. Blogs may be used as a virtual form of social protest without physical assembly, such as when thousands of bloggers renamed their blogs Akbar Ganji for a week in 2005, in support of the critic of the regime who had gotten arrested that year. Hossien Derakhshan, the unofficial "godfather" of the blogosphere, set his blog up in Canada in September 2001. He was later arrested. In 2011, Iranian authorities executed more than six hundred people and imprisoned more journalists and bloggers than any other country.

== Scope ==
The broad usage of weblogs in Iran was staggering. As of 2004, the NITLE (National Institute for Technology in Liberal Education) blog census found the number of blogs in Persian surpassed 64,000. Some believe that the influence of these blogs have been exaggerated, in that their authors are predominantly upper and upper-middle class. However, the education system in Iran gives access to education and therefore new technologies, computers and the internet as a whole to large numbers of lower-class people.

== Political importance ==
Blogging in Iran took on political importance as the regime continued its crackdown on journalists. The Iranian press is highly regulated, especially under the Press Law, which according to the UNHCR, "forbids the publication of ideas that are contrary to Islamic principles or detrimental to public rights." This includes imprisonment for "propaganda," which remains undefined, and for offenses that are "an insult to religion."

Because as many as 100 publications were shut down in the early 2000s, many sought alternative outlets for reporting and freedom of expression. This often came about in critiques of the regime, which was relatively unregulated until 2004. Implicit and explicit condemnation is common, such as is evident in the following excerpts.

"11 July 2003: On occasion something happens in life that makes you want to believe in miracles. Like today! Coming across a copy of Kieslowski's Three colours Blue/ White/ Red among the videos at home- without anyone remembering having borrowed it from a friend... This was one of those majestic miracles that only a higher being can bestow on a special someone like me. Thank You God!"

The viewing of movies in ones home is forbidden, as are most western films. More explicit expressions of dissent as also common: "25 November 2002: Every Day new intrigues and tyrannies by our repressive turbaned rulers...And crazy Muslims around the world that bring nothing but carnage and shame...I swear to god...if it weren't for clergy like Eshkavari who keep telling us that what they do is not Islam...I would abandon this little faith once and for all"

Iranian officials became concerned that the 2004 Orange Revolution in Ukraine might induce foreign attempts to support a similar revolution in Iran, by building civil society networks and empowering activists as had happened in Ukraine. This was compounded by the 2006 announcement by the U.S. State Department that it was creating a $75 million fund to "reach out to the people of Iran". This caused the Iranian government to closely monitor foreign support for bloggers and journalists.

In 2004 the government began to arrest and charge bloggers as political dissidents. It also began demanding shutdowns and screening of internet service providers, a big step in restriction that had been relatively unregulated.

In 2005 the BBC World Service Trust started the Iran Media Development Project, to support new media in Iran, following on from earlier projects such as Jadid Media funded by the Netherlands. In 2006 it created a secure training and mentoring website for aspiring Iranian and Afghan bloggers and journalists, with an online magazine edited by Sina Motalebi for the trainees supported by a radio programme for young people in Iran, called ZigZag.

Circa 2006 estimates suggested there were about 500,000 to 800,000 blogs in Iran, though not all were active.

In 2009, internet users and particularly bloggers and online journalists were targeted for arrest and violence after the contested re-election of Mahmoud Ahmadinejad who won by a landslide, inciting fraud allegations. Critical publications were shut down and the largest number of journalists were jailed since the 1979 revolution. The Press Law was also formally extended to "all internet publications" which may include blogs, requiring the authors to get licenses. According to ONI, with the sophisticated system of internet filtering developed by Iran, the websites Blogger and Persianblog are often blocked. Yet in response to the vitality of the Iranian blogosphere, the government decided to pursue other tactics simultaneously, announcing in late 2008 its intention to create thousands of pro government blogs, including one by the president himself. Thus the internet, and in particular blogs became an important front in informal political debate, declarations, and dissatisfaction.

== Hossein Derakhshan ==
Born in Iran in 1975, Hossein Derakhshan, commonly referred to as the "blogging godfather" or the "blogfather," moved to Canada in 2000. His blog became the first Persian blog, and took off in 2001 with his simple instruction manual on how to set up and write a Persian-language blog. In 2003 his blog became highly political, encouraging opposition through writing.

In 2006 he went back to the middle east, visited Egypt and met with Egyptian blogger when the Egyptian blogosphere was also at its peak activity. In the same tour Hissein visited Israel publicly, seeking to mend relations between Iran and Israel, which are sworn enemies. In the same year, he also backed presidential candidate Ahmadinejad. In 2008 he was arrested while visiting family in Iran and was sentenced to 19 and a half years in prison, banned from political party membership for five years, and ordered to repay earnings of around $44,500 for "propagating against the regime" and "co-operating with hostile states." In 2010 he was temporarily released on bail of 1.5 million dollars.

== Shirin Ebadi nobel peace prize news ==
The power of the Iranian blogs was demonstrated in 2003, with the Iranian human rights lawyer Shirin Ebadi winning the Nobel Peace Prize. Because her human rights work had much to do with representing women, children, and dissidents against the regime, the official Iranian news failed to report the win. Several hours later it included in the nightly news a 15-second mention of the win, while failing to report her actual accomplishments aside for "a children's charity." Rather than traditional channels, therefore, the news and reactions to it spread on multiple blogs. Nasrin Alavi, author of We Are Iran, brings the statistics of www.damasanj.com, a website which works out which stories are most talked about in the Iranian blogosphere, which found that Ebadi dominated the top ten Rankings. 8 Most were congratulatory, and sought to provide bios and facts on the nature of Ebadi's work, which the traditional press had failed to print. Bloggers went a step farther when they organized a reception for Ebadi at the Teheran airport upon her return on October 14, 2003. They called for people to celebrate her victory, as well as use the venue to protest the current situation of women's rights and oppression. Rather than the media, it was bloggers that provided up to date pictures of the reception to the public. Thousands of people attended, proving that bloggers could translate to actual events. Eventually this forced the government to respond to Ebadi's Prize in a more serious light: it cast Ebadi as an apostate and a member of a foreign conspiracy against Iran.

== Bam ==
The December 2003 Bam earthquake caused particular outrage and made clear the necessity for blogging as a news source. While the regime was ill-equipped to deal with the disaster where an estimated 30,000 people lost their lives. The aftermath was tremendous in damages, and a lack of journalists to cover the quake. Blogs, therefore, became a central source of information. For example, Dr. Marajan Haj-Ahmadi's blog became one of the most read, as she was based in the bordering city of Kerman and was able to report from the area and provide information as to the medical inadequacies. Others included Baba's blog, an anonymous ex-newspaper journalist who entered the region to provide accurate news reports from the disaster zone. The survivors of the Bam earthquake also began protesting due to lack of governmental support, which went unreported in the official news but the shooting of two individuals at a Friday prayer was reported by bloggers.

In her book "We are Iran: The Persian Blogs" Nasrin Alavi claims that the earthquake was a turning point for blogs being organizing forces as well as partnering with NGO's rather than governmental organizations:

Bloggers like 'Shineh' got involved in a variety of NGOs organizing their own collection points and the transportation of aid in many parts of Iran. They were sometimes able to notify their fellow bloggers of the whereabouts of survivors relocated to hospitals in urban centers. They organized hospital visits, charity sales, and recruited volunteers ready to help in Bam

— (p. 260)

The translation from a virtual page into actual human mobility lent legitimacy to the blogger movement, as well as proving it to be a resilient form of networking that had practical applications. It also proved the fears of the government in that it began to resemble a movement rather than simply disconnected expressions of personal experiences.

=== Transition to Facebook ===
While blogging remains a key form of political protest, in the 2009 uprisings, Facebook began to take a more central role. The physical, rather than virtual protests spread through word-of-mouth rather than blogs. When possible, instances of police abuse were captured on mobile phone videos and then uploaded to YouTube, most famously the video of Neda Agha Soltan being shot to death in the streets of Teheran. These videos were shared on Facebook, fueling the protests. Originally blocked by the government in 2006, it had been unblocked in 2009, just months before the protests.

== Language: the Use of English and other foreign languages ==
More recently, Persian has become just one of many Iranian blog languages. English in particular is used. This is both because it is a relatively well known second language due to high education levels, and to expose the outside world to the goings on in Iran. Several influential bloggers made a plea to other bloggers to use this medium to increase international outrage at the Iranian regime. It also seeks to provide a lens from which to see the Iranian people as separate from their repressive government. Additionally, many blogs being read are written abroad by diasporic communities of Iranians throughout the globe. Many of their families left during the Brain-drain following the Islamic revolution in 1979 and after, creating a dedicated politically motivated and educated author base. These people use their native or adopted languages in addition to Persian.

== Women in blogging ==
Some of the most popular Iranian bloggers are women. The outlet often provides a means to escape the need to identify oneself openly, particularly as family honor can be associated with women. The internet provides a means to talk about the restrictions on women, including the mandatory Hijab. Women can communicate with men openly as contributors of commentators on each other's blog, even having virtual boyfriends online. They can talk about premarital sex, underground parties, alcohol and other youth activities often frowned upon or considered illegal. It also allows for following fashion trends, music, and feminist news. For example, one blogger addresses the issue of prostitution under the regime, which is formally denied. "22 August 2003: some facts: The rate of runaway girls has grown 20 times between the periods of 1986-1999, with the average age of girls now 14.7...the average age of prostitutes has dropped from 27 to 20 years." Due to the extremely high education rate of women, females even surpassing males in enrollment in university, access and literacy are readily available. Some popular female bloggers include 2003 student uprisings Iran In 2003 there were a series of student uprisings throughout the country, despite widespread repression during 1999 riots. largely reported on blogs, providing news and updates for others, while it was not being reported by the press. This allowed for more organized, planned protests. Eventually they too were repressed, but not without using the internet and blogs as a means to defy authority.

== Timeline ==
=== 2001 ===
- 7 September - The first Persian blog is published by Hossein Derakhshan, using manual coding.
- 25 September - The blog using manual coding is published.
- 5 November - Instructions on "How to make a blog in Persian" using Blogger's free service is published, in response to readers' requests.

=== 2002 ===
- 2 June - Cappuccino magazine is launched.
- 13 June - PersianBlog.com, the first free blog service in Persian, is launched. Persianblog.com co-founded by Sahand Ghanoun, Behrang Fouladi, Ata Khalighi Sigaroudi, and Reza Hashemi.
- 10 November - BlogSky.com, the second free blog service in Persian, is launched.

=== 2003 ===
- 31 March - Persianblog service lists its weblog updates in the global weblogs.com directory. Dave Winer, names Iran a hot place for weblogs.
- 20 April - Sina Motallebi, journalist and blogger is arrested.
- 26 September - Cafe Blog opens in northern Tehran.
- 24 November - Mohammad-Ali Abtahi, then Vice President for Legal and Parliamentary Affairs, starts Webnevesht, the first blog by a member of the Iranian cabinet.

=== 2004 ===
- 16 January - Protesting MPs on sit-in start a weblog.
- 6 June - Persian Blogging festival starts.
- November - Iranian blogger Mojtaba Saminejad arrested for writing about the arrests of three other bloggers.

=== 2005 ===
- 5 January - Saeed Mortazavi, Tehran's Chief prosecutor, ordered major ISPs to filter PersianBlog and other blogging service websites.
- 27 January/12 February - Iranian blogger Mojtaba Saminejad briefly released, then rearrested
- October Blog Herald estimate: 700,000 Iranian blogs, of which about 10% are active
- 11 October - Blogging courses starts in the holy city of Qom, the traditional home of Iran's religious establishment. They are run by the newly established office of religious weblog expansion.

=== 2006 ===
- Persian language was listed by Technorati among 10 most common languages among bloggers.
- 14 August - President Ahmadinejad starts his multilingual blog with one long entry.
- 13 September - Mojtaba Saminejad is released from prison, after serving term.
- December: Mehrnoush Najafi Ragheb won city council election in Hamedan.
- 4 December: Masoumeh Ebtekar, the first female vice president of Iran starts her blog in Persian.

=== 2007 ===
- 24 December: Almost a year after starting her blog in Persian, Massoumeh Ebtekar starts her blog in English, under the title "Persian Paradox".

=== 2008 ===
- 28 January - Parsweblog.com, the first free blog service based on wordpress in Persian, is launched by Mohammad hasan abbasi
- 1 November: Hossein Derakhshan, credited with starting the blogging revolution in Iran and frequently called "the father of Persian blogs" was arrested at his family home in Tehran, not long after arriving there. He was allowed four calls to his family, each lasting about one minute, during November. Amnesty International suggested that he was likely to face charges of "insulting religion", but he had not yet been charged as of mid-December.
- November: Revolutionary Guards announced their plan to launch 10000 blogs.
- 30 December: Alireza Jamshidi, the speaker of the Judicial system of Iran confirmed Derakhshan's arrest, said that Derakhshan was in the custody of the Islamic Revolutionary Court, that his case was in early discovery phase, and that among the accusations were that Derakhshan had allegedly written about the "Pure Imams".

=== 2009 ===
- 1 January: Iranian's own video sharing site "IranianYouTube.com" was created
- late April: Hossein Derakhshan remained under detention and had not been charged.
- June: Vahid Online broadcast live footage of the raids to Mir-Hossein Mousavi campaign headquarters in Gheytarieh online.

=== 2010 ===
- 28 September: Hossein Derakhshan received a 19½ year jail sentence.
- 8 October: Hossein Ronaghi-Maleki, often described as 'genius' blogger, was sentenced to 15 years in prison. According to Reporters Without Borders, he was alleged to have written and used software to combat filtering and to host and support websites and blogs that defend human rights.

=== 2011 ===
- January: the Cyber Police unit, known by the acronym FATA, is created. The unit was created to "control which sites Iranians are able to visit, to prevent spying and protect the public from 'immoral' material. The United States, they charge, is waging a 'soft war' against Iran by reaching out to Iranians online and inciting them to overthrow their leaders" The unit has focused both on bloggers critical of Iran's leaders, and non-political activities such as a group of youths who had created a "hot or not" contest on Facebook rating profile pictures of boys and girls

=== 2012 ===
- January: Judicial authorities arrest "at least half a dozen journalists and bloggers" as part of is thought to be "a pre-emptive campaign ... to thwart protests" connected to the campaigns for the early March parliamentary election. This despite the fact that none of the bloggers "seem to have been politically active or to have published anything that might be considered seditious". The arrests were not made public in the government media and specific charges against the bloggers were "unclear".
- 30 October: Sattar Beheshti, a relatively minor figure" among Iran's bloggers, is arrested by the Cyberpolice (FATA) for "actions against national security on social networks and Facebook", after posting a criticism of the Islamic Republic addressed to the Supreme Leader and allegedly receiving threatening messages.
- 31 October: Beheshti issues "an official letter to the head of the prison" stating: "I, Sattar Beheshti, was arrested by FATA and beaten and tortured with multiple blows to my head and body, ... I want to write that if anything happens to me, the police are responsible".
- 6 November: authorities tell Beheshti's family "to collect his body". He reportedly died two days earlier.
- circa 10 November: 41 prisoners from Ward 350 of Tehran's Evin prison, where Beheshti was reportedly held for one night, issued a letter "claiming that signs of torture were visible on the blogger's body".
- 1 December: Iranian's national police chief, Ismael Ahmadi-Moqaddam dismisses General Saeed Shokrian, commander of FATA (the cybercrimes police unit), for negligence in Beheshti's death, stating "Tehran's FATA should be held responsible for the death of Sattar Beheshti".

=== 2016 ===
- May: the Iranian government announced the arrest of eight women involved in online modeling without a mandatory head scarf. Mehdi Abutorabi, a blogger who managed a publishing tool called Persian Blog, was also detained.

=== 2018 ===
- 11 September - Dorsablog.com, the free blog service in Persian, is launched. Dorsablog.com co-founded by Hossein Hezami.

=== 2026 ===
- In November Revolutionary Guard Courts sentenced man to death over X microblogger posts.

== Related books ==
- We Are Iran: The Persian Blogs by Nasrin Alavi (Soft Skull Press /November 28, 2005) ISBN 1-933368-05-5
- We the Media: Grassroots Journalism by the People, for the People by Dan Gillmor (O'Reilly, 2004) ISBN 0-596-00733-7

== Academic papers ==
- Rahimi, Babak (September 2003). Cyberdissent: The Internet in Revolutionary Iran. Middle East Review of International Affairs, Interdisciplinary Center (IDC) Herzliya , 7(3).
- Doostdar, Alireza (Dec. 2004). "The Vulgar Spirit of Blogging": On Language, Culture, and Power in Persian Weblogestan. American Anthropologist 106(4).
- Jensen, Peder Are Nøstvold (Sep. 2004). A Case Study of Iranian English Language Weblogs, inside and outside of the Islamic Republic of Iran.
- Farrell, Henry and Drezner, Daniel W. (Aug. 2004). The Power and Politics of Blogs.
- Simmons, Erin A. (Jun. 2005). The Impact of the Weblog: A Case Study of The United States and Iran.
- Alexanian, Janet A. (Nov. 2006). Publicly Intimate Online: Iranian Web Logs in Southern California. Comparative Studies of South Asia, Africa and the Middle East, Duke University Press 26(1)
- Halevi, Jordan. (March 2006). The Iranian Weblog Research Project: Survey Results.
- Hendelman-Baavur, Liora (June 2007). "Promises and Perils of Weblogistan: Online Personal Journals and the Islamic Republic of Iran". The Middle East Review of International Affairs, 11(2).
- PetrossianL, Celine (2006). Liberating the Silenced: Iranian Bloggers in the Diaspora, California State University, Northridge.
- Sreberny, Annabelle (2007). 'Becoming Intellectual: The Blogestan and Public Political Space in the Islamic Republic', British Journal of Middle Eastern Studies, vol.34, No. 3, pp. 267–286
- Kelly, John and Bruce Etling (April 2008). Mapping Iran's Online Public: Politics and Culture in the Persian Blogosphere.
- Nafisi, Arman (June 2008). "Blogging Outside Iran: A Tool for Internal Democratic Change?". Center for Communication and Civic Engagement, University of Washington.
- IHRDC (May 2009). Ctrl+Alt+Delete: Iran's Response to the Internet.

== See also ==
- Internet in Iran
- Media of Iran
- Internet censorship in Iran
- Communications in Iran
- International rankings of Iran
