= Sunoikisis =

Sunoikisis is a "collaboration advancing teaching, curricular development and scholarship in Classical studies" of the Associated Colleges of the South (ACS). Sunoikisis was created as part of the Mellon-ACS Pilot Project in Classics and funded by the Mellon Foundation. The goal of the initiative was to build a digital infrastructure that would support a wide range of collaborative efforts among the fifteen institutions of the Associated Colleges of the South. By creating a virtual department of classics, ACS students would have access to the best instruction and scholarly resources in the world without compromising the supportive environment students have at each college of the liberal arts in the consortium. In 2006 the Sunoikisis initiative became a national project as it came under the auspicies of NITLE.
