= Ragheb =

Given name and surname

Ragheb or Raghib is an Arabic given name and surname meaning desirous. Notable people with the name include:

- Ragheb Aga (born 1984), Kenyan cricketer
- Raghib Ahsan, politician and member of the Constituent Assembly of India
- Ragheb Alama (born 1962), Lebanese singer, dancer, composer, television personality, philanthropist
- Ragib Ali (born 1936), British industrialist
- Raghib Allie-Brennan (born 1991), American politician and former political aide
- Raghib al-Alami, the mayor of Gaza City between 1965 and 1970
- Ali Abu Al-Ragheb (1946–2026), the 33rd Prime Minister of Jordan
- Al-Raghib al-Isfahani, eleventh-century Muslim scholar of Qur'anic exegesis and the Arabic language
- Raghib al-Nashashibi (1881–1951), CBE (hon), was a wealthy landowner and public figure
- Ragheb Harb (1952–1984), Lebanese leader and Muslim cleric
- Raghib Ismail (born 1969), American retired player of American and Canadian football
- Ragheb Moftah (1898–2001), Egyptian musicologist and scholar of the Coptic music heritage
- Raghib Pasha (1819–1884), Greek Ottoman politician and Prime Minister of Egypt
- Awad Ragheb (born 1982), retired Jordanian footballer of Palestinian origin
- Mehrnoush Najafi Ragheb (born 1979), Iranian lawyer, Persian blogger, women's rights activist
- Mohamed El-Malky Ragheb (born 1953), Egyptian wrestler
- Mohamed Ragheb (born 1943), Syrian sports shooter
- Khalid Raghib (born 1969), Moroccan former footballer
- Ragheb Sergani, Egyptian professor of urology at Cairo University

== See also ==
- Ragıp, Turkish version of the name
- Raqeeb, 2007 film
