= Mehdi Mousavi =

Iranian poet

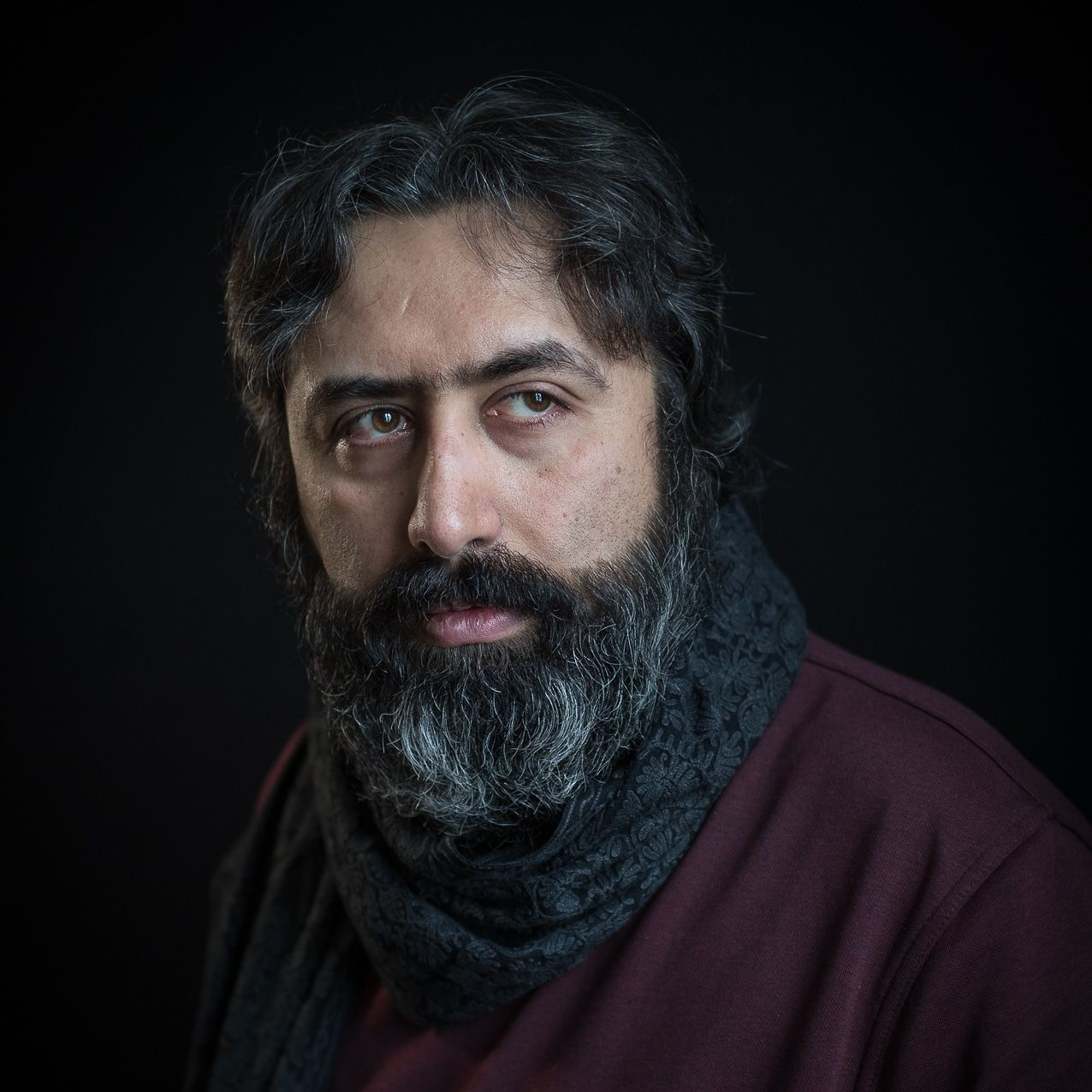
- Native name: سید مهدی موسوی
- Born: Seyed Mehdi Mousavi; 2 October 1976 Tehran, Iran
- Occupation: Poet; pharmacist
- Language: Persian
- Education: PHD of Pharmacy
- Literary movement: Postmodern Ghazal

Website
- mehdimousavi.net

Mehdi Mousavi, also Mehdi Moosavi, also Seyed Mahdi Mousavi (Persian: سید مهدی موسوی) (born 1976) is an Iranian poet, novelist, lyricist and trained pharmacist. He is regarded as one of the leading figures of Iran’s post-modern ghazal movement and is known for his socially engaged poetry and literary activism. Mousavi was arrested in 2013 along with poet Fateme Ekhtesari, and later sentenced to nine years in prison and 99 lashes. A group of poets and writers signed a petition calling for their release. He escaped from Iran in December 2015. Mousavi now lives in Lillehammer, Norway, where he arrived in January 2017 as part of the international Cities of Refuge Network.

== Early life and education ==
Mousavi was born in 1976 in Tehran and grew up in the nearby city of Karaj. He began writing short stories and poetry in childhood and published his first poems as a teenager. His early teachers encouraged his interest in literature, and by the late 1990s he had become active in Karaj’s literary circles. He later studied pharmacy at the Mashhad University of Medical Sciences, where he earned a doctorate. During his student years he faced disciplinary pressure for organising underground literary workshops and readings.

== Career ==
Two collections of poems entitled Suddenly and Beeping for the Sheep were denied permission for publication by the authorities. Many more of his poems denied publication were published online.

Most of the works by this movement has faced severe censorship by the Iranian officials, and almost all of these works were banned in Iran, and have therefore been distributed underground.

Mousavi has run creative writing workshops where he has been teaching writing of poetry, short-stories and novels. Banned from meeting in public, they would often meet in people’s homes. The workshops were regularly shut down by the Iranian authorities, who placed Mousavi and several of his peers under surveillance.

Mehdi Mousavi also holds a PhD in Pharmacy, and owned and ran his own pharmacy in Ilam, Iran, from 2012-2015.

== Literary Activities in Iran ==
Mehdi Mousavi is widely regarded by many as a leading figure in post-modern ghazal poetry. According to critics and readers, he is considered one of the most significant and influential poets in Iran since the Islamic Revolution. Many of his poems have entered the collective memory of Iranians, appearing in public spaces such as graffiti or being used in personal forms of expression, including tattoos.

In addition to his poetic work, Mousavi has influenced the contemporary literary scene through his creative writing workshops, where a number of prominent Iranian poets of the 2000s and 2010s spent periods of study. His works and the broader impact of postmodern ghazal on contemporary literature have been the subject of numerous academic articles and theses.

In recent years, the publication and distribution of his works have been banned in Iran, and his books have been removed from the market by state authorities. Nevertheless, his poetry continues to circulate through informal and underground channels, including book vendors, and maintains a wide readership. His online presence has also attracted a large audience, and his blog was recognized multiple times as one of the most popular blogs on PersianBlog.

Mousavi has published more than twenty poetry collections, many of which have gone through multiple editions. His works have been translated into several languages, and he has participated in poetry readings and lectures in various countries.

=== Literary beginnings ===
Mehdi Mousavi began writing stories in early childhood and started composing poetry at the age of eleven. He has attributed his initial interest in poetry to his literature teacher, Shahram Foroughi, and described his first poem as a humorous mathnavi. He has also cited poetical contest (Mushaira) as an early source of motivation for his writing.

During middle school, Mousavi—then a high-achieving student at a gifted school in Karaj—gradually developed a stronger interest in literature and received several awards in provincial and national student competitions. Upon entering high school and becoming familiar with neo-classical poets such as Qeysar Aminpour, Hossein Monzavi, and Mohammad-Ali Bahmani, the style of his work began to change. He later described this period as a phase of “linguistic renewal and the formation of critical thinking.”

During this time, he also connected with other poets of his generation through national student competitions and literary festivals, and began publishing his works under pseudonyms in periodicals such as Kayhan-e Farhangi, Javanan-e Emrooz, and the newspaper Ettela'at.

=== 1990s and the Emergence of Postmodern Ghazal ===
In the mid-1990s, Mehdi Mousavi’s participation in the Karaj Poetry Association and his acquaintance with Ali Karimi Kalayeh and Mohammadreza Haj-Rostambeglu led to the publication of a joint poetry collection by the three young poets in early 1998. The collection I Am Full of Stars, But…, published by Shahriar Publishing, consisted largely of Mousavi’s neo-classical ghazals; however, due to its innovative language and the use of contemporary vocabulary such as “jazz“ or “diazepam,” it faced strong criticism from some traditionalist poets.

During the same period, Mousavi became associated with the narrative ghazal movement, which at the time was referred to as formalistic ghazal. However, his engagement with the language-centered poetics of Reza Baraheni, as well as his proximity to Baraheni’s students, along with his own critiques of narrative ghazal, led him to distance himself from that movement. He subsequently developed more radical works that incorporated linguistic experimentation and postmodern techniques within metrical and rhymed forms. These works attracted both strong support and criticism in contemporary literary circles.

A selection of these poems was prepared for publication under the title The Angels Have Committed Suicide in 2000, but it was denied publication by Ministry of Culture and Islamic Guidance. After two years of unsuccessful attempts to obtain permission, Mousavi published the book underground in 2002, accompanied by illustrations by Meysam Alipour. The book was distributed in Iran through Mousavi’s personal website (and later blog), titled “Postmodern Ghazal and...,” and received significant attention, reaching a second edition within a few months. In 2003, a free electronic version of the book was also made available on the literary website Maniha.

The publication of this book is considered by many to mark the emergence of postmodern ghazal in Iran, and numerous academic articles and theses have examined its role in shaping poetry and lyrics in the 2000s.

=== Online Presence and Literary Festivals ===
With the rise of Persian-language blogging, Mehdi Mousavi discontinued his website “Postmodern Ghazal and...” in 2002 and launched a blog under the same name, which quickly gained popularity and became one of the most widely read Persian-language blogs. The publication of uncensored poetry, growing interest among younger audiences in postmodern ghazal, and the blog’s role as a source for developments in contemporary literature contributed to its success. Mousavi was recognized in several editions of the PersianBlog awards as one of the most popular or best literary bloggers. However, the blog was repeatedly filtered or removed by judicial authorities, and media outlets affiliated with the Islamic Revolutionary Guard Corps published criticism of it.

Mousavi’s move to Mashhad for further studies, along with his literary workshops in the city and the success of his students in literary festivals, contributed to his wider recognition. During the 2000s, he received first-place awards at a number of independent literary festivals. He also served as a judge or scientific secretary at various poetry and fiction festivals. His participation in festivals and public readings was at times accompanied by controversies, including protests regarding judging processes or pressure from conservative groups.

His lectures and workshops in cities such as Shahroud, Kerman, Babolsar, Karaj, and Tehran attracted significant attention from younger audiences, while also drawing criticism from state-affiliated newspapers and news agencies. In addition, the publication of his essays on postmodern ghazal in literary journals contributed to the consolidation of his position as a theorist and critic.

=== Theorization of Postmodern Ghazal ===
Mehdi Mousavi published three influential essaysbetween 1999 and 2002 —A Genealogy of Postmodern Ghazal, Identifiers of Postmodern Ghazal, and An Essay on the Contemporary Ghazal—which played a significant role in the development of postmodern ghazal and in drawing the attention of critics and academic circles to this movement.

In A Genealogy of Postmodern Ghazal, he traces the roots of the movement in earlier Persian poetry, examining examples of postmodern techniques and ideas in works from the fourth century up to the Constitutional period. In Identifiers of Postmodern Ghazal, he analyzes recurring features and techniques of these poems, providing examples and discussing the philosophical foundations of each. In An Essay on the Contemporary Ghazal, he offers a critical overview of modern Persian ghazal from the 1960s to the 2000s, focusing on three main currents: neo-classical ghazal, narrative (formalistic) ghazal, and postmodern ghazal.

These essays have been widely cited in literary scholarship over the past two decades, and are regarded by some as a “three-part manifesto” of postmodern ghazal.

=== Works of the 2000s ===
Following the refusal of publication permits for The Angels Have Committed Suicide, a short story collection titled The Verticals, and an anti-war poetry collection titled Addressed to Ostriches, Mehdi Mousavi decided in 2004 to publish a selection of his romantic and narrative works, which had attracted less scrutiny, through Sokhan Gostar Publishing in Mashhad.

The resulting collection, I Publish These Only Because of You, was released at the 2005 Tehran International Book Fair and, due to its relatively simple and romantic tone, was quickly received by readers and reached a second edition. Critics noted the ironic nature of the title and praised the collection for its engagement with women’s voices, its reflection of social issues, and its innovative language.

Following a change in government that same year and the election of Mahmoud Ahmadinejad, Mehdi Mousavi was again placed under restrictions and was unable to publish any books until 2010. In May 2010, he published the 308-page poetry collection Little Bird, Neither a Bird Nor Little!, which is regarded by some critics as one of his most significant works and a major contribution to postmodern ghazal. Although the book was published with extensive censorship, it attracted considerable attention upon its release at the Tehran International Book Fair, drawing large crowds. However, on the second day of the fair, the book—along with works by other postmodern ghazal poets including Fatemeh Ekhtesari, Elham Mizban, and Mohammad Hosseini-Moghaddam—was removed from the exhibition and later destroyed. The action was reportedly prompted by the insertion of previously censored words into the books by Mousavi and the other poets, as well as the distribution of an errata sheet indicating the censored sections. As a result, Sokhan Gostar Publishing had its activities suspended for one year on the grounds of allegedly circumventing censorship and publishing taboo-breaking works. In response, the four poets released uncensored electronic versions of their works online free of charge.

The collection Little Bird, Neither a Bird Nor Little! has been the subject of numerous academic studies, and is regarded by some as a high point of postmodern ghazal, featuring notable examples of its style. Its philosophical approach, linguistic experimentation, psychological depth, polyphony, and the development of new poetic forms and structures have been widely discussed in critical literature.

=== Postmodern Ghazal Festival ===
In 2007, Mousavi, who had previously organized literary festivals such as Goriz-e Ahovaneh and Shadows, launched the nationwide Postmodern Ghazal Festival. At the closing ceremony, held in Tehran under the direction of Hamed Darab and Reza Sahraei, dozens of prominent poets associated with the movement performed readings. Selected works, chosen by Fatemeh Ekhtesari and Mona Zendedel, were later published in an underground anthology titled Geryeh Ruye Shaneh-ye Tokhm-e Morgh (lit. "Crying on the Shoulder of an Egg Tray", with the title playing on the dual meaning of the Persian word shaneh, which can mean both "shoulder" and "egg tray"), featuring an introduction by Mohammad-Ali Bahmani.

The event was designed as a performance-based program and included several unconventional and satirical elements that challenged conventional cultural formats, such as the playing of a children's song instead of the national anthem of the Islamic Republic of Iran, the participation of thirteen presenters, the presence of performers acting as traditional ceremonial guards carrying wooden staffs to maintain order, the serving of bread, cheese, herbs, and walnuts to guests, and the simultaneous performance of a poem in three different languages. Several hours before the festival was scheduled to begin, security authorities reportedly shut down the original venue in an attempt to prevent the event from taking place. In response, the organizers quickly rented a residential house commonly used for celebrations and relocated the participating poets, many of whom had traveled to Tehran from different parts of the country. The festival has been described by critics as one of the most significant independent literary festivals of the 2000s in Iran.

=== Works of the 2010s, before leaving Iran ===
Following the withdrawal of Parandeh Kuchulu, Na Parandeh Bud! Na Kuchulu! ("Little Bird, It Was Neither a Bird nor Little!"), several other books by Mousavi, including Naghahan ("Suddenly") and Honking for Sheep, were also denied publication permits. In 2011, Fatemeh Ekhtesari compiled Mousavi's blog posts on poetic meter and published them as an electronic book titled Introductory Prosody in Simple Language. The short volume was a condensed version of Mousavi's larger instructional work on prosody and rhyme, Prosody in Three Days. After his arrest in 2013, the draft manuscript of that book, along with several other unpublished works, was reportedly confiscated and destroyed by the intelligence organization of the Islamic Revolutionary Guard Corps.

The free online publication of Introductory Prosody in Simple Language gained considerable circulation on social media, and a number of instructors of Persian prosody described it as a simpler and more practical alternative to the instructional works of Sirus Shamisa. During the same year, Mousavi also released two underground audio collections of poetry recitations, Dance in Dust and Dance in Mud. His performance style, which emphasized vocal experimentation and the disruption of conventional aesthetics and traditional recitation techniques, attracted discussion and critical attention when combined with his rebellious poetry.

in 2012, seeking to circumvent censorship restrictions, Mousavi published a collection of his ruba'i (quatrains) alongside photographs by Mohammad-Sadegh Yarhamidi under the title The Man Who Hasn’t Left Returns, presented as a photographic collection. The work quickly went through additional printings and became difficult to obtain on the market. Critics praised both his command of the ruba'i form and his innovative approach to the traditional poetic structure. In the same year, Mousavi was able to publish his anti-war collection, originally titled Addressing Ostriches, after renaming it Even the House Number and removing more than ten poems. The collection reached a second printing within the first days of its release at the Tehran Book Fair. Critics praised the work for its focus on the consequences of war, particularly its impact on the post-war generation. However, some news agencies affiliated with the Islamic Revolutionary Guard Corps criticized the book, describing it as a negative portrayal of the Iran–Iraq War and questioning the government's decision to grant it publication approval.

In early 2013, Mousavi published a selection of his uncensored poems in Paris under the title Ghazash Bademjan Ast (It's food is Eggplant). He also published a selection of his earlier works in Iran under the title Drowning in the Aquarium, which appeared with approximately 200 pages removed due to censorship. Although media outlets affiliated with the Islamic Revolutionary Guard Corps criticized the book and Mousavi was prevented from attending the Tehran International Book Fair, the volume reached its third printing during the fair. Despite receiving positive critical attention for its technical and thematic qualities, the collection was also criticized because of the extensive censorship and omissions in the published edition.

While pressure on Mousavi was increasing and he was serving a prison sentence, two additional poetry collections by him—With the Mice and After the Rain, Before Exile—were published. The books were met with strong criticism from Iran's state broadcaster (IRIB), the Basij Student Organization, and newspapers affiliated with the Islamic Revolutionary Guard Corps. Some commentators argued that the publication permits granted to the works of an imprisoned poet reflected political tensions between the government and the IRGC. Despite having been released on bail, Mousavi was barred by security authorities from attending the Tehran International Book Fair. On the second day of the fair, the Fars News Agency published a report falsely claiming that After the Rain, Before Exile was a collection of poems by Shahin Najafi. Although the claim was denied by the Ministry of Culture and Islamic Guidance and by officials of the book fair, following the closure of Nasira Publishing, Mousavi's book was also withdrawn from circulation and pulped.

Mousavi's last poetry collection published in Iran was The Extinction of the Iranian Leopard Through the Excessive Growth of the Sheep Population, released in the winter of 2014. The book was well received by readers and reached its third printing within its first week of publication. Its appearance at the 2015 Tehran International Book Fair prompted criticism from media outlets affiliated with the Islamic Revolutionary Guard Corps, which, in reports similar to those directed at his earlier books, accused it of containing "sexual content, insults to religious sanctities, homosexuality, insults to the Islamic Revolution, mockery of security forces, and propaganda against the system." The collection consisted of new poems written by Mousavi on a daily basis between Nowruz and the autumn of 2014. According to Mousavi, he began writing the book after learning that the Islamic Revolutionary Guard Corps had destroyed all of his handwritten poems, laptop, hard drives, and other copies of his work, resulting in the permanent loss of his unpublished writings. He later described the writing of those poems and the publication of The Extinction of the Iranian Leopard Through the Excessive Growth of the Sheep Population as an act of resistance against those who fear art and literature.

== Literary Activities After Leaving Iran ==
Mehdi Mousavi is among the writers who, after leaving Iran, maintained his connection with the Persian language and Persian-speaking audiences. Following his departure from Iran in 2015, he published two novels and three poetry collections in Persian and continued conducting his literary workshops online. His poems and song lyrics continued to be performed and recorded by well-known singers, and he also appeared in literary programs on Persian-language television channels. In recent years, his works have been translated into several languages, including English, German, Norwegian, French, Dutch, Spanish, and Hebrew. Although the sale of his books has been officially banned in Iran, his works have continued to circulate through underground channels and have retained a substantial readership. He has also made electronic editions of all the books he has published outside Iran freely available online for readers in Iran and Afghanistan. Mousavi has likewise remained active in other fields, including journalism, satire, and cinema. According to some critics, his more recent works represent the most mature and accomplished poetry and fiction of his literary career.

=== Short Stories and Novels ===
One of Mousavi’s most significant works, which was reportedly destroyed following his arrest by the Intelligence Organization of the Islamic Revolutionary Guard Corps, was a short novel entitled Conversation in Tehran. After arriving in Turkey, Mousavi rewrote the novel—originally completed in 2010—during 2015 and 2016, and published it in 2017 after relocating to Norway. Comprising 93 short chapters and 13 narrators, the novel tells a love story set against the backdrop of the 2009 Iranian presidential election protests and the Green Movement. Conversation in Tehran was well received by readers and became one of the best-selling titles distributed through the informal booksellers of Tehran’s Enghelab Street.Mousavi initially intended to publish the novel outside Iran through Abbas Maroufi’s Gardoon Publishing House. However, due to the limited access of readers in Iran and Afghanistan to online booksellers such as Amazon, he ultimately made the electronic edition available free of charge online. He continued this approach with his subsequent books, and the practice was later adopted by a number of other writers.

An audiobook edition of the novel, featuring more than seventy artists as narrators, was released in October 2018. The novel’s explicit depiction of sexual relationships, the inclusion of LGBTQ+ characters, its polyphonic narrative structure and shifting points of view, as well as its engagement with two major historical events—the mass executions of political prisoners in the 1980s and the 2009 protests—have been among the most frequently discussed aspects of the work in critical assessments.

Mousavi’s second novel, One Thousand and Some Nights, was published in 2021. Conceived as a reimagining and parody of One Thousand and One Nights, the novel constitutes the second installment of a projected four-volume series that began with Conversation in Tehran and is intended to conclude with Stay Alive and The Last Hero. Mousavi spent three years writing the 648-page novel, which consists of 63 chapters and more than one thousand footnotes. The narrator is Hossein, the central character of Conversation in Tehran, who is now living in Norway. At the moment of his death, he revisits memories of his romantic relationships in Thailand, Georgia, and Turkey. Critics have described the work as a postmodern, polygenre reinterpretation of One Thousand and One Nights. Like its literary predecessor, the novel employs a frame narrative and nested storytelling structure. Although it presents a nonlinear account of several love affairs, most critics have regarded it primarily as a psychological and philosophical novel. One Thousand and Some Nights has been the subject of numerous formal, psychological, philosophical, symbolic, mythological, and intertextual analyses, and has received a largely positive reception from both readers and critics. At the same time, some reviewers have strongly criticized the novel’s explicit sexual content and its depictions of drug use.

During these years, the electronic publisher Sayeha also released a volume containing eight short stories by Mehdi Mousavi. The collection includes most of his short fiction written during the 1990s, much of which had never received permission for publication in Iran. In the spring of 2019, an anthology entitled Disturbing Private Minds was published, featuring several short stories by Mehdi Mousavi alongside works by other writers.

=== Poetry Collections ===
During his stay in Turkey, Mehdi Mousavi attempted to publish two poetry collections, Night and Confidential, in Iran; however, both were deemed unpublishable by the authorities. After relocating to Norway, he published his first poetry collection outside Iran in the spring of 2018 under the title Goofing around in Front of the Firing Squad. Like Conversation in Tehran, the collection was distributed internationally through Amazon, while Mousavi made its electronic edition freely available online. The book quickly became one of the best-selling underground titles in Iran, where it circulated through unofficial channels. The collection includes poems written after the publication of The Extinction of the Iranian Leopard Due to the Excessive Increase of Sheep up to the time of Mousavi’s departure from Iran. It also contains a number of poems that had either never received publication permission in Iran or had previously appeared only in heavily censored and revised forms. Many critics and readers have regarded Goofing around in Front of the Firing Squad as one of the most successful works of Mousavi’s career. The collection has been discussed from a variety of perspectives, including psychological interpretation, linguistic innovation, and the use of black humor.

In 2019, Mousavi published another poetry collection entitled In the Samurai Way, comprising works written after his departure from Iran. The volume contains 94 poems, a number that, according to the poet, alludes to the year in which he fled Iran. In contrast to much of his earlier work, many of the poems in this collection focus on themes of imprisonment, exile, and loneliness. The volume also reflects both the poet’s personal struggles and the social and political events that shaped the period in which it was written. As with several of his previous books, the collection was made available free of charge online. It received a positive response from both readers and critics, and has been the subject of numerous scholarly and critical studies, particularly in the fields of psychological criticism and postmodern literary analysis.

In 2023, Mousavi published In Praise of Disappointment, a collection comprising his most recent poems and song lyrics. The title, according to the author, was inspired by works such as Erasmus’s In Praise of Folly, Bertrand Russell’s In Praise of Idleness, Mario Vargas Llosa’s In Praise of the Stepmother, as well as Friedrich Nietzsche’s statement that “hope is the greatest of evils, for it prolongs human suffering.” The collection combines romantic, philosophical, political, and psychological themes, while also displaying considerable formal diversity. References to the Woman, Life, Freedom movement appear throughout many of the poems and lyrics, ranging from impassioned songs that were performed by various singers during the protests to melancholic philosophical poems depicting the atmosphere of that followed the movement’s suppression. The book was generally well received by both readers and critics. However, some commentators criticized what they viewed as the reproduction or endorsement of concepts such as violence and revenge within certain poems in the collection.

=== Participation in Literary Conferences and Festivals in Europe ===
Since settling in Norway, Mehdi Mousavi has given poetry readings and lectures in numerous European cities. He has also participated in artist residencies and guest programs in cities including Lillehammer, Antwerp, Barcelona, Brussels, and Luxembourg. He has appeared at a number of literary festivals across Europe and has also participated as a speaker and workshop instructor at various conferences and cultural events. His talks have addressed topics such as contemporary Persian poetry, the status of women in Iran, political prisoners, Postmodern Ghazal, the role of migration and exile in literature, literary translation, and engaged literature for non-Persian-speaking audiences. In addition, Mousavi has conducted creative writing workshops for both Persian-speaking and non-Persian-speaking participants in different countries.

== Works in Translation ==
Over the past several decades, Mousavi’s works have been translated into a number of languages, a process that intensified following his departure from Iran. In addition to book-length publications, many of his poems and short stories have appeared in non-Persian literary journals and anthologies. His work has been translated into English, Norwegian, Czech, Danish, German, Dutch, French, Hebrew, Arabic, Kurdish, Turkish, and Spanish. In interviews, Mousavi has stated that he is often dissatisfied with translations of his work, arguing that many of his poems rely on linguistic and culturally specific features that are difficult to reproduce in other languages.

Before leaving Iran, some of Mousavi’s writings appeared in a Czech-language anthology translated by Radek Hasalík. Following his departure, Å kysse en ørken, å kysse en myr (To Kiss a Desert, To Kiss a Mire) was published in Norwegian in 2019 as part of a collection featuring several poets.

Mousavi’s works have also appeared in a variety of literary publications in Europe and North America. Among them is Kontinentaldrift: Das Persische Europa (Continental Drift: Persian Europe), a German-language anthology published in 2021 that includes works by Esmail Khoi, Yadollah Royaei, Fatemeh Ekhtesari, and other Persian-language poets.

The first stand-alone translation of Mousavi’s work was The Blood-soaked Liberty Square, translated into Hebrew by Orly Cohen and published in 2021. The book was subsequently discussed and reviewed in a number of academic settings, including universities in Israel.

In 2024, a multilingual anthology entitled The Multilingual Mosaic was published, featuring a selection of Mousavi’s poems translated into seven languages by a group of translators.

In 2026, SIC publishing house published The Last Kiss, a bilingual Persian–English collection of selected poems by Mousavi. Prior to its publication, the project was announced by the publisher, and a presentation event featuring the book’s translators and editors was held in Norway in May 2025.

At the beginning of 2026, Sic Publishing announced that the launch of the book would be postponed due to the nationwide protests in Iran.

The launch was eventually rescheduled for 12 May 2026, but the event was cancelled following security concerns raised by the Norwegian Police Security Service (PST) regarding potential threats.

The bilingual collection The Last Kiss was officially launched at the House of Literature in Oslo on 17 June 2026.

== Creative Writing Workshops ==
Many literary critics consider Mehdi Mousavi’s workshops to be among the most significant creative writing workshops in Iran, placing them alongside those led by Reza Baraheni and Houshang Golshiri. These sessions began in 1999 as underground and free gatherings and continued in virtual form after Mousavi’s migration. A number of prominent Iranian and Afghan poets and writers in the 2000s and 2010s participated in these workshops. From the outset, the Islamic Republic opposed these literary sessions, repeatedly shutting them down or criticizing them through state media and newspapers. The organization of these workshops has been cited as one of the reasons for Mousavi’s arrests in 2010 and 2013.

Although Mousavi had begun his teaching activities in 1997 in Karaj, he systematized his weekly creative writing workshops in Mashhad from autumn 1999 onward. In these workshops, he developed an indirect and interactive teaching method that differed from the dominant pedagogical approaches of the time. Rather than focusing on direct critique of poems and stories, he emphasized cultivating reading and analytical skills. Due to pressure from security institutions, he frequently changed the locations of his sessions and was at times forced to suspend them temporarily. These workshops continued until 2007 and contributed to a transformation in the literary scene of Khorasan. After Mousavi left Mashhad, many of his students began organizing similar workshops in the city, although a number of them were later shut down under pressure from security authorities.

Mousavi continued his literary workshops in Karaj and Tehran from 2007 to 2013. In the final two years, media outlets affiliated with the Islamic Revolutionary Guard Corps, as well as state broadcasting, repeatedly published materials against these sessions, ultimately leading to their closure following Mousavi’s arrest. During this period, he held workshops in his own home, in the homes of participants, and in cafés. Prior to his arrest, he also conducted several poetry and songwriting workshops at the “Panjereh-ye Hekmat” Institute.

After leaving Iran in 2015, Mousavi continued to organize his free workshops online in collaboration with institutions such as Tavaana. At the end of each course, he publishes a collection of poems, short stories, and song lyrics by participants in book form. These courses, known as “Hamsāyeh” (“Neighbor”), have been well received by audiences. However, Mousavi has stated that neither the online sessions are cnot comparable to his literary gatherings in Iran, emphasizing that the outcomes he seeks depend on sustained, long-term interactive sessions.

== Arrest ==
On December 6, 2013, Fatemeh Ekhtesari and Mehdi Moosavi had planned to travel to Turkey for a literary workshop, but they were stopped at the airport. They were told they were under a travel ban, and their passports were confiscated. A few hours later they disappeared and did not appear again until December 24, 2014, when it was known they were in Section 2A of Evin Prison. Torture and other abuse of prisoners is common in the prison, which is controlled by the Intelligence Division of the Islamic Revolution Guards Corps. On January 14, 2014, Ekhtesari and Mousavi were released on bail. Their lawyer said Moosavi was sentenced to six years in prison for "insulting the holy sanctities", three years for "storing tear gas", and 99 lashes for "illicit relations". The amount of the bail was 200 million tomans, or about 60,000 USD.

== Life in exile ==
Since leaving Iran, Mousavi has continued his literary activities, participating in international poetry festivals and publishing his works online. He has become an outspoken advocate for freedom of expression and the rights of persecuted writers.

On 10 June 2026, Sic Publishing announced that Mousavi had filed a complaint regarding what it described as a "harassment and smear campaign", stating that the attacks were "part of a coordinated and well-resourced campaign designed to discredit, isolate, and limit Mehdi Mousavi's participation in public life". The publisher also reported that the Norwegian Police Security Service (PST) had opened a special case related to the matter. Hours later, Mousavi confirmed the report by publishing photographs of his own complaints filed against the harassment campaign. Two weeks later, Fatemeh Ekhtesari similarly published photographs of complaints filed by herself and several other writers who had been targeted, announcing that she had also reported the campaign to the police after experiencing serious concerns for her safety.

== Legacy ==
Mousavi's influence on Persian poetry is profound, with many young poets adopting the postmodern ghazal style. His works have been translated into multiple languages, and his lyrics have been performed by renowned Iranian musicians such as Shahin Najafi.

== Work ==
Several of his poems were banned in Iran due to their critical nature, forcing them to circulate underground. The authorities refused publication of two of his collections, "Suddenly" and "Beeping for the Sheep". Some of Mousavi's lyrics have been performed by Shahin Najafi, an Iranian singer in exile.

== Contribution to literature ==
Mousavi is best known as the founder of the "Postmodern Ghazal," a literary movement that challenged traditional Persian poetic forms by introducing modern themes, irony, and free expression. His works often critique societal norms and address taboo subjects, such as love, identity, and social justice.

=== Poetry Collections ===
- I Am Full of Stars, But…, Shahriar Publishing, 1997 (with two other poets) — Persian
- The Angels Have Committed Suicide, 2002 — Persian
- I Publish These Only Because of You, Sokhan Gostar Publishing, 2005 — Persian
- Little Bird, Neither a Bird Nor Little!, Sokhan Gostar Publishing, 2010 — Persian
- Even the House Number, Fasl-e Panjom Publishing, 2012 — Persian
- The Man Who Hasn’t Left Returns, Shemshad Publishing, 2012 (with photographs by Mohammad Sadegh Yarhamidi) — Persian
- It's Food is Eggplant, Paris: Nakoja Publishing, 2013 — Persian
- Drowning in an Aquarium, Nimaj Publishing, 2013 — Persian
- With the Mice, Nimaj Publishing, 2013 — Persian
- After the Rain, Before Exile, Nasira Publishing, 2014 — Persian
- The Extinction of the Iranian Leopard Due to the Excessive Increase of Sheep, Nimaj Publishing, 2014 — Persian
- Goofing around in Front of the Firing Squad, Amazon Publishing, 2018 — Persian
- In the Samurai way, Lulu Publishing, 2019 — Persian
- The Blood-soaked Liberty Square, Tel Aviv: Ktav Academic Publishing, 2021 — Hebrew / Persian
- In Praise of Disappointment, Lulu Publishing, 2023 — Persian
- The Last Kiss, Norway: SIC Publishing, 2026 — English / Persian

=== Fiction ===
- Eight Stories, Sayeh-ha Publishing, 2018 — Persian
- Conversation in Tehran, Amazon Publishing, 2017 — Persian
- One Thousand and Some Nights, Lulu Publishing, 2021 — Persian

=== Theory / Criticism ===
- Introductory Prosody in Simple Language, Electronic edition, 2011 — Persian

=== Anthologies ===
- Å kysse en ørken, å kysse en myr (Kissing a Desert, Kissing a Swamp), Aschehoug Publishing, 2019 (with several other poets) — Norwegian
- Disturbing Private Minds, Sayeh-ha Publishing, 2019 (with several other writers) — Persian
- Kontinentaldrift: Das Persische Europa (Continental Drift: Persian Europe), Wunderhorn Publishing, 2020 (with several other poets) — German / Persian
- The Multilingual Mosaic, Sayeh-ha Publishing, 2024 — Multilingual

== See also ==
- Fatemeh Ekhtesari
- Postmodern Ghazal
