= Jihad Al Turbaani =

Palestinian author and poet

Jihad Al-Turbani
- Born: Palestine
- Occupations: Writer, poet

Jihad Al-Turbani (Arabic: جهاد الترباني) is a Palestinian author, poet, and historical researcher interested in Islamic history. He gained fame for his pro-opposition poetry during the Syrian Civil War against Bashar Al-Assad and the Egyptian revolution against Hosni Mubarak. His poems have been sung by various artists, including Fadel Chaker, Naif al-Sharhaan, and the 'Strangers for Islamic Art' team.

He is the author of several books such as 100 Great People of Islam Who Changed The Course of History,Barbarossa's Mystery 101, Arius' Secrets 101 and Muhammad (SAW)'s Schoolbook

One of his famous poems is "We are heroes, we don't bow our heads," sung by the 'Strangers for Islamic art' team. He also wrote "Advance!" which praises the Syrian opposition. Additionally, he took part in the Sawaed Al Ekhaa program.

== Works ==
=== Books ===
- 100 Great People of Islam That Changed The Course of History
- Barbarossa's Mystery 101
- Secrets of Arius 101
- The Fandal's War 101
- Schoolbook of Muhammad (SAW) (History of Muhammad SAW in one book)
- The School of the Companions (of Muhammad SAW)

=== Poems ===
Notable poems by Al Turbaani include

- "We have not faltered" (ما وهانا)
- "We are the heroes" (ننا الابطال)

== See also ==
- Raghib Al Sarjani
