= Postmodern Ghazal =

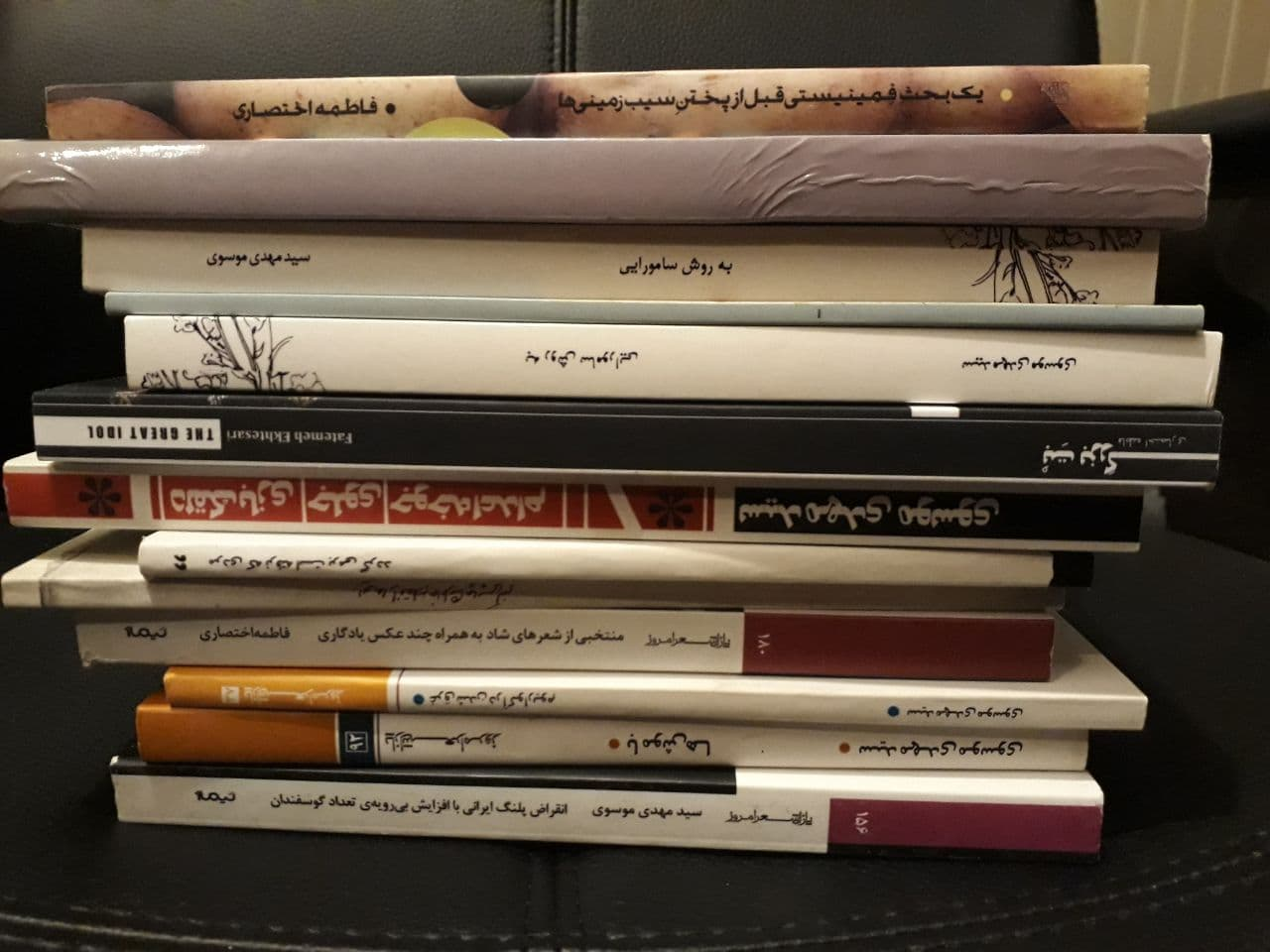
- Collections of Postmodern Ghazals
- Years active: Since the mid-1990s
- Location: Iran, Afghanistan, Tajikistan
- Major figures: Mehdi Mousavi, Fatemeh Ekhtesari, Elham Mizban, Mohammad Hosseini Moghadam, Andisheh Fooladvand, Mona Zendehdel, Hoda Ghoreishi, Tahereh Kupali, Vahid Najafi, Amir Sanjari, Alireza Nasimi, Ashraf Gilani
- Influences: Reza Baraheni, the Persian Language Poetry movement
- Influenced: Progressive songwriting

The Postmodern Ghazal, also referred to as "Postmodern", is a literary movement in Persian poetry that emerged during the 1990s in Iran (1370s in the Iranian calendars). It blends postmodernism with traditional Persian poetic forms such as ghazal, mathnawi, and rubaiyat.

== History ==
The Postmodern Ghazal originated during the 1990s in Iran, heavily influenced by Reza Baraheni. The expansion of the internet allowed poets to spread their works widely, despite restrictions by the Ministry of Culture and Islamic Guidance of Iran.

== Characteristics ==
Postmodern Ghazals retain traditional Persian poetic forms while incorporating modern themes. Key features include:

- Defamiliarization and oxymoronic pictures.
- Juxtaposition of lofty imagery
- De-contextualizing from popular cultures
