= Mojtaba Saminejad =

Iranian blogger and writer (born 1980)

- مجتبی سمیع‌نژاد
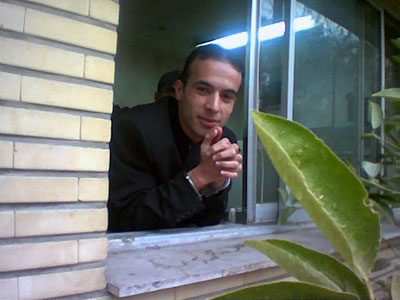
- Mojtaba Saminejad at Azad University, in handcuffs, to sit his exams (January 2006)
- Born: September 30, 1980 (age 45); Tehran, Iran
- Other names: Madyar
- Occupations: Web blogger, publisher, writer
- Website: http://www.madyariran.net/

Mojtaba (Madyar) Saminejad (Persian: مجتبی سمیع نژاد, born 30 September 1980 in Tehran) is an Iranian blogger and writer. He studied journalism at the Central Tehran Branch of Islamic Azad University.

He is the president of Shahr-e Khorshid publications (Persian: انتشارات شهر خورشید) and editor of Ferdowsi magazine.

== Activities ==
As a student, Saminejad was a writer and blogger. In 2004 Reporters Without Borders listed his as one of the Best blogs defending freedom of expression.

Saminejad's initial arrest on November 1, 2004, followed the publication on his blog of the arrests of three other bloggers. He was released on bail on January 27, 2005, relaunched his blog at a new address. It was promptly re-arrested on February 12, 2005. His bail was doubled to $125,000, which he could not pay.

He was charged with "insulting the prophets" (punishable by the death penalty under Article 512 of the Iranian Islamic penal code), "endangering national security", and "insulting the Supreme Leader" (the head of state of Iran).

On June 2, 2005, he was found guilty of "insulting the Supreme Leader", and sentenced to two years imprisonment by Judge Saadat of Revolutionary Court 13. On June 28, 2005, he was found not guilty of "insulting the prophets". One month later he was sentenced to an extra ten months in prison for incitement to "immorality".

During his arrest, Saminejad was allegedly held in solitary confinement for 88 days and subjected to beatings and torture.

He was taken in handcuffs to sit his exams at Tehran's Azad University on 21 January 2006.

After 21 months, on September 13, 2006 he was released from prison and started blogging again. He also works with an Iranian human-rights group, Human Rights Activists in Iran, which gathers information about how Iranians are repressed.

In 2009 he signed an open letter of apology posted to Iranian.com along with 266 other Iranian academics, writers, artists, journalists about the Iranian persecution of Baháʼís.

== Works ==
- Fiction
  - 2004 Ambiguous People (Persian: آدم های مبهم), a short surreal story in Persian.

== Awards and honors ==
- 2004 – Best blogs defending freedom of expression (Reporters Without Borders)

== See also ==
- Iranian blogs
- Human rights in Islamic Republic of Iran
