= Al-Musharaka =

Al-Musharaka emblem

Al-Musharaka (Arabic: المشاركة) (in English: participation and collaboration) is a National Institute for Technology in Liberal Education (NITLE) program initiative, intended to expand and enhance the teaching and study of Arab studies, Islamic studies and Middle Eastern studies.

== Background ==
The Al-Musharaka initiative began in November 2001 under the leadership of Clara Yu, then director of the institute, and its first major project was NITLE's online resource on Arab Culture and Civilization. An inter-institutional collaborative was launched at the same time which has fostered the development of an inter-institutional course on Islam and the development of online resources. It has also organized a large number of professional development activities, first at the Center for Educational Technology in Middlebury, Vermont (now the Northeastern Center of NITLE). The 2006 summer seminar was held at Macalester College, and all subsequent seminars will be held at other NITLE affiliated colleges. The Oldenborg Center at Pomona College will host the 2007 seminar, which will deal with Teaching about Islam.

Al-Musharaka is the Arabic word for "collaborative" or "collaboration". The Al-Musharaka logo was designed by Khaled Al Saa’i, one of the most prominent contemporary calligraphers in the Arab world. The Al-Musharaka Blog contains news about the collaborative and its activities, related news from NITLE colleges, news on issues such as media and education in the Muslim world, issues of academic freedom, etc.

Recent articles on Al-Musharaka appeared in the Educause Quarterly and the Middle East Studies Bulletin.
