= Hossein Derakhshan =

Iranian-Canadian blogger

- حسين درخشان
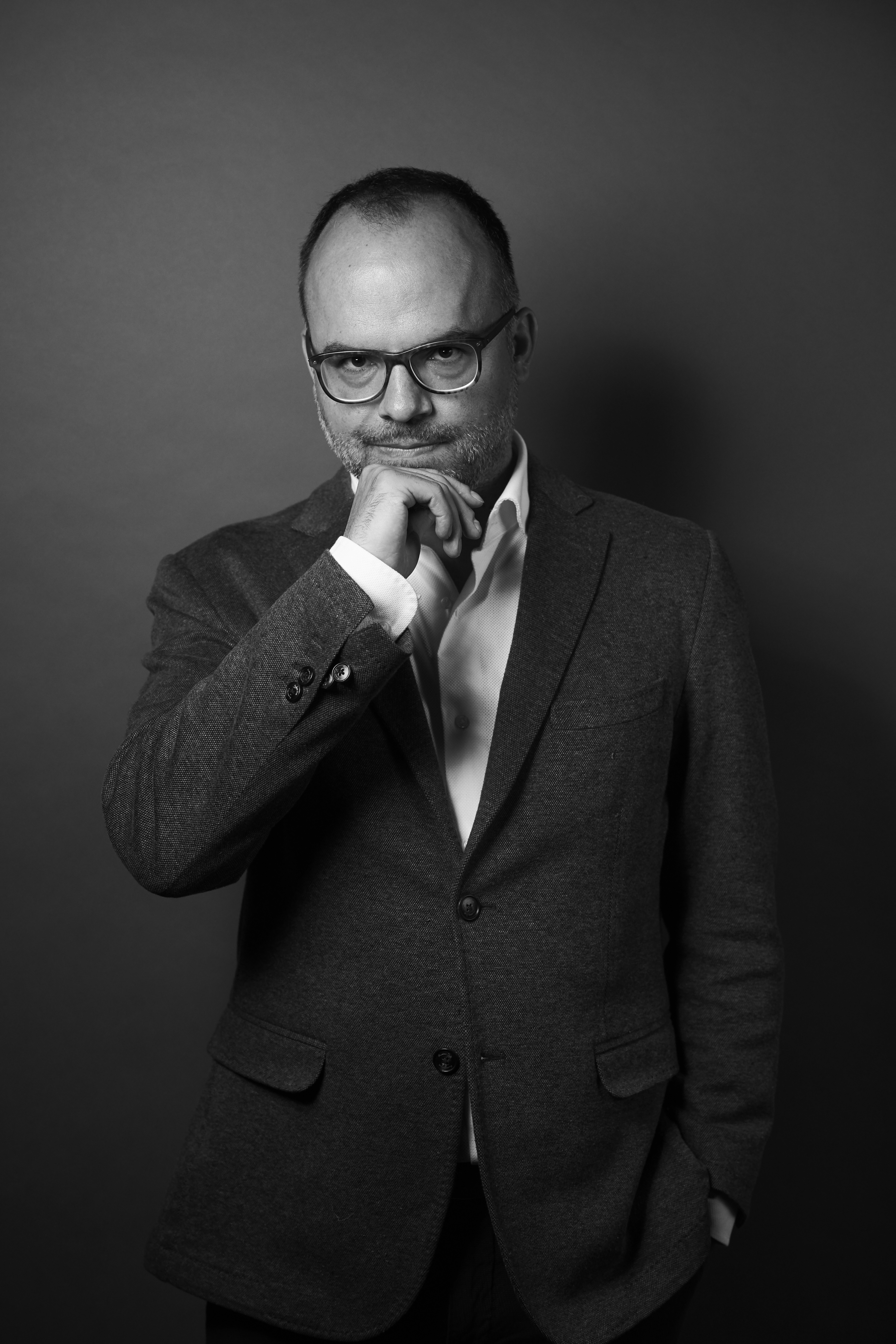
- Derakhshan in 2019
- Born: January 7, 1975 (age 51); Tehran, Iran
- Occupations: Journalist, Media researcher
- Known for: The Father of blogging in Iran
- Criminal charge: Multiple
- Criminal penalty: 19½ years in prison
- Criminal status: Pardoned
- Website: hoder.com/en/

Hossein Derakhshan (Persian: حسين درخشان; born January 7, 1975), also known as Hoder, is an Iranian-Canadian blogger, journalist, and researcher who was imprisoned in Tehran from November 2008 to November 2014. He is credited with starting the blogging revolution in Iran and is called the father of Persian blogging by many journalists. He also helped to promote podcasting in Iran. Derakhshan was arrested on November 1, 2008 and sentenced to 19½ years in prison on September 28, 2010. His sentence was reduced to 17 years in October 2013. He was pardoned by Iran's supreme leader and on November 19, 2014, was released from Evin prison.

== Education ==
Derakhshan started his education in Nikan High School in Tehran. He has a bachelor's degree in sociology from Shahid Beheshti University in Tehran. He spent time studying sociology at the University of Toronto. He holds a master's degree (MA) in Film and Media Studies from SOAS, University of London, 2008.

== Early journalism ==
Derakhshan started out as a journalist writing about Internet and digital culture for reformist newspaper, Asr-e Azadegan in 1999. Later, when this paper was closed down by the judiciary system, he moved to another newspaper, Hayat-e No. His column there was called Panjere-i roo be hayaat (A Window to the Life, a reference to Alfred Hitchcock's Rear Window), and later expanded to a weekly page on digital culture, Internet and computer games.

== Blogging advocacy ==
In December 2000, Derakhshan moved to Toronto, Ontario, Canada. On September 25, 2001, he started his weblog in the Persian language. It was titled Sardabir: khodam, or "Editor: Myself".

He later moved his manually maintained weblog to Blogger.com, which was not supporting Unicode at the time. He also prepared a step-by-step guide in Persian on how other Persian writers can start their weblogs using Blogger.com and the Unicode standard.

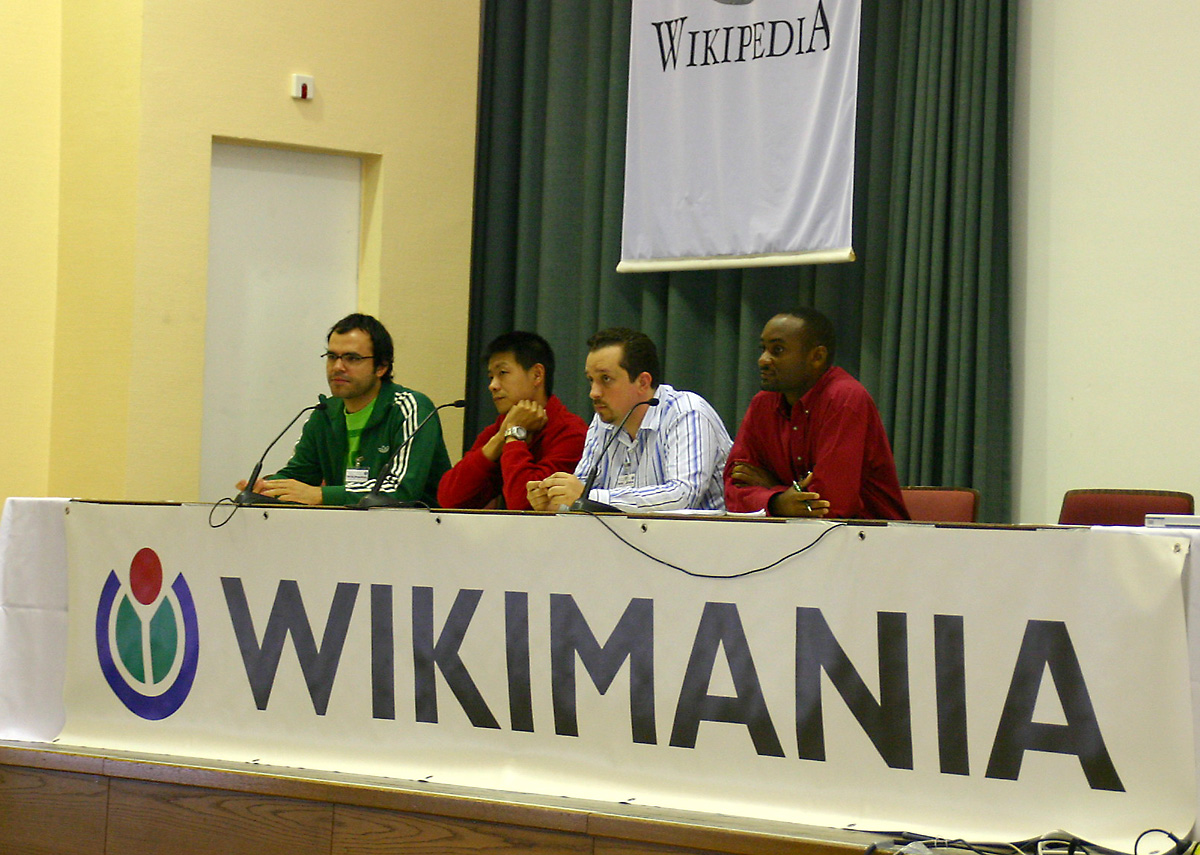
Global Voices Panel of Wikimania at the 2005 conference.

Derakhshan spoke at the Wikimania 2005 conference in Frankfurt, Germany regarding the complementary use of wikis and blogs to aid political reform and the growth of democracy in Iran and other countries.

On leaving Iran, he was briefly detained and summoned to the Ministry of Intelligence. A few days later he was interrogated by an intelligence official over the content of his blog and was forced to sign an apology before being allowed to leave Iran. But after leaving Iran, he published a report on what happened on his website.

== Activism ==
=== Anti-censorship ===
Derakhshan's weblog, like some other political Persian blogs and websites, has been blocked (or filtered) by the government in Iran, since 2004.

In December 2003, he founded Stop censoring us, a blog to watch the situation of internet censorship in Iran. He appeared a few times on a VOA Persian TV show to talk about Internet censorship and methods to get around filters.

=== Against Israel-Iran escalation ===
Derakhshan visited Israel as a Canadian citizen in early 2006 and early 2007. Before his first visit, he stated that he went to Israel as a personal attempt to start a dialogue between Iranian and Israeli people.

This might mean that I won't be able to go back to Iran for a long time, since Iran doesn't recognize Israel, has no diplomatic relations with it, and apparently considers traveling there illegal. Too bad, but I don't care. Fortunately, I'm a citizen of Canada and I have the right to visit any country I want.

I'm going to Israel as a citizen journalist and a peace activist. As a citizen journalist, I'm going to show my 20,000 daily Iranian readers what Israel really looks like and how people live there. The Islamic Republic has long portrayed Israel as an evil state, with a consensual political agenda of killing every single man and woman who prays to Allah, including Iranians. I'm going to challenge that image.

As a peace activist, I'm going to show the Israelis that the vast majority of Iranians do not identify with Ahmadinejad's rhetoric, despite what it looks like from the outside. I'm going to tell them how any kind of violent action against Iran would only harm the young people who are gradually reforming the system and how the radicals would benefit from such situation.

His second visit was to participate in a conference at The Chaim Herzog Center for Middle East Studies and Diplomacy at Ben-Gurion University in Beer Sheva. The annual international conference in 2007 was titled 'Reform, Resistance, and Conflicts in the Middle East." Hossein participated in panel titled 'Weblogging as a Space of Resistance', where he spoke about Iranian weblogs in a presentation titled as 'Internet in Iran: Are Weblogs and other forms of new media helping democracy in Iran?'.

His visits were widely covered by the local and international media, including Haaretz, Jerusalem Post, Ynet News, Ha'ir, Time Out Tel Aviv, Israeli Radio and its Persian service, Israel's English TV news, New York Times, BBC, etc.:

- Loving Tehran in Tel Aviv (Video) (January 2007). Israel's Channel Two.
- Iran-Israel Interface (January 2007). Jerusalem Post.
- King of the Iranian bloggers (January 2007). Haaretz
- חסיין דרחשאן, הבלוגר הכי חם בטהראן, בא לביקור בבאר שבע (January 2007). Haaretz
- I'll blog your house down (January 2006). Haaretz
- Web relations: Iranian blogs his way to Israel (January 2006). Jerusalem Post
- ראיון עם בלוגר איראני. (January 2006) YNet News
- Linking Tehran and Tel Aviv (May 2006). BBC News

== Views ==
=== Iran's nuclear program ===
In August 2006, he published an article in the Columns & Blogs section of The Washington Post in which he supported Iran pursuing nuclear weapons as a deterrent to possible invasion by global powers, after normalising relations with the U.S. and Israel: However, later after his prison sentence he supported Iran's nuclear deal with the six world powers.

=== Defending Iran against U.S. attack ===
Derakhshan wrote in his blog in December 2006: "If the US attacked Iran, despite all my problems with the Islamic Republic, I'd go back and fight these bastards. ... I can't let myself sit down for a moment and watch them make a Baghdad out of Tehran." He later published a commentary on The Guardian, titled "Stop Bullying Iran", in which he elaborated on his short blog post on why he defends Iran.

== Khalaji vs. Derakhshan defamation lawsuit ==
In November 2007, Mehdi Khalaji, a fellow at a hawkish think-tank called Washington Institute for Near East Policy (WINEP), filed a $2 million libel and defamation lawsuit against Derakhshan, over one of his blog posts in his Persian blog, in which he criticizes Khalaji for his service to the "enemies of his people and humanity", referring to the American hawkish policy makers on its board who were close to the George W. Bush administration and were closely involved in his interventionist middle east policy, including the occupation of Iraq, such as Richard Perle, Condoleezza Rice and James Woolsey. The case was dropped after Derakhshan's imprisonment in Iran.

Earlier in August 2007, Derakhshan's Florida-based hosting company, Hosting Matters, had terminated his hosting account as a result of alleged 'intimidation' by Khalaji.

== Arrest and imprisonment (2008–2014) ==
On November 1, 2008, Derakhshan was arrested at his family home in Tehran. During November, he was allowed four calls to his family, each lasting about one minute.

On November 18, the anti-censorship group Global Voices Online published an article about Derakhshan's arrest. A few days later, the Times of London published a report saying Derakhshan had been arrested for spying on behalf of Israel. Amnesty International later suggested that he was likely to face accusations of "insulting religion."

On December 30, Alireza Jamshidi, the speaker of the Judicial system of Iran confirmed Derakhshan's arrest, but did not mention any Israel-related accusations. Jamshidi said that Derakhshan was in the custody of the Islamic Revolutionary Court and his case was in early discovery phase, and that among Derakhshan's accusations is what he had written about the "Pure Imams".

Nineteen Iranian bloggers published a letter "categorically condemn[ing] the circumstances surrounding Derakhshan's arrest and detention and demand[ing] his immediate release". A website "Free the blogfather" was created by supporters of Derakhshan in order to campaign for his freedom. Before an earlier return to Iran in 2005, Derakhshan had published recommendations of what to do if he or someone else were arrested in Iran, including requests to "spread the word", to "get the English-language media involved" and to "get the publicity translated [into Persian]" and "keep it up".

In April 2009, The New York Times reported that Derakhshan was still detained without charges.

In October 2009, approaching the one-year anniversary of his arrest, his family began speaking out to Persian and English-language media, and Derakhshan's father Hassan sent an open letter to the new head of the Iranian Judiciary, Ayatollah Sadeq Larijani asking for information about his son's detention.

On October 29, 2009, according to Derakhshan's brother Hamed, Derakhshan's parents met with the new district attorney, who allowed them to have dinner in Evin Prison with their son. The brother also said that at the dinner, Hossein confirmed human rights activists' reports claiming Derakhshan had been subject to physical and psychological pressures such as being forced to do squats in cold showers, receiving repeated beatings, being subject to solitary confinedment, beatings, threats to arrest family members, and false promises of his release, in an effort to secure a confession to espionage charges.

Derakhshan's father, Hassan, also wrote a public letter to the head of the judiciary asking for Derakhshan's release.

=== Trial in 2010 and further developments ===
In March 2010, Derakhshan's mother, Ozra Kiarashpour, called on the head of Iran's judiciary to release her son, who had at that point been detained for 500 days without any official charge, for the Iranian New Year, or Norouz.

In June 2010, Tehran Revolutionary Court held Derakhshan's first trial. His sister Azadeh reported that the trial ended in late July, but no word on a verdict was available.

On September 28, Derakhshan was sentenced to 19 1/2 years in prison. According to state-owned Mashregh News, which is close to Iran's presidential office, Derakhshan was convicted on charges of cooperation with hostile countries (a reference to the Israel visit), spreading propaganda against the ruling establishment, promotion of counterrevolutionary groups and insulting Islamic thought and religious figures.

On December 9, Derakhshan was released for two days on a bail of $1.5m (£950,000)

On May 6, 2011, Derakhshan updated his Facebook profile and photos, and added a one line status update of "On a very short leave from Evin".

In June 2011, Derakhshan's family said that the Iranian appeals court has upheld his conviction.

In October 2013, Derakhshan's sentence was reduced from 19.5 years to 17 years, as a result of the Supreme Leader's pardoning for Eid al-Fitr.

=== November 2014 release ===
Derakhshan was pardoned by the Supreme Leader of Iran Ali Khamenei in 2014 and freed from prison on November 19, 2014.

== Post-prison activities ==
After his release, Derakhshan wrote an essay for Matter on how the internet had changed in his absence, titled "The Web We Have to Save" (2015). It was widely translated and published in various languages. The essay was the basis for a short video documentary he produced for Mozilla Foundation.

He has continued writing and speaking about socio-political implications of social media and the future of journalism. He received a research fellowship at Harvard Kennedy School's Shorenstein Center in Spring 2018. The invitation caused a controversy and a number of prominent Iranian journalists including Roya Hakakian and Maziar Bahari accused Derakhashan of framing Iranian scholars Ramin Jahanbegloo and Hale Sfandiari.

He has co-authored a report on "fake news" and disinformation with Claire Wardle, titled "Information Disorder" (2017) which was commissioned by Council of Europe, in which he notably coined the term "malinformation". He has also co-authored a few opinion pieces about information disorder with Wardle.

In 2018, Derakhshan restarted writing and commenting on Iran.

In the 2021 Iranian presidential election, Derakhshan advocated participation in the election. The election broke records of the lowest turnout in Iranian electoral history and concluded with the victory of Ebrahim Raisi. Hemmati ended up in the third place (fourth considering invalid ballots).

== See also ==
- List of foreign nationals detained in Iran
