= Fateme Ekhtesari =

Iranian poet (born 1986)

- فاطمه اختصاری
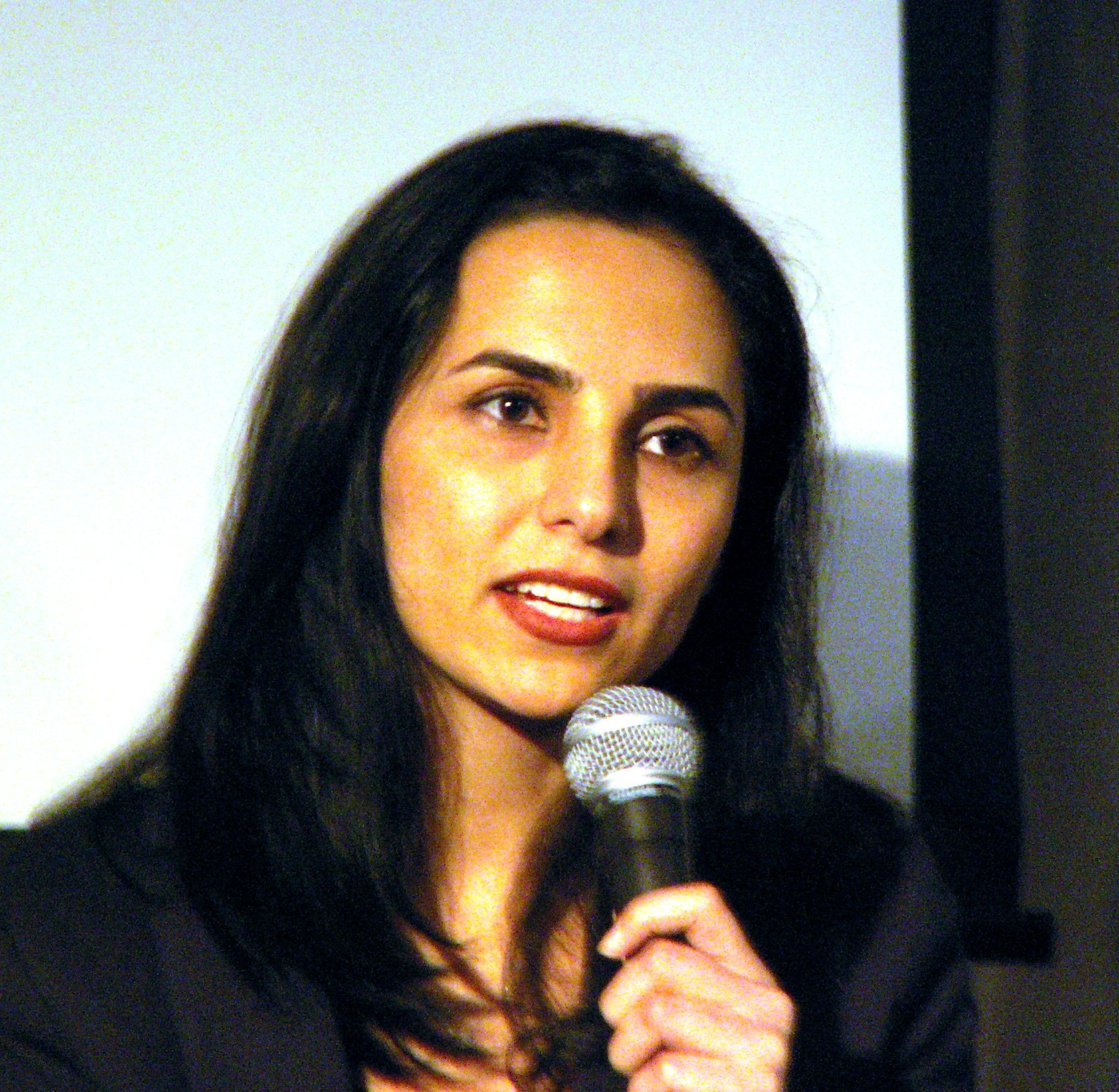
- Ekhtesari in 2018
- Born: Fateme Ekhtesari; 1986 (age 39–40); Kashmar, Iran
- Education: Midwifery
- Occupations: Poet; songwriter; criticism; writer
- Writing career
- Language: Persian
- Genre: Postmodern Ghazal
- Website: www.ekhtesari.com

Fateme Ekhtesari, also Fatemeh Ekhtesari (Persian: فاطمه اختصاری; born 1986) is an Iranian poet and writer. Ekhtesari lived in Karaj and she writes in Persian. In 2013, she appeared at the poetry festival in Gothenburg, Göteborgs poesifestival. After she arrived back in Iran she was imprisoned and later released on bail. Her verdict came in 2015 when she was sentenced to 99 lashes and 11.5 years imprisonment for crimes against the Iranian government, for immoral behaviour and blasphemy.

== Early life and education ==
Fatemeh Ekhtesari was born in Iran and initially trained as a midwife, a profession that influences much of her literary work. She frequently writes about labour, pregnancy, and abortion, reflecting on the intersection of gender, bodily autonomy, and societal expectations in Iran.

== Literary career in Iran ==
Ekhtesari is known for her work in postmodern ghazal poetry, which modernises traditional Persian verse with fragmented structures and contemporary themes. Her poetry challenges gender norms, censorship, and political oppression, and she has been recognised as a leading feminist voice in contemporary Iranian literature.

Her first collection of poems, A Feminist Discourse Before Cooking Potatoes, was published in 2010 and is recognised for its "exploration of feminist themes, challenging traditional gender roles, and critiquing societal norms in Iran". However, the book was later retracted, and its publication was halted when it was discovered that she had filled in censored words by hand before its release.

Her second book, Rakhs roye sime khardar, was still awaiting approval for publication by the Iranian government as of October 2015.

She was also the chief editor of the postmodern literary magazine It Was Just Tomorrow (همین فردا بود, Hamin Farad Bud), which was later cancelled by Iranian authorities.

Ekhtesari also participated in a literary project called En motståndsrörelse på mitt skrivbord (A resistance movement on my desk), where six Persian and six Swedish poets collaborated. This was documented by the Swedish literary magazine Kritiker in 2013.

The Iranian rapper Shahin Najafi, whose music has been banned in Iran, has used some of Ekhtesari's poems in his songs.

== Censorship and persecution in Iran ==
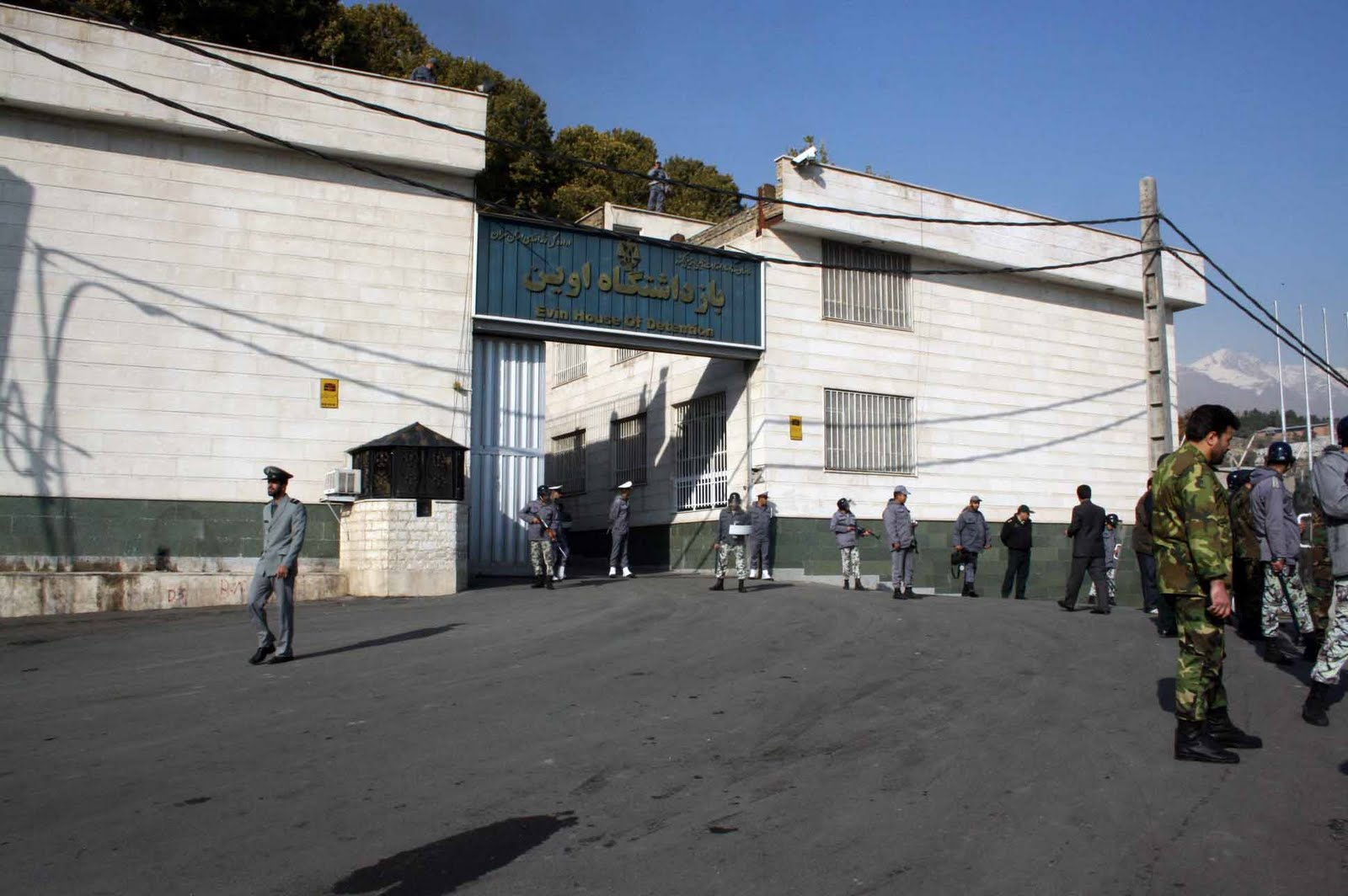
Evin prison

In 2013, Ekhtesari was invited to participate in the Gothenburg Poetry Festival in Sweden. However, upon her return to Iran, she was arrested at the airport while attempting to travel to Turkey with fellow poet Mehdi Moosavi. She was subsequently imprisoned at Evin Prison in Tehran. During her imprisonment, her Facebook account was hacked, and her blog was shut down.

On 12 October 2015, she was sentenced to 99 lashes and 11.5 years in prison on multiple charges, including seven years for "insulting the sacred", three years for allegedly publishing "indecent photos online", 18 months for spreading "propaganda critical of the Iranian government", and 99 lashes for "illicit relations"

In response to Ekhtesari's sentencing, more than 100 poets, including Robert Pinsky, Claudia Rankine, Billy Collins, John Ashbery, and Tracy K. Smith, signed an open letter urging Iranian authorities to overturn the conviction. The letter was part of a broader international effort to advocate for the release of persecuted poets in Iran.

PEN International playing a key role in campaigning for her freedom. In 2015, PEN International publicly condemned her sentencing and called for her release, highlighting her case as an example of severe literary censorship in Iran.

In January 2016, she fled Iran to escape her sentence, though she declined to disclose further details about her escape.

== Exile in Norway ==
She sought asylum in Norway, where she has continued her literary career in exile. Upon her arrival in Norway, Ekhtesari became an ICORN writer under the International Cities of Refuge Network (ICORN), which provides safe residency for persecuted writers. She is also a member of PEN Norway and has continued to advocate for freedom of expression through her work with international literary organisations.

While in Norway, Ekhtesari has become an active figure in the country's literary circles. She has participated in major literary festivals, collaborated with Norwegian publishers, and published poetry collections in bilingual editions. Her works have been translated into Norwegian and English, broadening her international audience. The themes of exile, censorship, and displacement have become increasingly central to her poetry, reflecting her personal experiences and the struggles of persecuted Iranian artists.

Ekhtesari has also engaged with Norwegian schools through Den kulturelle skolesekken, a cultural outreach program that introduces students to diverse literary traditions and global human rights issues.

== Advocacy for human rights ==
Ekhtesari has been an outspoken advocate for freedom of expression and the protection of writers and artists facing persecution. She has used her platform to raise awareness about the repression of Iranian poets and has spoken at international forums on human rights.

- United Nations Human Rights Council – 56th Session (2024) – Ekhtesari spoke at a panel discussion titled Based on a True Story during the **56th session of the UN Human Rights Council** in Geneva. The event, organised by **PEN America, PEN International**, and the **Permanent Missions of Poland and Estonia to the UN**, focused on the protection of writers at risk. Ekhtesari addressed the challenges faced by Iranian artists and activists and advocated for stronger international policies to defend freedom of expression in Iran.
- PEN America and PEN International – She has collaborated with **PEN America** and **PEN International**, two organisations that support freedom of expression for writers worldwide. Through these platforms, she has highlighted the dangers faced by Iranian poets and has called for greater international solidarity in defending artistic freedom.
- Advocacy for Iranian Artists in Exile – Ekhtesari continues to advocate for exiled Iranian artists, using her poetry and public appearances to shed light on censorship, imprisonment, and the challenges of exile.

== Literary and cultural engagements ==
Ekhtesari has been an active participant in international literary festivals and cultural events, where she has shared her experiences as an exiled writer and discussed issues of censorship, gender, and freedom of speech in Iran.

- International Literature Festival Berlin (ILB) – She participated in the festival, where she shared her work and discussed themes of human rights and exile.
- Norwegian Festival of Literature – Ekhtesari has been featured at the Norwegian Literature Festival in Lillehammer, the largest literary festival in the Nordic region.
- Bergen International Literary Festival – She was listed among the featured authors for the 2024 festival, marking her growing influence in Norway's literary scene.
- Nobel Peace Prize Centre – Ekhtesari has spoken at events at the Nobel Peace Prize Centre, discussing the importance of literary activism and human rights.
- Poetry Night at the 24th International Literature Festival Berlin – Ekhtesari performed at a special poetry night during the festival.
- Den kulturelle skolesekken (Cultural outreach in schools) – As part of Norway's cultural school program, Ekhtesari has conducted workshops and lectures in schools, introducing students to poetry and themes of exile, literature, and resistance.
- In 2026, Ekhtesari received the Solstice Literary Award in the Czech Republic. During the award ceremony, the festival's president, Václav Müller, stated: "Fatemeh has shown a level of courage that I, and most of us, can hardly imagine. Because of her commitment to artistic freedom of expression, she was sentenced in her home country to 99 lashes and many years of imprisonment. This may seem almost unbelievable to us today, but it is a reality that still exists in the world." As the fourth—and youngest—recipient of the award, Ekhtesari received the prize from Czech writer Karin Lednická.

== Bibliography ==
=== Poetry collections ===
- A Feminist Discourse Before Cooking Potatoes (یک بحث فمینیستی قبل از پختن سیب‌زمینی‌ها) (2010)
- Beside the Tracks (کنار جاده‌ی فرعی) (2013)
- A Selection of Cheerful Poems with Some Memorable Pictures (منتخبی از شعرهای شاد به همراه چند عکس یادگاری) (2015)
- We Do Not Survive (Vi overlever ikke) (2020) – Bilingual Norwegian-Persian edition
- She Is Not a Woman (Hun er ikke kvinne) (2022) – Bilingual Norwegian-Persian edition

=== Short story collections ===
- Swimming in the Acid Pool (شنا کردن در حوضچه‌ی اسید) (2017)
- Axe (تبر) (2018)

=== Multi-genre works (memoir and literary essays) ===
- The Dead Who Took a Deep Breath: 38 Days in Evin’s Solitary Confinement (مرده‌ای که مرده بود یک نفس عمیق کشید: ۳۸ روز انفرادی اوین) (2017) – Memoir
- Closeness (نزدیکی) (2020)

=== Anthology contributions ===
- To Kiss a Desert, To Kiss a Bog (Å kysse en ørken, å kysse en myr) (2019) – Includes selections of Ekhtesari's poetry in Norwegian translation
- The Mirror of My Heart – A Thousand Years of Persian Poetry by Women (2020) – Translated by Dick Davis, published by Penguin Classics
