= Sina Motalebi =

Iranian journalist, based in London (born 1973)

- Born: 21 April 1973 (age 52); Tehran, Iran
- Occupation: Journalist
- Employer: BBC Persian
- Spouse: Farnaz Ghazizadeh (m. 1999)

Sina Motalebi (Persian: سينا مطلبی; born 21 April 1973) is an Iranian journalist based in London. He was the Editor of ZigZag magazine, a website based on the content of journalists and citizen's contributions following their distance journalism training course provided by the BBC World Service Trust.

== Career ==
He started his career in 1991 as a film critic and later began to write political and cultural columns and commentary for several reformist newspapers. He joined the Persian Section of BBC World Service as a multimedia producer in 2004. He graduated from Tehran University, Faculty of Law and Political Science. After most of the Iranian reformist publications were banned by the government, Sina started blogging in his personal weblog, Webgard (also known as Rooznegar).

On 20 April 2003, he was arrested by the intelligence division of law enforcement because of his writings in his weblog and newspapers and his interviews with foreign media. He was detained for 23 days in solitary confinement in a secret detention center before he was released on bail.

In December 2003, Sina left the country for the Netherlands, where he sought asylum. He recalled his experiences in his weblog as well as a joint press conference held by Human Rights Watch and Reporters sans frontières (in June 2004).

The judiciary responded by arresting his father, Saeed Motalebi. It charged him with "assisting the escape of an accused person," an apparent reference to his son's departure from Iran, even though Sina Motalebi left Iran legally. Saeed Motalebi was detained for ten days in a secret detention center before being released. Pedram Moallemian, an Iranian blogger and activist, campaigned for his release during his detention.

== Awards and honors ==
- 1997 – The First Prize at the National Press Festival, Tehran
- 2005 – Hellman/Hammett Grant by Human Rights Watch

== Sources ==
- Sina Motalebi's father arrested – IFEX
