= Mehrnoush Najafi Ragheb =

Iranian lawyer (born 1979)

Mehrnoush Najafi Ragheb (Persian: مهرنوش نجفی راغب; born 1979 in Hamedan) is an Iranian lawyer, and former member of the Hamedan City Council. She served as a member of the council from December 2006 to 2012. She holds a PhD in Law, with a specialization in transitional justice, the rule of law, and development in post-conflict or regime-transition contexts. She is a women’s rights activist, Persian blogger, human rights advocate, and supporter of legal reform.
