= National Institute for Technology in Liberal Education =

Education technology collaboration for liberal arts institutions

The NITLE logo

The National Institute for Technology in Liberal Education (NITLE) was a "community-based, non-profit initiative" to "help liberal arts colleges and universities integrate inquiry, pedagogy, and technology". It was established in September 2001.

Its stated mission was to catalyze "innovative teaching in order to enrich and advance liberal education in the digital age." The initiative provided programs and services that promote inter-institutional collaboration and innovative uses of technology at small, undergraduate-centered, residential colleges and universities.

== History ==
NITLE was established in September 2001, through a grant from The Andrew W. Mellon Foundation. The original charge of this grant-funded initiative was to stimulate collaboration between selected liberal arts colleges and to act as a catalyst for the effective integration of emerging and newer digital technologies into teaching, learning, scholarship, and information management at those colleges.

In January, 2006, NITLE reorganized under Ithaka, bringing together and merging with three other Mellon-funded instructional technology initiatives: the Center for Educational Technology at Middlebury College, the Associated Colleges of the South Technology Center, and the Midwest Instructional Technology Center (associated with the Great Lakes Colleges Association and the Associated Colleges of the Midwest). The reorganization merged NITLE and the three regional technology centers into a unified, national initiative for providing instructional technology programs for providers of liberal education in the United States. The reformed organization continued to receive grant support from The Andrew W. Mellon Foundation.

== Location ==
From 2009 to 2015 NITLE was hosted at Southwestern University , a small, private liberal arts college in Georgetown, Texas. Staff was distributed across several states. In 2015, NITLE migrated its operations to the Council on Library and Information Resources (CLIR), headquartered in Washington, D.C. The Institute closed in 2018.

== Core program areas ==
The organization delivered a methodology that provided colleges and institutions with the traction they needed to move forward to meet stated strategic collaboration objectives. The program engaged targeted groups of institutions that had already identified – or were actively in the process of identifying—shared needs and objectives, and complementary strengths. The methodology guided participants through the process of identifying how to maximize the benefits of partnerships by using collaborative processes and tools to achieve specifically defined common objectives.

== See also ==
- Al-Musharaka, an NITLE program to promote university Arab studies
