= Alireza Jamshidi =

Dr Alireza Jamshidi (or Ali-Reza Jamshidi) is an official spokesman for Iran's judiciary, headed by Mahmoud Shahroudi. In that capacity, he holds regular news conferences. As he has little other public presence, his name is associated mainly with stories he has promulgated:

- Imprisonment of members of the Baháʼí Faith because of their religion
- Prosecution of doctors carrying out HIV/AIDS treatment and prevention programs, apparently because of links with the United States
- Executions of juvenile offenders such as that of Mohammad Hassanzadeh for a crime committed at the age of fourteen years.
- Denial of punishments such as stoning, which he claimed were falsely attributed to Iran by Western media
- Capital punishment for "insulting religious sanctities and laws, and homosexuality."
