= Associated Colleges of the South =

Group of liberal arts colleges in the US

The Associated Colleges of the South (ACS) is a consortium of 15 liberal arts colleges in the Southern United States. It was formed in 1991. Its mission is to champion and enhance residential liberal arts education through collaborative projects among its member institutions.

== Activities ==
The Associated Colleges of the South seeks to enhance member excellence and reduce costs through collaboration. The consortium has primarily undertaken projects for the professional development of faculty. Collaborative efforts include: sharing of best practices; professional networking for faculty, staff and administrators through online communities and regular, in-person meetings; and joint-service activities such as shared legal counsel. ACS has been awarded several millions of dollars in private grants from various philanthropic foundations to be redistributed amongst member institutions on a competitive basis to support projects that require collaboration between and among members. A special focus has been collaborations that advance diversity and inclusion on member campuses, or that help faculty develop new skills and new pedagogical approaches, especially those that use the internet and computing. ACS also manages a tuition exchange program that allows the children of the faculty and staff at member institutions to attend other institutions within the consortium.

== Members ==
The following colleges are ASC colleges:

- Berea College-Berea, Kentucky
- Centenary College of Louisiana - Shreveport, Louisiana
- Centre College - Danville, Kentucky
- Davidson College - Davidson, North Carolina
- Furman University - Greenville, South Carolina
- Hendrix College - Conway, Arkansas
- Millsaps College - Jackson, Mississippi
- Morehouse College - Atlanta, Georgia
- Rhodes College - Memphis, Tennessee
- Rollins College - Winter Park, Florida
- Sewanee: The University of the South - Sewanee, Tennessee
- Southwestern University - Georgetown, Texas
- Spelman College - Atlanta, Georgia
- Trinity University - San Antonio, Texas
- University of Richmond - Richmond, Virginia
- Washington and Lee University - Lexington, Virginia

== Former members ==
- Birmingham–Southern College - Birmingham, Alabama (closed 2024)
