= Ragheb Sergani =

Egyptian surgeon and philosopher

- Born: 1964 (age 61–62); Gharbia Governorate, Egypt

Dr. Ragheb Hanafi Sergani (Arabic: راغب الحنفي راغب السرجاني) is an Egyptian professor of urology at Cairo University as a member of its Faculty of Medicine. Dr. Ragheb El-Sergany is famous for his academic interest in Islamic history and has authored books on the subject while currently overseeing the website "IslamStory.com". He was born in El Mahalla El Kubra in the Gharbia Governorate.

He has published a number of books on Islamic history, and has several lectures on the history of Islam published on social media. With over 240,000 followers on Twitter and approximately 260,000 followers on Facebook, he has gained a large following online and in the Islamic social sphere.

== Education ==
- Graduated with honors from the Faculty of Medicine at Cairo University in 1988
- Completed his memorization of the Quran in 1991
- Served as a visiting instructor at Tulane University in New Orleans, LA from 1994-1997
- Earned a master's degree with honors from Cairo University in 1998
- Received a doctorate in kidney and urinary tract surgery with joint supervision from the United States and Egypt in 1998
- Assistant professor at the Faculty of Medicine at Cairo University
- Member of the International Union of Muslim Scholars
- Member of the American Urological Association
- Member of the Egyptian Urological Association

== Books ==
- The Causes of the Ummah's Defeat
- Spiritual Reading
- The simplified encyclopedia of islamic history
