= Ghena =

Book by Seyyed Ali Khamenei

- Authors: Ali Khamenei
- Original title: Ghina' (غناء)
- Language: Persian
- Publication place: Iran
- Pages: 562

Ghena or Ghina, also known as The Book of Ghina and Moosiqi, is a Persian Feqhi book by Iran's former supreme leader, Seyyed Ali Khamenei. This religious book which is also known as "Darsnameh Ghina'-and-Moosiqi" (i.e. textbook of Qena and Music), includes the text of 76 sessions from the Fiqh sessions of haram (illegal) gains of Seyyed Ali Khamenei in regards to the subject of Ghina' and music.

== Meaning (of Ghena) ==
Ghena or Ghināʾ (in Arabic: الغناء), is attributed to the voice of a human being produced in an undulating pattern in order to create the effect of rapture which is appropriate for gatherings of merrymaking and sin. This is haram (forbidden Islamically) to engage in this kind of singing; in addition to listen to it.

== Publication ==
The Research-Cultural Institute of "Enghelab-e-Eslami" (the Islamic Revolution institute) relating to "the Office for the Preservation and Publication of the Works of Seyyed Ali Khamenei", has published the textbook of Ghena which is including 76 sessions (since 2008-2009). The goal of this publication is to perceive Seyyed-Ali Khamenei's viewpoint and his Feqhi manner on the mentioned subject -- of Ghina'. On the other hand, Arabic article of Khamenei in this field has been published by the institute (of Enghelab-e-Eslami) in the periodical of "Feqhe-Ahlulbayt".

== See also ==
- An Outline of Islamic Thought in the Quran
- Ruhe-Tawhid, Nafye Obudiate GheireKhoda
- A 250 Years Old Person
- Palestine (2011 book)
- Ali Khamenei bibliography
