= Political positions of Ali Khamenei =

Ali Khamenei, the second supreme leader of Iran, was known for holding conservative domestic political positions during his tenure, especially with regard to religious doctrine, though he advocated for economic privatisation and the advancement of science and technology. Khamenei has been colloquially referred to as Khameneism. In foreign policy, Khamenei advocated for the Arab Spring as a method to spread the Iranian Revolution, like his predecessor Ruhollah Khomeini was a staunch opponent of the United States and Israel, and denied the Holocaust.

== Domestic policy ==
Within Iran, Khamenei was the most powerful political authority. He was the de facto head of state of Iran, the commander-in-chief of its armed forces, and could issue decrees and make the final decisions on the main policies of the government in economy, the environment, foreign policy, and national planning in Iran. As supreme leader, Khamenei had either direct or indirect control over the executive, legislative, and judicial branches of government, as well as the military and media.

All candidates for the Assembly of Experts, the presidency and the Majlis (Parliament) were vetted by the Guardian Council, whose members are selected directly or indirectly by the supreme leader of Iran. There were also instances when the Guardian Council reversed its ban on particular people after being ordered to do so by Khamenei.

Some regarded Khamenei as the figurehead of the country's conservative establishment. Khamenei supported Mesbah Yazdi, describing him as one of Iran's most credible ideologues before the 2005 election but "recently been concerned about Mesbah's political ambitions".

In 2007, Khamenei requested that government officials speed up Iran's move towards economic privatisation. Its last move towards such a goal was in 2004, when Article 44 of the constitution was overturned. Article 44 had decreed that Iran's core infrastructure should remain state-run. Khamenei also suggested that ownership rights should be protected in courts set up by the Justice Ministry; the hope was that this new protection would give a measure of security to and encourage private investment.

In 2007, Iranian police under the direction of Khamenei launched a "Public Security Plan", arresting dozens of "thugs" to increase public security. Additionally, Khamenei stated that he believed in the importance of nuclear technology for civilian purposes because "oil and gas reserves cannot last forever".

On 30 April 2008, Ali Khamenei backed President Mahmoud Ahmadinejad's economic policy and said the West was struggling with more economic difficulties than Iran, with a "crisis" spreading from the United States to Europe, and inflation was a widespread problem. The Iranian leader said that the ongoing economic crisis, which has debilitated the world, has been unprecedented in the past 60 years. He said: "This crisis has forced the UN to declare state of emergency for food shortages around the globe but foreign radios have focused on Iran to imply that the current price hikes and inflation in the country are the results [sic] of carelessness on the part of Iranian officials which of course is not true." Khamenei emphasized that no one has the right to blame the Iranian government for Iran's economic problems. He also advised people and the government to be content and avoid waste to solve economic problems. He added: "I advise you to keep in your mind that this great nation is never afraid of economic sanctions."

=== Presidential, parliamentary, and Assembly of Experts elections ===
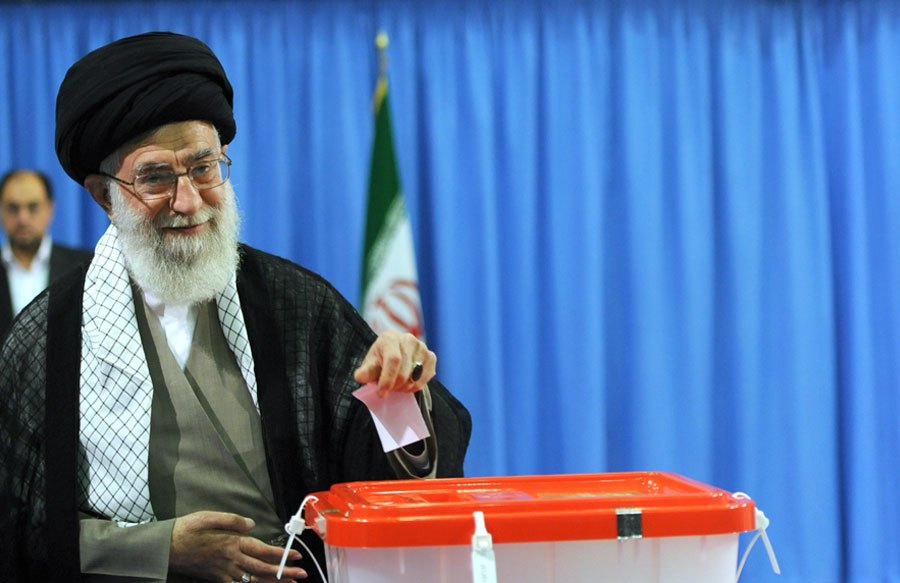
Khamenei casting his vote in the 2013 presidential election

As Supreme Leader, Khamenei had influence over elections in Iran, since the Constitution of Iran allowed him to appoint half of the members of the Guardian Council and the Chief Justice of Iran. The Constitution also establishes that the Council approves or disqualifies candidates for office. At the same time, the Chief Justice presents the other half of the members of the council to be selected by Parliament. These constitutional provisions give Khamenei direct and indirect influence over the council, an entity that has direct influence over who can run for government.

This influence was evident in the 2004 parliamentary elections, in which the Guardian Council disqualified thousands of candidates from running – including 80 incumbents, many of the reformist members of Parliament, and all the candidates of the Islamic Iran Participation Front party. Subsequently, the Conservatives won about 70% of parliamentary seats. The election became a key turning point in the country's political evolution as it marked the end of the campaign for political and social reform initiated by former President Mohammad Khatami.

During the 2005 presidential election, Khamenei's comments about the importance of fighting corruption, being faithful to the ideals of the Islamic revolution, as well as on the superior intelligence and dynamism of those who studied engineering, were interpreted by some as a subtle endorsement of Mahmoud Ahmadinejad, who had a PhD in traffic engineering. After the election, and until recently, Khamenei was outspoken in his support for Ahmadinejad, and "defended him publicly in ways which he never" had reformist president Khatami. Khamenei would later certify the results of the 2009 Iranian presidential election.

Khamenei took a firm stand against the 2009–2010 Iranian election protests, and stated that he would neither reconsider vote results nor bow to public pressure over the disputed reelection of President Mahmoud Ahmadinejad. He said: "By Allah's favor, the presidential election was accurately held, and the current matters should be pursued legally".

In a public appearance on 19 June, he expressed his support for the declared winner, Ahmadinejad. He accused foreign powers – including Britain, Israel, and the United States – of helping foment protests against the election results. In particular, he singled out Britain, perceiving the country as the "most evil" of its enemies. He said that the Iranian people would respond with an "iron fist" if Western powers meddle in Iran's internal affairs.

In response to reformist gains in the 2015–2016 election cycle, Khamenei lamented the loss of conservative clerics from the Assembly of Experts and suggested changes to the law by which the Guardian Council vets candidates may be needed because it is currently too difficult for the Guardian Council to vet so large a number of candidates.

=== Science and technology ===
Khamenei was supportive of scientific progress in Iran. He was among the first Islamic clerics to allow stem cell research and therapeutic cloning. In 2004, Khamenei said that the country's progress is dependent on investment in the field of science and technology. He also said that attaching a high status to scholars and scientists in society would help talents to flourish and science and technology to become domesticated, thus ensuring the country's progress and development.

In recent years, the growth in Iran's scientific output is reported to be the fastest in the world. Khamenei has often encouraged young scientists and top academic talents to push the boundaries of science and technology and has promoted policies aimed at raising Iran's scientific standing and strengthening cooperation between universities, industry, and Muslim nations.

Khamenei has also publicly acknowledged and praised Iranian women's roles in science, research, and intellectual life. He has said that Iranian women's achievements in intellectual and research centers are unprecedented in the country's history and that women are among the best globally in fields such as science and thought.

In 2015, Khamenei stated that all Afghan children in Iran, including undocumented immigrants, should have access to education, declaring that no Afghan child should be excluded from schooling regardless of legal status.

=== Nuclear weapons ===
Khamenei reportedly issued a fatwa saying the production, stockpiling, and use of nuclear weapons was forbidden under Islam.

== Foreign policy ==
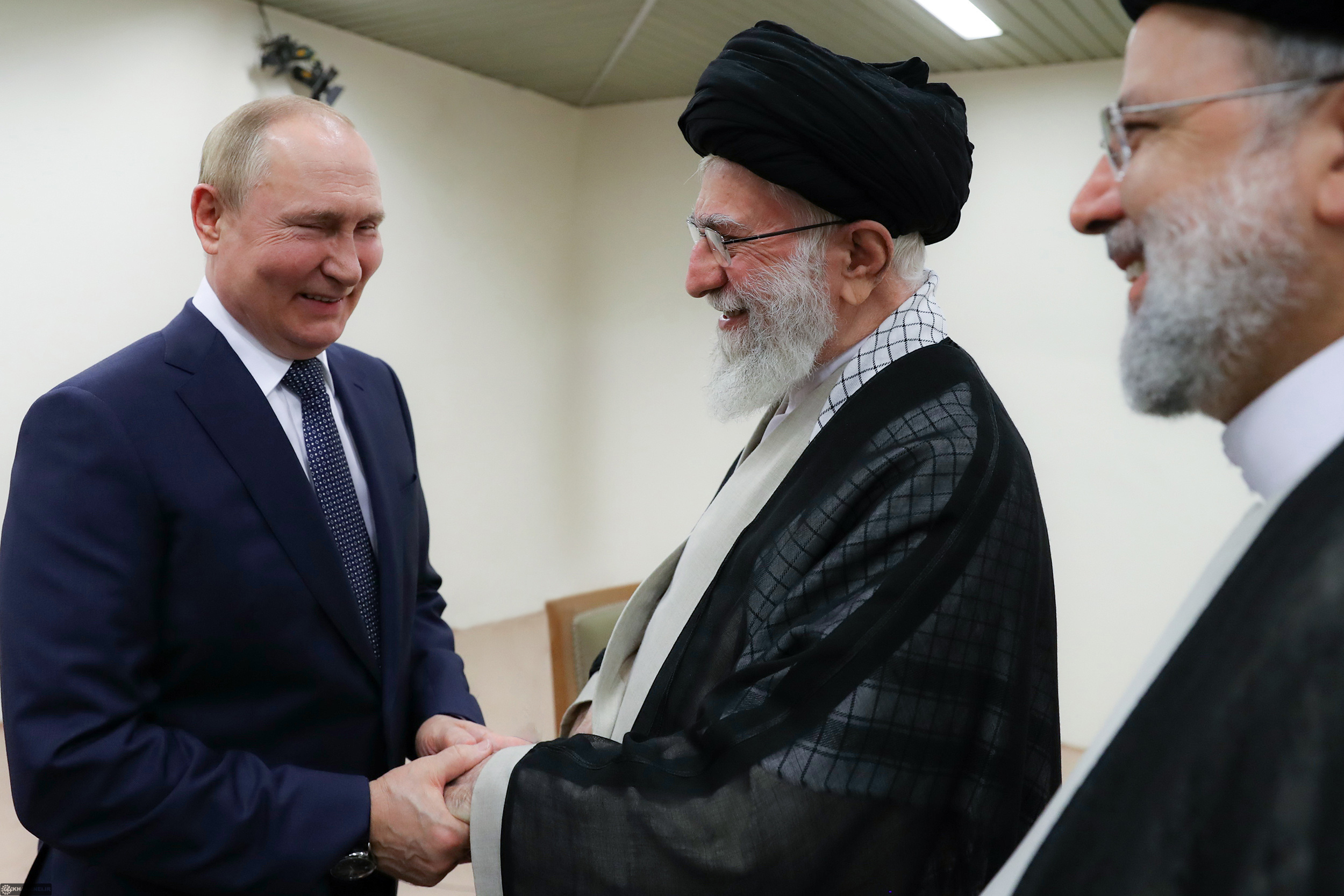
Khamenei and president Ebrahim Raisi (far right) meeting with Russian president Vladimir Putin, July 2022

Khamenei had "direct responsibility" for foreign policy, which "cannot be conducted without his direct involvement and approval". He had a foreign policy team independent of the president's, "which include[d] two former foreign ministers", and he could "at any time of his choosing inject himself into the process and 'correct' a flawed policy or decision". His foreign policy was said to steer a course that avoids either confrontation or accommodation with the West.

Khamenei condemned the Saudi Arabian-led intervention in Yemen and compared Saudi Arabia to Israel. Khamenei also condemned the persecution of Rohingya Muslims in Myanmar and called Myanmar's de facto leader and Nobel Peace Prize laureate Aung San Suu Kyi a "brutal woman". He condemned the United Arab Emirates as "useless" on several occasions.

After the U.S.'s 2018 withdrawal from the Iran nuclear deal, the 2020 assassination of Qasem Soleimani and the 2021 election of the conservative Ebrahim Raisi (who was supported by Khamenei) as president, Iran has taken a geopolitical course of further aligning with Russia and China. This became more evident in mid-2022 when Iran started supplying its HESA Shahed 136 drones to the Russian Armed Forces to be used against Ukraine. Coupled with Iran's support for attacks on American forces throughout the Middle East after the 2023 October 7 attacks and the decades-long military and nuclear collaboration between North Korea and Iran, these developments have led a number of critics to speak of a new Iran-Russia-China-North Korea "Axis of Upheaval". After Khamenei's assassination, Russian president Vladimir Putin said "In our country, Ayatollah Khamenei will be remembered as an outstanding statesman who made a huge personal contribution to the development of friendly Russian-Iranian relations and brought them to the level of a comprehensive strategic partnership". Khamenei supported the Iranian intervention in the Syrian civil war.

=== Revolutionary doctrine and exporting the revolution ===
The institutionalization of revolutionary ideology under Ali Khamenei has been presented by analysts as a continuation of Ruhollah Khomeini's post-1979 call for the "export of the Islamic Revolution". Khomeini had argued that the Islamic Republic's model of governance, grounded in the doctrine of velayat-e faqih (Guardianship of the Islamic Jurist), should extend beyond Iran's borders and inspire Muslim societies elsewhere.

The expansion of state-funded ideological institutions under Khamenei was described by analysts as part of a structured effort to promote and disseminate Khamenei's own interpretation of Shiʿism and governance, building upon but distinct from the revolutionary framework established after 1979. While Ruhollah Khomeini had called for the export of the Islamic Revolution, observers note that under Khamenei this objective evolved into a more institutionalized system designed to advance Khamenei's doctrinal vision domestically and internationally.

Publicly acknowledged budget documents indicate that at least 29 centers operate in Iran with mandates related to promoting Khamenei's specific ideological framework. These institutions appear as line items in the state budget. In 2019, despite significant economic hardship, the combined allocation for 23 of these centers amounted to approximately US$280 million at the exchange rates of that year. Among the twenty-nine institutions forming what observers describe as the core of the state's ideological infrastructure, one of the most prominent internationally is Al-Mustafa International University. Established in its current form during Khamenei's leadership, the university enrolls exclusively foreign students, in accordance with its founding statute, and provides religious education aligned with Khamenei's interpretation of Shiʿism and the doctrine of velayat-e faqih. The Iranian state reportedly covers the expenses of its students. At one point, total enrollment across its campuses was reported to exceed 100,000 students.

In addition to clerical training and cadre development, these institutions publish journals and books in multiple languages aimed at disseminating Khamenei's ideological perspective. They also organize religious events and large-scale Shiʿi commemorative gatherings in cities outside Iran. Analysts describe these activities as part of a sustained effort to export and institutionalize Khamenei's doctrinal model globally, rather than merely replicating the early revolutionary outreach of the 1980s.

=== Beliefs about the United States and its foreign policy ===
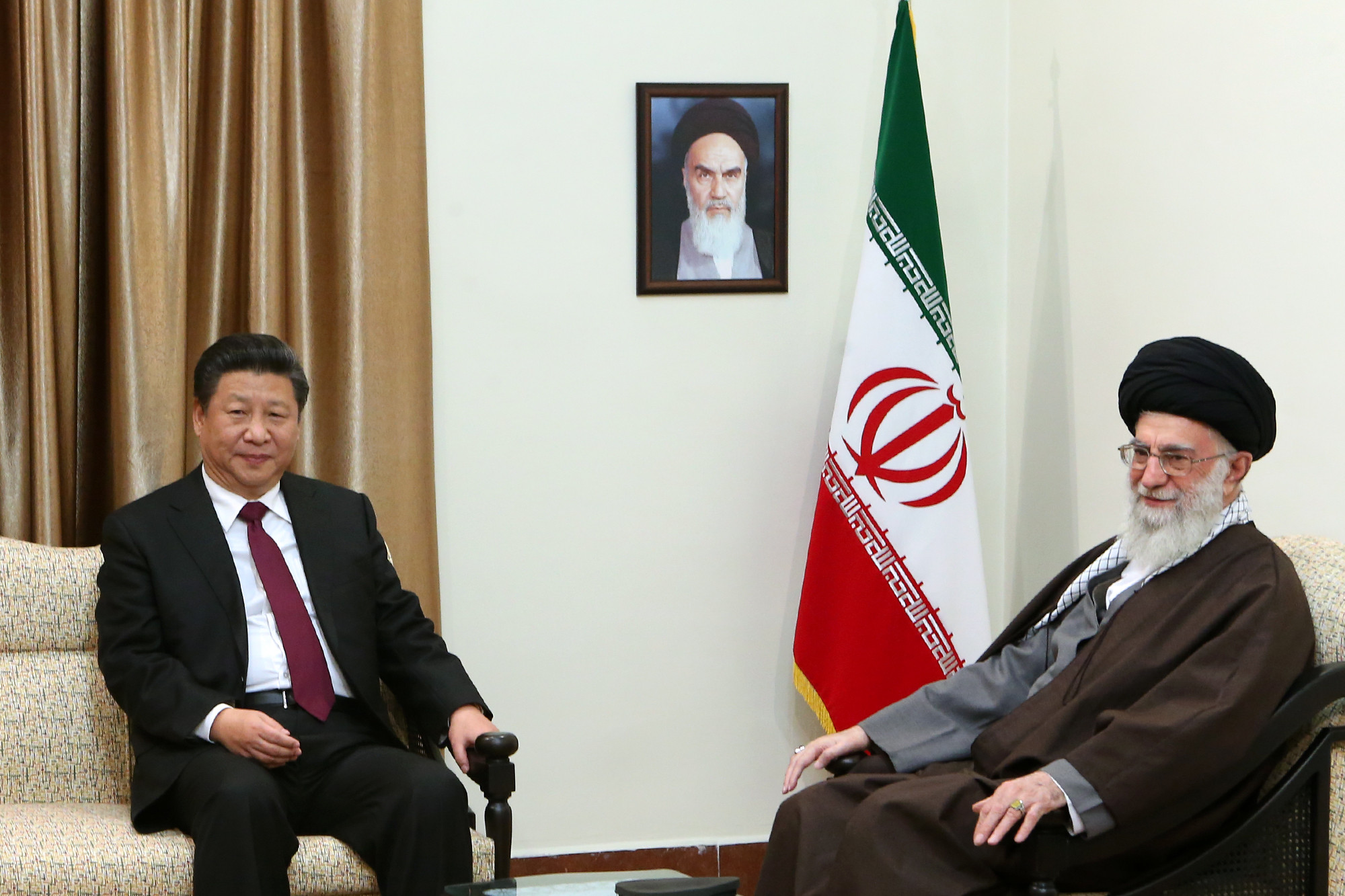
Khamenei meeting with his counterpart Xi Jinping, China's paramount leader, January 2016

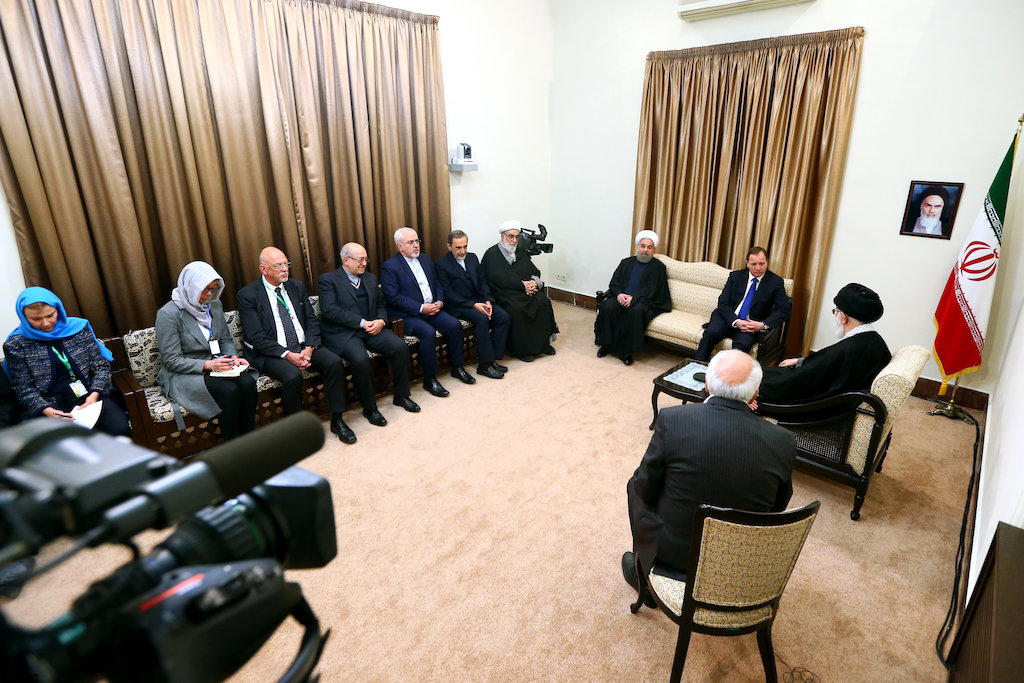
Khamenei with Swedish prime minister Stefan Löfven, February 2017

The United States and Iran have had no formal diplomatic relations since the Iran hostage crisis of 1980 when US embassy was taken over and US diplomats were taken prisoner. According to a study by Karim Sadjadpour, Khamenei's speeches frequently emphasize opposition to the United States as a central principle country's political discourse. Sadjadpour also notes that Khamenei has historically been skeptical of attempts to normalize relations with Washington, including initiatives pursued by presidents Akbar Hashemi Rafsanjani and Mohammad Khatami. Some analysts have noted that Khamenei will not pursue the weaponization of nuclear devices, with assessments suggesting such a step would likely be considered only in the event of an existential external threat.

In June 2006, Khamenei said that Iran would disrupt energy shipments from the Persian Gulf region, where about 20% of the world's daily supply of oil passes from the Persian Gulf through the Strait of Hormuz very close to Iran's coast, should the country come under attack from the US, insisting that Tehran will not give up its right to produce nuclear fuel. On 14 September 2007, on the first Friday prayer of Ramadan, Khamenei, who asserted that the United States was the main cause of insecurity in Iraq, predicted that George W. Bush and American officials would one day be tried in an international criminal court to be held "accountable" for the US-led Iraq War.

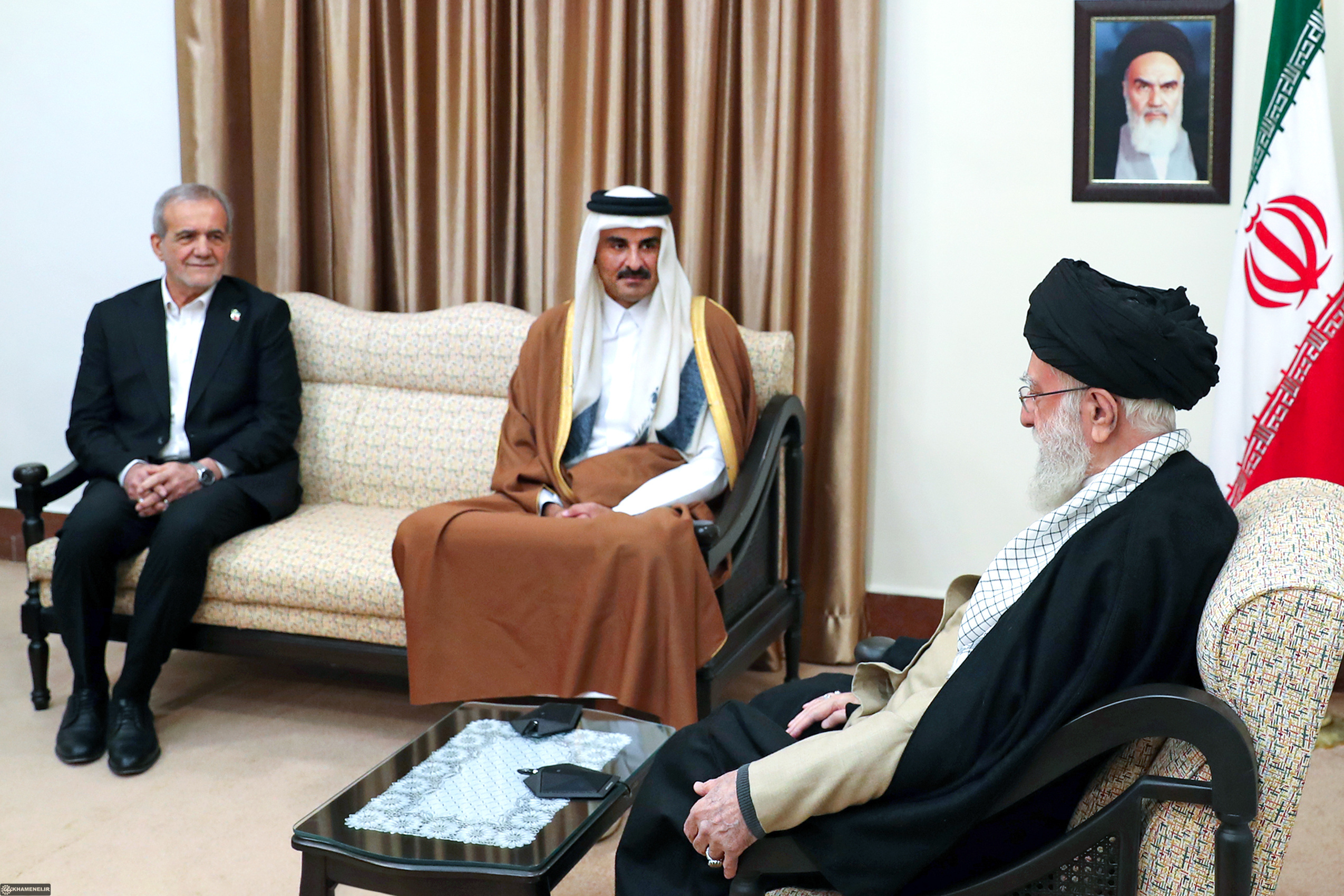
Khamenei and President Masoud Pezeshkian with Qatar's Emir Tamim bin Hamad Al Thani, February 2025

On 21 March 2009, a day after U.S. President Barack Obama advocated a "new beginning" in diplomatic relations between the two countries, Khamenei said a change of US "words" was not enough and added: "We will watch and we will judge (the new US administration) ... You change, our behavior will change". He rejected US foreign policy since the Islamic revolution, insisted the United States is "hated in the world" and should end its interference in other countries.

Khamenei criticised the NATO-led 2011 military intervention in Libya. On 21 March 2011, Khamenei accused the West of "coming after Libyan oil". He also stressed that "Iran utterly condemns the behavior of the Libyan government against its people, the killings and pressure on people, and the bombing of its cities... but it (also) condemns the military action in Libya." Khamenei stated that he supports sending mediators rather than bombing the country.

In June 2011, Khamenei accused the United States government of terrorism and rejected the American definition of terrorism; he was quoted as saying, "The U.S. and the European governments that follow it describe Palestinian combatant groups who fight for the liberation of their land as terrorists." In June 2012, Khamenei warned Western governments that the mounting sanctions on the country would only deepen the Iranians' hatred of the West. In October 2014, Khamenei said the U.S. and the U.K. created ISIS as a tool to fight Iran and "create insecurity" in the region.

Khamenei had previously banned engaging in any dialogues or negotiations with the United States, especially the Trump administration. However, in March 2025, senior Iranian officials conveyed a message that negotiating with the U.S. was crucial to prevent the Islamic Republic's potential collapse.

On 19 July 2015, while speaking at a mosque in Tehran, Khamenei said that the policies of the United States in the region were fundamentally opposed to Iran's political and religious movement. The speech was punctuated by chants of "Death to America" and "Death to Arrogance". Following the announcement of the Joint Comprehensive Plan of Action (JCPOA), Khamenei thanked the negotiators, though he also reiterated Iran's distrust of the United States.

In 2019, Khamenei stated that the slogan "Death to America" referred to U.S. policies and politicians like Trump, John Bolton and Mike Pompeo and policies rather than the American public, saying that Iranians were "not against the American people."

On 24 June 2019, the United States imposed sanctions on Khamenei with the signing of Executive Order 13876. In March 2020, Khamenei warned against a United States offer of "aid" to fight COVID-19 because it could be a way to hurt Iran by further spreading the disease. He also suggested the US had developed a special variety of the virus "based on Iranian genetic information they have gathered", although he provided no evidence for the theory. Khamenei explained, "The intelligence services of many countries cooperate with one another against us.". Iran also protested that U.S. sanctions were hindering the country's pandemic response, saying that the United Kingdom had blocked delivery of previously purchased surgical masks due to the sanctions.

In February 2024, it was announced that Meta Platforms had removed Khamenei's Facebook and Instagram accounts, citing repeated violations of its Dangerous Organizations and Individuals policy. In March 2022, Khamenei accused the United States of creating the conflict surrounding the Russo-Ukrainian war.

==== Anti-imperialist ideology ====
Scholars have described the Islamic Republic's governing ideology under Khamenei as rooted in resistance to Western influence and global power structures. Under Khamenei's leadership, the country's political identity has been characterized as revolving around opposition to what it termed "global arrogance," a concept used in official rhetoric to denote perceived Western hegemonic dominance. Khamenei consistently framed the US as the primary force of global imperialism, portraying confrontation with Western powers as central to its mission. Analyses of Khamenei's foreign policy notes his use of ideological strategies including Iranian nationalism and anti-imperialist rhetoric, used both to project regional influence while resisting Western pressure.

==== Condemnation of the 11 September attacks ====
After the September 11 attacks in 2001, Khamenei condemned the act and the attackers, and called for a condemnation of terrorist activities all over the world but warned strongly against a military intervention in Afghanistan. He was quoted as saying, "Mass killings of human beings are catastrophic acts which are condemned wherever they may happen and whoever the perpetrators and the victims may be".

=== Arab Spring ===
During February 2011, Ali Khamenei supported the Egyptian uprising against their government, describing it as Islamic awakening instead of Arab Spring. Trying to communicate with the Arab people, he addressed Egypt's protesters in Arabic even though his native language was Persian. He introduced himself as "your brother in religion", while praising the "explosion of sacred anger". Later in "Islamic Awakening" conferences held in Tehran, Khamenei praised the Muslim youths of Tunisia, Libya, Egypt, Yemen and Bahrain for what he described as Islamic awakening. He also paralleled these events with the Islamic revolution in Iran during his Nowruz oration in 2011.

=== Zionism and Israel ===
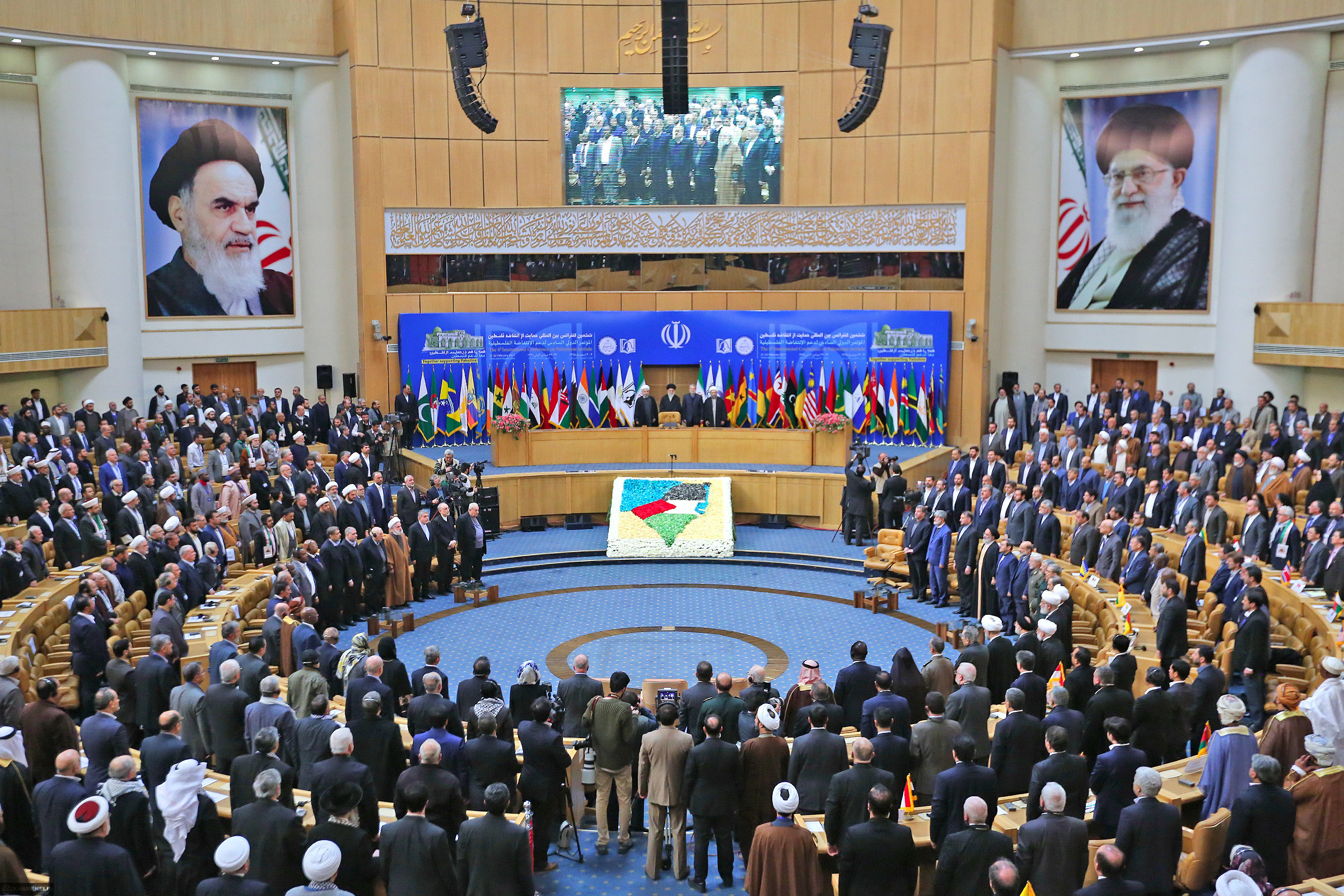
Sixth International Conference in Support of the Palestinian Intifada, Tehran, 2017

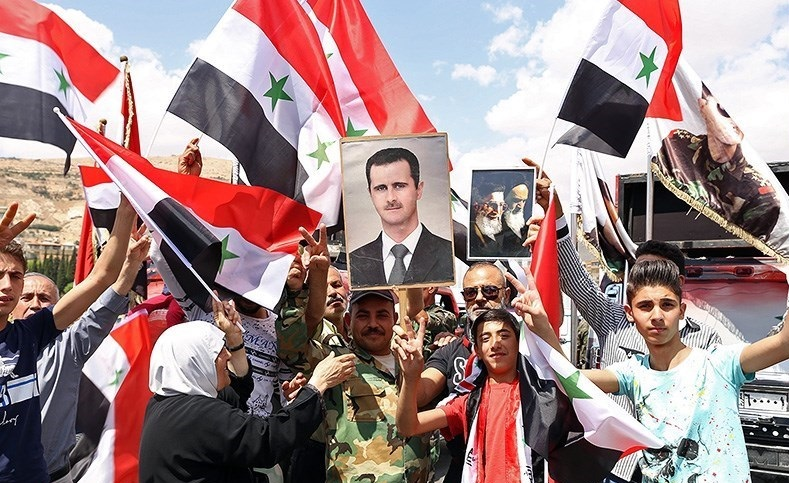
Pro-government Syrians with portraits of Bashar al-Assad, Ayatollah Khomeini, and Khamenei, April 2018

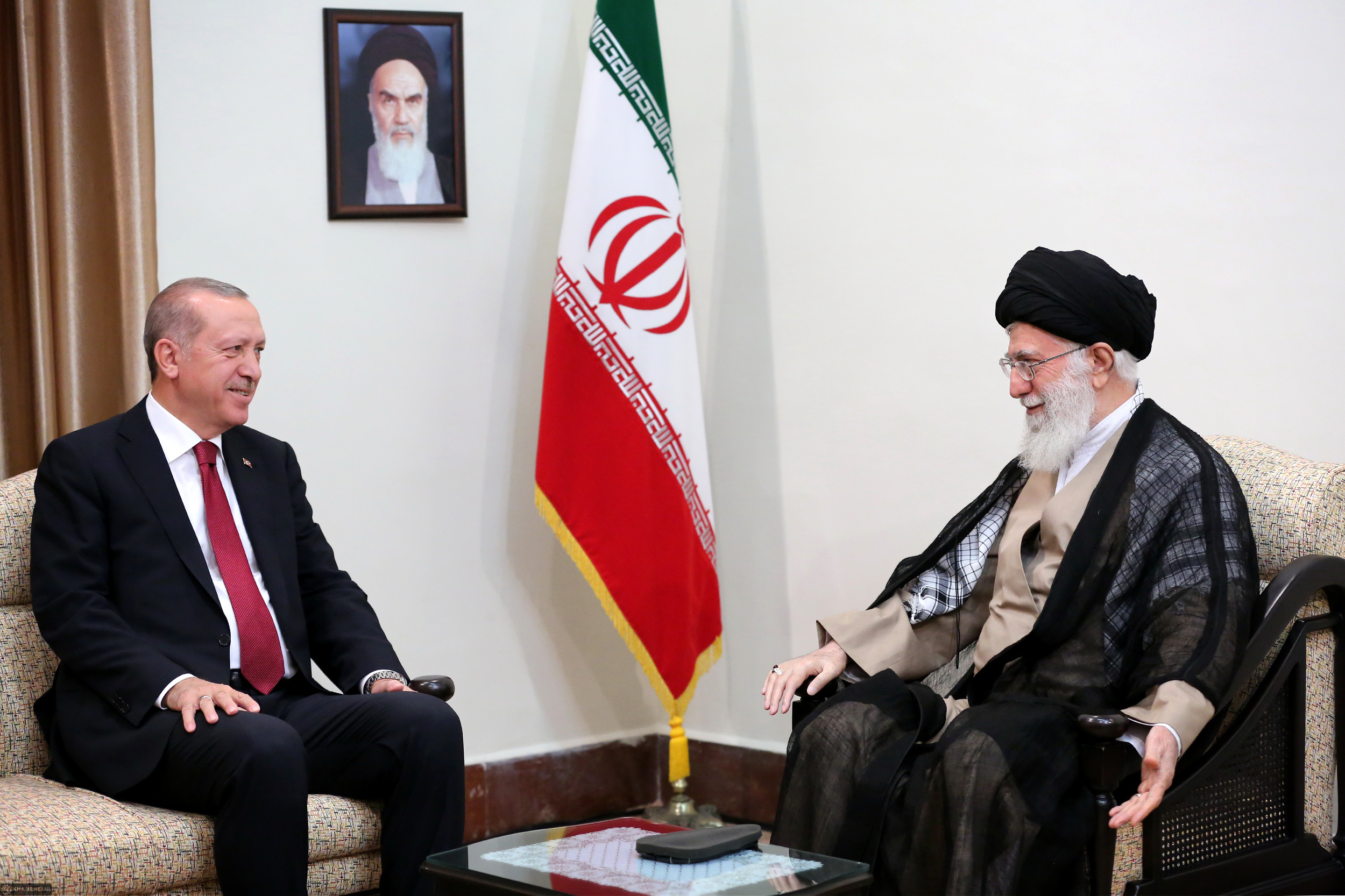
Khamenei with Turkish president Recep Tayyip Erdoğan in Tehran, September 2018

Khamenei was an opponent of the State of Israel and Zionism and was criticized for making threats against Israel and for antisemitic rhetoric. Khamenei called Israel a "cancerous tumor". In 2013, he called Israel a "rabid dog", as well as in 2014, during the Gaza war, in response to the killing of Palestinian civilians. In 2014, a tweet from an account attributed to Khamenei claimed that there was no "cure" for Israel but its destruction.

In a September 2008 sermon for Friday prayers in Tehran, Khamenei stated that "it is incorrect, irrational, pointless and nonsense to say that we are friends of Israeli people", for he believes that the occupation is done by means of them. "[U]surpation of houses, lands, and business [of Palestinian people] are carried out using these people. They are the background actors of Zionist elements," said Khamenei in his speech. "[W]e have no problem with Jews and Christians ... we have problem with the usurpers of Palestine [sic] land," he added. Also, he said that he had raised the issue "to spell an end to any debates".

In 2013, Khamenei accused France of "kneeling" before Israel, while saying that Israel was led by people unworthy of the "title 'human'". Nevertheless, according to anti-regime change activist Abbas Edalat, in 2005, Khamenei responded to a remark by then-President Ahmadinejad which had been widely translated as saying that the "regime occupying Jerusalem should be wiped off the map" by saying that "the Islamic Republic has never threatened and will never threaten any country".

In a September 2009 sermon, Khamenei was quoted as saying that "the Zionist cancer is gnawing into the lives of Islamic nations." In another report of the same speech, he stated that "we will support and help any nations, any groups fighting against the Zionist regime across the world, and we are not afraid of declaring this." Khamenei instead proposed that "Palestinian refugees should return and Muslims, Christians and Jews could choose a government for themselves, excluding immigrant Jews", adding, "No one will allow a bunch of thugs, lechers and outcasts from London, America and Moscow to rule over the Palestinians".

On 10 September 2015, in a speech about Israel after agreement on the nuclear program of Iran, Khamenei made the controversial remark that "Israel won't exist in 25 years". The statement was also published on Khamenei's official website and his Twitter. This statement was reported as voted as the best and most important among Khamenei's statements in 2015 by an online poll conducted by his official website.

On 21 February 2017, at the 6th International Conference in Support of the Palestinian Intifada, Khamenei regarded the withdrawal of Israel from south Lebanon in 2000 and from Gaza in 2005 as two major achievements so far. Also, he advised the Islamic countries to refrain from "useless" crises and differences and instead concentrate on the issue of Palestine, which he regarded as the core issue of Islam. He added: "Otherwise, the potentials and capabilities of the nations will go to waste in the face of vain struggles, which would provide opportunities for the Zionist regime to become even stronger."

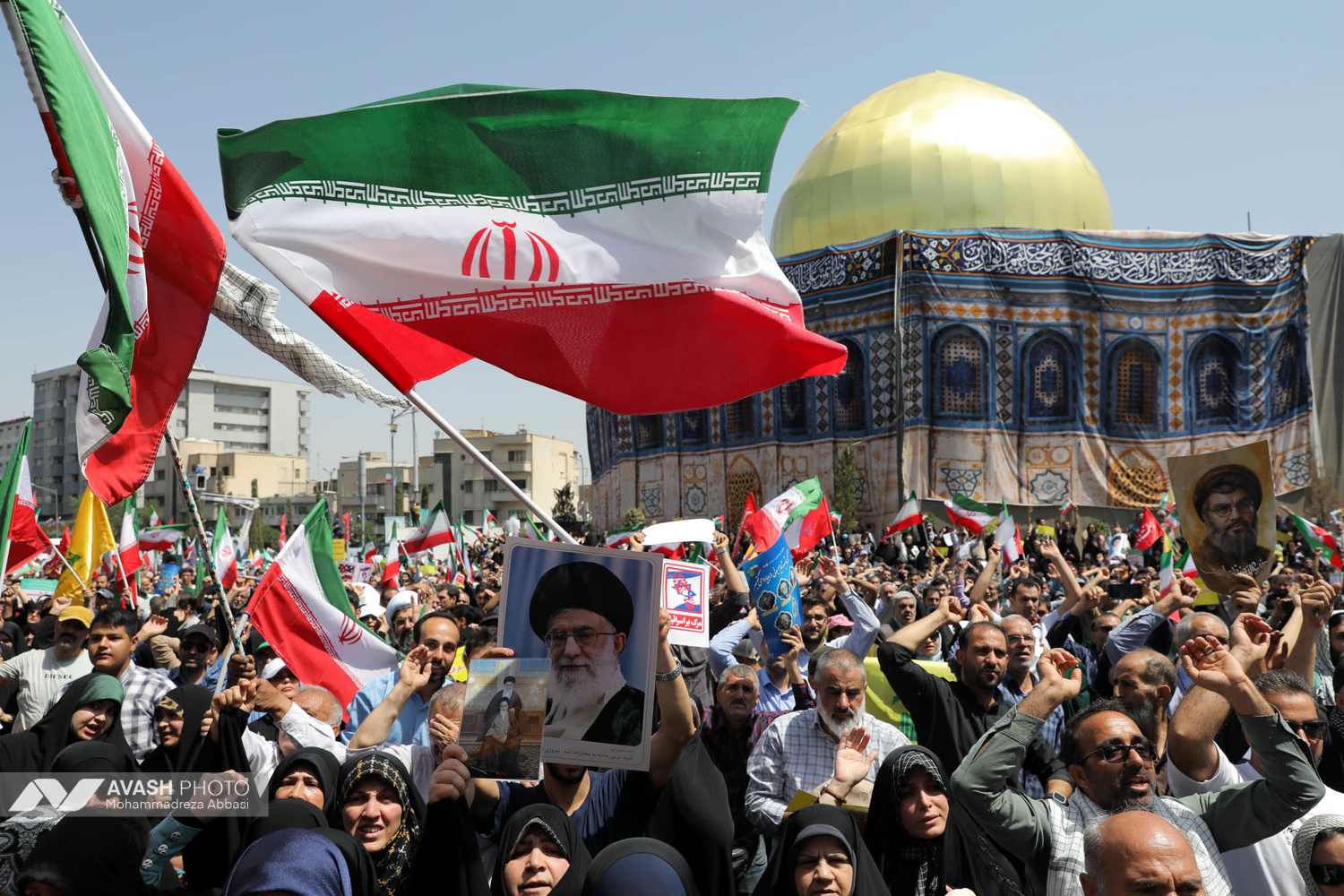
Protest in Tehran against the Israeli strikes on Iran, June 2025

In September 2020, Khamenei condemned the peace agreement between Israel and the United Arab Emirates and charged the UAE with betraying the Islamic world, the Arab countries, and Palestine. He stated that the normalisation will be only temporary, but the UAE will forever have to bear the shame regarding the deal. In October 2023, Khamenei praised the October 7 attacks, but denied Iran's involvement. He condemned Israel's bombing of the Gaza Strip in retaliation for the Hamas attack and accused Israel of committing genocide against the Palestinian people in Gaza.

==== 2025 Twelve-Day War ====
Israel launched surprise attacks on key military and nuclear facilities in Iran on 13 June 2025, which started the Twelve-Day War. Israeli air and ground forces assassinated some of Iran's prominent military leaders, nuclear scientists, and politicians. and damaged or destroyed Iran's air defenses and some of its nuclear and military facilities. Iran retaliated with waves of missile and drone strikes against Israeli cities and military sites.

The United States, which defended Israel against Iranian missiles and drones, took offensive action on the ninth day of the war by bombing three Iranian nuclear sites. Iran retaliated by firing missiles at a U.S. base in Qatar. On 24 June, Israel and Iran agreed to a ceasefire after insistence from the U.S.

In the wake of this war, Khamenei was reportedly moved to a fortified underground bunker in Tehran with his family, where he remained largely isolated from external communication. Khamenei rejected U.S. president Trump's call for Iranian surrender. Khamenei was also subjected to threats of assassination by Trump, Israel's prime minister Benjamin Netanyahu, and defense minister Israel Katz. Katz stated in 2025 that his country wanted to kill Iran's supreme leader, Ali Khamenei, during the Twelve-Day War. Israeli Prime Minister Benjamin Netanyahu, in June 2025, said that he had not ruled out assassinating Khamenei in the future. US President Donald Trump reportedly vetoed an Israeli plan in June 2025 to kill Ali Khamenei.

Following the Twelve-Day War ceasefire, he resurfaced on 26 June via a recorded clip to warn the United States against future attacks. Khamenei's isolation during the war, with access limited to his closest aides, complicated diplomatic efforts in Geneva by making him difficult to reach. Afterwards, Khamenei declared victory over Israel and threatened further attacks on American military bases, escalating tensions with the United States. In response, President Trump dismissed Khamenei's statements, telling him he had been decisively defeated.

An Iran International article interviewed civilians, expressing disappointment in Khamenei during and after the war. One referred to him as a "coward" hiding in his bunker, another said Khamenei was living in an "illusion", believing Iran won the war and declaring victory.

On 5 July 2025, Khamenei made his first public appearance since the war with Israel had begun.

He and a Tehran compound associated with him were again targeted seven-months later, on 28 February 2026, in Israeli and United States strikes.

==== Antisemitism ====
Khamenei denied the Holocaust on multiple occasions.

A 2006 speech of Khamenei contains the phrase that was translated into English as "the myth of the massacre of Jews". In a 2013 interview, Iran's then-Foreign Minister Javad Zarif said Khamenei had been mistranslated, and his comments were taken out of context. Zarif added: "I have spoken to the [Supreme] leader on this issue, he rejects and condemns the killing of innocent people. No, the Holocaust is not a myth."

On 21 March 2014, Khamenei said that "the Holocaust is an event whose reality is uncertain and if it has happened, it's uncertain how it has happened". Because of the potential legal consequences in some countries, he commented: "No one in European countries dares to speak about [the] Holocaust." He also said that in the West, "speaking about [the] Holocaust and expressing doubts about it is considered to be a great sin."

On Holocaust Memorial Day, 27 January 2016, Khamenei posted a Holocaust-denying video on his official website. The video, drawing on the March 2014 speech and lasting about three minutes, featured images of Holocaust deniers Roger Garaudy, Robert Faurisson, and David Irving. In December 2019, Khamenei praised Garaudy, a convert to Islam, and said that Garaudy's conviction for Holocaust denial violated freedom of speech. In 2020, Khamenei tweeted asking "Why is it a crime to raise doubts about the Holocaust ... while insulting the Prophet (PBUH) is allowed?"

Journalist Yair Rosenberg argues that statements by Khamenei purporting to attack "Zionism" are following an antisemitic tradition of avoiding censorship by using "Zionism" as a dog whistle for "Jews". For example, an 8 June 2022 statement tweeted by Khamenei reads: "The Zionists have always been a plague, even before establishing the fraudulent Zionist regime. Even then, Zionist capitalists were a plague for the whole world." According to Rosenberg, it makes more sense (although it is just as slanderous) if "Zionists" is replaced by "Jews". The Zionist movement was not founded until the late 19th century, and thus Zionists are not likely to "have always been a plague".

Other accusations of antisemitism have come from Victoria Coates and Ellie Cohanim, who observe his Holocaust denial and find his "nine-point plan" to "wipe" Israel "off the face of the earth" uncomfortably reminiscent of Hitler's Final Solution; and The Jerusalem Post, who quote Khamenei's attack on the 2020 Israel–United Arab Emirates normalization agreement: "The nation of Palestine is under various, severe pressures. Then, the UAE acts in agreement with the Israelis and filthy Zionist agents of the U.S. – such as the Jewish member of Trump's family – with utmost cruelty against the interests of the World of Islam." They argue that "filthy Zionist agents", "the Jewish member of Trump's family" (i.e. Jared Kushner and his wife Ivanka Trump), and "cruel" are all words channeling "antisemitic tropes and dog whistles".

== Open letters ==
Khamenei wrote several open letters. "To the Youth in Europe and North America" was written on 21 January 2015. Khamenei wrote a second letter to the students enrolled at American universities on 30 May 2024. While describing Israel's actions as "genocide and apartheid", Khamenei asked the students to continue their protests against what he called "brutal Zionist regime".

In his letter, Khamenei expressed empathy and solidarity with the students protesting against Israel's attacks in Gaza. He referred to these students as a "branch of the Resistance Front" and predicted their victory with the "permission of God". Khamenei also ran a fund raising campaign for victims of conflicts in Gaza and Lebanon.

Khamenei further wrote an open letter to American students in 2024, which garnered a harsh reaction from the United States. In the letter he described American students protesting against Israel as a new branch of the Axis of Resistance, and called on them to familiarize themselves with the Quran.
