= Letter4u =

Letter4u may refer to:

- To the Youth in Europe and North America
- To the Youth in Western Countries
