= Ali Khamenei bibliography =

This is a bibliography of the works of Ali Khamenei, who served as Iran's president from 1981 to 1989 and as supreme leader from 1989 until his assassination in 2026.

Generally, his works can be classified into four periods of time:

- The first period, related to the period of the revolutionary activities from 1963 to 1979, that most of Khamenei's scientific-activity took place in the period and consists of approximately 10 compilations and translations;
- The second period relates to the post-revolutionary period (1979–1982);
- The third period is about his presidency (1981–1989);
- The fourth period is regarding his tenure as supreme leader (1989–2026).

Khamenei's books can be divided into 4 categories—in a category based on the type of writing; including: authorial researches, books collected from lessons/lectures, translations, and translation-compilations.

== Compilations ==
Seyyed Ali Khamenei's compilations consist of the works, such as:

- Pishwayeh-Sadeq (i.e. Honest leader)
- A report from the seminary of Mashhad
- Four main books of Biographical-Evaluation
- Az Zharfaye Namaz (From the depths of prayer)
- An Outline of Islamic Thought in the Quran
- Goftari Dar Babe Sabr (A speech about patience)
- Ruhe-Tawhid, Nafye Obudiate GheireKhoda (The Spirit of Monotheism, Rejection of non-God Obedience)
- Seeking Forgiveness and Repentance (Al-Burāq, 2018) ISBN 9780359356065
- ʿĀshūrāʾ (Al-Burāq, 2021) ISBN 9781956276046
- Lessons from the Nahjul Balagha (Al-Burāq, 2021) ISBN 9781956276077
- 101 Tips for a Happy Marriage (Al-Burāq, 2022) ISBN 9781956276114

Etc.

== Translations ==
- Al-Mustaqbal Le-Haz-al-Din (The future in the realm of Islam)
- Solh al-Hassan (the peace of [Imam] al-Hassan)
- Al-Moshkelat Wa Moshkelat al-Hezarah
- Tafseer Fi Zelal al-Quran

== Compilation-translation ==
Kafah al-Moslemin Fi Tahrir al-Hend (Persian: مسلمانان در نهضت آزادی هندوستان), (Arabic: کفاح المسلمين فی تحریر الهند), is a work, translated and compiled by Seyyed Ali Khamenei (the author: Abdul-Monaem al-Nemr), published in 1968.

== Collected by others ==
Among the works of Seyyed Ali Khamenei which have been collected by others, are as follows:

- A 250 Years Old Person (2020) ISBN 9798654222589
- Palestine (2011 book)
- Javdaneh Tarikh (Immortal History)
- Expression of the Qur'an Interpretation of Surah Mujadaleh
- The book of “Khaterat-e Jebhe-ye-1”

The book of “Khaterat-e Jebhe-ye 1”, (Persian: خاطرات جبهه-۱) including the interview text of Iran’s second channel of Islamic Republic of Iran Broadcasting with Seyyed Ali Khamenei on 19 September 1984 – on the occasion of the fourth anniversary of Iran-Iraq War. He mentions memoirs from the commencing months of the war. And is also in regards to the liberation of Susangerd.

- The book of "Jelvehaye Ma’navi wa Erfani-ye Ashoora"

Jelvehaye Ma’navi wa Erfani-ye Ashoora (Spiritual and Mystical Manifestations of Ashura), (Persian: جلوه های معنوی و عرفانی عاشورا) consists of two speeches of Seyyed Ali Khamenei on “27 September 1985” and 4 December 1988; the first speech was a lecture in Friday prayer in Muharram, and the second speech was his statements in the birthday of Husayn ibn Ali.

== Articles ==
"The introduction of Rejal-Keshi (book)", this article is the rewriting of the research-article of "Four main books of Biographical-Evaluation", written by Seyyed Ali Khamenei (1972), which was published in Abdul Hosein Amini's note; this article has also been published as one of the entries of letter "R" (ر) --the 19th volume of "Encyclopedia of the Islamic World".

"Islam naturally stands against liberal democracy’s plot to dominate the world" is a speech Khamenei delivered in February 2023 where he elaborates on his view that liberal democracy stands against Islam as he sees it.

== See also ==
- To the Youth in Europe and North America, a 2015 open letter from Ali Khamenei
- Ruhe-Tawhid, Nafye Obudiate GheireKhoda, a religious book written by Khamenei in 1977
- Sharh-e Esm (book), a biography of Ali Khamenei covering 1939 to 1979
- Nuclear Fatwa Under International Law (book), 2017 book about the legality of nuclear weapons
- Morteza Motahhari bibliography, bibliography of Shiite cleric and professor of Islamic philosophy and theology
