= Letter to the American People =

Letter published by al-Qaeda in 2002

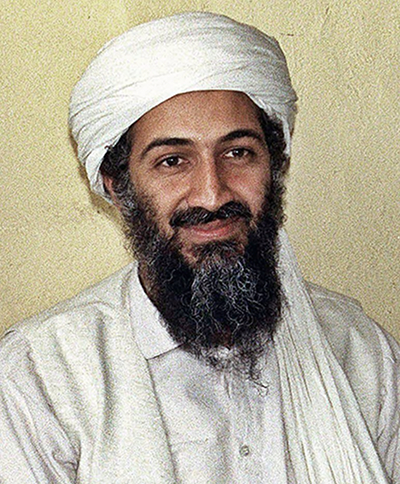
- Osama bin Laden, 1st General Emir of al-Qaeda
- Created: November 2002
- Commissioned by: Al-Qaeda
- Author: Osama bin Laden
- Purpose: Justifying al-Qaeda's war against United States as defensive jihad against U.S. aggression; Promising the escalation of war until the withdrawal of American forces from Muslim lands; Criticism of American cultural values, support for Israel and for their government

Letter to the American People (Arabic: رسالة إلى الشعب الأمريكي, romanized: Risāla ʾIlā al-Shʿab al-ʾAmrīkī; also known as Letter to America) is a manifesto of Osama bin Laden, published by al-Qaeda in November 2002. Initially appearing on a Saudi website linked to al-Qaeda, its English translation was widely shared online and was published by The Observer, a British Sunday newspaper affiliated with The Guardian. The letter criticizes American foreign policy in the Middle East—particularly as it applies to its support of Israel—to justify attacks on American targets; it also employs antisemitic tropes. While the letter presents rationalization for the September 11 attacks perpetrated by al-Qaeda a year prior, it does not explicitly claim responsibility for them (bin Laden would first publicly do so in a 2004 video tape).

The content blends religious, moral, and political critiques against the United States, portraying it as an imperial power hostile to the Muslim world, and justifies war against the U.S. The letter criticizes the U.S. for not adopting sharia (Islamic law), condemns its economic practices like usury, and accuses it of moral decay due to the social acceptance of practices contrary to purported Islamic values. It also accuses the U.S. of supporting oppressive regimes in Muslim countries and exploiting their resources. The letter justifies targeting American civilians in retaliation against the indiscriminate attacks of U.S. military forces, arguing that U.S. nationals indirectly support U.S. policies through democracy and taxes. It urges Americans to embrace Islam and demands the U.S. to withdraw its military from Muslim lands and end support for corrupt leaders. It also propagates conspiracy theories, including the claim that AIDS was a "Satanic American Invention".

The letter gained renewed attention in 2023 amid the Gaza war, after a compilation of TikTok videos referencing the letter went viral on Twitter. The Guardian removed the letter from its website, citing context issues. TikTok, responding to the videos' virality, removed hashtags and videos related to or featuring the letter's contents. This resurgence sparked discussions on online radicalization, state-sponsored Internet propaganda, and Internet censorship, and the implications of suppressing or allowing access to such content.

== History ==
The letter was published in 2002 on a Saudi website previously used for dissemination by al-Qaeda. Following the publication, the letter's English translation was repeatedly posted online by Islamists in the United Kingdom. In November 2002, British newspaper The Observer published the translated letter.

Karen J. Greenberg asserted that the letter's attribution to Osama bin Laden was debatable, arguing that it lacked accompanying video or audio and that issues like AIDS and incest, which had not been brought up in bin Laden's past messages, were mentioned in it. Nevertheless, she has included it in the collection of statements of Bin Laden published in her 2010 book Al-Qaeda Now.

Faisal Devji theorized that the letter was primarily a propaganda tool due to the wide array of topics it addresses. In his analysis of bin Laden's accusations, Devji refers to the manifesto as "a stereotyped litany of global wrongs more ethical than political in nature." Simultaneously, Devji lauded the letter for presenting a highly ethical and "well-reasoned analysis" that challenged the American political system and U.S. foreign policy.

Robert O. Marlin has listed the letter among the two most significant documents issued by bin Laden, alongside his 1996 Declaration of War against the United States.

== Contents ==
In his letter, Bin Laden's critique of the United States emerges, blending religious doctrines, moral judgments, and political grievances. The letter portrays the United States as a deeply hostile imperial power implementing aggressive policies against the Muslim world, and justifies waging defensive war against the U.S. Bin Laden wrote:

"Why are we fighting and opposing you? The answer is very simple:

(1) Because you attacked us and continue to attack us.

One criticism of the letter is the U.S.'s rejection of Islamic Sharia law in its governance. It contrasts the secular, human-designed legal system of the U.S. with the divine law of Islam, portraying the former as a product of human desires and whims.

Economic practices in the U.S., particularly the allowance of usury (interest on loans), are condemned. The author decries usury as a violation not only of Islamic principles but also of moral standards across religions. Bin Laden suggests that such economic policies contribute to wider social and economic injustices and accuses Jews of controlling the United States "policies, media and economy". The letter also states:

It brings us both laughter and tears to see that you have not yet tired of repeating your fabricated lies that the Jews have a historical right to Palestine, as it was promised to them in the Torah. Anyone who disputes with them on this alleged fact is accused of anti-semitism. This is one of the most fallacious, widely-circulated fabrications in history. The people of Palestine are pure Arabs and original Semites. It is the Muslims who are the inheritors of Moses (peace be upon him) and the inheritors of the real Torah that has not been changed.

Bin Laden lambasts the U.S. for what he perceives as widespread moral decay, citing the social acceptance and legalization of practices like fornication, homosexuality, and gambling. These, in his view, stand in stark contrast to Islamic values. The letter also depicts the United States as a country with deep hypocrisy, employing double standards against non-Western nations. Some examples of American hypocrisy listed in the letter include U.S. support for the Israeli occupation of Palestinian territories and the forced abduction and torture of prisoners in Guantanamo prison without trials. Bin Laden wrote:

"Let us not forget one of your major characteristics: your duality in both manners and values; your hypocrisy in manners and principles. ... The freedom and democracy that you call to is for yourselves and for white race only; as for the rest of the world, you impose upon them your monstrous, destructive policies and governments, which you call the 'American friends'. Yet you prevent them from establishing democracies. When the Islamic party in Algeria wanted to practice democracy and they won the election, you unleashed your agents in the Algerian army onto them, and to attack them with tanks and guns, to imprison them and torture them – a new lesson from the 'American book of democracy'!!!"

The letter also accuses the U.S. of supporting oppressive regimes in Muslim countries, thereby preventing the establishment of Islamic Sharia law and contributing to the oppression of Muslims. The U.S. is held accountable for economic exploitation, particularly of oil resources in Muslim regions, and for its military involvement in these countries. This includes its support for Israel, notably in actions against Palestinians and plans regarding Jerusalem.

In the letter, bin Laden argues for targeting American civilians, saying that as taxpayers, they indirectly support their government's military interventions in Muslim countries and policies towards Israel. This stance leads to his call for jihad, resistance, and revenge.

The letter invites Americans to embrace Islam, cease what it denounces as oppressive and immoral acts, and reflect on their societal and political values. Bin Laden also demands the U.S. to withdraw its military forces from Muslim lands, end its support for corrupt leaders in these regions, and cease interfering with Islamic education.

The letter concludes with a warning of continued and escalating war if these demands are not met.

== Gaza war and resurgence ==
=== "Went Viral on TikTok" ===
The letter received renewed attention amid the Gaza war, after several videos on TikTok highlighted the letter and Bin Laden's views against U.S. support for the Israeli occupation of Palestinian territories. Euronews and The Washington Post noted that TikTok users endorsed the parts of the letter related to the Israeli–Palestinian conflict, but omitted mention of its homophobic and misogynistic arguments.

TikTok removed the hashtag "#lettertoamerica" and other variations from its search engine shortly after the videos had spread, with The Washington Post reporting that tagged videos received more than 15 million views in total prior to its removal. Alex Haurek, a spokesperson for TikTok, stated that reports of the videos trending on the platform were inaccurate before going on to say that TikTok was "proactively and aggressively" removing videos from the platform for violating its rules on supporting acts of terrorism. Yashar Ali, an American journalist, shared a compilation of these videos that had over 38 million views on Twitter as of November 16, 2023. An article in The Washington Post suggested that the spread of the letter had been limited prior to Ali's compilation posts, following which the coverage of the letter skyrocketed. Wired suggested that the controversy was being used by American right-wing and far-right figures to push for the ban of TikTok. Some disinformation researchers suggested that the letter's resurgence was possibly the result of a coordinated influence campaign. Several sources described the reaction to the videos as a moral panic.

The renewed attention to the letter prompted The Guardian to retract it from its website, citing the lack of context surrounding the letter as the reason for its removal.

The sudden propagation of the letter and attempts to suppress its contents have sparked commentary regarding online youth radicalization, state-sponsored Internet propaganda, and Internet censorship. Renée DiResta, a writer and research manager at Stanford Internet Observatory (SIO), criticized The Guardian on Threads for removing the full text from its website, saying,

Don't turn the long-public ravings of a terrorist into forbidden knowledge, something people feel excited to go rediscover. Let people read the murderer's demands – this is the man some TikTok fools chose to glorify. Add more context.

In contrast, Marco Bastos, a senior lecturer in media and communication at City, University of London, described The Guardian as being in a no-win scenario.

If they don't take down the content, the content will be leveraged and it will be discussed, potentially shared and is going to go viral – if not out of context, then certainly outside of the scope of the original piece... If they take it down, they’re going to be accused, as they are right now, of censorship.

=== Israeli reactions ===
The SITE Intelligence Group, an Israeli-American non-governmental group that tracks online extremism, reported that users of Islamist forums associated with al-Qaeda celebrated the document's newfound attention. In response to the letter trending on various platforms, the Israel Defense Forces posted a brief message on Twitter condemning the letter.

== See also ==
- "To the Youth in Europe and North America" and "To the Youth in Western Countries," 2015 open letters from Ayatollah Ali Khamenei
