= Cultural engineering =

Cultural engineering may refer to:

- Walden Two#Cultural engineering
- Culture change
- Cultural engineering document
- Cultural Revolution
