= Second Phase of the Revolution =

2019 statement by Ali Khamenei

The "Second Phase of the Revolution" (Persian: گام دوم انقلاب), or "Second Step of the Revolution", was a statement issued by the supreme leader of Iran, Sayyid Ali Khamenei, addressed to the nation, particularly the youth, on February 11^{th} 2019, the fortieth anniversary of the victory of the Iranian Revolution.

In "The second phase of the revolution", also known as "The second phase" or "The second step", Khamenei expresses the achievements of the last forty years. He presents recommendations toward the goal of "a great Jihad for the sake of making a great Islamic Iran". Khamenei clarifies the issue of "the second step" towards Islamic Revolution ideals in seven sections.

He further recounts how the Islamic revolution propagated a spirit of "ما میتوانیم" (we can do it) amongst the Iranian people, and expresses thanks toward the enemies’ sanctions for teaching the nation to rely on its domestic capacities, referring to them as a source of great blessings.

== The statement ==
The statement outlines the political dimensions of the "second phase of the revolution," emphasizing the protection of the revolution's achievements, the promotion of its political civilization, and independence from both the capitalist West and the communist East. It criticizes bureaucratic complacency, reaffirms Iran's military defense strategy, and asserts that Marxism did not serve as a model for the revolution. The statement further claims that the Iranian Revolution reshaped global politics, democratized governance in Iran, and established public security and popular participation as fundamental principles of the political system. It also argues that the revolution enhanced the political awareness of the Iranian people and identifies dignity, wisdom, and expediency as the guiding principles of the country.

A part of this statement speech, which is addressed to (young) people by Seyyed Ali Khamenei, is as follows:

"Dear ones! ... Many of what we have seen and experimented with, your generation has not experienced and seen yet. We have seen, and you will see. The decades ahead are your decades, and it is you who should protect your revolution while you are qualified and full of motivation, and move it closer to its great ideal: that is, the emergence of a new Islamic civilization and the preparation for the rising of the great sun of wilayat ..."

According to the IBNA (Iran Book News Agency), "Workbook on the Declaration of the Second Step of the Islamic Revolution" is a practical document that is related to the statement of the second step of the revolution and has now reached its 16th edition. The main idea of this book is taken from the leader of the Islamic Republic of Iran and is based on the general geometry of this statement by Ali Khamenei.

== Reactions ==
The President of the Islamic Republic of Iran, Seyyed Ebrahim Ra'isi, called the statement of the second step of the Islamic Revolution one of the most important upstream documents and documents of change in all parts of the country. He also added: "The second step of the revolution has carefully explained the current situation and the path that must be taken for change." Ra'isi said: "In this statement, the existing truth is well explained and on the other hand, the necessary strategies and measures aimed at reaching the peaks of the new Islamic civilization and a society free from corruption and destruction are also accurately described."

This statement drew reactions and analyses from domestic and foreign authorities. The former president of Iran, Hassan Rouhani, noted that it removes the claims/inductions of the enemies; and emphasized that the government of Iran considers the performance of "the second step" as a priority. Rouhani also expressed that all Iranians must practice it.

The Supreme Council of Hawzas, among its decisive support for the statement, has considered the statement in its obligations/goals --to put it into action. Makarem Shirazi, an Iranian Shia Marja', supported the statement during his class performance in Azam mosque of Qom, and named it as a very precise/comprehensive statement which has a strong and applicable program for the next 40 years of the Islamic revolution, which can make us powerful in the world/region.

Mohammad-Taqi Mesbah-Yazdi, a former member of the Assembly of Experts on Leadership, said: "The issuance of this statement is perhaps one of the most difficult tasks that the Supreme Leader of the Revolution has done during his administration, and they have done it in the best possible way under normal circumstances for a human being. There is a lot more to be done about this statement and its elements, its goals, the interpretations they have used and the guidelines they have given."

== See also ==
- New Islamic Civilization
- (Seyyed Ali Khamenei's letter) "To the Youth in Western Countries"
- To the Youth in Europe and North America
