= Nuclear Fatwa Under International Law (book) =

2017 book about nuclear weapons

- Author: Jaber Seyvanizad
- Language: English
- Subject: "Determining the legal status and dimensions of the Supreme Leader's nuclear-fatwa" through international-law Characters
- Genre: Juridical
- Publisher: Supreme Century (California)
- Publication date: 2017
- Pages: 252

Nuclear Fatwa Under International Law (Persian: فتوای هسته‌ای از منظر حقوق بین‌الملل) is a juridical book by Jaber Seyvanizad, published by Supreme Century in 2017. Its subject is "Determining the legal status and dimensions of the Supreme Leader's nuclear-fatwa" through international law". Based on the fatwa (Islamic ruling) of the Supreme Leader of the Islamic Republic of Iran Seyyed Ali Khamenei, the use of nuclear weapons is forbidden.

Some items have a central role in the book, namely the "rulings of the International Court of Justice"; resolutions of the United Nations Commission on International Law; and the rules governing the formation of custom in international law.

== See also ==
- Ali Khamenei's fatwa against nuclear weapons
- Ali Khamenei bibliography
