= Nematullah Ghaffari =

Afghan politician

Afghanistan Parliament

Personal details
- Born: 1962 (age 63–64) Lashkargah, Helmand, Afghanistan
- Occupation: Politician

Nematullah Ghaffari (Dari: نعمت الله غفاری) is an Afghan politician who represented the Helmand province in the 15th and 16th terms of the Afghanistan Parliament.

== Early life ==
Nematullah Ghaffari was born in 1962 in Lashkargah, Helmand province. He completed his secondary education at "Lashkargah High School" in 1980 and obtained his diploma from Al-Mustafa International University in 1993 in Qom, Iran.

== See also ==
- List of Hazara people
