= New Islamic Civilization =

Iranian ideological concept

New Islamic Civilization (Persian: تمدن سازی نوین اسلامی) is a proposed concept for establishing a new civilization, called the ultimate purpose of Iranian Government related with the Second Phase of the Revolution introduced by the Office of the Supreme Leader of Iran. Supreme Leader Ali Khamenei discussed it on several occasions including the Islamic Unity Conference.

== Analysis ==
Characteristics of New Islamic Civilization from the perspective of the Supreme Leader include

1. The centrality of Quranic laws
2. Collective wisdom
3. Betterment of international relations

== See also ==
- Cultural engineering document
