= Khomeini's letter to Mikhail Gorbachev =

1989 letter from Iranian to Soviet leader

- Created: 7 January 1989
- Author: Ruhollah Khomeini
- Media type: Letter
- Subject: Invited Gorbachev to consider Islam as an alternative to communist ideology

On 7 January 1989, Ruhollah Khomeini, supreme leader of Iran, sent a letter to Mikhail Gorbachev, the General Secretary of the Communist Party of the Soviet Union. This letter was Khomeini's only written message to a foreign leader. Khomeini's letter was delivered by the Iranian politicians Abdollah Javadi Amoli, Mohammad-Javad Larijani, and Marzieh Hadidchi. In the letter, Khomeini declared that communism was dissolving within the Soviet bloc, and invited Gorbachev to consider Islam as an alternative to communist ideology.

== Letter to Gorbachev ==
Ruhollah Khomeini wrote to Mikhail Gorbachev on 3 January 1989. On 7 January, Khomeini's representatives, Abdollah Javadi Amoli, Mohammad-Javad Larijani, and Marzieh Hadidchi, went to Moscow to officially deliver the letter. Soviet officials met the Iranian delegation at the airport. Gorbachev then met with the Iranian representatives for approximately two hours, where an interpreter translated the letter for Mikhail Gorbachev and his colleagues. When some part of the letter was unclear, the interpreter asked the Iranian delegation to clarify. Gorbachev listened politely and took notes on its contents. The letter's contents were kept secret, and so Soviet officials did not know it was an invitation to consider Islam.

== Content ==
In his letter, Khomeini congratulated Gorbachev, saying he showed bravery in dealing with the modern world, and praised his reconstruction of Soviet principles. He suggested Islam as an alternative to communist ideology and recommended Muslim philosophers such as Ibn Arabi, Ibn Sina, and Al-Farabi. (Note: Attributed to multiple sources:)

The letter included a prediction about the end of Marxism and the collapse of communism. Khomeini stated: "Mr. Gorbachev! It is clear to everybody that from now on communism will only have to be found in the museums of world political history, for Marxism cannot meet any of the real needs of mankind. Marxism is a materialistic ideology and cannot bring humanity out of the crisis caused by a lack of belief in spirituality, the prime affliction of the human society in the East and the West alike." (Note: Attributed to multiple sources:) Khomeini warned Gorbachev "against falling into the arms of Western capitalism." Khomeini further added in the letter that: "The main problem confronting your country is not of private ownership, freedom and economy; your problem is the absence of true faith in God."

== Gorbachev's reaction ==
After hearing the text of the letter, Gorbachev thanked Ruhollah Khomeini for the letter and said: "I'll send an answer to this letter as soon as possible" and added, "we'll deliver [Khomeini's letter] to the Soviet clergymen". Referring to Khomeini's invitation to Islam, he said: "We are approving the law of religious freedom in the Soviet Union, I have claimed before that despite having different ideologies we can have a peaceful relationship". He then smiled and said: "Imam Khomeini invited us to Islam; do we have to invite him to our school of thought?" Then he added: "This invitation is an interference in the internal issue of a country because every country is free for selecting its school of thought".

After hearing Gorbachev's response, Ayatollah Amoli, the head of the Iranian representatives, thanked Gorbachev for his attention. He said: "...we appreciate the freedom of religion and hope for an amicable condition for all people to live with each other as they have different schools of thought. But the issue of interfering should be clarified. You are free in Russia to do what you want, and no one has the right to interfere in this realm. The content of the letter did nothing with materialism and the territory of Russia; it was just related to your souls".

In February 1989, Eduard Shevardnadze, Minister of Foreign Affairs of the Soviet Union, delivered Gorbachev's reply to Khomeini when he traveled to Iran.

== Controversy in Iran ==
The letter became controversial with Shiite clerics in the Iranian city of Qom who regarded the thoughts of Muslim mystics and philosophers to be heretical. In a letter to Khomeini they lamented why Khomeini needed to refer Gorbachev to "deviant," "heretical" and "Sunni" thinkers, arguing that the Quran was sufficient for supporting Islamic tenets. However, the letter was and continues to be celebrated by the Iranian government.

== Ali Khamenei's letter ==
Mohammad-Javad Larijani, a member of the Iranian delegation that transmitted Khomeini's letter, said: "...a message by Leader of the Islamic Revolution Ayatollah Seyyed Ali Khamenei addressed to the Western youth complements a 1989 letter written by late Imam Khomeini to former Soviet leader, Mikhail Gorbachev". He stated that Khomeini and Khamenei's letters (To the Youth in Europe and North America and To the Youth in Western Countries) invite people from the West to understand Islam.

== See also ==
- Predictions of the collapse of the Soviet Union
- To the Youth in Europe and North America (the letter of Iran's Supreme Leader, Ali Khamenei)
- To the Youth in Western Countries (the letter of Iran's Supreme Leader, Ali Khamenei)
- American Islam (term)
