= A 250 Years Old Person =

Book by Ali Khamenei

- The front cover of A 250 Years Old Person
- Authors: Ali Khamenei
- Original title: انسان ۲۵۰ ساله
- Translator: Ahl Al-Bayt World Assembly
- Language: Persian
- Published: 2014
- Publication place: Iran

A 250 Years Old Person (Persian: انسان ۲۵۰ ساله) is a book by Ali Khamenei, the former Supreme Leader of the Islamic Republic of Iran. Consisting of 17 chapters, it is a collection of his lectures on the political combats and struggles of Shia Imams.

== Author ==
Ali Khamenei was the Supreme Leader of the Islamic Republic of Iran from 1989 until 2026, after serving as president from 1981 until 1988. He was born in April 1939 in Mashhad, Iran. He studied Islamic courses at Qom under the dominant Shia Islam Marja' and scholars such as Ruhollah Khomeini, founder of the Iranian Revolution.

== Content ==
A 250 Years Old Person is a collection of lectures and writings of Ali Khamenei. It consists of 17 chapters. It starts with the life of Mohammad and ends with Hasan al-Askari, 11th Imam of Shia. The first three chapters are about the social and political situation of the Islamic Community, from the Day of Ashura to the spiritual leadership of Ja'far al-Sadiq. The main concepts of the book are the lifestyle of Imams and their aims in life. The period of 250 years is applied to the tenth lunar Hijri year (631 CE) until the Minor Occultation (874 CE). According to this book, Mohammad the prophet and the twelve Imams apparently had various methodologies in their lifestyles, but in whole they tried to reach one aim.

== Translation ==
According to the Tasnim News Agency, Ahl Al-Bayt World Assembly stated that the text has been published for the second time in the United States. It has also been translated into French and Swahili. In March 2015, the book was translated into Urdu in Karachi by "Khana Farhang Iran". The book is also translated into Hausa language.

== See also ==
- Ahl al-Bayt
- Early social changes under Islam
- To the Youth in Europe and North America (Letter)
- Letter4u (twitter hashtag)
- Khamenei's fatwa against nuclear weapon
- Palestine (2011 book)
- Islamic Government: Governance of the Jurist
- Tahrir al-Wasilah
- The Unveiling of Secrets
- Works of Seyyed Ali Khamenei
- Ruhe-Tawhid, Nafye Obudiate GheireKhoda (book)
