= Culture change =

Term in public policy

Culture change is a term used in public policy making and in workplaces that emphasizes the influence of cultural capital on individual and community behavior. It has been sometimes called repositioning of culture, which means the reconstruction of the cultural concept of a society. It places stress on the social and cultural capital determinants of decision making and the manner in which these interact with other factors like the availability of information or the financial incentives facing individuals to drive behavior.

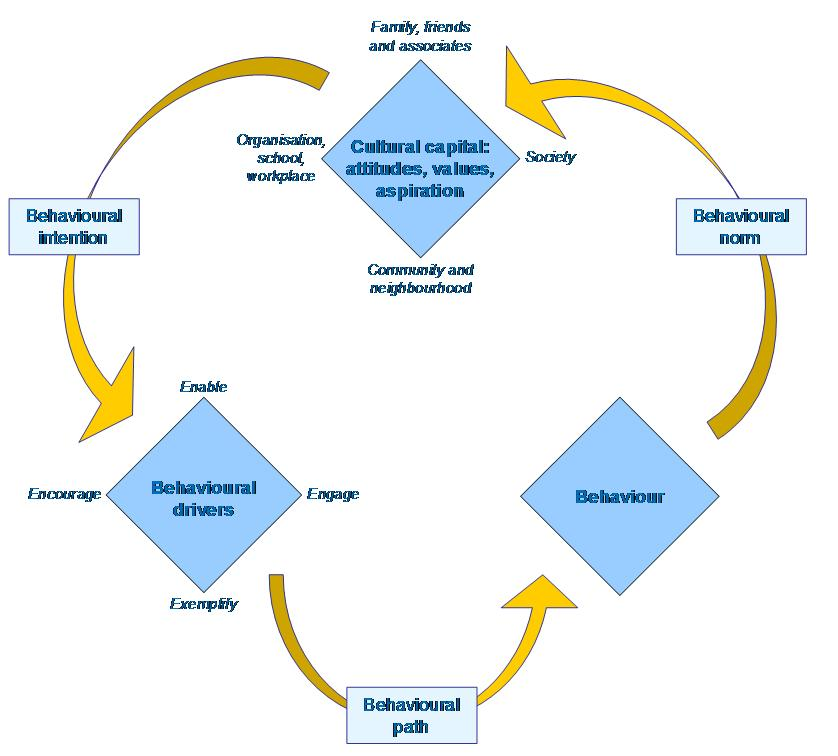
Model of culture change

These cultural capital influences include the role of parenting, families and close associates; organizations such as schools and workplaces; communities and neighborhoods; and wider social influences such as the media. It is argued that this cultural capital manifests into specific values, attitudes or social norms which in turn guide the behavioral intentions that individuals adopt in regard to particular decisions or courses of action. These behavioral intentions interact with other factors driving behavior such as financial incentives, regulation and legislation, or levels of information, to drive actual behavior and ultimately feed back into underlying cultural capital.

In general, cultural stereotypes present great resistance to change and to their own redefinition. Culture, often appears fixed to the observer at any one point in time because cultural mutations occur incrementally. Cultural change is a long-term process. Policymakers need to make a great effort to improve some basics aspects of a society's cultural traits.

== Culture ==
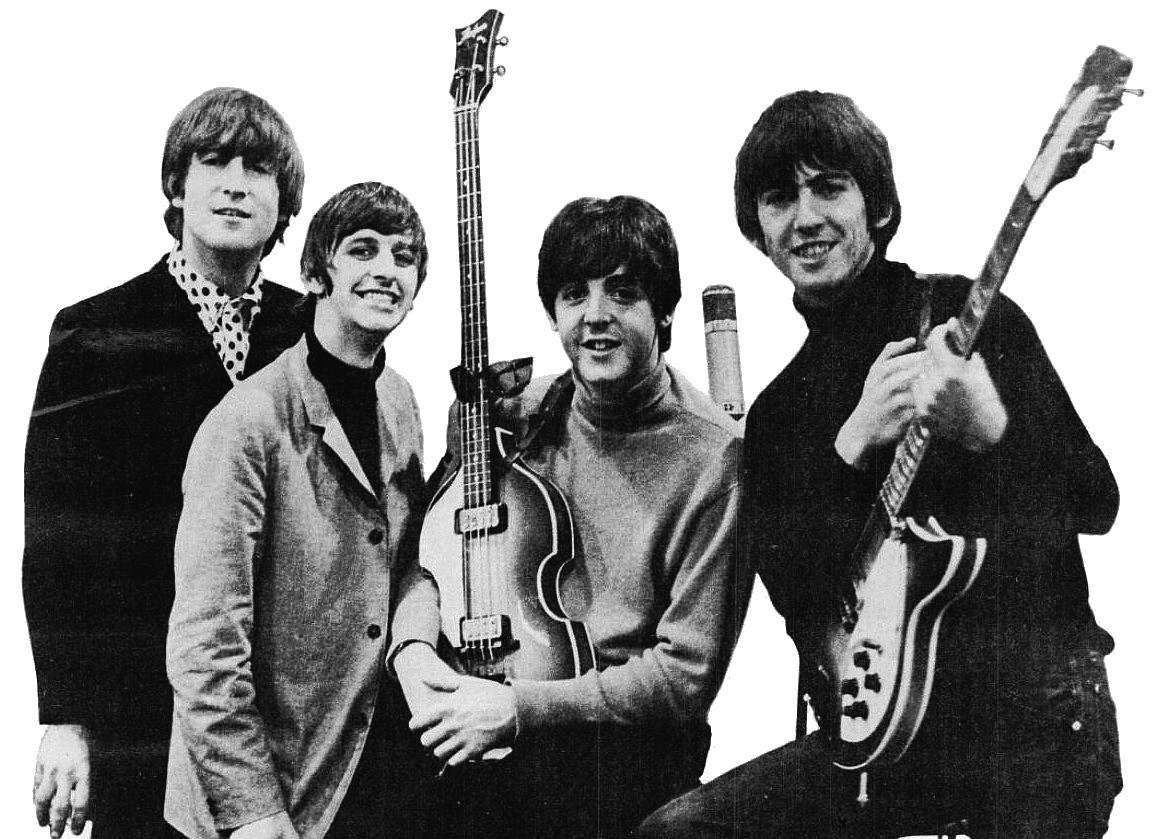
The Beatles are an example of changing cultural dynamics, including music, fashion, and lifestyle. Over a half century after their emergence, they continue to have a worldwide cultural impact.

Raimon Panikkar identified 29 ways in which cultural change can be brought about, including growth, development, evolution, involution, renovation, reconception, reform, innovation, revivalism, revolution, mutation, progress, diffusion, osmosis, borrowing, eclecticism, syncretism, modernization, nudging indigenization, and transformation. In this context, modernization could be viewed as adoption of Enlightenment era beliefs and practices, such as science, rationalism, industry, commerce, democracy, and the notion of progress. Rein Raud, building on the work of Umberto Eco, Pierre Bourdieu and Jeffrey C. Alexander, has proposed a model of cultural change based on claims and bids, which are judged by their cognitive adequacy and endorsed or not endorsed by the symbolic authority of the cultural community in question.

== Cultural invention ==
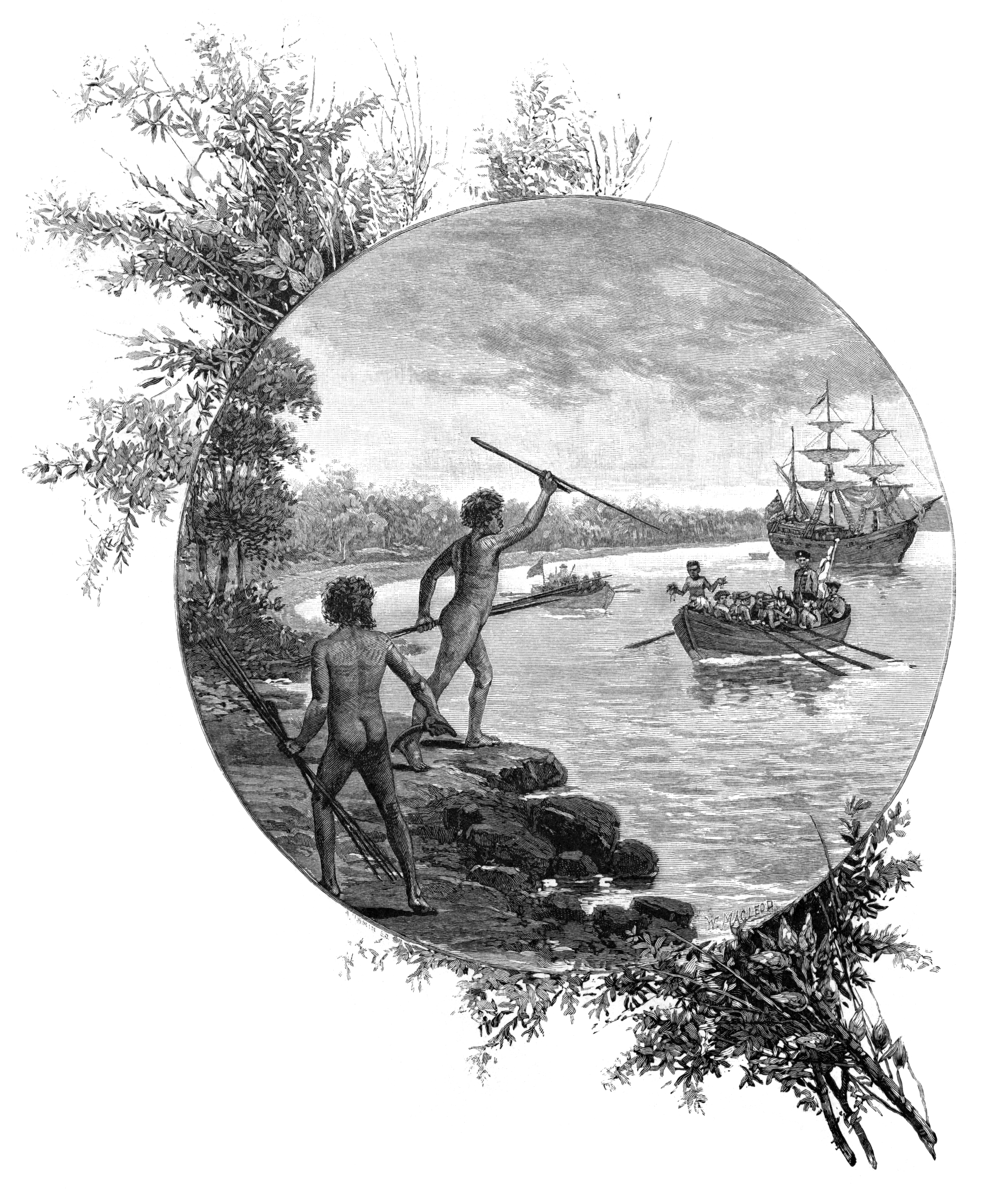
A 19th-century engraving showing Australian natives opposing the arrival of Captain James Cook in 1770

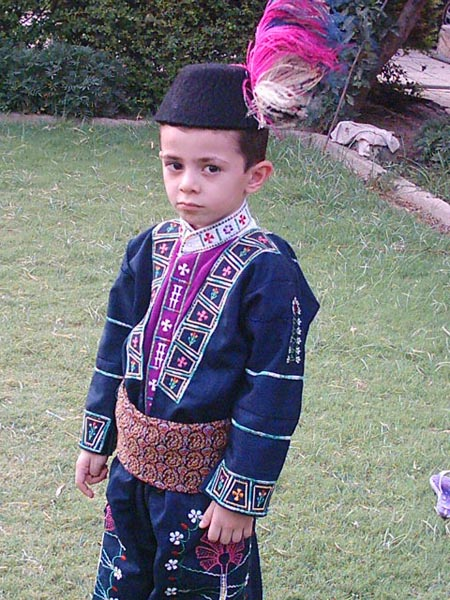
An Assyrian child wearing traditional clothing

Cultural invention has come to mean any innovation that is new and found to be useful to a group of people and expressed in their behavior but which does not exist as a physical object. Humanity is in a global "accelerating culture change period," driven by the expansion of international commerce, the mass media, and above all, the human population explosion, among other factors. Culture repositioning means the reconstruction of the cultural concept of a society.

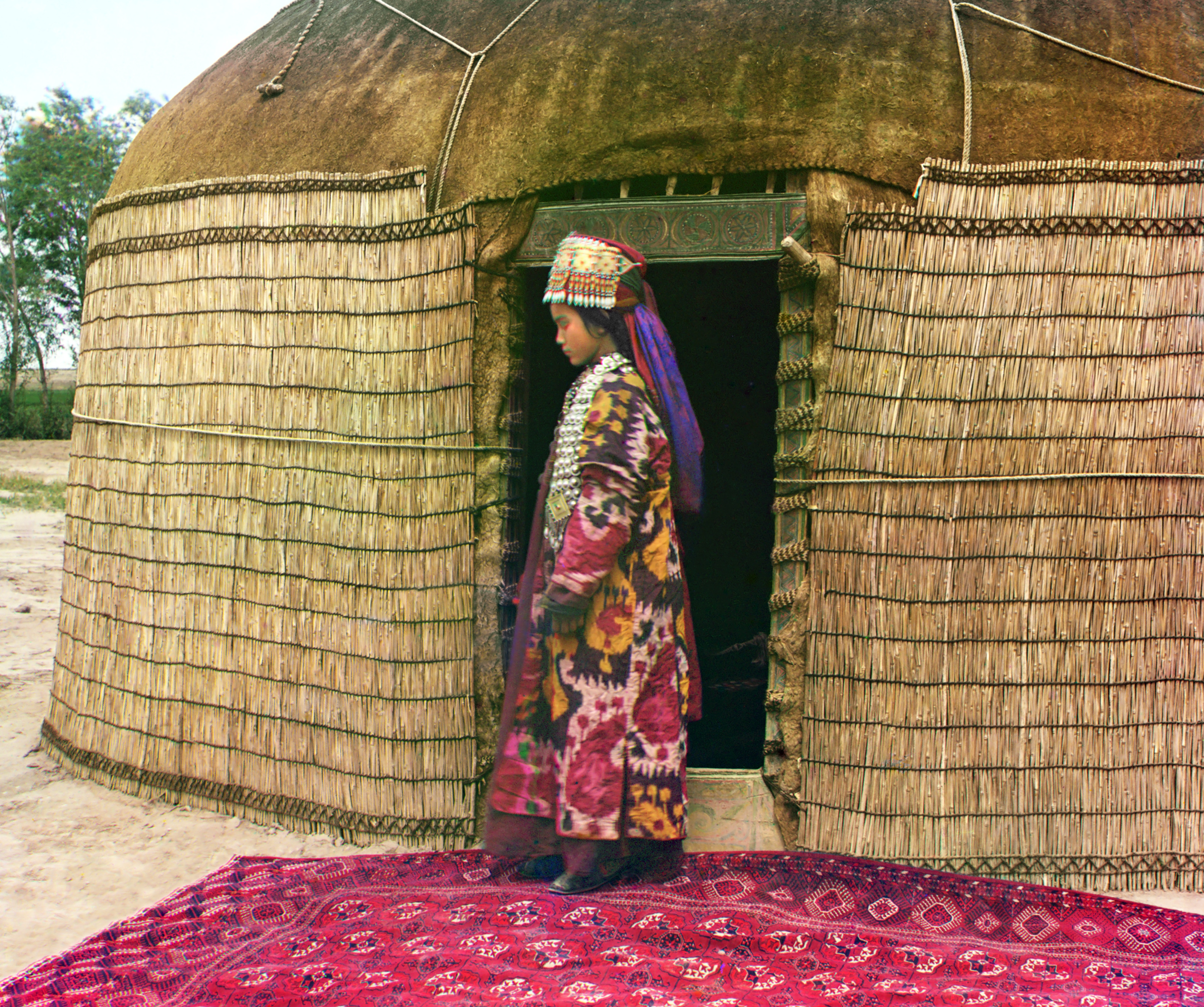
Full-length profile portrait of Turkman woman, standing on a carpet at the entrance to a yurt, dressed in traditional clothing and jewelry

Cultures are internally affected by both forces encouraging change and forces resisting change. These forces are related to both social structures and natural events, and are involved in the perpetuation of cultural ideas and practices within current structures, which themselves are subject to change. (See structuration.)

== Social conflict ==
Social conflict and the development of technologies can produce changes within a society by altering social dynamics and promoting new cultural models, and spurring or enabling generative action. These social shifts may accompany ideological shifts and other types of cultural change. For example, the U.S. feminist movement involved new practices that produced a shift in gender relations, altering both gender and economic structures. Environmental conditions may also enter as factors. For example, after tropical forests returned at the end of the last ice age, plants suitable for domestication were available, leading to the invention of agriculture, which in turn brought about many cultural innovations and shifts in social dynamics.

== Diffusion ==
Cultures are externally affected via contact between societies, which may also produce—or inhibit—social shifts and changes in cultural practices. War or competition over resources may impact technological development or social dynamics. Additionally, cultural ideas may transfer from one society to another, through diffusion or acculturation. In diffusion, the form of something (though not necessarily its meaning) moves from one culture to another. For example, Western restaurant chains and culinary brands sparked curiosity and fascination to the Chinese as China opened its economy to international trade in the late 20th-century. "Stimulus diffusion" (the sharing of ideas) refers to an element of one culture leading to an invention or propagation in another. "Direct borrowing," on the other hand, tends to refer to technological or tangible diffusion from one culture to another. Diffusion of innovations theory presents a research-based model of why and when individuals and cultures adopt new ideas, practices, and products.

== Acculturation ==
Acculturation has different meanings. Still, in this context, it refers to the replacement of traits of one culture with another, such as what happened to certain Native American tribes and many indigenous peoples across the globe during the process of colonization. Related processes on an individual level include assimilation (adoption of a different culture by an individual) and transculturation. The transnational flow of culture has played a major role in merging different cultures and sharing thoughts, ideas, and beliefs.

== Achieving culture change ==
The term is used by Knott et al. of the Prime Minister's Strategy Unit in their 2008 publication Achieving Culture Change: A Policy Framework. The paper sets out how public policy can achieve social and cultural change through 'downstream' interventions including fiscal incentives, legislation, regulation and information provision and also 'upstream' interventions such as parenting, peer and mentoring programs, or development of social and community networks.

The key concepts the paper is based on include:

- Cultural capital - such as the attitudes, values, aspirations and sense of self-efficacy which influence behavior. Cultural capital is itself influenced by behavior over time
- The shifting social zeitgeist - whereby social norms and values that predominate within the cultural capital in society evolve in over time
- The process by which political narrative and new ideas and innovations shift the social zeitgeist over time within the constraint of the 'elastic band' of public opinion
- The process of behavioral normalization - whereby behavior and actions pass through into social and cultural norms (for example, Knott et al. argue that the UK experience of seat belt enforcement established and reinforced this as a social norm)
- The use of customer insight
- The importance of tailoring policy programmes around an ecological model of human behavior to account for how policy will interact with cultural capital and affect it over time.
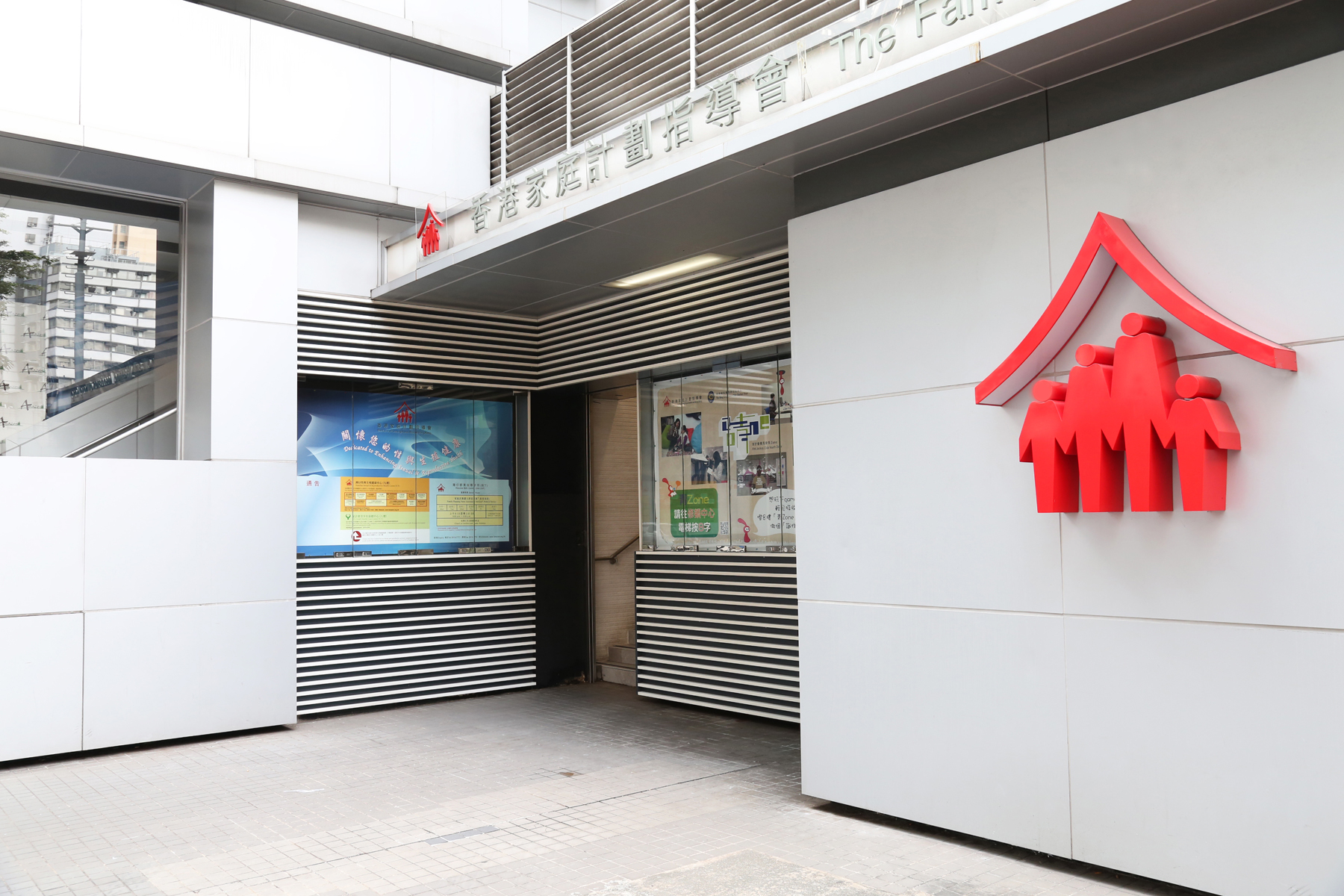
Family Planning clinic aimed at improving sexual health

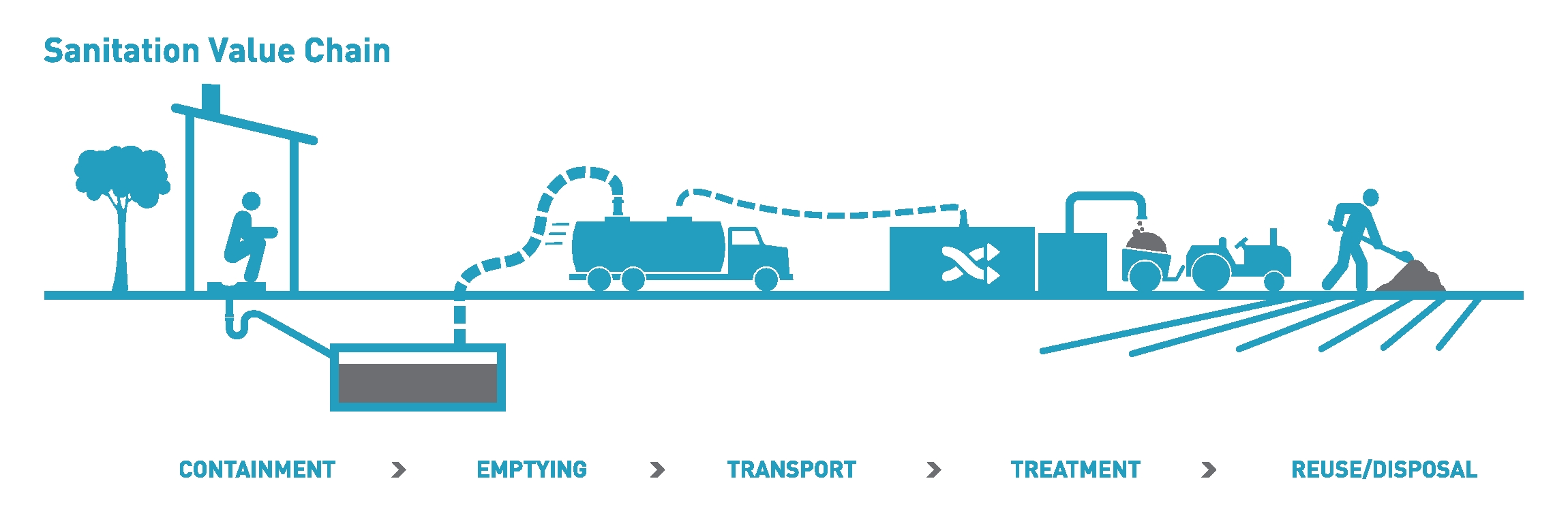
The Gates foundation proposes a financial incentive for waste management.

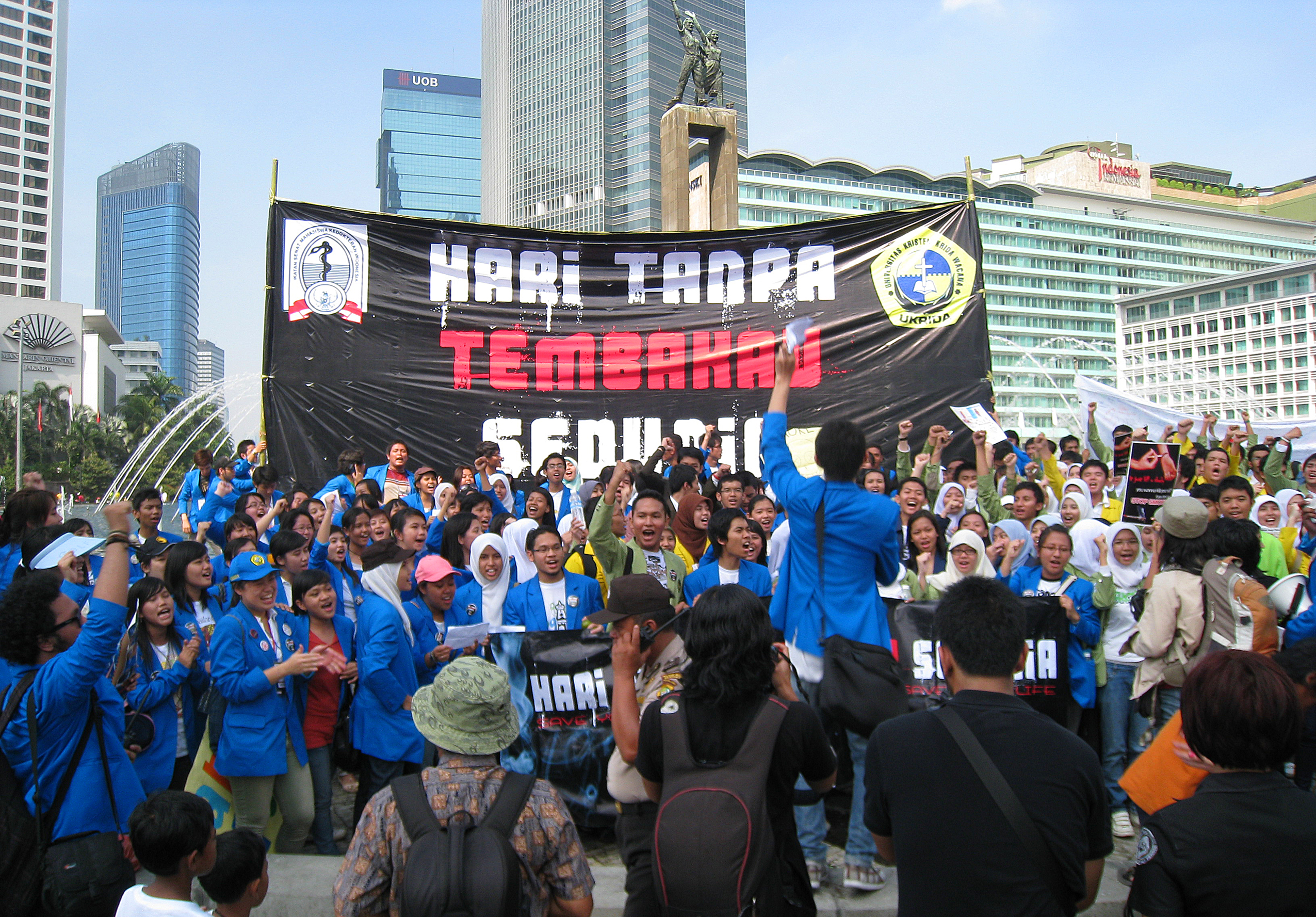
Anti-smoking campaign taken to the streets of Jakarta

Knott et al. use examples from a range of policy areas to demonstrate how the culture change framework can be applied to policymaking. for example:

- To encourage educational aspiration they recommend more use of early years and parenting interventions, an improved childhood offer, and development of positive narratives on education as well as integrated advisory systems, financial assistance and targeted social marketing approaches.
- To promote healthy living and personal responsibility they recommend building healthy living into community infrastructure, building partnerships with schools and employers, more one-to-one support for wellbeing alongside use of regulation and legislation on unhealthy products, provision of robust health information and health marketing to promote adaptive forms of behaviour.
- To develop environmentally sustainable norms they recommend reinforcing sustainability throughout policy narratives, using schools and the voluntary sector to promote environmental messages, development of infrastructure that make sustainable choices easy, together with a wider package of measures on fiscal incentives, regulation, advisory services and coalition movements.

== See also ==
- Behavioural economics – Factors influencing economic decisions
- Cultural capital – Concept of social status and social mobility
- Cultural economics – Branch of economics
- Cultural engineering document – 2013 Iranian cultural guidelines
- Cultural geography – Subfield within human geography
- Cultural psychology – How cultures reflect and shape their psychology
- Market failure – Inefficiently allocated markets
- Mediatization (media) – Process whereby the mass media influence other sectors of society
- Social change – Any significant alteration in societal order
- Social psychology – Study of social effects on people's thoughts, feelings, and behaviors
- Sociocultural evolution – Evolution of societies
- Structuration – Social theory proposed by Giddens that attempts to resolve the structure-agent debate
- Theory of planned behavior – Theory that links behavior and beliefs
- Cultural Revolution – Attempt at cultural change driven by a political revolution
