= An Outline of Islamic Thought in the Quran =

1974 book by Ali Khamenei

- Author: Ali Khamenei
- Subject: Quran
- Published: 1974
- Publisher: Office of Islamic Culture Publication

An Outline of Islamic Thought in the Quran (Persian: طرح کلی اندیشه اسلامی در قرآن) is the name of a book/work of Iran's former supreme leader, Ali Khamenei which was published in 1974 before the Iranian Revolution; and is a collection of (Khamenei's) copies, of his daily meetings (lectures) --at Imam Hassan Mosque in 1974—plus an introduction which was written by him before the publication of the book.

The introduction of the book "An Outline of Islamic Thought in the Quran" mentions the necessity of an outline presentation from Islamic thought based on Quran, and its goals and results.

This Persian book is considered as the fifth written work of Seyyed Ali Khamenei, and has been translated in Arabic/English, and is the outcome of twenty-eight consecutive sessions which were held in twenty eight days of Ramadan in 1974 by him.

Seyyed Ali Khamenei words concerning "An Outline of Islamic Thought in the Quran", is as follows:

The plan of Islam as a social ideology and with a coherent/coordinated principle(s) and providing to collective life of humans is one of the most urgent needs of religious thoughts. Before that, Islamic discussions and researches were mainly without these two significant traits; that's why, researchers and seekers have not obtained decisive fruitful results/judgement in comparison of Islam with schools/practitioners of this time.

== See also ==
- Works of Seyyed Ali Khamenei
- The 250 years old man (book)
- Ruhe-Tawhid, Nafye Obudiate GheireKhoda (book)
