= American Islam (term) =

Form of Islam alleged to be inauthentic

American Islam (Note: Persian: اسلام آمریکایی, Arabic: الإسلام الأمريكي) is a pejorative political term used by advocates of political Islam to describe an allegedly inauthentic form of Islam advocating separation of religion and state and lacking in anti-Americanism. The term was reportedly first used by Sayyid Qutb in 1952, an Islamist and prominent member of the Muslim Brotherhood. It is widely used in the Islamic Republic of Iran where its critics describe it as a type of Islam that is, among other things, indifferent to oppression, extravagance, encroachment on the rights of the oppressed, that helps the oppressors and the powerful, and emphasizes ceremonial Islam.

Ruhollah Khomeini, the leader and founder of the Islamic Republic, used the term describing it as "fake Islam", intended to deceive Muslims, preaching a separation of state and religion, that stands in opposition to "pure Mohammedan Islam". According to the late Supreme Leader of Iran, Seyyed Ali Khamenei, (speaking in 2010), "American Islam means ceremonial Islam, an Islam that is indifferent in the face of oppression."

== Background ==
At least according to the Iranian Fars News Agency, Sayyid Qutb, (Egyptian author, Islamist theorist), was the first one to use the phrase American Islam.

"Americans need Islam. They want an Islam that fights the communists in the Middle East, not an Islam that fights colonialism and autocracy. They don't want Islam to rule, because when the religion of Islam is ruled: it trains a nation for which it is obligatory to become strong and reject colonialism; Whether it is communist colonialism or American colonialism."

== American-religion (idiom) ==
In addition to this idiom ("American Islam"), Iran's first Supreme Leader, Ruhollah Khomeini used a similar idiom called "American-religion"; at 1989, he wrote a letter to Mikhail Gorbachev (known as Khomeini's letter to Mikhail Gorbachev). There, Khomeini mentions the expression of "American religion", and called it an "unreal religion".

On the other hand, Khomeini mostly referred to "pure and authentic Muhammadan Islam" which stood in sharp contradiction to "American Islam"; In his perception, "American-Islam" called for the separation of "religion and politics".

== Point of view ==
=== Khomeini ===
Seyed Ruhollah Khomeini called American Islam:

the Islam of capitalism, the Islam of the arrogant, the Islam of the wealthy without pain, the Islam of hypocrisy, the Islam of money and force, the Islam of the comfortable, the Islam of the opportunists, the Islam of the aristocracy, the Islam of Abu Sufyan, Islam of humiliation and misery, Islam of deception and compromise and captivity, Islam of capital and capitalists rule over the oppressed and barefoot, Islam of modern capitalism and vampire communism, Islam of prosperity and luxury, Islam of eclecticism, etc.

=== Khamenei ===
According to Seyyed Ali Khamenei:

American Islam, although it has an Islamic appearance and name --but-- it submits to tyranny and Zionism (it does not resist them); it accepts the reign of the arrogant; and completely serves the goals of the tyranny and America.

== See also ==
- Americanism (heresy), a similar concept in Catholicism
- European Islam
- Islam in the United States
- Great Satan
- Iran–United States relations
