= Fatwa against nuclear weapons =

Iranian policy statement by Ali Khamenei

A fatwa by Ali Khamenei, then supreme leader of Iran, against the development of nuclear weapons dates back to the mid-1990s. The first public announcement is reported to have occurred in October 2003, followed by an official statement at a meeting of the International Atomic Energy Agency (IAEA) in Vienna, Austria, in August 2005.

Some analysts have questioned either the existence, applicability and/or constancy of the fatwa. According to Mehdi Khalaji, Khamenei may alter his fatwa under critical circumstances, as did his predecessor, Ruhollah Khomeini, on some civil and political issues. According to Gareth Porter writing in Foreign Policy, Iran's aversion to nuclear and chemical weapons is sincere because of the "historical episode during its eight-year war with Iraq", and Iran never sought revenge for Iraqi chemical attacks against Iran, which killed 20,000 Iranians and severely injured 100,000 more. According to Khalaji, the fatwa is also considered to be consistent with Islamic tradition.

As an Istifta'at (Note: Istiftā' means a proposed fatwa) the policy is included on Khamenei's official website, and was referred to in remarks by both U.S. president Barack Obama and Khamenei himself.

== Background ==
According to Gareth Porter, the fatwa was issued for the first time in the mid-1990s in a letter that was never publicly released. The fatwa was issued "without any fanfare" responding to a request from an official "for his religious opinion on nuclear weapons".

In October 2003, Khamenei issued an oral fatwa that forbade the production and use of any form of weapon of mass destruction. Two years later, in August 2005, the fatwa was cited in an official statement by the Iranian government at a meeting of the International Atomic Energy Agency (IAEA) in Vienna. It stated that the production, stockpiling and use of nuclear weapons were forbidden under Islam.

Iran's nuclear program has been a subject of international debate for decades. The Iranian government claims that the purpose of its nuclear development is to produce electricity, and Khamenei said that it fundamentally rejects nuclear weapons, but experts believe that Iran is technically able to enrich uranium for producing a bomb within a few months.

Four days after the Joint Comprehensive Plan of Action (JCPOA) agreement, Khamenei delivered a speech, highlighting his fatwa and rejecting the claim that the nuclear talks, rather than Iran's religious abstinence, prevented Iran from acquiring nuclear weapons:

The Americans say they stopped Iran from acquiring a nuclear weapon. They know it's not true. We had a fatwa (religious ruling), declaring nuclear weapons to be religiously forbidden under Islamic law. It had nothing to do with the nuclear talks.

== Official statements ==
The Iranian official website for information on its nuclear program has provided numerous instances of public statements by Khamenei in which he voices his opposition to pursuit and development of nuclear weapons in moral, religious and Islamic juridical terms. Khamenei's official website specifically cites a 2010 version of those statements in the fatwa section of the website in Farsi as a fatwa on "Prohibition of Weapons of Mass Destruction":

We believe that besides nuclear weapons, other types of weapons of mass destruction such as chemical and biological weapons also pose a serious threat to humanity. The Iranian nation which is itself a victim of chemical weapons feels more than any other nation the danger that is caused by the production and stockpiling of such weapons and is prepared to make use of all its facilities to counter such threats. We consider the use of such weapons as haraam and believe that it is everyone's duty to make efforts to secure humanity against this great disaster.

Also, he said during a speech delivered on 9 April 2015 in a meeting with a group of panegyrists:

This is while (sic) we are not after nuclear tests. We are not after nuclear weapons. And this is not because they are telling us not to pursue these things. Rather, we do not want these things for the sake of ourselves and our religion and because reason is telling us not to do so. Both shar'i and aqli [related to logic and reason] fatwas dictate that we do not pursue them. Our aqli fatwa is that we do not need a nuclear weapon either in the present time or in the future. A nuclear weapon is a source of trouble for a country like ours.

=== Developments in 2020s ===
In 2021, acknowledging the fatwa, Iranian intelligence minister Esmaeil Khatib said that the country may nevertheless change their stance if "pushed in that direction" like a "cornered cat". During a February 2025 meeting between Khamenei and the IRGC, commanders pressured Khamenei to rescind his ban on nuclear weapons. In March 2025, Khamenei's advisor Ali Larijani said Iran would have no choice but to develop nuclear weapons if attacked by the United States or its allies. However, in September 2026, following the assassination of Khamenei and 2026 Iran war, Iranian President Masoud Pezeshkian reiterated that nuclear weapons were haram.

== Reception ==
The fatwa has been widely discussed by international officials and was referred to in remarks by U.S. president Barack Obama.

In a statement on a conversation with Hasan Rouhani, Obama said:

Iran's supreme leader has issued a fatwa against the development of nuclear weapons.

A similar statement is quoted from John Kerry, saying:

So I close by saying to all of you that the singular objective that brought us to Geneva remains our singular objective as we leave Geneva, and that is to ensure that Iran does not acquire a nuclear weapon. In that singular object, we are resolute. Foreign Minister [Mohammad Javad] Zarif emphasized that they don't intend to do this, and the supreme leader has indicated there is a fatwa, which forbids them to do this.

The fatwa is regarded as consistent with a set of rules in Islamic tradition that prohibit weapons that indiscriminately kill women, children and the elderly.

== Analysis ==
Questions have been raised by some think tanks on the fatwa's existence, authenticity and impact and on whether it was only a political statement that lacks the authority of a religiously binding fatwa. James Risen of The New York Times noted that Khamenei said "that it was a mistake for Col. Muammar el-Qaddafi of Libya to give up his nuclear weapons program". Some analysts raised the possibility that Khamenei might be lying by using taqiyya, which is a form of religious dissembling. In 2015, an open letter to Obama, posted on Iranian.com, reportedly from a nephew of Ali Khamenei, stated that Khamenei practiced taqiyya with regard to the fatwa. Gholam-Hossein Elham, an Iranian politician, argues that taqiya does not apply here because the fatwa by Khamenei is a primary religious order, not a secondary one. According to him, Khamenei's fatwa bans massacre of innocent people; that is not going to change in any situation since it is a primary order. Also, he said that Islamic jurists have banned deception in jihad and war, which are Islamic leaders he respects. On November 1, 2015, The Jerusalem Post also noted that the fatwa came after President Akbar Hashemi Rafsanjani had admitted the nuclear option was explored and referred to it in an interview. However, according to the Iranian nuclear hope website, Rafsanjani's interview, when it was initially published, was "skewed by Zionist media", and Rafsanjani said that "there was no reason to go toward the military aspect of nuclear issues, we did not want to build nuclear weapons."

According to Abbas Milani, whether the fatwa "actually exists and even whether Mr. Khamenei is entitled to issue fatwas and finally how changeable are fatwas are all contested matters". While Seyyed Hossein Mousavian, head of the Iranian Foreign Relations Committee from 1997 to 2005 and a research scholar at Princeton University, recalls seeing the letter containing the anti-nuclear fatwa issued in the mid-1990s in office of the Iranian Supreme National Security Council, Karim Sadjadpour argues that the references to the fatwa by the US government may be done to give the Iranians a route to compromise on the basis of religious beliefs rather than pressure from US-led sanctions.

According to Khalaji, a senior fellow at the Washington Institute for Near East Policy, "fatwas are issued in response to specific circumstances and can be altered in response to changing conditions". He argued that Khomeini altered some of his former viewpoints on issues such as taxes, military conscription, women's suffrage and monarchy as a form of government and so Khamenei may likewise modify supplanting his nuclear fatwa under critical circumstances. Similarly, Michael Eisenstadt argued that Khamenei may have issued the fatwa to reduce the international pressure on Iran and that "no religious principle would prevent Khamenei from modifying or supplanting his initial fatwa if circumstances were to change" and "expediency/interest of the regime (maslahat) so required".

Gareth Porter argues that "the analysis of Khamenei's fatwa has been flawed", not only because the role of the "guardian jurist" in the Iranian political-legal system is not totally understood but also because the history of the fatwa is ignored. He also believes that to understand Iranian policy toward nuclear weapons, one should refer to the "historical episode during its eight-year war with Iraq", which explains why Iran never used chemical weapons against Iraq seeking revenge for Iraqis attacks killing 20,000 Iranians and severely injured 100,000 more. Porter argues that fact to suggest strongly that Iran has sincerely made a "deep-rooted" ban on developing chemical and nuclear weapons. In an interview with Porter, Mohsen Rafighdoost, the eight-year wartime minister of the Islamic Revolutionary Guard Corps, disclosed how Khomeini had opposed his proposal for beginning working on both nuclear and chemical weapons by a fatwa. The details on when and how it was issued had never been made public.

Iranian politician Ali Motahari said the fatwa only forbids the use of a nuclear weapon, not its creation.

== See also ==
- Anti-nuclear movement in the United States
- History of nuclear weapons
- Ja'fari jurisprudence
- List of fatwas
- Nuclear weapons and the United States
- Marja' Taqlid
- Second Phase of the Revolution
- (Seyyed Ali Khamenei's letter) "To the Youth in Western Countries"
