= Cultural engineering document =

2013 Iranian cultural guidelines

- Location: Iran
- Author(s): Supreme leader of Iran, Saied Reza Ameli
- Purpose: Culture change

Cultural engineering document (Persian: سند مهندسی فرهنگی) is the 2013 protocols set for reshaping future of Iranian culture by the Supreme Council of Cultural Revolution of the Iranian government. Three main levels of culture in this document are Iranian-Islamic culture (national culture), peoples culture and professional culture (teachers, businessmen, clerics, politicians, doctors, judges, etc.). This document is based on Iran 2025 document(national engineering document), and is divided into national and provincial (or multiple provinces) programs. Its subjects include citizens, agencies, Persian language societies, Islamic world, regional countries, nations with strong ties to Islamic republic government, enemies of the Islamic republic government, international organizations and global community.

== Topics ==
Human values defined in this document include

Islamic thought, political wisdom, social vision, halal living, Tawhid of faith, Velayate faqih, justice, etc.

Hijab is defined a cultural priority in this document.

== See also ==
- New Islamic Civilization
