= Cultural Revolution (disambiguation) =

Cultural Revolution is the common name for the sociopolitical movement in the People's Republic of China that took place between 1966 and 1976.

It may also refer to:

- Cultural Revolution in the Soviet Union, in the late 1920s and early 1930s
- Cultural Revolution in Albania, in the late 1960s
- Cultural Revolution in Libya, in the 1970s
- Cultural Revolution in Iran, in the early 1980s
- Democratic and Cultural Revolution, the political program implemented in Bolivia during the presidency of Evo Morales

== See also ==
- July Theses
- Communist Party of Burma § The CPB's "Cultural Revolution" (1964–1968)
