= Ruhe-Tawhid, Nafye Obudiate GheireKhoda =

1977 book by Seyyed Ali Khamenei

Ruhe-Tawhid, Nafye Obudiate GheireKhoda (i.e.: The Spirit of Tawhid [Monotheism], Rejection of non-God Obedience) (Persian: روح توحید، نفی عبودیت غیر خدا) is the name of a book/article from Iran's supreme leader, Seyyed Ali Khamenei (Persian: سید علی خامنه ای), which was published in 1977 for the first time. This book was provided by him in response to a student's question and likewise to a query which was asked: “What is the practical role of believing in Tawhid, in the human life?”.

The topic of Ruhe-Tawhid, Nafye Obudiate GheireKhoda is also the name of a chapter in the book Tarhe-Kolie Andishe-Islami in Quran (i.e. General plan of Islamic thoughts in the Quran); and its contents are the matters of that chapter but in a vaster volume. Seyyed Ali Khamenei has utilized 78 Tawhidi-related verses of the Quran in the mentioned article.

Ruhe-Tawhid, Nafye Obudiate GheireKhoda, --apart from being an article-- has been published as a separate book by "Islamic publications" --relating to Society of Seminary Teachers of Qom. And is known as the most Quranic article of «Monotheism perspective» (book), that was written in the handwriting of Seyyed Ali Khamenei, and has been published in the book of "Monotheistic Perspective" besides four other articles (of other scholars/scientists).

== See also ==
- Works of Seyyed Ali Khamenei
- The 250 years old man
- Palestine (2011 book)
