= To the Youth in Western Countries =

Book by Ali Khamenei

On 29 November 2015, Ali Khamenei, then Supreme Leader of Iran, published an open letter addressed to the youth in Western countries. It is the second letter of its kind, the first one having been published in January 2015. Both were distributed via his accounts on various social media, including Twitter, Facebook and Instagram, using the hashtag #CommonWorry. The second letter deals with Khamenei's views on the causes of recent terrorism. It was written in response to the November 2015 Paris attacks and other contemporary terrorist actions, such as the Metrojet Flight 9268 crash and the 2015 Beirut bombings. As of December 26, 2015, the letter has been translated to 62 languages in a collaborative effort conducted by his representative in the University of Mohaghegh Ardabili, Al-Mustafa International University graduates, the Ministry of Foreign Affairs, the IRIB World Service and the countries' respective embassies.

== Contents ==
In about two thousand words, Khamenei discussed the reasons for the worldwide wave of terrorism, calling it "our common worry". Among them he noted the impact that major Western powers had with their military operations in the Islamic world. He mentioned the United States's alleged role in the evolution of terrorist groups like al-Qaeda, the Taliban, and ISIL—"the spawn of such ill-fated pairings with imported cultures."

Khamenei also pointed out the "oppressed people of Palestine", who "have experienced the worst kind of terrorism for the last 60 years." For this, he criticised Israel, its allies and international organisations.

== Twitter ==
Twitter accounts that tweeted the letter were reported to have been temporarily suspended for sending spam messages. Some were reactivated with apologies from the network and a warning about sending similar messages again. This sometimes led to multiple re-suspensions.

== See also ==
- To the Youth in Europe and North America, Khamenei's first letter addressed to the Western youth.
- Ruhollah Khomeini's letter to Mikhail Gorbachev
- Seyyed Ali Khamenei bibliography
- Ayatollah Khamenei's letter to students at U.S. universities
