= Palestine (2011 book) =

Book by Ali Khamenei

- Palestine book front cover
- Editor: Saeed Solh-Mirzai
- Author: Ayatollah Ali Khamenei
- Original title: فلسطین از منظر آیت الله خامنه‌ای lit. Palestine from the Perspective of Ayatollah Khamenei
- Language: Persian
- Published: 2011 Islamic Revolution Publication
- Publication place: Iran
- Pages: 416
- ISBN: 978-964-2951-02-4

Palestine from the Perspective of Ayatollah Khamenei (Persian: فلسطین از منظر آیت‌الله خامنه‌ای, romanized: Felestin az Manzar-e Âyatollâh Khâmene'i) is a 2011 book excerpting many statements of Iranian Supreme Leader Ayatollah Ali Khamenei about Palestine and Israel. The book consists of 8 chapters and 416 pages in Persian. It is currently available in Iran only, while an Arabic translation is promised.

A condensed 104-page paperback (also online) all-English version is entitled on the front cover as: "Palestine: Selected Statements by Ayatollah Khamenei About Palestine" but on its Title Page the title is slightly revised as: "The Most Important Problem of the Islamic World: Selected Statements by Ayatollah Khamenei About Palestine", ISBN 978-964-2951-40-6; published by: "Moasseseh Pajooheshi Farhangi Enqlab Eslami".

According to the New York Post, the book opposes the Jewish state. Khamenei claims that his strategy for the "liberation of Palestine" is based on "well-established Islamic principles".

== Contents ==
Palestine consists of 8 chapters:

1. General
2. Failures and Victories
3. Responsibilities
4. Crimes
5. Solutions
6. Heroes
7. Enlightenment
8. Bright Future

It also includes the Friday prayer sermons delivered on 8 August 1980. The introduction was written by Ali Akbar Velayati, Khamenei's consultant in international affairs.

Khamenei claims that anti-Semitism is "a European phenomenon" and that his own opposition is based on "well-established Islamic principles", including the idea that any lands ever held under any form of Muslim rule can never be yielded to other faiths. Although such a policy also covers India and large parts of Russia, Europe, China, and Southeast Asia, Khamenei asserts that Israel is a special case—an "ally of the American Great Satan" in an "evil scheme" to dominate "the heartland of the Ummah".

A note on the book jacket describes Khamenei as the "flag bearer of Jihad to liberate Jerusalem". Khamenei emphasizes that he does not recommend "classical wars" or desire to "massacre the Jews". Instead, he advises "a long period of low-intensity warfare" making life "unpleasant if not impossible" for a majority of Israeli Jews, ultimately causing them to leave the country.

== Reception ==
According to Amir Taheri, the book is anti-Israeli, describing the Jewish state as an "enemy" (adou & doshman), a "hostile infidel" (kaffir al-harbi), and a "cancerous tumor".

== Reactions ==
Israel: Addressing a 2015 UN General Assembly meeting in New York, Israeli Prime Minister Benjamin Netanyahu held up a copy of the book and said it was a "400-page screed detailing [the Ayatollah's] plan to destroy the state of Israel".
