= To the Youth in Europe and North America =

2015 open letter by Ayatollah Khamenei

"To the Youth in Europe and North America" is an online open letter written on 21 January 2015 by Iran's Supreme Leader, Ayatollah Ali Khamenei. According to Al-Monitor, it may be the first time that young people in the West have been directly addressed by a senior Muslim cleric about his religion.

Prompted by the Charlie Hebdo shooting in Paris on 7 January 2015 by militants who said that they had acted in the name of religion, and writing about the current perception of Islam in the West, Khamenei released the letter on his official website. It was also promoted via a Twitter account attributed to him. Khamenei appeals to his audience to have an open mind and not to judge Islam based on recent events, and implores Western youth to learn about Islam from its original sources, rather than have it "introduced to [them] by prejudices" and anti-Muslim sentiment. In his letter he writes that he does not insist that young people accept his or any particular reading of Islam, but that he wants young people not to "allow this dynamic and effective reality in today's world to be introduced to [them] through resentments and prejudices".

A second open letter was written by Khamenei on 29 November 2015, following the November 2015 Paris shooting.

== Content ==
=== Message to youth ===
Khamenei says that his letter, written in English, is addressed to young people who may still have open minds, not to Western leaders who, he writes, intentionally distort the truth. "I am addressing you, [the youth], not because I overlook your parents", but because "the future of your nations and countries will be in your hands; and also I find that the sense of quest for truth is more vigorous and attentive in your hearts". He further writes: "I don't insist that you accept my reading or any other reading of Islam. What I want to say is: Don't allow this dynamic and effective reality in today's world to be introduced to you through resentments and prejudices."

He states his admiration for Western historians who, in his words, are "deeply ashamed of the bloodsheds wrought in the name of religion between the Catholics and Protestants or in the name of nationality and ethnicity during the First and Second World Wars". The question Khamenei asks here is why Western public awareness is focused on the distant past, "but not [on] current problems". He asks, "Why is it that attempts are made to prevent public awareness regarding an important issue such as the treatment of Islamic culture and thought?"

This question leads him to the main issue that he wishes to communicate to young people: "Hence, my first request is: Study and research the incentives behind this widespread tarnishing of the image of Islam." As part of this, he advises young people to read the Qur'an for themselves. "Have you studied the teachings of the Prophet of Islam and his humane, ethical doctrines? Have you ever received the message of Islam from any sources other than the media?", he asks.

=== Criticizing Islamophobia ===
Khamenei claims that Western countries are responsible for the creation of the so-called Islamic State, a violent militant group. He also often accuses the Western media of trying to stir up sectarian conflict between Shiites and Sunnis. According to CNN, while "chants of 'Death to America' have been a familiar refrain at Friday prayers and parliamentary sessions since the Islamic republic's founding in 1979," the leader strikes a more conciliatory tone in the letter, writing: "Don't allow them [western countries] to hypocritically introduce their own recruited terrorists as representatives of Islam". That is part of a persisting trend that, he said, started after the disintegration of the Soviet Union. "This is a preplanned challenge between Islam and you," he wrote, a twenty-year-long effort "to place this great religion in the seat of a horrifying enemy".

"Why does the power structure in the world want Islamic thought to be marginalized and remain latent?" he asks the youth. "What concepts and values in Islam disturb the programs of the super powers and what interests are safeguarded in the shadow of distorting the image of Islam?"

== Promotion ==
Radio Zamaneh stated that 80 "cultural representatives and advisers have been mobilized by Iran’s Islamic Culture and Relations Organization to travel to European and North American countries to promote a message from Iran’s Supreme Leader among the youth there". The Islamic Culture and Relations Organization also translated the letter into 21 languages. Mohammad Javad Zarif, the Foreign Minister of Iran, delivered a copy of the letter to UN Secretary-General Ban Ki-moon. Al-Mustafa International University created a website with the letter and translation in various languages along with feedback and reactions from youth in different countries. Holly Dagres of Al-Monitor, commenting on the promotion of the letter by Khamenei's supporters on Instagram, wrote:

Ayatollah Khamenei’s followers in the virtual and literal sense — through #Letter4u — actively spammed Facebook, Instagram, Twitter, Google+ and even Tumblr with links and short messages that pose questions such as: "Searching for the truth? Then #Letter4u is what you might want to read first," or "Do you know the leader of iran have written a letter for you??" — all with the aim to garner the attention of people in the West.

On 16 March 2015, the University of Tehran and Press TV held a conference in Tehran on Khamenei's letter called "Seeking the Truth.

The letter is translated into Russian and distributed among people in the Moscow book fair.

== Reception of the letter ==
Foreign Policy magazine wrote that "So far, the dozen-something tweets with the hashtag #Letter4U from Khamenei's official account have received several dozen retweets and likes, but none have gone viral".

Karim Sadjadpour, a senior Iran analyst at the Carnegie Endowment for International Peace, said that the letter is revealing of Khamenei's "outsized confidence, dogmatic worldview, and victimization complex".

Esfandyar Batmanghelidj commented at the Europe-Iran Forum that it is unprecedented for Khamenei to address western youth in an open letter, however the strangest thing is that he speaks against dogma in his letter saying "I don't insist that you accept my reading or any other reading of Islam", while his country, Iran, is not famous for free speech. He released his letter on Twitter, a website which has been blocked in Iran since the presidential election in 2009, when people used the website to raise their protests. It seems Khamenei, himself, is aware of the contradiction, as he writes the letter from the standpoint of a scholar and not a leader. After the Iranian Revolution "cultural battles between reformists and traditionalists" have always been a serious problem in Iran through which Khamenei has gained the experience that intellectuals are better able to solve problems than leaders. It took Iran's leader a great breakthrough to realize that the conflict between Islamic Iran and the west was not fundamental and inevitable, but epistemological and solvable.

American conservative pundit Michael L. Brown wrote a response letter to Khamenei. He praised the leader for using modern technology and attempting to bring harmony between civilizations, but also accused him of trying to stoke division between generations in the West. He went on to write "Your [sic] are concerned about Islamophobia writing, "I would like you to ask yourself why the old policy of spreading 'phobia' and hatred has targeted Islam and Muslims with an unprecedented intensity." The answer, respected sir, is that our people and our buildings have been blown up by religious Muslims and our citizens have been beheaded by devout followers of Islam." He then cites violent actions by groups such as the Taliban, Boko Haram, Al-Qaeda, ISIS and Hamas as being responsible for Islamophobia.

Journalist Kate Zavadski of New York magazine wrote that "The open letter ends on a note of hope – perhaps foreshadowing the end of decades of "clash of civilizations" scholarship on Islam and the West."

Bruce Laingen, an American diplomat and former chargé d'affaires of the United States Embassy in Iran, responded that "The ayatollah appears to have conveniently forgotten his personal role and that of his entire regime in the treatment of the American hostages in the hostage crisis of 1979–81."

James S. Robbins commented in The National Interest that in his letter Khamenei "maintained that the view of Islam most young people receive is filtered through hostile governments and negative press reports." He laments that "the White House is making little effort to promote the cause of freedom among Iran's youth."

Jordan Valinsky of Mic commented that "Perhaps his letter should have been addressed to Western media rather than Western youths: American cable news networks are routinely embarrassing themselves with "experts" and lines of guests who reinforce the "us vs. them" division between the West and the entire Muslim world after successive atrocities committed by Islamic militants."

Charles Taliaferro, a professor at St. Olaf College, stated that "The more this message can be spread and interpreted as condemning both the caricature and false portrait of Islam as well as interpreted as a clear condemnation of those who commit cruel, wrongful acts in the name of Islam, the greater the success of Islam among the people of the West.

Elif Koc of Mashable commented that "In a country notorious for its limitations on freedom of speech, Twitter is blocked, but Khamenei's office maintains a Twitter presence. Other Twitter users relayed messages to Khamenei highlighting the limitations of Iran's own policies on free speech using #LETTER4U. One shared a personal anecdote about his father. 'Dear Youth!, My dad spent 5 years in jail for just telling the guy who wrote you a letter he is a dictator #Letter4U.'"

== See also ==
- "A Common Word Between Us and You", a 2007 letter by Muslim leaders to their Christian counterparts.
- "To the Youth in Western Countries"
- Ruhollah Khomeini's letter to Mikhail Gorbachev
- Ali Khamenei bibliography
- Ayatollah Khamenei's letter to students at U.S. universities
