= Al-Mustafa International University =

University in Qom, Iran

- Established: 1979
- Location: Qom, Iran: Branches in Iran; International branches
- Website: https://miu.ac.ir/
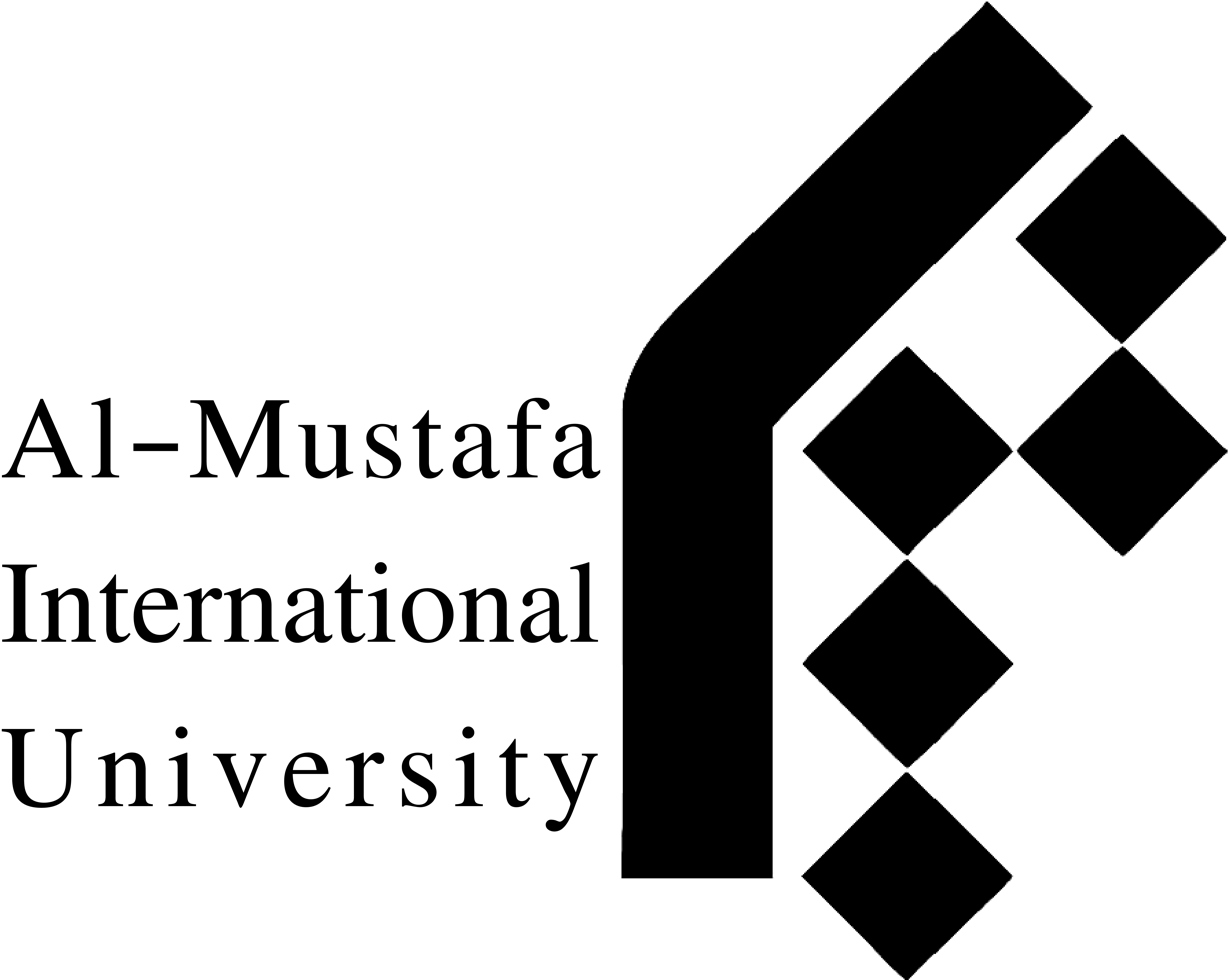

Al-Mustafa International University (MIU) (Arabic: جامعة المصطفىٰ العالمية; Persian: جامعه المصطفی العالمیه, Jam'h-e Almistâfi-ye Al'alâmih) is an international academic, Islamic and university-style seminary institute in Qom, Iran, established in 1979. It has international branches and affiliate schools.

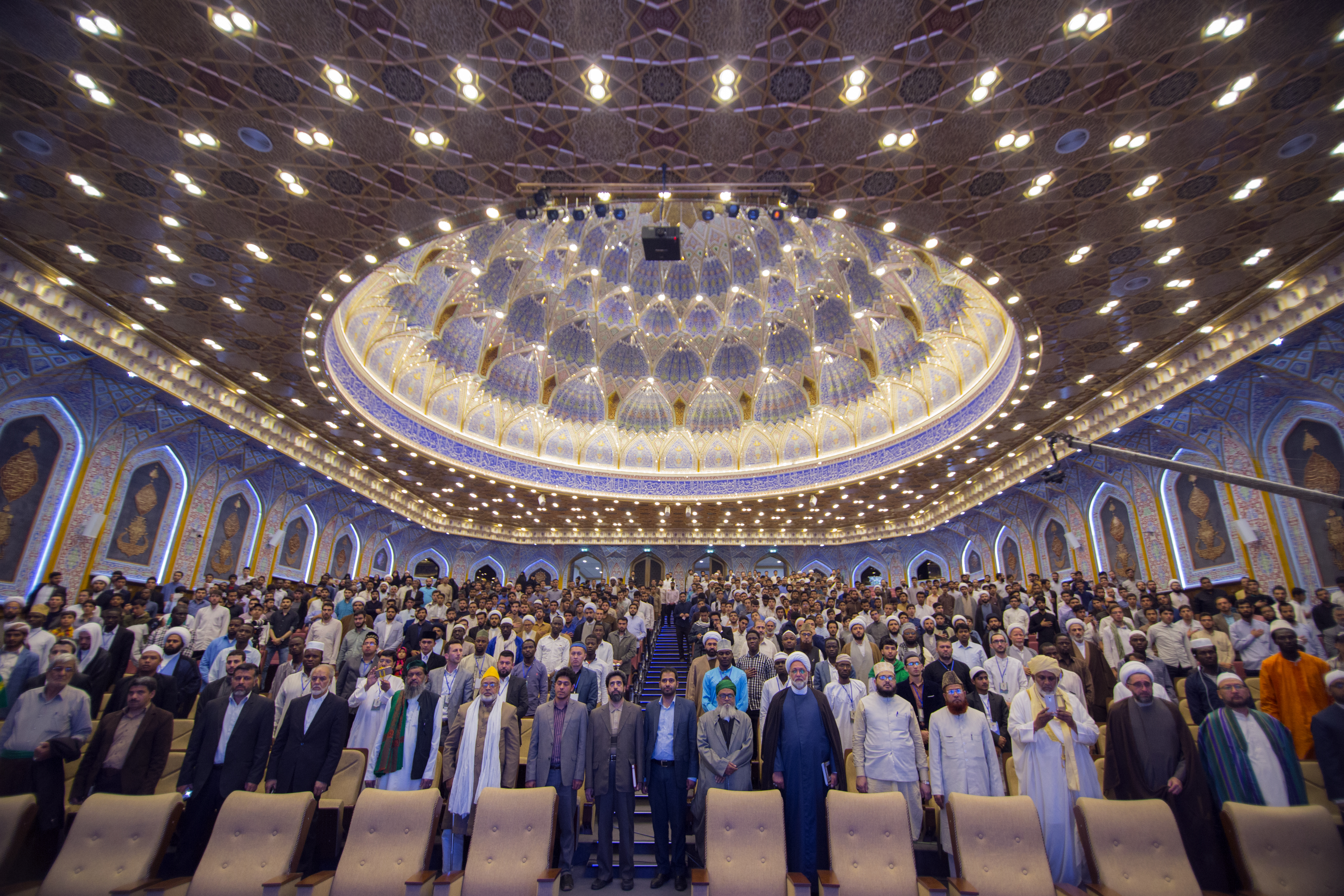
International Quran Competition for Students of Islamic Seminary Schools in the university

A brainchild of Ali Khamenei, the university has provided Islamic education exclusively to international students (including female scholars) mostly at a graduate level, in a combined seminary and academic format focused on the study of the Comparative Religion, Quran, Hadith, Islamic Jurisprudence, Islamic Philosophy and Discourse, Islamic Mysticism, Economics, Political Science, Psychology, Sociology, Education, Management, Persian Language and Literature, and Arabic. It also provides associate degree for French, Korean, Chinese, English, Japanese, Spanish and Russian.

It also provides Sunni Islam and Shia Islam seminary courses in English, Arabic and Persian.

As of 2020, some 80,000 students had graduated from Al-Mustafa International University over the years.

== Membership in international organizations ==
Besides participation in international scientific-cultural forum, Al-Mustafa University is a member of the following international scientific forums and organizations:

- Federation of the Universities of the Islamic World (FUIW)
- International Association of Universities (IAU)
- International Association of University Presidents (IAUP)
- Association of Universities of Asia and the Pacific (AUAP)
- Union of Islamic World Students (Rohama)

== History ==
The university was founded in 1979. The university is headquartered in Tehran but has branches in several other Iranian cities. According to the Washington Institute for Near East Policy, Al-Mustafa has operated an Iraqi branch in the Kadhimiya district of Baghdad since 2017, offering courses in Islamic knowledge, Quranic guidance, jurisprudence, and political Islam. The profile also states that the Iraq branch has held ideological workshops for members of the Popular Mobilization Forces.

On December 8, 2020, the United States Department of the Treasury (under Steven Mnuchin) sanctioned the university for recruiting students to fight in Syria. The university published a response.

== Controversy and Sanctions ==
In December 2020, the United States Department of the Treasury imposed sanctions on Al-Mustafa International University, alleging that it served as a recruitment platform for the Islamic Revolutionary Guard Corps (IRGC) Quds Force. The U.S. government claimed that the university was involved in recruiting foreign fighters, particularly from Afghanistan and Pakistan, for Iran's proxy wars in the region.

== Criticism and Defense ==
Critics argue that Al-Mustafa International University plays a role in spreading Iran's revolutionary ideology globally and serves as a tool for expanding Iranian influence. However, university officials and Iranian clerics have defended the institution, stating that it promotes peace, friendship, and understanding among nations through its educational programs.

== Presidents ==
- Ali Abbasi (through 2020-2021)
- Alireza Arafi, former president of Al-Mustafa International University (MIU)

== See also ==
- Ali Reza Tavassoli
- Pattern-making policy of the Islamic Republic

== International Journals ==
1. Contemporary Quranic Studies: https://dqm.journals.miu.ac.ir/?lang=en
2. Discourse of History: https://skh.journals.miu.ac.ir/?lang=en
3. Historical Studies of the Islamic World: https://mte.journals.miu.ac.ir/?lang=en
4. International Multidisciplinary Journal of Pure Life: https://p-l.journals.miu.ac.ir/
5. Journal of Persian language teaching Studies: https://maz.journals.miu.ac.ir/
6. Jurisprudence of Educational Studies: https://mft.journals.miu.ac.ir/?lang=en
7. Quran and Orientalists: https://qkh.journals.miu.ac.ir/?lang=en
8. Studies of Islamic Jurisprudence and Basis of Law: https://fvh.journals.miu.ac.ir/?lang=en
9. Studies of Quran Reading: https://qer.journals.miu.ac.ir/?lang=en
10. The Islamic Journal of Women and the Family: https://pzk.journals.miu.ac.ir/?lang=en
11. The Quran: Contemporary Studies: https://qns.journals.miu.ac.ir/
12. The Quran and Science: https://qve.journals.miu.ac.ir/?lang=en
13. Theology Journal: https://pke.journals.miu.ac.ir/?lang=en
