= Anti-American sentiment in Iran =

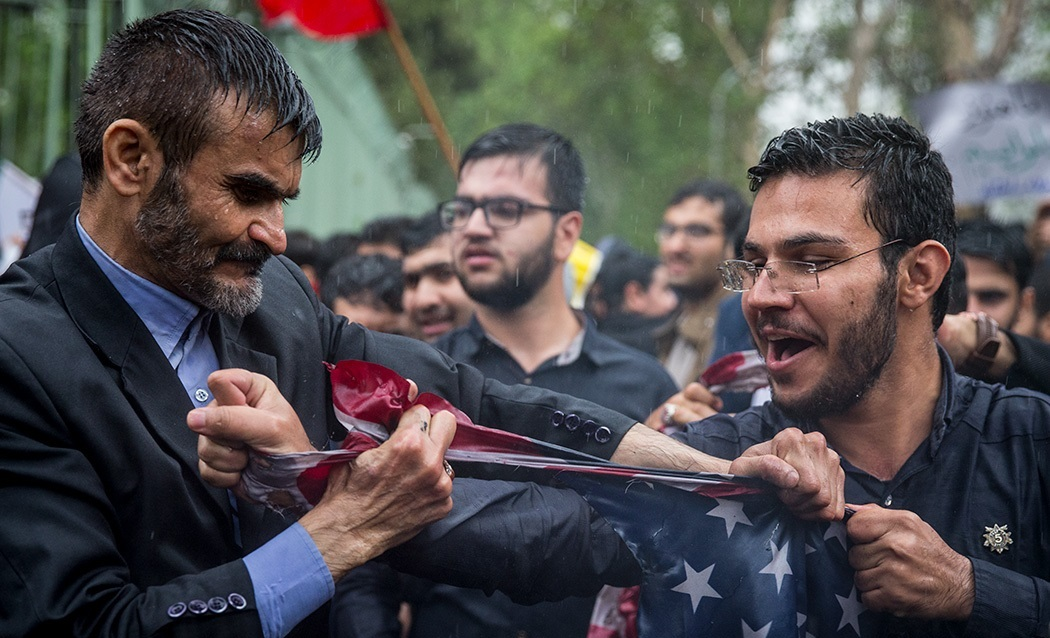
Two protesters in Iran tearing a U.S. flag at an anti-American rally after the United States withdrawal from the Joint Comprehensive Plan of Action

Anti-American sentiment in Iran has been prominent for decades. The chant "Death to America" has been in use in Iran since at least the Islamic revolution in 1979, along with other phrases often represented as anti-American. A 1953 coup which involved the CIA was cited as a grievance. State-sponsored murals characterised as anti-American dot the streets of Tehran. It has been suggested that under Ayatollah Khomeini anti-Americanism was little more than a way to distinguish between domestic supporters and detractors, and even the phrase "Great Satan" which has previously been associated with anti-Americanism, appears to now signify either the United States or the United Kingdom. The U.S. Embassy hostage crisis (1979–1981), where 52 Americans were held captive for 444 days, solidified this rhetoric as a pillar of the Islamic Republic’s identity. Notably, Khomeini’s anti-Americanism also served domestic political purposes, distinguishing loyalists from critics and consolidating power.

While "Death to America" remains a staple of official rhetoric, its interpretation has fluctuated. During the September 11 attacks, Iranian leaders temporarily softened the chant, translating it as "Down with America" to avoid appearing supportive of terrorism. Behind the scenes, historical records reveal pragmatic engagements, such as Khomeini’s secret 1979 overtures to the Carter administration to secure his return to Iran.

Some studies show that anti-Americanism in Iran is related to support for political Islam. US attempts to cripple Iran's economy have also significantly made Anti-American sentiment more common. Students from Tehran have been documented saying about US sanctions: “The more they push, the more it will lead to a rise in anti-Americanism.” and "It’s just a vicious circle." This alignment is evident in the rhetoric of groups like Hezbollah and Iraqi militias, which adopted "Death to America" under Iranian influence.

On 11 February 2026, the 47th anniversary of the 1979 revolution was marked by pro-government rallies and strong anti-American rhetoric.

== See also ==
- Anti-American sentiment
  - "Great Satan"
- Anti-Israeli sentiment
  - "Little Satan"
- Death to America
