= Death to America =

Anti-American political slogan

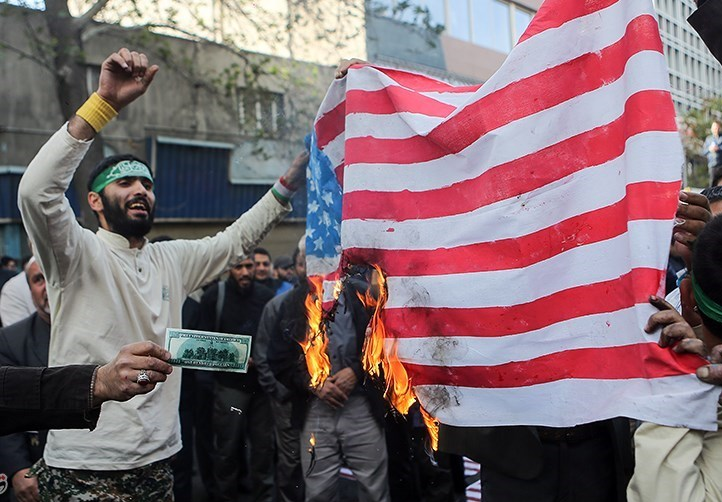
Iranian protesters burning the flag of the United States along with a fake U.S. dollar in Tehran, November 2018

"Death to America" (Note: Persian: مرگ بر آمریکا, romanized: Marg bar Âmrikâ; Arabic: الموت لأمريكا, romanized: al-mawt li-‘Amrīkā; Urdu: امریکا مردہ باد, romanized: Amrika murda bad; Pashto: مرګ په امریکا, romanized: Marg paa Amrika) is a political slogan expressing anti-Americanism or antipathy toward the United States. It has been widely used in Iran, Afghanistan, Lebanon, Yemen, Iraq, and Pakistan. Ruhollah Khomeini, the first supreme leader of Iran, popularized the term. The literal meaning of the Persian phrase Marg bar Âmrikâ (مرگ بر آمریکا) is "Death to America", though the phrase is translated into English as the less crude "Down with America" in most official Iranian translations. The chant "Death to America" has come to be employed by various anti-American groups and protesters worldwide.

The slogan has historically been contextualized as a reaction to the U.S. government's policies towards Islamic countries and merely an expression of outrage at those policies, not a wish for literal death for American people themselves. Iran's supreme leader Ali Khamenei interpreted the slogan as "death to the U.S.'s policies, death to arrogance" and death to specific American politicians, including Donald Trump, John Bolton, and Mike Pompeo, clarifying that Iranian people do not oppose the American people.

== History ==
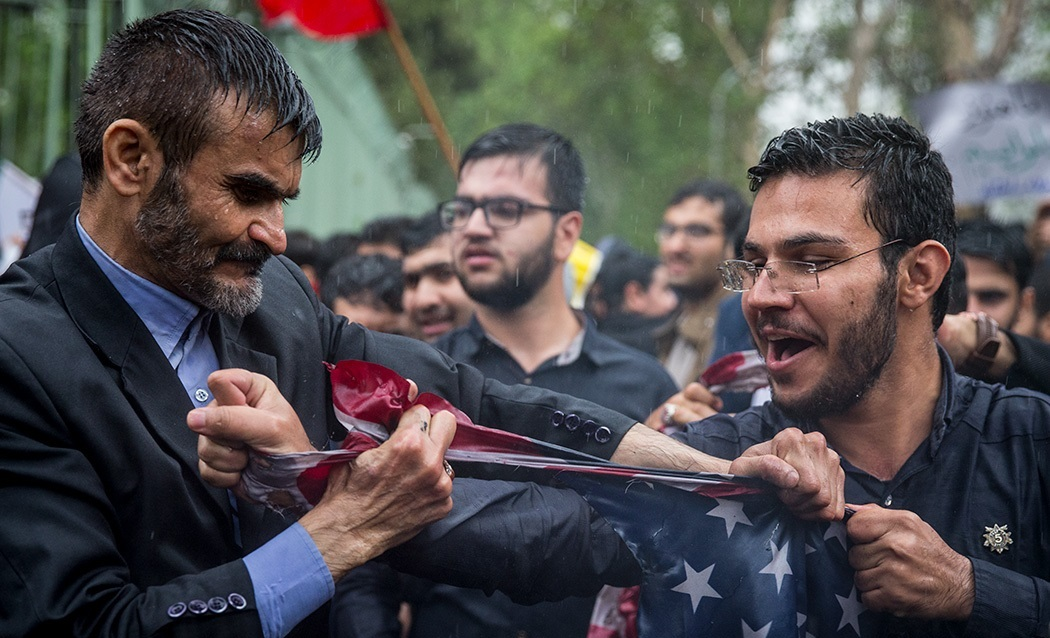
Two protesters in Iran tearing an American flag at an anti-American rally

Following the fall of the pro-American Pahlavi dynasty in early 1979, Iranian protesters regularly shouted "Death to America" and "Death to the Shah" outside the U.S. embassy in Tehran, including the day the embassy was seized on 4 November 1979, which commenced the Iran hostage crisis. Throughout the crisis, Iranians surrounding the embassy chanted "Death to America" and "Death to Carter". When Iran released the remaining 52 American hostages on 20 January 1981, they were led through a gauntlet of students forming parallel lines that shouted "Death to America" as they boarded the airplane that would fly them out of Tehran. A similar slogan "Death to Israel" (Persian: مرگ بر اسرائیل, romanized: Marg bar Esrâ'il) is also used, and regularly chanted in Iranian and Pakistani political rallies. It is the best-known variation.

Throughout the existence of the Islamic Republic of Iran, the slogan has formed a pillar of its revolutionary values. It has been chanted at Friday prayers (jumu'ah) and other public events, and been accompanied by burning of the flag of the United States. These events include the 4 November anniversary of the U.S. embassy seizure, which Iranian leaders declared in 1987 as a national holiday, called "Death to America Day". State-sponsored murals that feature the slogan "Death to America" are common in Iranian cities, particularly Tehran. According to Hashemi Rafsanjani, Khomeini agreed in principle to drop the usage of the slogan in 1984. Rafsanjani's statement was rejected by his hard line opponents who said that: "The Imam throughout his life called America 'the Great Satan'. He believed that all the Muslims' problems were caused by America". According to Politico magazine, following the September 11 attacks, the Supreme Leader of Iran Ali Khamenei "suspended the usual 'Death to America' chants at Friday prayers" temporarily.

On 29 March 2013, during a public gathering in Kim Il Sung Square, Pyongyang, North Korea to support Kim Jong Un's call to arms, attendees had chanted "Death to the U.S. imperialists".

On 21 March 2015, Khamenei backed and shouted the phrase 'Death to America' while addressing a public gathering in Iran, during the holiday of Nowruz, the Persian New Year. In a statement published on his website on November 3, 2015, Khamenei said: "It goes without saying that the slogan does not mean death to the American nation; this slogan means death to the U.S.'s policies, death to arrogance".

On 23 June 2017, during Quds Day, protesters chanted "Death to America" and "Death to Israel". On 25 April 2018, Iran announced that a "Death to America" emoji would be included in a domestically produced messaging app. On 9 May 2018, an American flag was burned in the Iranian Parliament amidst chants of "Death to America" after the United States withdrawal from the Joint Comprehensive Plan of Action (JCPOA; a nuclear deal with Iran) under President Donald Trump. On 4 November 2018, Louis Farrakhan, the leader of the religious group Nation of Islam (NOI), led a "Death to America" chant during a solidarity trip to Iran, ahead of sanctions expected to be imposed by the Trump administration.

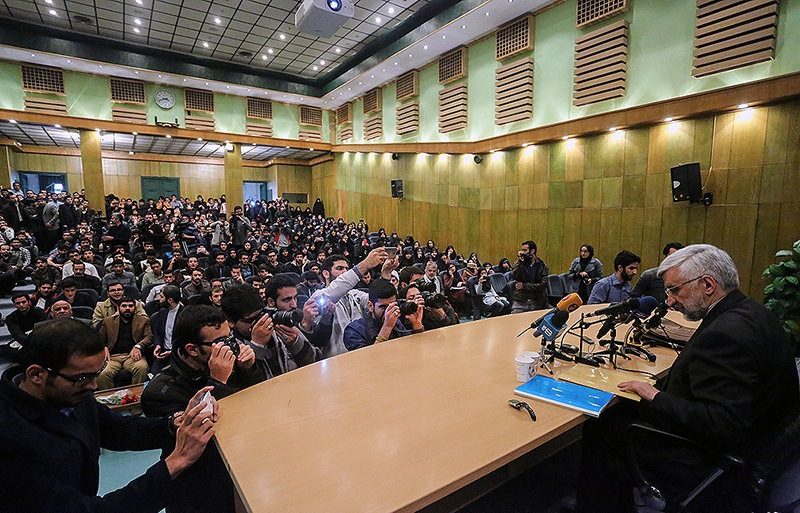
A conference named "Long Live Death to America" held on 3 November 2015, at the University of Tehran (UT), explores historical reasons for chanting the slogan

Many anti-Iranian government protesters, both within Iran and abroad, used similar phrases to demonstrate against the theocratic government. Slogans such as "Death to Khamenei", "Death to the Dictator" and "Death to the Islamic Republic" have been chanted in those occasions, the latest being the Mahsa Amini protests, which began in September 2022. Protesters also refused to trample over giant U.S. and Israeli flags that had been painted on the ground of the universities, which was praised by then-President Trump in 2020. At the funeral of Qasem Soleimani, the chant "Death to America" could be heard from many mourners across Baghdad, Islamabad, Karachi, and many other cities.

At the 2024 Quds Day rally in Dearborn, Michigan, some members of the crowd chanted "Death to America" in response to anti-America rhetoric by one of the speakers. The rally organizers later said the chants were "wrongful" and "a mistake", and Dearborn mayor Abdullah Hammoud said the chants were "unacceptable and contrary to the heart of this city".

== Use in the Middle East ==
The Sarkha of the Houthis in Yemen reads, "Allah is the greatest. Death to America. Death to Israel. A curse upon the Jews. Victory to Islam".

Supporters of Hezbollah, the Shia Islamist militant group based in Lebanon that is closely aligned to Iran, regularly chant "Death to America" in street demonstrations. A week before the U.S. invasion of Iraq on 20 March 2003, Hezbollah's Secretary-General Hassan Nasrallah declared:

In the past, when the Marines were in Beirut, we screamed, "Death to America!" Today, when the region is being filled with hundreds of thousands of American soldiers, "Death to America!" was, is and will stay our slogan.

The slogan of the Houthis, a Shia Islamist rebel group in Yemen also supported by Iran, is: "God is Great, Death to America, Death to Israel, A curse upon the Jews, Victory to Islam".

== Interpretation and meaning ==
Mohammad Nahavandian, chief of staff for Iranian former president Hassan Rouhani, said:

If you go and ask anyone who uses that slogan [...] what he is against, it is interference in Iran's policies by overthrowing a nationally elected prime minister at the time of [Mohammad] Mossadegh. For them, what they are against is the kind of government who shoots an airplane full of innocent passengers. For them, it's not the people of America, per se. For them, they are opposed to that sort of policy, that sort of attitude, that sort of arrogance. It's not a nation. It's a system of behavior."

Hussein al-Hamran, head of Foreign Relations for Ansar Allah (Houthis), said: "Regarding the words 'Death to America', we mean American politics, not the American people". Ali al-Bukhayti, a former spokesperson and official media face of the Houthis, said: "We do not really want death to anyone. The slogan is simply against the interference of those governments [i.e. the U.S., and Israel]". Rouhani also dismissed the literal interpretation of the slogan, stating that the slogan is to express opposition to U.S. intrusive policies rather than hatred against American people.

On 8 February 2019, Ali Khamenei stated "Death to America means death to [Donald] Trump, [John] Bolton and [Mike] Pompeo. We criticize American politicians who are managing that country. Iranian nation are not against American people". Travel writer Rick Steves recorded a taxi driver in Tehran exclaiming "Death to traffic!" in English, explaining that "when something frustrates us and we have no control over it, this is what we say". Steves compares the phrase to non-literal use of the word damn in American English.

== See also ==
- "Death to Arabs"
- "Death to Israel"
- "Great Satan"
- "Little Satan"
- Political slogans of the Islamic Republic of Iran
- Slogans of the 1979 Iranian Revolution
- Death to Khamenei
