= Great Satan =

Post-1979 Iranian epithet for the United States

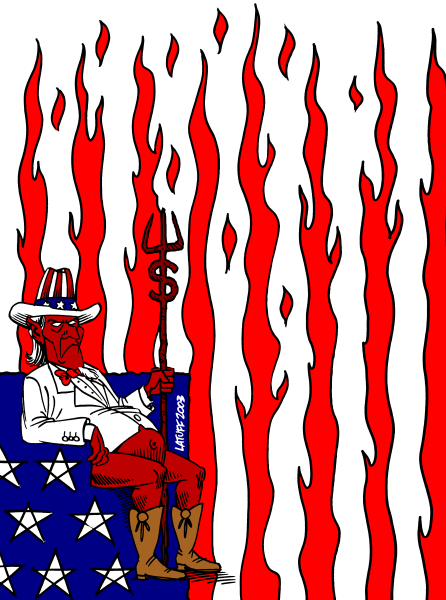
The Great Satan by Brazilian political cartoonist Carlos Latuff

"Great Satan" (Iranian Persian: شیطان بزرگ, romanized: šeytân-e bozorg) is a derogatory epithet used in Iran to refer to the United States. Alongside the slogan "Death to America", it originated in Iran during the Islamic Revolution. While it is primarily an expression of anti-American sentiment, it has occasionally been used to refer to the United Kingdom, although the term "old fox" is more popular as a dedicated expression of anti-British sentiment.

The epithet was coined by Iranian supreme leader Ruhollah Khomeini, who used it in a speech on 5 November 1979, one day after the onset of the Iran hostage crisis. In the speech, he condemned the United States as an imperialist power that sponsored corruption throughout the world. Khomeini introduced the epithet as the larger of a pair, using the term "Little Satan" to refer to Israel, particularly in the context of Israel–United States relations. In the context of the Cold War, Khomeini used the related term "Lesser Satan" to refer to the Soviet Union, and asserted that revolutionary Iran should oppose the Americans and the Soviets alike.

== Background ==
The government of the Islamic Republic of Iran has a long history of espousing anti-Western sentiment as a result of interference in Iranian affairs by the British and U.S. governments. In 1907, an agreement signed between the British and Russian Empires divided Iran into spheres of influence, infuriating Iranian public opinion.

46 years later in 1953, in response to the decision by Iranian prime minister Mohammad Mosaddegh to nationalize the petroleum industry in Iran, the Central Intelligence Agency (CIA) and the Secret Intelligence Service (SIS/MI6) organized a coup d'état to overthrow his administration in favor of a pro-Western leader, Shah Mohammad Reza Pahlavi. The Eisenhower administration was concerned that Mossaddegh's nationalist aspirations could lead to an eventual communist takeover of Iran. After widespread rioting and with aid from the CIA and MI6, Mossaddegh was defeated and the Shah returned to power, ensuring support for Western oil interests in Iran and ending the perceived threat of communist expansion. General Fazlollah Zahedi, who led the military coup, became prime minister. The operation was code-named Operation Ajax. At first, the military coup seemed to fail, and Shah Mohammed Reza Pahlavi fled the country.

In 1965, Ayatollah Khomeini was exiled for criticizing the White Revolution's decision to extend the franchise to women, initiate land reforms and the Shah's unpopular Status of Forces Bill, which gave U.S. military personnel diplomatic immunity for crimes committed in Iran. By the early 1970s, many Iranians opposed the Shah's government.

Khomeini eventually returned to Iran and led the 1979 Iranian revolution. During the Iranian Revolution, demonstrators commonly chanted slogans such as "Death to Shah", "Independence-Freedom-Islamic Republic", and "Death to America".

== Definition ==
=== Great Satan (United States) ===
Khomeini is quoted as saying on 5 November 1979: "[America is] the great Satan, the wounded snake". The term was used extensively during and after the 1979 Iranian Revolution, and it continues to be used in some Iranian political circles. Use of the term at rallies is often accompanied with Marg bar Âmrikâ (مرگ بر آمریکا). It is used in academic journals.

=== Lesser Satan (Soviet Union) ===
Khomeini called the Soviet Union, the principal antagonist of the US during the Cold War, the "Lesser Satan" because of its atheistic communist ideology, and he said that Iran should support neither side of the Cold War.

=== Little Satan (Israel) ===
The State of Israel was condemned as the "Little Satan" in 1979 by Khomeini when he was addressing Israel's backing of the Shah, its close ties to the U.S., and the ongoing Israeli–Palestinian conflict. Former Libyan leader Muammar Gaddafi also stated that "Israel is the little Satan" in a July 1980 interview.

== See also ==
- Devil (Islam)
- Criticism of Israel
- American Islam
- America can't do a damn thing against us
- Evil Empire speech
- Hermit kingdom
- Graveyard of empires
