= Little Satan =

Anti-Zionist epithet for Israel, used especially by Iran

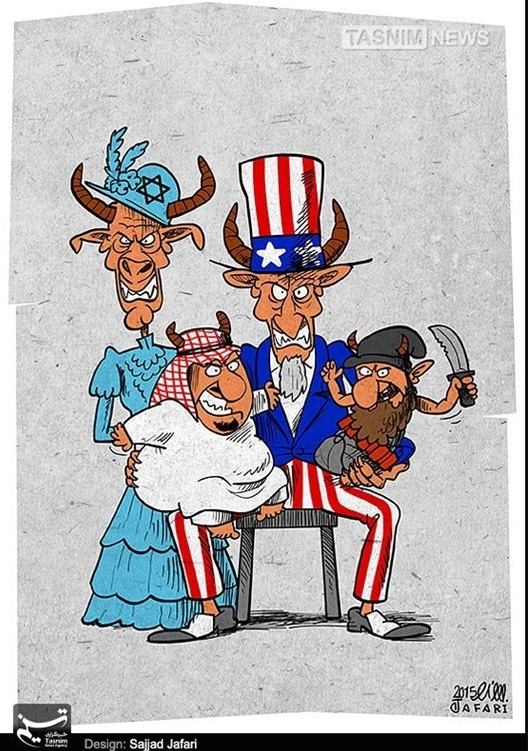
Caricature of Little Satan

"Little Satan" (Iranian Persian: شیطان کوچک, romanized: šaytân-e kučak; Arabic: الشيطان الأصغر, romanized: aš-šayṭān al-aṣḡar; Hebrew: השטן הקטן, romanized: ha-śāṭān ha-qaṭan) is an anti-Zionist derogatory epithet used especially by Iranian leaders for Israel.

The mirror term for the United States is "Great Satan".

== Etymology and history ==
When the Persian Empire adopted Islam as its state religion, the Persian language adopted numerous words from the Arabic language. One such word was شياطين shayāṭīn, which in turn had been adopted into Arabic from Hebrew: שטן, romanized: śāṭān, lit. 'adversary'.

According to some sources Ruhollah Khomeini, leader of Iranian Revolution, first used the term in its contemporary meaning. Israel was condemned as the "Little Satan" in 1979 by Khomeini when he was addressing Israel's backing of the Shah, its close ties to the US, and the ongoing Israeli–Palestinian conflict.

According to other sources, such as the Glasgow Herald, Colonel Gaddafi of Libya stated that "Israel is the little Satan" in July 1980.

Prime Minister of Israel, Benjamin Netanyahu, used this phrase when referring to Iranian rhetoric during a visit to the United States stating that: "For the Mullahs that rule Tehran, Israel is the small Satan and America is the great Satan."

== Contemporary use ==
The term is often used by Islamist militants to recruit fighters and by Shia Muslims to propagate hatred towards Israel. The term also features heavily in contemporary Iranian propaganda.

At the Fatima border gate near the Israel-Lebanon border, two pillars have been erected for people to perform a symbolic stoning of little Satan (Israel) and great Satan (the United States). It is hoped that Lebanese people will perform this act instead of throwing stones at Israeli soldiers. Hezbollah, which has the same political ideology as Iran, also refers to Israel as the Zionist entity and as little Satan.

== Analysis ==
According to Ze'ev Maghen writing in The Wall Street Journal:

"there's a critical distinction in Iran attitudes toward the 'Great Satan' and the 'little Satan', which should not be ignored; Although they chant 'Death to America' and 'Death to Israel' with equal fervor,' they tactically know 'that the Great Satan is [...] great.'"

In an address to the United States House of Representatives Government Reform Committee, Benjamin Netanyahu said that "the soldiers of militant Islam" call Israel 'Little Satan' "to distinguish it clearly from the country that has always been and will always be the Great Satan."

== See also ==
- Calls for the destruction of Israel
- Iran–Israel relations
- "Old fox"
- Operation Tyre
- "Israel won't exist in 25 years"
