= Ruhollah Khomeini =

Supreme Leader of Iran from 1979 to 1989

Grand Ayatollah; Sayyid; Ruhollah Khomeini
- روح‌الله خمینی
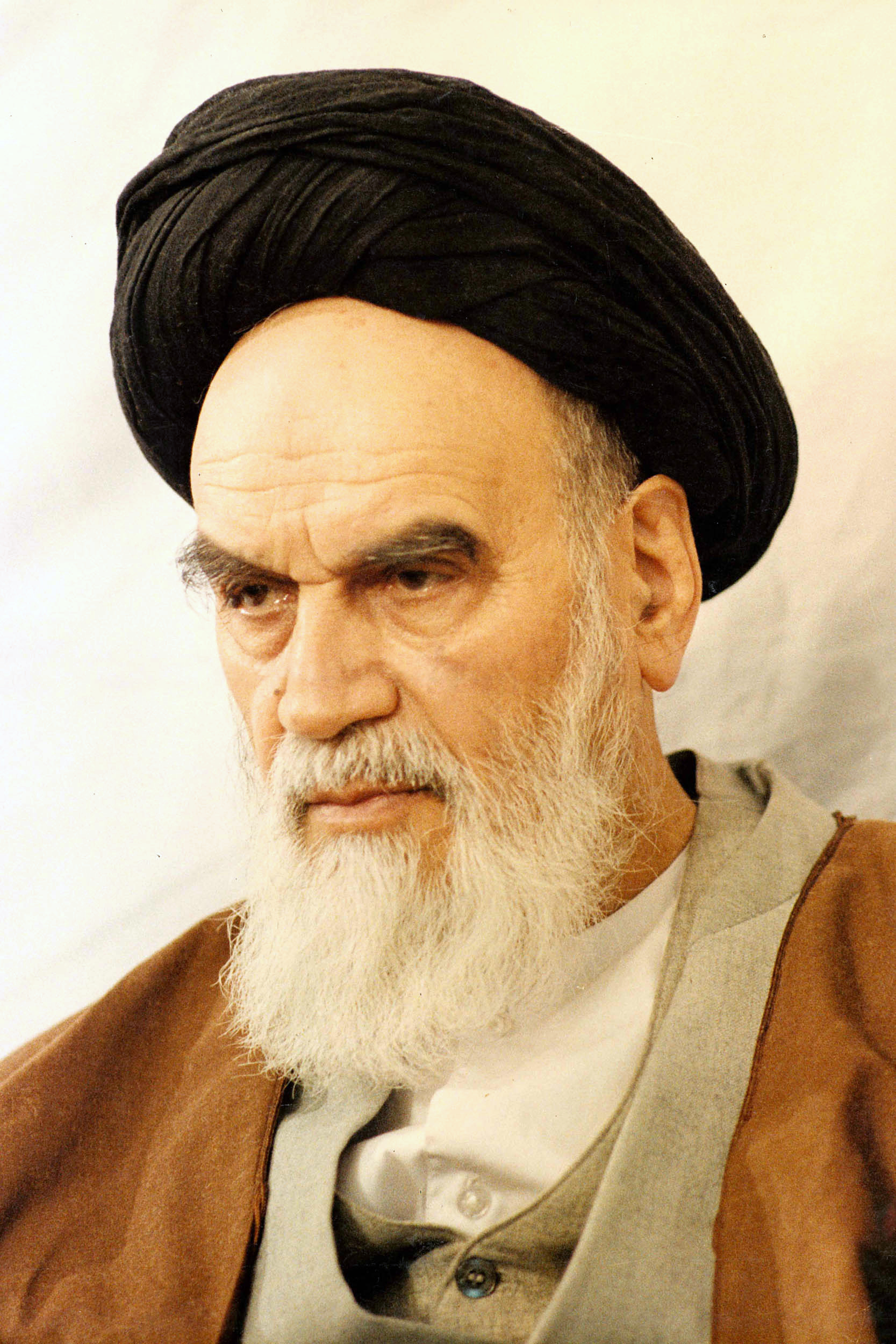
- Portrait of Ruhollah Khomeini c. 1980s

Supreme Leader of Iran
- In office 3 December 1979 – 3 June 1989
- President: See list: Abolhassan Banisadr; Mohammad-Ali Rajai; Ali Khamenei
- Prime Minister: See list: Mohammad-Ali Rajai; Mohammad-Javad Bahonar; Mohammad-Reza Mahdavi Kani; Mir-Hossein Mousavi
- Deputy: Hussein-Ali Montazeri (1985‍–‍1989)
- Preceded by: Himself (as Leader of the Revolution)
- Succeeded by: Ali Khamenei

Leader of the Revolution (Note: This was Khomeini's title as de facto head of state until 3 December 1979, when he was appointed Supreme Leader.)
- In office 4 February 1979 (Note: The head of state was disputed between Khomeini and Mohammad Reza Pahlavi from 4 to 11 February 1979.) – 3 December 1979
- Prime Minister: Mehdi Bazargan; Mohammad-Ali Rajai
- Preceded by: Mohammad Reza Pahlavi (as Shah)
- Succeeded by: Himself (as Supreme Leader)

Personal details
- Born: Ruhollah Mostafavi Musavi Khomeini; 17 May 1900 Khomeyn, Qajar Iran
- Died: 3 June 1989 (aged 89) Tehran, Iran
- Resting place: Mausoleum of Ruhollah Khomeini
- Spouse: Khadijeh Saqafi (m. 1929)
- Children: 7, including Mostafa, Zahra, Farideh, and Ahmad
- Relatives: Khomeini family
- Education: Qom Seminary
- Website: imam-khomeini.ir

Personal life
- Notable idea: New advance of guardianship
- Notable works: Forty Hadith of Ruhullah Khomeini; Kashf al-Asrar; Tahrir al-Wasilah; Islamic Government

Religious life
- Religion: Islam
- Denomination: Shi'a
- Sect: Twelver
- Jurisprudence: Ja'fari Usuli

Muslim leader
- Teacher: Husayn Burujardi
- Ruhollah Khomeini's voice Khomeini speaking on the importance of spirituality Recorded 24 November 1981

Styles of Ruhollah Khomeini
- Reference style: Eminent marji' al-taqlid, Ayatullah al-Uzma Imam Khumayni
- Spoken style: Imam Khomeini
- Religious style: Ayatullah al-Uzma Ruhollah Khomeini

Ruhollah Mostafavi Khomeini (Note: UK: /xɒˈmeɪni/ khom-AY-nee, US: /xoʊ-/ khohm-; Iranian Persian: روح‌الله مصطفوی خمینی, romanized: Ruhollâh Mostafavi Xomeyni, Iranian Persian pronunciation: [ɾuːholˈlɒːhe xomejˈniː]) (17 May 1900 (Note: The date of birth recorded on his birth certificate was 17 May 1900, although his brother Ayatollah Mortaza Pasandideh gives his birth date as 24 September 1902, the birth anniversary of Muhammad's daughter, Fatima.) – 3 June 1989) was an Iranian politician and Shia cleric who served as the first supreme leader of Iran from 1979 until his death in 1989. He was the leader of the Iranian Revolution, which overthrew Mohammad Reza Pahlavi, ended the Pahlavi era, and transformed the country into an Islamic republic. As supreme leader, he implemented policies that came to be known as Khomeinism.

Born in the city of Khomeyn, in what is now Iran's Markazi province, Khomeini's father was murdered when he was two years old. He began studying the Quran and Arabic from a young age assisted by his relatives. Khomeini became a high-ranking cleric in Twelver Shi'ism, an ayatollah, a marja' ("source of emulation"), a mujtahid, a faqīha (expert in fiqh), a hafiz, and the author of more than 40 books. His opposition to the White Revolution resulted in his state-sponsored expulsion to Bursa in 1964. Nearly a year later, he moved to Najaf, where speeches he gave outlining his religiopolitical theory of Guardianship of the Jurist were compiled into the book Islamic Government.

After the success of the Iranian Revolution, Khomeini served as the country's de facto head of state from February 1979 until his appointment as supreme leader in December of that same year. Khomeini was Time magazine's Man of the Year in 1979 for his international influence and in the next decade was described as the "virtual face of Shia Islam in Western popular culture". He was known for his support of the hostage takers during the Iran hostage crisis; his fatwa calling for the murder of Indian-born British novelist Salman Rushdie for Rushdie's description of the Islamic prophet Muhammad in his novel The Satanic Verses, which Khomeini considered blasphemous; pursuing the overthrow of Saddam Hussein in the Iran–Iraq War; and for referring to the United States as the "Great Satan", the Soviet Union as the "Lesser Satan" and Israel as the "Little Satan".

The subject of a pervasive cult of personality, Khomeini held the title Ayatollah and is officially known as Imam Khomeini inside Iran and by his supporters internationally. His state funeral was attended by up to 10 million people, one fifth of Iran's population at the time, and is considered one of the largest funerals in history.

Khomeini's legacy is controversial. In Iran, he is legally considered "inviolable"—insulting him is punishable with imprisonment; his gold-domed tomb in Tehran's Behesht-e Zahra cemetery has become a shrine for his adherents. While some view him as a champion of Islamic revival, independence, anti-imperialism, and resistance to foreign influence in Iran, Khomeini has been criticized for anti-Western and antisemitic rhetoric, anti-democratic actions, numerous human rights violations including the Iranian Cultural Revolution purges, 1981–1982 Iran massacres, 1988 mass executions of Iranian political prisoners, and for using child soldiers extensively during the Iran–Iraq War for human wave attacks. There were many protests during his rule, including in 1979 and 1981.

== Early years ==
=== Background ===
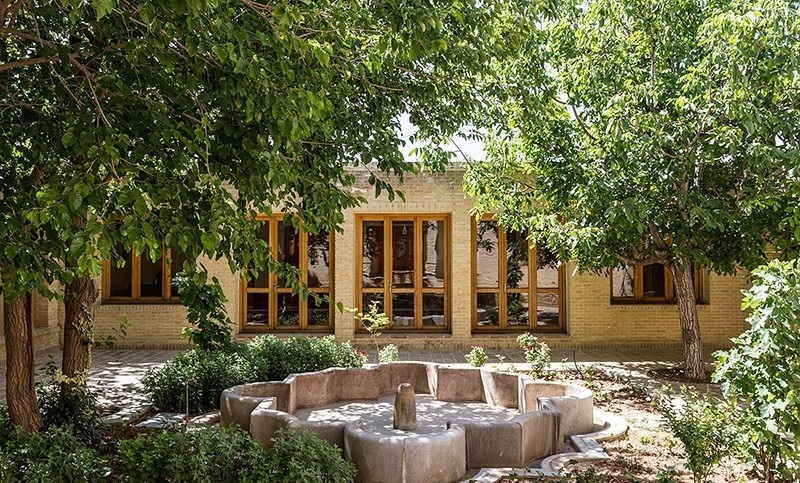
Khomeini's birthplace at Khomeyn

Ruhollah Mostafavi Musavi Khomeini came from a lineage of small landowners, clerics, and merchants. His ancestors migrated towards the end of the 18th century from their original home in Nishapur, then part of Khorasan province, in northeastern Iran for a short stay to the Kingdom of Awadh, a region in the present-day Indian state of Uttar Pradesh, whose rulers were Twelver Shi'a Muslims of Persian origin. During their rule, they extensively invited and received a steady stream of Persian scholars, poets, jurists, architects, and painters. The family eventually settled in the small town of Kintoor, near Lucknow, the capital of Awadh.

Khomeini's paternal grandfather, Ahmad Hindi, was born in Kintoor. He left Lucknow in 1830 on a pilgrimage to the tomb of Ali in Najaf, Ottoman Iraq (now Iraq), and never returned. According to biographer Baqer Moin, this migration was to escape from the spread of British power in India. In 1834, Seyyed Ahmad Musavi Hindi visited Iran, and in 1839, he settled in Khomein. Although he stayed and settled in Iran, he continued to be known as Hindi, indicating his stay in India, and Ruhollah Khomeini even used Hindi as a pen name in some of his ghazals. Khomeini's grandfather, Mirza Ahmad Mojtahed-e Khonsari was the cleric who issued a fatwa to forbid the usage of tobacco during the Tobacco Protest.

=== Childhood ===
According to his birth certificate, Ruhollah Mostafavi Musavi Khomeini, whose first name means "spirit of Allah", was born on 17 May 1900 in Khomeyn, Markazi province, although his brother Mortaza (later known as Ayatollah Pasandideh) gives his birth date of 24 September 1902, the birth anniversary of Muhammad's daughter, Fatima. He was raised by his mother, Agha Khanum, and his aunt, Sahebeth, following the murder of his father, Mustafa Musawi, over two years after his birth in 1903.

Ruhollah began to study the Quran and elementary Persian at the age of six. The following year, he began to attend a local school, where he learned religion, noheh khani (lamentation recital), and other traditional subjects. Throughout his childhood, he continued his religious education with the assistance of his relatives, including his mother's cousin, Ja'far, and his elder half-brother, Morteza Pasandideh, a cleric and poet.

=== Education and lecturing ===
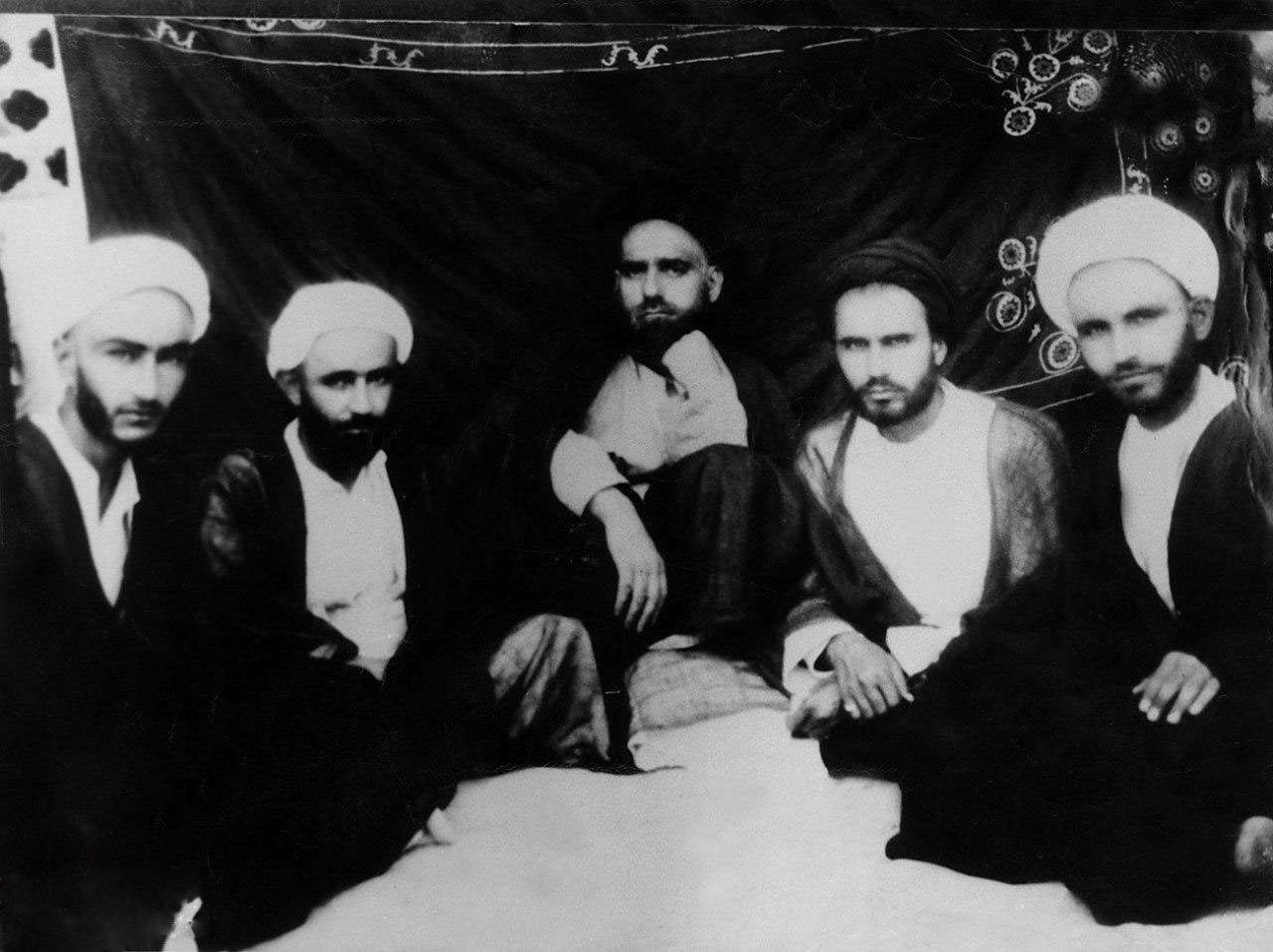
Khomeini as a student with his friends (second from right)

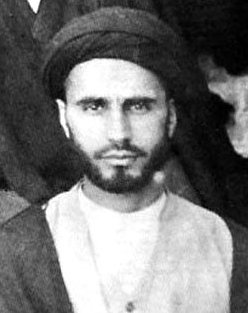
Khomeini in 1938

After World War I, arrangements were made for him to study at the Islamic seminary in Isfahan, but he preferred the seminary in Arak. He was placed under the leadership of Ayatollah Abdolkarim Haeri Yazdi. In 1920, Khomeini commenced his studies in Arak. The following year, Ayatollah Haeri Yazdi transferred to the Islamic seminary in the holy city of Qom, southwest of Tehran, and invited his students to follow. Khomeini accepted the invitation and took up residence at the Dar al-Shafa school in Qom. Khomeini's studies included Islamic law (sharia) and jurisprudence (fiqh), but by that time, Khomeini had also acquired an interest in poetry and philosophy (irfan). So, upon arriving in Qom, Khomeini sought the guidance of Mirza Ali Akbar Yazdi, a scholar of philosophy and mysticism. Yazdi died in 1924, but Khomeini continued to pursue his interest in philosophy with two other teachers, Javad Aqa Maleki Tabrizi and Rafi'i Qazvini. However, Khomeini's biggest influences were Mohammad Ali Shah Abadi, and historic Sufi mystics Mulla Sadra and Ibn Arabi.

Khomeini studied ancient Greek philosophy and was influenced by both the philosophy of Aristotle, whom he regarded as the founder of logic, and Plato, whose views "in the field of divinity" he regarded as "grave and solid". Among Islamic philosophers, Khomeini was mainly influenced by Avicenna and Mulla Sadra. Apart from philosophy, Khomeini was interested in literature and poetry. His poetry collection was released after his death. Beginning in his adolescent years, Khomeini composed mystic, political and social poetry. His poetry works were published in three collections: The Confidant, The Decanter of Love and Turning Point, and Divan. His knowledge of poetry is further attested by the modern poet Nader Naderpour (1929–2000), who "had spent many hours exchanging poems with Khomeini in the early 1960s". Naderpour remembered: "For four hours we recited poetry. Every single line I recited from any poet, he recited the next."

Ruhollah Khomeini was a lecturer at Najaf and Qom seminaries for decades before he was known on the political scene. He soon became a leading scholar of Shia Islam. He taught political philosophy, Islamic history and ethics. Several of his students, for example Morteza Motahhari, later became leading Islamic philosophers and also marja'. As a scholar and teacher, Khomeini produced numerous writings on Islamic philosophy, law, and ethics. He showed an exceptional interest in subjects like philosophy and mysticism that not only were usually absent from the curriculum of seminaries but were often an object of hostility and suspicion.

Inaugurating his teaching career at the age of 27 by giving private lessons on irfan and Mulla Sadra to a private circle, around the same time, in 1928, he also released his first publication, Sharh Du'a al-Sahar (Commentary on the Du'a al-Baha), "a detailed commentary, in Arabic, on the prayer recited before dawn during Ramadan by Imam Ja'far al-Sadiq", followed, some years later, by Sirr al-Salat (Secret of the Prayer), where "the symbolic dimensions and inner meaning of every part of the prayer, from the ablution that precedes it to the salam that concludes it, are expounded in a rich, complex, and eloquent language that owes much to the concepts and terminology of Ibn 'Arabi. As Sayyid Fihri, the editor and translator of Sirr al-Salat, has remarked, the work is addressed only to the foremost among the spiritual elite (akhass-i khavass) and establishes its author as one of their number." The second book has been translated by Sayyid Amjad H. Shah Naqavi and released by Brill Publishers in 2015 under the title The Mystery of Prayer: The Ascension of the Wayfarers and the Prayer of the Gnostics.

=== Political aspects ===
His seminary teaching often focused on the importance of religion to practical social and political issues of the day, and he worked against secularism in the 1940s. His first political book Kashf al-Asrar (Uncovering of Secrets), published in 1942, was a point-by-point refutation of Asrar-e Hezar Sale (Secrets of a Thousand Years), a tract written by a disciple of Iran's leading anti-clerical historian Ahmad Kasravi, as well as a condemnation of innovations such as international time zones, (Note: In "A Warning to the Nation" published in 1941, Khomeini wrote, "We have nothing to say to those ... [who] have forfeited them faculties so completely to the foreigners that they even imitate them in matters of time; what is left for us to say to them? As you all know, noon is now officially reckoned in Tehran twenty minutes before the sun has reached the meridian, in imitation of Europe. So far no one has stood up to ask, "what nightmare is this into which we are being plunged?" Prior to the International Time Zone system, every locality had its own time with 12 noon set to match the moment in that city when the sun was at its highest point in the sky. This was natural for an era when travel was relatively slow and infrequent but would have played havoc with railway timetables and general modern long-distance communications. In the decades after 1880 governments around the world replaced local time with 24 international time zones, each covering 15 degrees of the earth's longitude (with some exceptions for political boundaries).Khomeini, Ruhollah (1981). Islam and Revolution: Writing and Declarations of Imam Khomeini. Translated and Annotated by Hamid Algar. Mizan Press. p. 172.) and the banning of hijab by Reza Shah, whom he always blamed for his father's murder. In addition, he went from Qom to Tehran to listen to Ayatullah Hasan Mudarris, the leader of the opposition majority in Iran's parliament during the 1920s. Khomeini became a marja' in 1963, following the death of Grand Ayatollah Seyyed Husayn Borujerdi. Khomeini also valued the ideals of Islamists such as Sheikh Fazlollah Noori and Abol-Ghasem Kashani. Khomeini saw Fazlollah Nuri as a "heroic figure", and his own objections to constitutionalism and a secular government derived from Nuri's objections to the 1907 constitution.

== Early political activity ==
=== Background ===
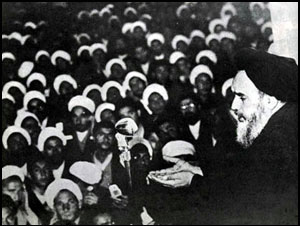
Khomeini's speech against the Shah in Qom, 1964

In the late 19th century, the clergy had shown themselves to be a powerful political force in Iran initiating the Tobacco Protest against a concession to a foreign (British) interest. At the age of 61, Khomeini found the arena of leadership open following the deaths of Ayatollah Sayyed Husayn Borujerdi (1961), the leading, although quiescent, Shia religious leader; and Ayatollah Abol-Ghasem Kashani (1962), an activist cleric. The clerical class had been on the defensive ever since the 1920s when the secular, anti-clerical modernizer Reza Shah Pahlavi rose to power. Reza Shah's son Mohammad Reza Shah instituted the White Revolution, which was a further challenge to the Ulama.

=== Opposition to the White Revolution ===
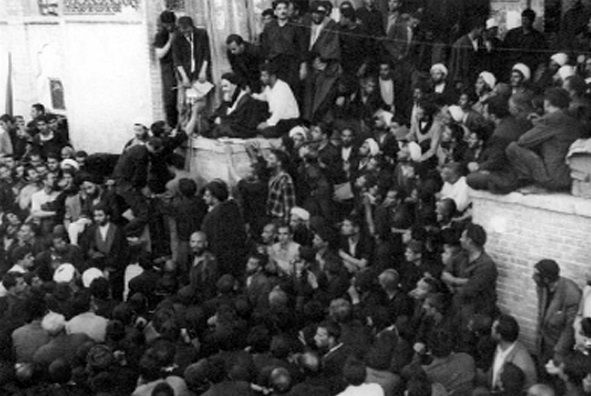
Khomeini denouncing the Shah on 'Ashura, 3 June 1963

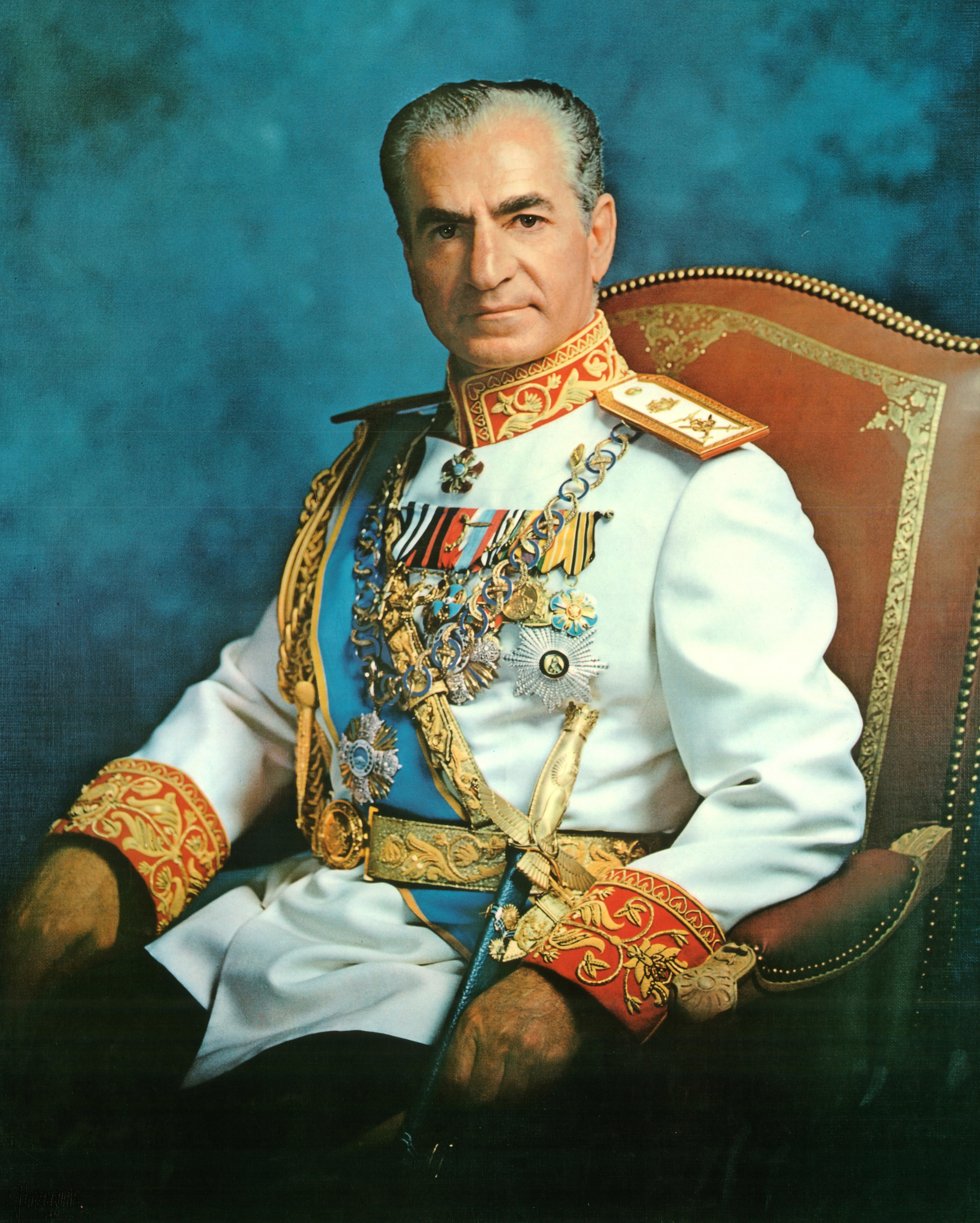
Shah Mohammad Reza Pahlavi

In January 1963, the Shah announced the White Revolution, a multi-point programme of reform calling for land reform, nationalization of the forests, the sale of state-owned enterprises to private interests, electoral changes to enfranchise women and allow non-Muslims to hold office, profit-sharing in industry, a literacy campaign in the nation's schools, etc. Some of these initiatives were regarded as Westernising trends and a threat by traditionalists. Khomeini viewed them as "an attack on Islam". The powerful Shia Ulama (religious scholars) had much to lose from land redistribution to peasants as they administered and earned much of their revenue from huge tracts of land as charitable trusts (vaqf). Khomeini also attacked reform measures such as the elimination of the restriction that only male Muslims could be judges, complaining that "henceforth, Jews, Christians, and the enemies of Islam and the Muslims are to decide on affairs concerning the honor and person of the Muslims". Khomeini summoned a meeting of the other senior Marja's of Qom and persuaded them to decree a boycott of the referendum on the White Revolution. On 22 January 1963, Khomeini issued a strongly worded declaration denouncing both the Shah and his reform plan. Two days later, the Shah took an armored column to Qom, and delivered a speech harshly attacking the Ulama as a class.

Khomeini continued his denunciation of the Shah's programmes, issuing a manifesto that bore the signatures of eight other senior Shia religious scholars. Khomeini's manifesto argued that the Shah had violated the constitution in various ways, condemned the spread of moral corruption in the country, and accused the Shah of submission to the United States and Israel. He also decreed that the Nowruz celebrations for the Iranian year 1342 (which fell on 21 March 1963) be canceled as a sign of protest against government policies.

On the afternoon of 'Ashura (3 June 1963), Khomeini delivered a speech at the Feyziyeh madrasa drawing parallels between the Caliph Yazid I, who is perceived as a "tyrant" by Shias, and the Shah, denouncing the Shah as a "wretched, miserable man", and warning him that if he did not change his ways the day would come when the people would offer up thanks for his departure from the country. On 5 June 1963 (15 of Khordad) at 3:00 am, two days after this public denunciation of the Shah, Khomeini was detained in Qom and transferred to Tehran. Following this action, there were three days of major riots throughout Iran and the deaths of some 400 people. That event is now referred to as the Movement of 15 Khordad. Khomeini remained under house arrest until August.

=== Opposition to capitulation ===
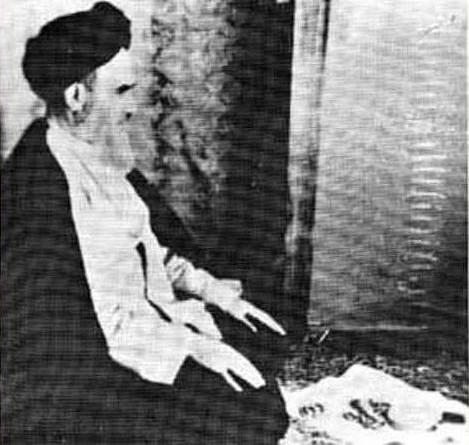
Khomeini in prayer

On 26 October 1964, Khomeini denounced both the Shah and the United States. This time it was in response to the "capitulations" or diplomatic immunity granted by the Shah to American military personnel in Iran. What Khomeini labeled a capitulation law was in fact a "Status of forces agreement", stipulating that U.S. servicemen facing criminal charges stemming from a deployment in Iran were to be tried before a U.S. court martial, not an Iranian court. Khomeini was arrested in November 1964 and held for half a year. Upon his release, Khomeini was brought before Prime Minister Hassan Ali Mansur, who tried to convince him to apologize for his harsh rhetoric and going forward, cease his opposition to the Shah and his government. When Khomeini refused, Mansur slapped him in the face in a fit of rage. Two months later, Mansur was assassinated on his way to parliament. Four members of the Fadayan-e Islam, a Shia militia sympathetic to Khomeini, were later executed for the murder.

== Life in exile ==
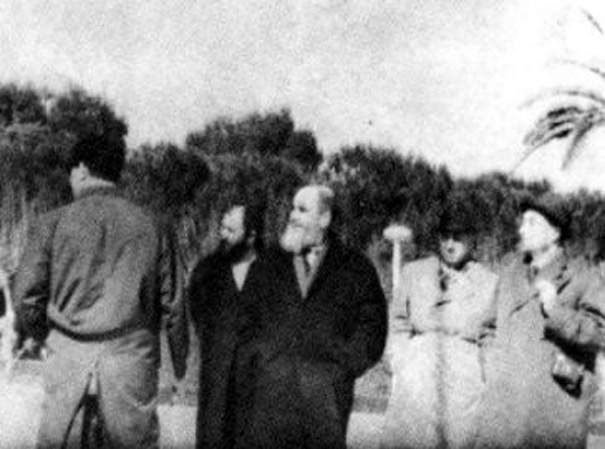
Khomeini in exile at Bursa, Turkey, without clerical dress

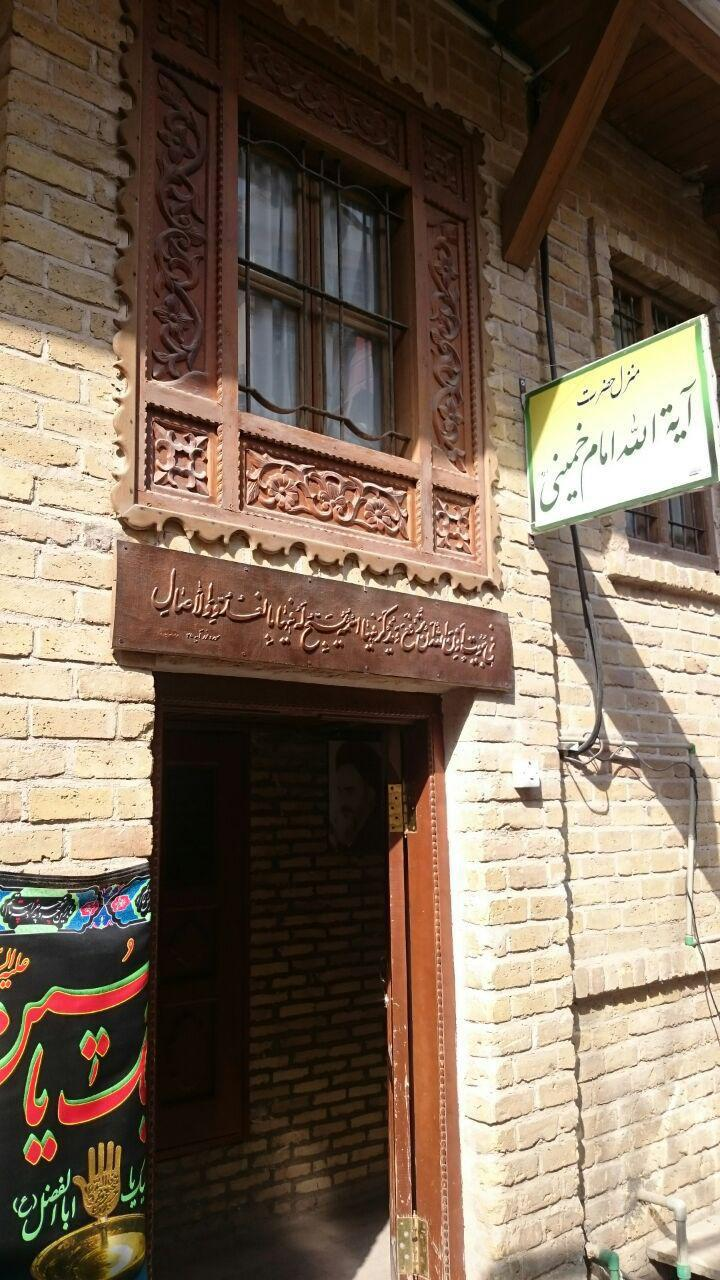
The entrance of Khomeini's house in Najaf, Iraq

Khomeini spent more than 14 years in exile, mostly in the holy Iraqi city of Najaf. Initially, he was sent to Turkey on 4 November 1964 where he stayed in Bursa in the home of Colonel Ali Cetiner of the Turkish Military Intelligence. In October 1965, after less than a year, he was allowed to move to Najaf, Iraq, where he stayed until 1978, when he was expelled by then-Vice President Saddam Hussein. By this time, discontent with the Shah was becoming intense and Khomeini visited Neauphle-le-Château, a suburb of Paris, France, on a tourist visa on 6 October 1978.

By the late 1960s, Khomeini was a marja-e taqlid (model for imitation) for "hundreds of thousands" of Shia, one of six or so models in the Shia world at the time. While in the 1940s Khomeini accepted the idea of a limited monarchy under the Persian Constitution of 1906 – as evidenced by his book Kashf al-Asrar – by the 1970s he had rejected the idea. In early 1970, Khomeini gave a series of lectures in Najaf on Islamic government, later published as a book titled variously Islamic Government or Islamic Government: Governance of the Jurist (Hokumat-e Islami: Velayat-e faqih). This principle, though not known to the wider public before the revolution, was integrated into the new Iranian constitution after the revolution.

=== Velâyat-e Faqih ===
Velâyat-e Faqih was his best known and most influential work, and laid out his ideas on governance (at that time):

- That the laws of society should be made up only of the laws of God (Sharia). Other laws are unnecessary because Sharia laws cover "all human affairs" and "provide instruction and establish norms" for every topic in human life.
- Since Sharia, or Islamic law, is the proper law, those holding government posts should have a deep knowledge of Sharia. Since Islamic jurists or faqih have studied and are the most knowledgeable in Sharia, the country's ruler should be a faqih who "surpasses all others in knowledge" of Islamic law and justice, (known as a marja'), as well as having intelligence and administrative ability. Rule by monarchs or assemblies of "those claiming to be representatives of the majority of the people" (i.e. elected parliaments and legislatures) has been proclaimed "wrong" by Islam.
- This system of clerical rule is necessary to prevent injustice, corruption, oppression by the powerful over the poor and weak, innovation and deviation of Islam and Sharia law, and also to destroy anti-Islamic influence and conspiracies by non-Muslim foreign powers.

=== Pre-revolutionary political activity ===
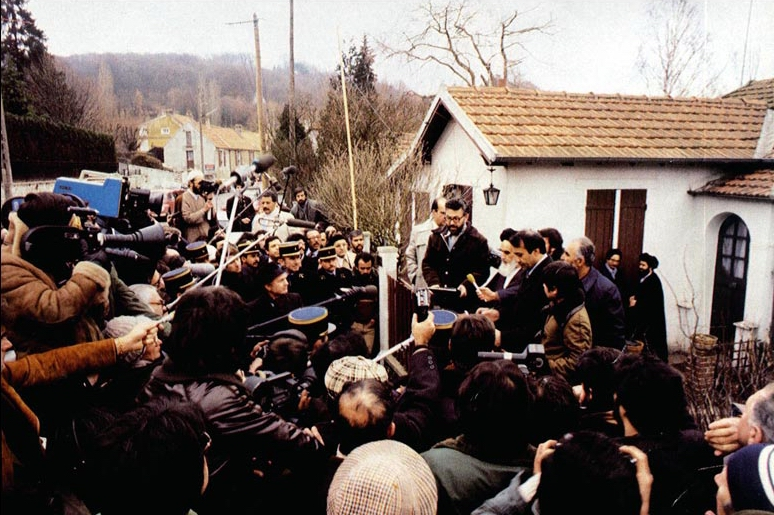
Khomeini in front of his house at Neauphle-le-Château in a media conference

A modified form of this wilayat al-faqih system was adopted after Khomeini and his followers took power, and Khomeini was the Islamic Republic's first "Guardian" Islamic scholar or "Supreme Leader". In the meantime, Khomeini talked only about "Islamic Government", never spelling out what exactly that meant. Khomeini was careful not to publicize his ideas for clerical rule outside of his Islamic network of opposition to the Shah and so not frighten away the secular middle class from his movement. His network may have been learning about the necessity of rule by Jurists, but "in his interviews, speeches, messages and fatvas during this period, there is not a single reference to velayat-e faqih." Publicly his movement emphasized populism, talking about fighting for the mustazafin, (a Quranic term for the oppressed or deprived), that in this context came to mean "just about everyone in Iran except the shah and the imperial court".

In Iran, a number of missteps by the Shah, including his repression of opponents, began to build opposition to his regime. Cassette copies of Khomeini's lectures fiercely denouncing the Shah, for example as "the Jewish agent, the American serpent whose head must be smashed with a stone", became common items in the markets of Iran, helping to demythologize the power and dignity of the Shah and his reign. As Iran became more polarized and opposition more radical, Khomeini "was able to mobilize the entire network of mosques in Iran", along with their pious faithful, regular gatherings, hitherto skeptical Mullah leaders, and the support of "over 20,000 properties and buildings throughout Iran"—a political resource the secular middle class and Shiite socialists could not hope to compete with.

Aware of the importance of broadening his base, Khomeini reached out to Islamic reformists and secular enemies of the Shah, groups that he and his supporters would suppress after taking and consolidating power. After the 1977 death of Ali Shariati, an Islamic reformist and political revolutionary author, academic, and philosopher who greatly accelerated the Islamic revival among young educated Iranians, Khomeini became the most influential leader of the opposition to the Shah. Adding to his mystique was the circulation among Iranians in the 1970s of an old Shia saying attributed to the seventh Imam, Musa al-Kazim. Prior to his death in 799, al-Kazim was said to have prophesied that "[a] man will come out from Qom and he will summon people to the right path". In late 1978, a rumour swept the country that Khomeini's face could be seen in the full moon. Millions of people were said to have seen it and the event was celebrated in thousands of mosques. The phenomenon was thought to demonstrate that by late 1978 he was increasingly regarded as a messianic figure in Iran and was perceived by many as the spiritual as well as political leader of the revolt.

As protests grew, so did his profile and importance. Although several thousand kilometers away from Iran in Paris, Khomeini set the course of the revolution, urging Iranians not to compromise and ordering work stoppages against the shah's regime. During the last few months of his exile, Khomeini received a constant stream of reporters, supporters, and notables, eager to hear the spiritual leader of the revolution. While in exile, Khomeini developed what historian Ervand Abrahamian described as a "populist clerical version of Shia Islam". Khomeini modified previous Shia interpretations of Islam in a number of ways that included aggressive approaches to espousing the general interests of the mostazafin, forcefully arguing that the clergy's sacred duty was to take over the state so that it could implement sharia, and exhorting followers to protest. Despite their ideological differences, Khomeini also allied with the People's Mujahedin of Iran during the early 1970s and started funding their armed operations against the Shah.

==== Khomeini's contact with the United States ====
In the official narrative of the Iranian revolution, Khomeini bravely defied the U.S. and defeated the Great Satan, "staunchly" resisting any direct contact with the US. However, U.S. government documents — "diplomatic cables, policy memos, meeting records" declassified in 2016 and published by the BBC — indicate Khomeini did send messages to the US two weeks prior to the revolution, and that these may have been successful in facilitating his return from exile to Iran. According to the documents, Khomeini told an American in France to convey a message to Washington that "You will see we are not in any particular animosity with the Americans," said that his Islamic Republic will be "a humanitarian one, which will benefit the cause of peace and tranquillity for all mankind". Khomeini also "pledged not to destroy the military". The Carter administration helped Khomeini return to Iran by preventing the Iranian army from launching a military coup.

A CIA analysis report titled "Islam in Iran", also indicates that years earlier, in November 1963, Khomeini (while under house arrest for rallying opposition to the shah's White Revolution reforms as a foreign inspired "attack on Islam"), contacted the administration of U.S. president John F. Kennedy, sending a message through cleric and Tehran University professor Haj Mirza Khalil Kamarah'i. In it, he stated that he "was not opposed to American interests in Iran", and that "on the contrary, he thought the American presence was necessary as a counterbalance to Soviet and possibly British influence".

According to Kambiz Fattahi of the BBC, the documents show that Carter's gullible attempts to understand Khomeini's plans were a "massive blunder" underestimating Khomeini's mendacious shrewdness, while Khomeini "played his hand masterfully". Within a year large numbers of high level Iranian military were executed, Khomeini was holding the US Chargé d'Affaires and dozens of other Americans hostage in Tehran under the slogan "America can't do a damn thing," and establishing an anti-American legacy that lasted for decades. Supreme leader Ayatollah Ali Khamenei denied the report, and described the documents as "fabricated". Other Iranian politicians, including Ebrahim Yazdi, who was Khomeini's spokesman and adviser at the time of the revolution, denounced the documents and the BBC's report.

== Supreme Leader of Iran (1979–1989) ==
=== Return to Iran ===
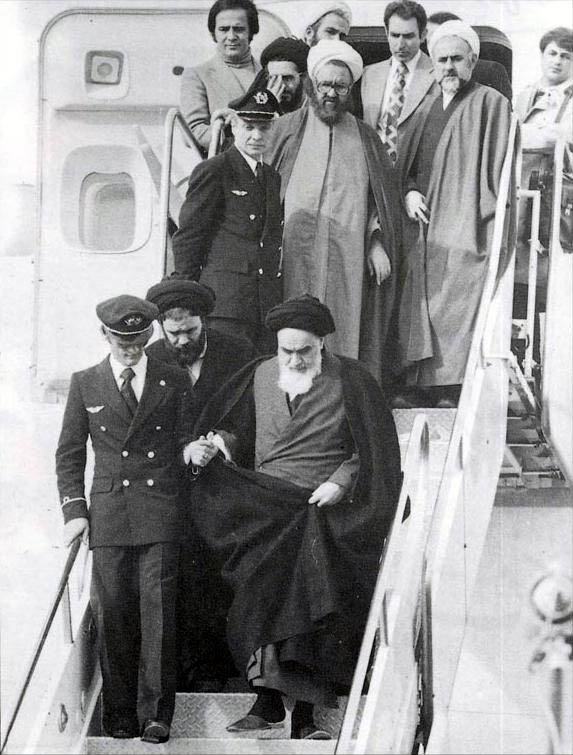
Arrival of Khomeini on 1 February 1979 escorted by an Air France pilot. Asked how he felt about his return from exile, he replied "Hichi" (Nothing).

On 16 January 1979, the Shah left the country for medical treatment (ostensibly "on vacation"), never to return. Two weeks later, on Thursday, 1 February 1979, Khomeini returned in triumph to Iran, welcomed by a joyous crowd reported to be of up to five million people. On his chartered Air France flight back to Tehran, he was accompanied by 120 journalists, including three women. One of the journalists, Peter Jennings, asked: "Ayatollah, would you be so kind as to tell us how you feel about being back in Iran?" Khomeini answered via his aide Sadegh Ghotbzadeh: "Hichi" (Nothing). This statement – much discussed at the time and since – was considered by some to be reflective of his mystical beliefs and non-attachment to ego, by others to be a warning to Iranians who hoped he would be a "mainstream nationalist leader" that they were in for disappointment, or of Khomeini's disinterest in the desires, beliefs, or the needs of the Iranian populace. He was Time magazine's Man of the Year in 1979 for his international influence.

=== Leader of the Revolution ===
Khomeini adamantly opposed the provisional government of Shapour Bakhtiar, promising "I shall kick their teeth in. I appoint the government." On 11 February (Bahman 22), Khomeini appointed his own competing interim prime minister, Mehdi Bazargan, demanding, "since I have appointed him, he must be obeyed". He warned it was "God's government", and disobedience against him or Bazargan was considered a "revolt against God", and "revolt against God is Blasphemy".

As Khomeini's movement gained momentum, soldiers began to defect to his side and Khomeini declared ill fortune on troops who did not surrender. On 11 February, as the revolt spread and armories were taken over, the military declared neutrality and the Bakhtiar regime collapsed. On 30 and 31 March 1979, a referendum to replace the monarchy with an Islamic Republic—with the question: "should the monarchy be abolished in favour of an Islamic Government?"—passed with 98% voting in favour of the replacement.

==== Beginning of the consolidation of power ====
While in Paris, Khomeini had "promised a democratic political system" for Iran but once in power advocated for the creation of theocracy, which was based on the Velayat-e faqih. This began the process of suppression of groups inside his broad coalition but outside his religious network—groups that had placed their hopes in Khomeini but whose support was no longer needed. This also led to the purge or replacement of many secular politicians in Iran, with Khomeini and his close associates taking the following steps: establishing Islamic Revolutionary courts; replacing the previous military and police force; placing Iran's top theologians and Islamic intellectuals in charge of writing a theocratic constitution, with a central role for Velayat-e faqih; creating the Islamic Republic Party (IRP) through Khomeini's Motjaheds with the aim of establishing a theocratic government and tearing down any secular opposition; replacing all secular laws with Islamic laws; and neutralising or punishing top theologians ("Khomeini's competitors in the religious hierarchy"), whose ideas conflicted with Khomeini's, including Mohammad Kazem Shariatmadari, Hassan Tabatabaei Qomi, and Hossein Ali Montazeri. Some newspapers were closed, and those protesting the closings were attacked. Opposition groups such as the National Democratic Front and Muslim People's Republican Party were attacked and finally banned.

==== Islamic constitution and becoming Supreme Leader ====
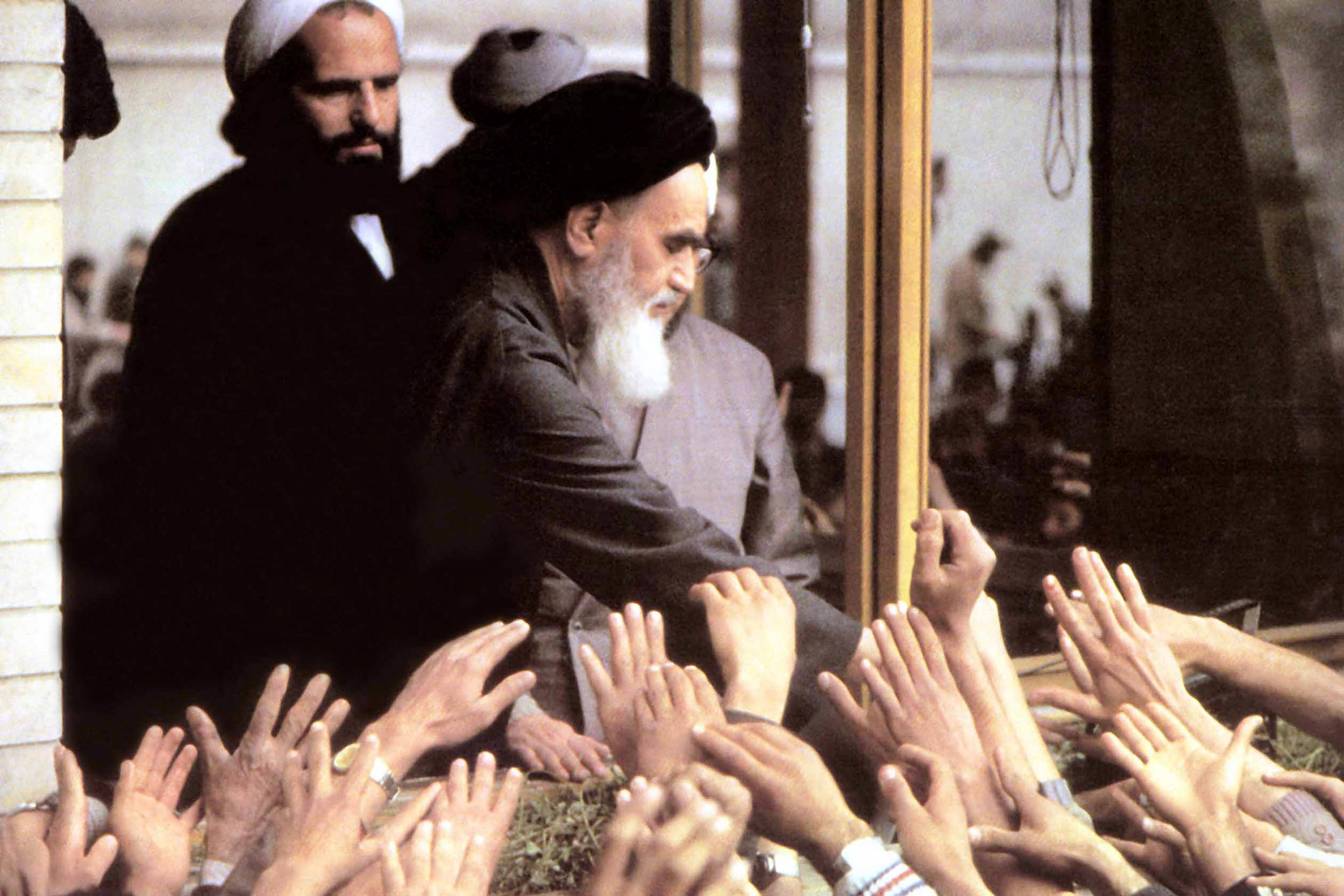
Khomeini at an Islamic high school in Tehran

As part of the pivot from being the guide of a broad political movement to a strict clerical ruler, Khomeini first expressed approval of the provisional constitution for the Islamic Republic that included no position of supreme Islamic clerical ruler. After his supporters gained an overwhelming majority of the seats in the body making final changes in the draft (the Assembly of Experts), they rewrote the proposed constitution to include an Islamic jurist Supreme Leader of the country, and a more powerful Council of Guardians to veto un-Islamic legislation and screen candidates for office, disqualifying those found un-Islamic. The Supreme Leader followed closely but not completely Khomeini ideas in his 1970 book Hokumat-e Islami: Velayat-e faqih (Islamic Government: Governance of the Jurist) that had been distributed to his supporters and kept from the public. In November 1979, the new constitution of the Islamic Republic was adopted by a national referendum. Khomeini himself became instituted as the Supreme Leader of Iran, and officially became known as the "Leader of the Revolution". On 4 February 1980, Abolhassan Banisadr was elected as the first president of Iran. Critics complained that Khomeini had gone back on his word to advise, rather than rule the country.

==== Hostage crisis ====
Before the constitution was approved, on 22 October 1979, the United States admitted the exiled and ailing Shah into the country for cancer treatment. In Iran, there was an immediate outcry, with both Khomeini and leftist groups demanding the Shah's return to Iran for trial and execution. On 4 November, a group of Iranian college students calling themselves the Muslim Student Followers of the Imam's Line took control of the American Embassy in Tehran, holding 52 embassy staff hostage for 444 days, an event known as the Iran hostage crisis. In the United States, the hostage-taking was seen as a flagrant violation of international law and aroused intense anger and anti-Iranian sentiment.

In Iran, the takeover was immensely popular and earned the support of Khomeini under the slogan "America can't do a damn thing against us". The seizure of the embassy of a country he called the "Great Satan" helped to advance the cause of theocratic government and outflank politicians and groups who emphasized stability and normalized relations with other countries. Khomeini is reported to have told his president: "This action has many benefits ... this has united our people. Our opponents do not dare act against us. We can put the constitution to the people's vote without difficulty, and carry out presidential and parliamentary elections." The new constitution was successfully passed by referendum a month after the hostage crisis began.

The crisis had the effect of splitting the opposition into two groups: the radicals supporting the hostage taking, and the moderates opposing it. On 23 February 1980, Khomeini proclaimed Iran's Majlis would decide the fate of the American embassy hostages, and demanded that the United States hand over the Shah for trial in Iran for crimes against the nation. Although the Shah died a few months later, during the summer, the crisis continued. In Iran, supporters of Khomeini named the embassy a "Den of Espionage", publicizing details regarding armaments, espionage equipment and many volumes of official and classified documents which they found there.

=== Relationship with Islamic and non-aligned countries ===
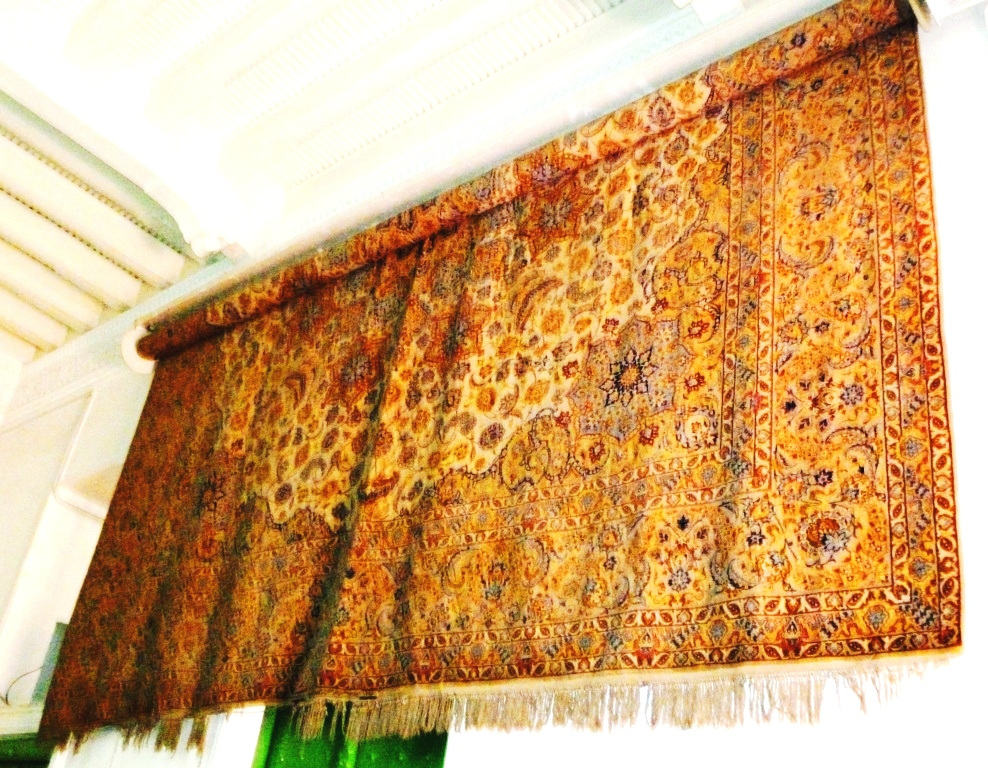
Carpet given to Hotan mosque by Khomeini

Khomeini believed in Muslim unity and solidarity, in the export of his revolution throughout the world, and eventually in "establishing the Islamic state world-wide", one of "the great goals of the revolution." He believed Shia and the significantly more numerous Sunni Muslims should be "united and stand firmly against Western and arrogant powers". He declared the birth week of Muhammad (the week between 12th to 17th of Rabi' al-awwal) as the Unity Week and the last Friday of Ramadan as Quds Day in 1981. (Note: Sunni Muslims believe the birthday of Muhammad was 12th of Rabi' al-awwal, in the Islamic calendar, but many Shia Muslims celebrate the 17th of the month as the date of his birth.)

=== Iran–Iraq War ===
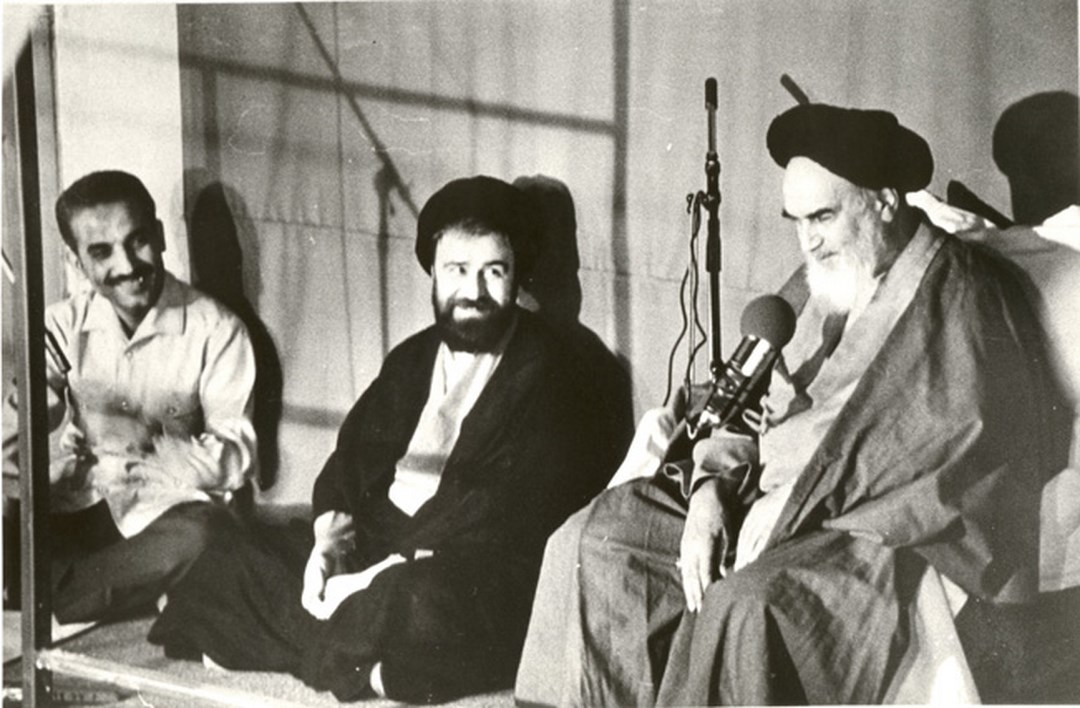
Khomeini with Ahmad Khomeini and Mohammad-Ali Rajai

Shortly after assuming power, Khomeini began calling for Islamic revolutions across the Muslim world, including Iran's Arab neighbor Iraq, the one large state besides Iran with a Shia majority population. At the same time Saddam Hussein, Iraq's secular Sunni Arab nationalist Ba'athist leader, was eager to take advantage of Iran's weakened military and (what he assumed was) revolutionary chaos, and in particular to occupy Iran's adjacent oil-rich province of Khuzestan, and to undermine Iranian Islamic revolutionary attempts to incite the Shi'a majority of his country. In September 1980, Iraq launched a full-scale invasion of Iran, beginning the Iran–Iraq War (September 1980 – August 1988). A combination of fierce resistance by Iranians and military incompetence by Iraqi forces soon stalled the Iraqi advance and, despite Saddam's internationally condemned use of poison gas, Iran had by early 1982 regained almost all of the territory lost to the invasion. The invasion rallied Iranians behind the new regime, enhancing Khomeini's stature and allowing him to consolidate and stabilize his leadership. After this reversal, Khomeini refused an Iraqi offer of a truce, instead demanding reparations and the toppling of Saddam Hussein from power. In 1982, there was an attempted military coup against Khomeini.

Although Iran's population and economy were three times the size of Iraq's, the latter was aided by neighboring Persian Gulf Arab states, as well as the Soviet Bloc and Western countries. The Persian Gulf Arabs and the West wanted to be sure the Islamic revolution did not spread across the Persian Gulf, while the Soviet Union was concerned about the potential threat posed to its rule in central Asia to the north; however, Iran had large amounts of ammunition provided by the United States of America during the Shah's era and the United States secretly and illegally smuggled arms to Iran during the 1980s despite Khomeini's anti-Western policy (see Iran–Contra affair).

During the war, the Iranians used human wave attacks (people walking to certain deaths included child soldiers), with Khomeini promising that they would automatically go to paradise—al Jannah—if they died in battle. Khomeini's pursuit of victory ultimately proved futile. By March 1984, two million of Iran's most educated citizens had left the country. In July 1988, Khomeini, in his words, "drank the cup of poison" and accepted a truce mediated by the United Nations. Despite the high cost of the war, including 450,000 to 950,000 Iranian casualties and US$300 billion, Khomeini insisted that extending the war into Iraq in an attempt to overthrow Saddam had not been a mistake. In a "Letter to Clergy", he wrote that "we do not repent, nor are we sorry for even a single moment for our performance during the war. Have we forgotten that we fought to fulfill our religious duty and that the result is a marginal issue?"

=== Fatwa against Kurdish rebels ===
On 19 August 1979, Khomeini issued a fatwā (juristic ruling) declaring jihad (war) against Kurdish rebel groups, primarily the Democratic Party of Iranian Kurdistan (KDPI) and Komala. The decree followed the Battle of Paveh, where Kurdish militants had besieged government-held positions. Khomeini designated the insurgents as mohareb (those who wage war against God). Following the decree, Revolutionary Judge Sadegh Khalkhali conducted rapid, summary trials in Sanandaj, Paveh, Marivan, Saqqez, and Mahabad resulting in the execution of hundreds of individuals accused of counter-revolutionary activities. According to Amnesty International, approximately 10,000 people were killed during the broader conflict (1979–1983), with thousands sentenced to death in summary proceedings.

=== Fatwa against chemical weapons ===
In an interview with Gareth Porter, Mohsen Rafighdoost, head of the Islamic Revolutionary Guard Corps from 1982 until 1989, insisted Khomeini had opposed his proposal for beginning work on both nuclear and chemical weapons by a fatwa which had never been made public in details of when and how it was issued.

=== Rushdie fatwa ===
Fatwa issued 14 February 1989

I would like to inform all the intrepid Muslims in the world that the author of the book entitled The Satanic Verses, which has been compiled, printed and published in opposition to Islam, the Prophet and the Qur'an, as well as those publishers who were aware of its contents, have been declared madhur el dam [those whose blood must be shed]. I call on all zealous Muslims to execute them quickly, wherever they find them, so that no-one will dare to insult Islam again. Whoever is killed in this path will be regarded as a martyr.

In early 1989, Khomeini issued a fatwā (juristic ruling) calling for the assassination of Salman Rushdie, an India-born British author. Rushdie's book, The Satanic Verses, published in 1988, was alleged to have committed blasphemy against Islam. Khomeini's fatwā required not only Rushdie's execution, but of "all those involved in the publication" of the book.

Khomeini's fatwā was condemned across the Western world by governments on the grounds that it violated the universal human rights of free speech and freedom of religion. The fatwā has also been attacked for violating the rules of fiqh by not allowing the accused an opportunity to defend himself, and because "even the most rigorous and extreme of the classical jurist only require a Muslim to kill anyone who insults the Prophet in his hearing and in his presence."

Rushdie publicly regretted "the distress [The Satanic Verses] occasioned to sincere followers of Islam". The fatwa was followed by a number of killings and attempted killings. Hitoshi Igarashi, the Japanese translator of the book, was stabbed to death in 1991. Rushdie himself and two other translators of the book survived murder attempts, the last (in Rushdie's case) in August 2022. The fatwa and subsequent unrest coincided with a surge in sales for Rushdie's work.

=== Life under Khomeini ===
In a speech on 1 February 1979 delivered to a huge crowd after returning to Iran from exile, Khomeini made a variety of promises to Iranians for his coming Islamic regime: a popularly elected government that would represent the people of Iran and with which the clergy would not interfere. He promised that "no one should remain homeless in this country", and that Iranians would have free telephone, heating, electricity, bus services and free oil at their doorsteps.

Under Khomeini's rule, Iran was Islamized. Sharia was introduced, with the Islamic dress code enforced for both men and women by the Islamic Revolutionary Guards and other Islamic groups. Women were required to cover their hair, and men were forbidden to wear shorts. Alcoholic drinks, most Western movies, and the practice of men and women swimming or sunbathing together were banned. The Iranian educational curriculum was Islamized at all levels with the Islamic Cultural Revolution; this was out thoroughly by the Committee for Islamization of Universities. The broadcasting of any music other than martial or religious on Iranian radio and television was banned by Khomeini in July 1979. The ban lasted 10 years (approximately the rest of his life). According to Janet Afari, "the newly established regime of Ayatollah Khomeini moved quickly to repress feminists, ethnic and religious minorities, liberals, and leftists – all in the name of Islam." Unfortunately in the economic sphere, promised free services did not materialize, and with rising prices, real wages for Iranians fell below a middle-class standard, pushing people into de facto poverty.

==== Women and child rights ====
Khomeini took on extensive and proactive support of the female populace during the ousting of the Shah and his subsequent homecoming, advocating for mainstreaming of women into all spheres of life and even hypothesizing about a woman head of state. Once he returned, his stances on women's rights drastically changed. Khomeini revoked Iran's 1967 divorce law, considering any divorce granted under it invalid. Nevertheless, Khomeini supported women's right to divorce as allowed by Islamic law. Khomeini affirmed the traditional position of rape in Islamic law in which rape by a spouse was not equivalent to rape or zina, under certain circumstances. Several fatwas by him on women's issues include:

- "Issue 2412 – A woman who has entered into a permanent marriage should not go out of the house without her husband's permission, and she should consent to whatever pleasure he wants and not prevent him from sleeping with her without a legitimate excuse. If she obeys the husband in these matters, it is obligatory on the husband to provide her food, clothes, house and other items mentioned in the books, and if he does not provide, he is indebted to the wife, whether he has the ability or not.
- Issue 2413 – If a woman does not obey her husband in the matters mentioned in the previous issue, she is a sinner and has no right to food, clothing, housing, and co-sleeping, but her dowry is not lost.
- Issue 2414 – A man has no right to force his wife to serve the house.
- Issue 2420 – If they did not specify a period of time for giving the dowry at the time of reading the permanent contract, the woman can prevent the husband from sleeping with him before receiving the dowry, whether the husband has the ability to pay the dowry or not. But if she is satisfied with intercourse before taking the dowry and the husband has intercourse with her, she cannot prevent the husband from intercourse without a legitimate excuse."

A mere three weeks after assuming power, under the pretext of reversing the Shah's affinity for westernization and backed by a vocal conservative section of Iranian society, he revoked the divorce law. Under Khomeini the minimum age of marriage was lowered to 15 for boys and 13 for girls, though the average age of women at marriage continued to rise. Laws were passed that continued to allow polygamy, and treated adultery as a high form of criminal offense. The book Tahrir al-Wasilah also addressed sexual practices involving children states: "It is not permissible to engage in sexual intercourse with a spouse—whether in a permanent or temporary marriage—before the age of nine. However, there is no objection to other forms of sexual gratification, such as fondling, embracing, or "tafkhiz" (intercrural contact), even with an infant still at the breast."

Women were compelled to wear veils and the image of Western women was carefully reconstructed as a symbol of impiety. Morality and modesty were perceived as fundamental womanly traits that needed state protection, and concepts of individual gender rights were relegated to women's social rights as ordained in Islam. Fatima was widely presented as the ideal emulatable woman. At the same time, amidst the religious orthodoxy, there was an active effort to rehabilitate women into employment. Female participation in healthcare, education and the workforce increased drastically during his regime. Reception among women of his regime has been mixed. Whilst a section were dismayed at the increasing Islamisation and concurrent degradation of women's rights, others did notice more opportunities and mainstreaming of relatively religiously conservative women.

==== Homosexual persecution ====
Shortly after his accession as supreme leader in February 1979, Khomeini imposed capital punishment on homosexuals. Between February and March, 16 Iranians were executed for offenses related to sexual violations. Khomeini also created the Revolutionary Tribunals. According to historian Ervand Abrahamian, Khomeini encouraged the clerical courts to continue implementing their version of the sharia. As part of the campaign to "cleanse" the society, these courts executed over 100 drug addicts, prostitutes, homosexuals, rapists, and adulterers on the charge of "sowing corruption on earth". According to author Arno Schmitt, "Khomeini asserted that 'homosexuals' had to be exterminated because they were parasites and corruptors of the nation by spreading the 'stain of wickedness.'" In 1979, he had declared that the execution of homosexuals (as well as prostitutes and adulterers) was reasonable in a moral civilization in the same sense as cutting off decayed skin.

==== Transgender rights ====
Being transgender, however, was designated by Khomeini as a sickness that was able to be cured through gender-affirming surgery. Since the mid-1980s, the Iranian government has legalized the practice of sex reassignment surgery (under medical approval) and the modification of pertinent legal documents to reflect the reassigned gender. In 1983, Khomeini passed a fatwa allowing gender reassignment operations as a cure for "diagnosed transsexuals".

==== Emigration and economy ====
Khomeini is said to have stressed "the spiritual over the material". Six months after his first speech he expressed exasperation with complaints about the sharp drop in Iran's standard of living: "I cannot believe that the purpose of all these sacrifices was to have less expensive melons." On another occasion emphasizing the importance of martyrdom over material prosperity, he said: "Could anyone wish his child to be martyred to obtain a good house? This is not the issue. The issue is another world." He also reportedly answered a question about his economic policies by declaring that 'economics is for donkeys'. (Note: Sourced from: The original quote which is part of a speech made in 1979 can be found here: I cannot imagine and no wise person can presume the claim that we spared our bloods so watermelon becomes cheaper. No wise person would sacrifice his young offspring for [say] affordable housing. People [on the contrary] want everything for their young offspring. Human being wants economy for his own self; it would therefore be unwise for him to spare his life in order to improve economy ... Those who keep bringing up economy and find economy the infrastructure of everything –– not knowing what human[ity] means – think of human being as an animal who is defined by means of food and clothes ... Those who find economy the infrastructure of everything, find human beings animals. Animal too sacrifices everything for its economy and economy is its sole infrastructure. A donkey too considers economy as its only infrastructure. These people did not realize what human being [truly] is.) This disinterest in economic policy is said to be "one factor explaining the inchoate performance of the Iranian economy since the revolution." Other factors include the long war with Iraq, the cost of which led to government debt and inflation, eroding personal incomes, and unprecedented unemployment, ideological disagreement over the economy, and "international pressure and isolation" such as US sanctions following the hostage crisis.

Due to the Iran–Iraq War, poverty is said to have risen by nearly 45% during the first six years of Khomeini's rule. Emigration from Iran also developed, reportedly for the first time in the country's history. Since the revolution and war with Iraq, an estimated "two to four million entrepreneurs, professionals, technicians, and skilled craftspeople (and their capital)" have emigrated to other countries.

==== Suppression of opposition ====
Khomeini's strategy to overthrow the shah has been described as assembling a broad coalition of disparate supporters (liberals, moderate Muslims, leftist Muslims, Marxists, poor urban youth, etc.), by never exactly explaining what he was going to do once in power, (and in fact by making promises he could not keep). But having taken power, he not only liquidated the Shah and his apparatus of power, but began to shed his now unwanted (and incompatible) allies one-by-one (the National Democratic Front, the Provisional Government, then president Abolhassan Banisadr and the MeK guerillas, etc.), using as much force as necessary. Eventually only one faction was left—namely merchants of the bazaar, often linked to the political–religious hierarchy, and prospering financially from the new order. In the process many people were killed or had their human rights violated.

Mohammad Reza Shah and his family left Iran and escaped harm but hundreds of former members of the overthrown monarchy and military were executed by firing squads, with exiled critics complaining of "secrecy, vagueness of the charges, the absence of defense lawyers or juries", or the opportunity of the accused "to defend themselves".

In a talk at the Fayzieah School in Qom a few months after his return to Iran (on 30 August 1979), Khomeini threatened his democratic opponents: "Those who are trying to bring corruption and destruction to our country in the name of democracy will be oppressed. They are worse than Bani-Ghorizeh Jews, and they must be hanged. We will oppress them by God's order and God's call to prayer."

The suppression of democrats was followed in later years by larger numbers of the erstwhile revolutionary allies of Khomeini's movement—Marxists and socialists, mostly university students—who opposed the theocratic regime. From 1980 to 1981, the People's Mojahedin Organization of Iran and other opposition groups (including leftist and moderate groups) rallied against the takeover of the Islamic Republic Party through large demonstrations. On Khomeini's order, forces of the Islamic Republic responded by shooting the demonstrators and arresting them, including their leaders. The 1981 Hafte Tir bombing escalated the conflict, leading to increasing arrests, torture, and executions of thousands of Iranians. Targets also included "innocent, non political civilians, such as members of the Baha'i religious minority, and others deemed problematic by the IRP". The number of those executed between 1981 and 1985's "reign of terror" is reported to be between 8,000 and 10,000.

In 1983, the Central Intelligence Agency (CIA) reportedly provided Khomeini with a list of Soviet KGB agents and collaborators operating in Iran, who then executed up to 200 suspects and closed down the Communist Tudeh Party of Iran.

In the 1988 executions of Iranian political prisoners, following the People's Mujahedin of Iran's unsuccessful attack, known as Operation Mersad, against Iran from Iraq and their support of Iraq during the Iran-Iraq war, Khomeini issued an order to judicial officials to judge every Iranian political prisoner (mostly but not all Mujahedin), and kill those judged to be apostates from Islam (mortad) or "waging war on God" (moharebeh). Almost all of those interrogated were killed, 1,000 to 30,000 of them. Because of the large number, prisoners were loaded into forklift trucks in groups of six and hanged from cranes in half-hour intervals.

In 2024, the United Nations Special Rapporteur on Human Rights in Iran published a report in which it categorised the purges under Khomeini, including the 1981–1982 massacres and the 1988 executions, as a genocide of Iran's political and religious minorities.

==== Minority religions ====
Zoroastrians, Jews, and Christians are officially recognized and protected by the government. Shortly after Khomeini's return from exile in 1979, he issued a fatwa ordering that Jews and other minorities (except those of the Baháʼí Faith) be treated well. In power, Khomeini distinguished between Zionism as a secular political movement that employs Jewish symbols and ideals and Judaism as the religion of Moses. Senior government posts were reserved for Muslims. Schools set up by Jews, Christians, and Zoroastrians had to be run by Muslim principals. Conversion to Islam was encouraged by entitling converts to inherit the entire share of their parents or even uncle's estate if their siblings or cousins remained non-Muslim. Iran's non-Muslim population has decreased. For example, the Jewish population in Iran dropped from 80,000 to 30,000. The Zoroastrian population has also decreased, due to suffering from renewed persecution and the revived legal contrasts between a Muslim and Zoroastrian, which mirrors the laws that Zoroastrians experienced under earlier Islamic regimes. The view that Zoroastrians are najis ("unclean") has also been renewed. Four of the 270 seats in Parliament were reserved for each three non-Muslim minority religions, under the Islamic constitution that Khomeini oversaw. Khomeini also called for unity between Sunni and Shi'a Muslims. Sunni Muslims make up 9% of the entire Muslim population in Iran.

One non-Muslim group treated differently were the 300,000 members of the Baháʼí Faith. Starting in late 1979, the new government systematically targeted the leadership of the Baháʼí community by focusing on the Baháʼí National Spiritual Assembly (NSA) and Local Spiritual Assemblies (LSAs); prominent members of NSAs and LSAs were often detained and even executed, and "[s]ome 200 of whom have been executed and the rest forced to convert or subjected to the most horrendous disabilities". Like most conservative Muslims, Khomeini believed Baháʼí to be apostates. (Note: For example, he issued a fatwa stating: It is not acceptable that a tributary [non-Muslim who pays tribute] changes his religion to another religion not recognized by the followers of the previous religion. For example, from the Jews who become Baháʼís nothing is accepted except Islam or execution. From Poll Tax, 8. Tributary conditions, (13), Tahrir al-Vasileh, volume 2, pp. 497–507, Quoted in A Clarification of Questions: An Unabridged Translation of Resaleh Towzih al-Masael by Ayatollah Syed Ruhollah Moosavi Khomeini, Westview Press/ Boulder and London, c1984, p.432) He argued that they were a political rather than a religious movement, declaring that "the Baháʼís are not a sect but a party, which was previously supported by Britain and now the United States. The Baháʼís are also spies just like the Tudeh [Communist Party]."

==== Ethnic minorities ====
In a 1979 speech Khomeini hinted that the new government's attitude towards ethnicity in Iran was to curb differences instead of accept them. Khomeini has been quoted as saying: "Sometimes the word minorities is used to refer to people such as Kurds, Lurs, Turks, Persians, Baluchis, and such. These people should not be called minorities because this term assumes there is a difference between these brothers."

In 1979, before Khommeini had consolidated power, a Kurdish delegation traveled to Qom to present the Kurds' demands to Khomeini. Their demands included language rights and the provision for a degree of political autonomy. Khomeini responded that such demands were unacceptable since it involved the division of the Iranian nation. The following months saw numerous clashes between Kurdish militia groups and the Revolutionary Guards. The referendum on the Islamic Republic was massively boycotted in Kurdistan, where it was thought 85 to 90% of voters abstained. Khomeini ordered additional attacks later on in the year, and by September most of Iranian Kurdistan was under direct martial law.

== Death and funeral ==
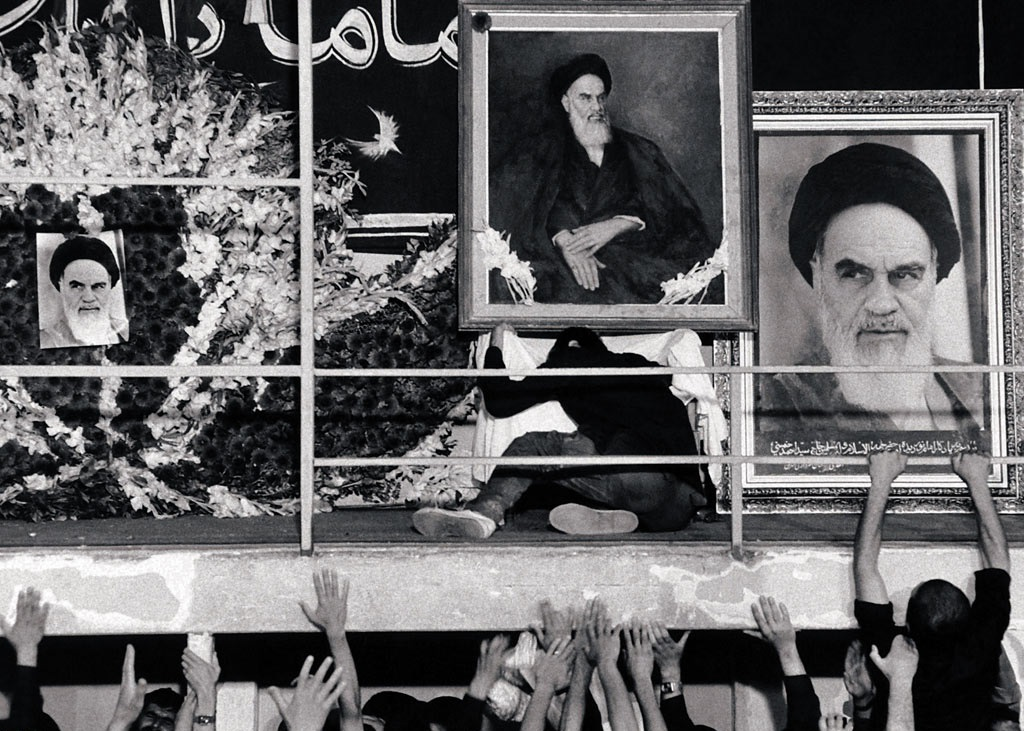
Mourning men in residence of Khomeini around his seat area, Jamaran, 4 June 1989

Khomeini's health declined several years prior to his death. After spending eleven days in Jamaran hospital, he died on 3 June 1989 after suffering five heart attacks in ten days. His daughter confirmed that at the time, he was battling stomach cancer.

Large numbers of Iranians took to the streets to publicly mourn his death and in the scorching summer heat, fire trucks sprayed water on the crowds to cool them. At least 10 mourners were trampled to death, more than 400 were badly hurt and several thousand more were treated for injuries sustained in the ensuing pandemonium.

On 5 June, the coffin with Khomeini's body was put on display in north Tehran allowing hundreds of thousands of mourners to see the body. The next day it was determined that the planned funeral procession to the cemetery would be impossible because several million mourners had gathered and blocked the streets. Eventually after the Salat al-Janazah (funeral prayer) led by Grand Ayatollah Mohammad-Reza Golpaygani, the body was flown by helicopter to the cemetery.

At the cemetery, the crowd surged past the makeshift barriers and the authorities lost control of the events. According to journalist John Kifner of The New York Times:

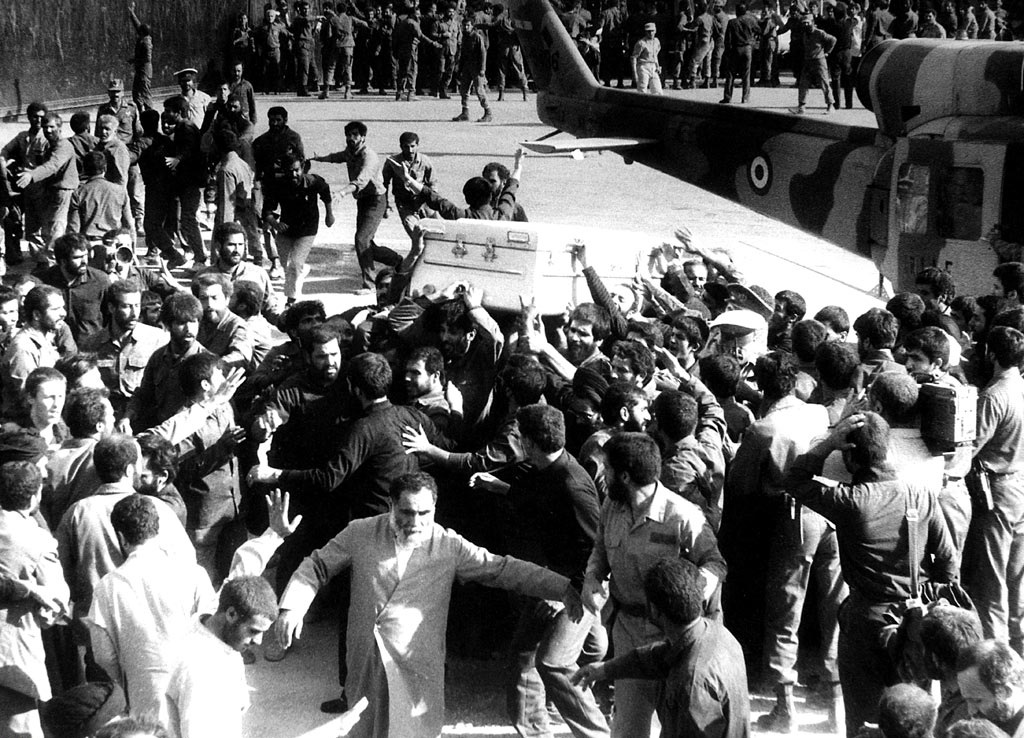
Mourning men pull the coffin with Khomeini's body from the helicopter.

The crowd, much of it made up of Revolutionary Guards detailed to maintain order, pulled the coffin from the helicopter and began parading it around the makeshift compound surrounding the gravesite. As the excitement grew, the body of the Ayatollah, wrapped in a white burial shroud, fell out of the flimsy wooden coffin, and in a mad scene people in the crowd reached to touch the shroud. The soldiers pushed and wrestled, finally firing warning shots, to get the body back. Ayatollah Khomeini's son, Ahmad, was knocked from his feet. But even as the soldiers pushed the body back into the helicopter, the crowd swarmed over the craft, dragging it back down as it tried to take off. Others jumped into the hole dug for the Ayatollah's body. The troops drove the crowd back, finally clearing the compound enough to allow the helicopter to take off, its rotors scattering more mourners.

The second funeral was held under much tighter security five hours later. This time, Khomeini's casket was made of steel, and in accordance with Islamic tradition, the casket was only to carry the body to the burial site. In 1995, his son Ahmad was buried next to him. Khomeini's grave is now housed within a larger mausoleum complex.

=== Succession ===
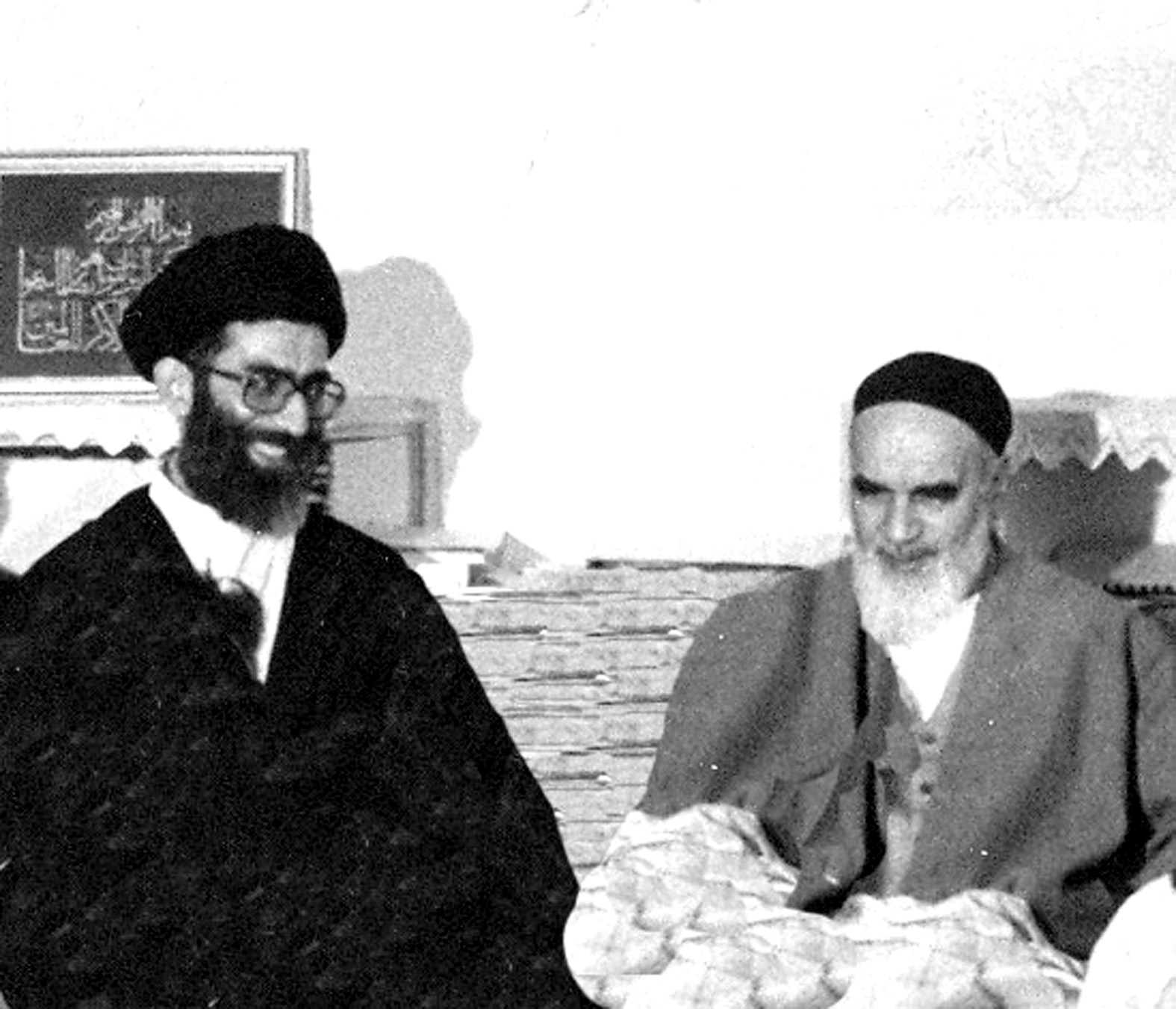
Khomeini and his successor, Ali Khamenei

Grand Ayatollah Hussein-Ali Montazeri, a former student of Khomeini and a major figure of the Revolution, was chosen by Khomeini to be his successor as Supreme Leader and approved as such by the Assembly of Experts in November 1985. The principle of velayat-e faqih and the Islamic constitution called for the Supreme Leader to be a marja (a grand ayatollah), and of the dozen or so grand ayatollahs living in 1981 only Montazeri qualified as a potential Leader (this was either because only he accepted totally Khomeini's concept of rule by Islamic jurists, or, as at least one other source stated, because only Montazeri had the "political credentials" Khomeini found suitable for his successor). The execution of Mehdi Hashemi in September 1987 on charges of counterrevolutionary activities was a blow to Ayatollah Montazeri, who had known Hashemi since their childhood. In early 1989, Montazeri began to call for liberalization, freedom for political parties. Following the execution of thousands of political prisoners by the Islamic government, Montazeri told Khomeini: "Your prisons are far worse than those of the Shah and his SAVAK." After a letter of his complaints was leaked to Europe and broadcast on the BBC, a furious Khomeini ousted him in March 1989 from his position as official successor. His portraits were removed from offices and mosques.

To deal with the disqualification of the only suitable marja, Khomeini called for an "Assembly for Revising the Constitution" to be convened. An amendment was made to Iran's constitution removing the requirement that the Supreme Leader be a Marja and this allowed Ali Khamenei, the new favoured jurist who had suitable revolutionary credentials but lacked scholarly ones and who was not a Grand Ayatollah, to be designated as successor. Ayatollah Khamenei was elected Supreme Leader by the Assembly of Experts on 4 June 1989. Montazeri continued his criticism of the regime and in 1997 was put under house arrest for questioning what he regarded to be an unaccountable rule exercised by the supreme leader.

=== Anniversary ===
The anniversary of Khomeini's death is a public holiday. To commemorate Khomeini, people visit his mausoleum placed on Behesht-e Zahra to hear sermons and practice prayers on his death day.

== Reception, political thought and legacy ==
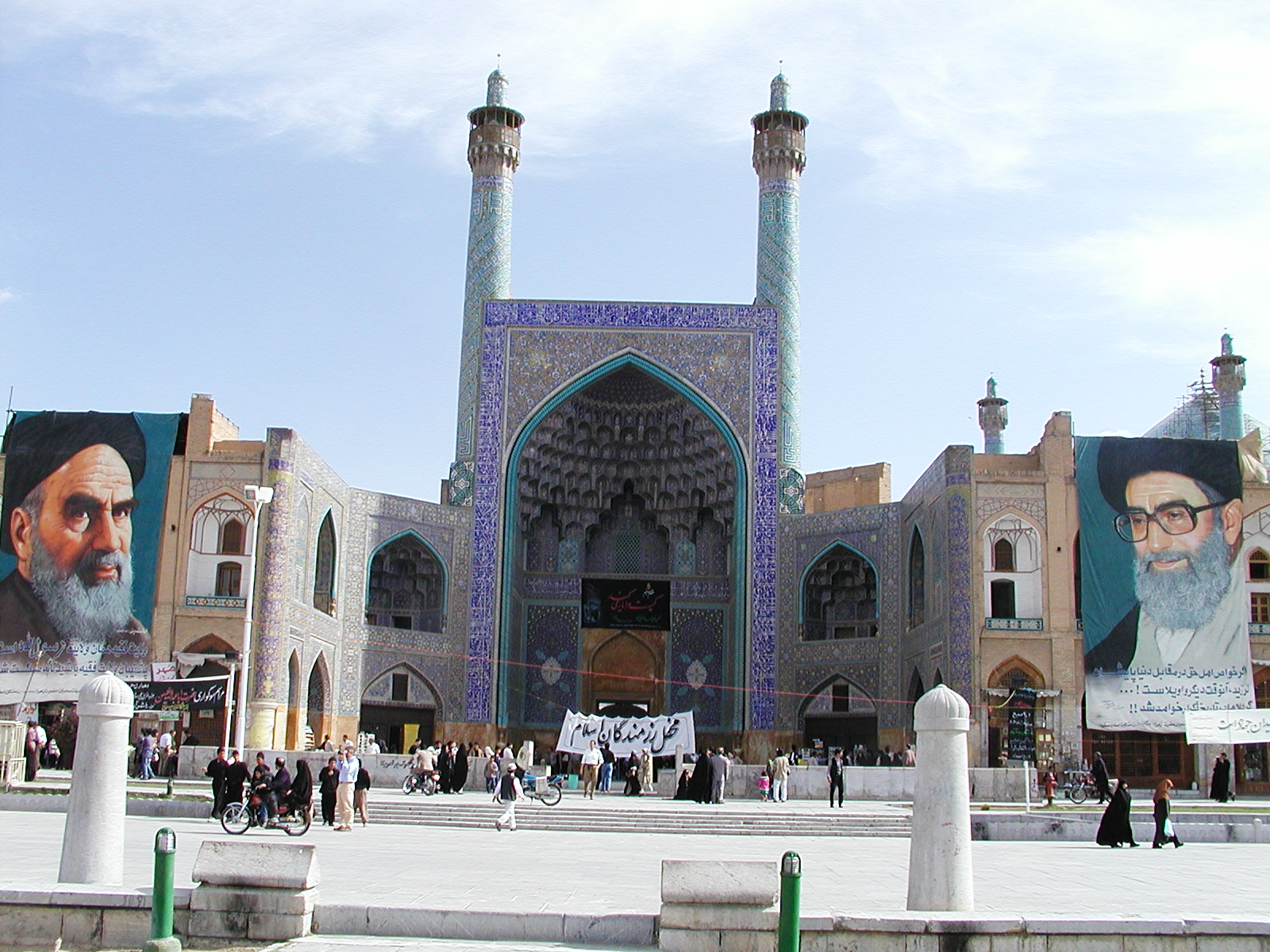
Murals of Khomeini and Ali Khamenei, Shah Mosque in Isfahan

According to at least one scholar (Ali Reza Eshraghi), politics in the Islamic Republic of Iran "are largely defined by attempts to claim Khomeini's legacy" and that "staying faithful to his ideology has been the litmus test for all political activity" there. Throughout his many writings and speeches, Khomeini's views on governance evolved. Originally declaring rule by monarchs or others permissible so long as sharia law was followed, Khomeini later adamantly opposed monarchy, arguing that only rule by a leading Islamic jurist (a marja') would ensure Sharia was properly followed (velâyat-e faqih), before finally insisting the ruling jurist need not be a leading one and Sharia rule could be overruled by that jurist if necessary to serve the interests of Islam and the "divine government" of the Islamic state.

Khomeini's concept of Guardianship of the Islamic Jurist (ولایت فقیه, velayat-e faqih) as Islamic government did not win the support of the leading Iranian Shi'i clergy of the time. Towards the 1979 Revolution, many clerics gradually became disillusioned with the rule of the Shah, although none came around to supporting Khomeini's vision of a theocratic Islamic Republic.

=== Democracy ===
There is much debate so as to whether Khomeini's ideas are or are not compatible with democracy and whether he intended the Islamic Republic to be a democratic republic. According to the state-run Aftab News, both ultraconservative supporters (Mohammad Taghi Mesbah Yazdi) and reformist opponents of the regime (Akbar Ganji and Abdolkarim Soroush) believe he did not while regime officials and supporters, such as Ali Khamenei, Mohammad Khatami, and Mortaza Motahhari, maintain the Islamic republic is democratic as Khomeini intended it to be. Khomeini himself also made statements at different times indicating both support and opposition to democracy. One scholar, Shaul Bakhash, explains this contradiction as coming from Khomeini's belief that the huge turnout of Iranians in anti-Shah demonstrations during the revolution constituted a "referendum" in favor of an Islamic republic, more important than any elections. Khomeini also wrote that since Muslims must support a government based on Islamic law, Sharia-based government will always have more popular support in Muslim countries than any government based on elected representatives.

Khomeini's policies aimed to position Iran as the "champion of all Muslims, regardless of sect", by making Iran the main "hardline opponent" of Israel. Khomeini offered himself as a "champion of Islamic revival" and unity, emphasizing issues Muslims agreed upon—the fight against Zionism and imperialism—and downplaying Shia issues that would divide Shia from Sunni. The Egyptian jihadist ideologue Sayyid Qutb was an important source of influence to Khomeini and the 1979 Iranian Revolution. The Islamic Republic of Iran under Khomeini honoured Qutb's "martyrdom" by issuing an iconic postage stamp in 1984, and before the revolution prominent figures in the Khomeini network translated Qutb's works into Persian. While he publicly spoke of Islamic unity and minimized differences with Sunni Muslims, he is accused by some of privately rebuking Sunni Islam as heretical and covertly promoted an anti-Sunni foreign policy in the region.

=== Public image ===
Khomeini has been lauded as politically astute, a "charismatic leader of immense popularity", a "champion of Islamic revival" by Shia scholars, and a major innovator in political theory and religious-oriented populist political strategy. Khomeini strongly opposed close relations with either Eastern or Western Bloc nations, believing the Islamic world should be its own bloc or rather converge into a single unified power. He viewed Western culture as being inherently decadent and a corrupting influence upon youth. The Islamic Republic banned or discouraged popular Western fashions, music, cinema, and literature.

In the Western world it is said "his glowering visage became the virtual face of Islam in Western popular culture" and "inculcated fear and distrust towards Islam", making the word "Ayatollah" "a synonym for a dangerous madman ... in popular parlance". This has particularly been the case in the United States where some Iranians complained that even at universities, they felt the need to hide their Iranian identity for fear of physical attack. There Khomeini and the Islamic Republic are remembered for the American embassy hostage taking and are accused of sponsoring hostage-taking and terrorist attacks, leading to the American government levying economic sanctions against Iran.

=== Clash with liberals and leftists ===
Before taking power, Khomeini expressed support for the Universal Declaration of Human Rights, saying: "We would like to act according to the Universal Declaration of Human Rights. We would like to be free. We would like independence." Once in power, Khomeini took a firm line against dissent, threatening opponents of theocracy for example: "I repeat for the last time: abstain from holding meetings, from blathering, from publishing protests. Otherwise I will break your teeth."

Prior to the revolution, many of Khomeini's political and religious ideas were considered to be progressive and reformist by leftist intellectuals and activists. Once in power, his ideas often clashed with those of modernist or secular Iranian intellectuals. This conflict came to a head during the writing of the Islamic constitution when many newspapers were closed by the government. Khomeini angrily told the intellectuals: "Yes, we are reactionaries, and you are enlightened intellectuals: You intellectuals do not want us to go back 1400 years. You, who want freedom, freedom for everything, the freedom of parties, you who want all the freedoms, you intellectuals: freedom that will corrupt our youth, freedom that will pave the way for the oppressor, freedom that will drag our nation to the bottom."

=== Third world solidarity ===
In contrast to his alienation from Iranian intellectuals, and "in an utter departure from all other Islamist movements", Khomeini embraced international revolution and Third World solidarity, giving it "precedence over Muslim fraternity". From the time Khomeini's supporters gained control of the media until his death, the Iranian media "devoted extensive coverage to non-Muslim revolutionary movements (from the Sandinistas to the African National Congress and the Irish Republican Army) and downplayed the role of the Islamic movements considered conservative, such as the Afghan mujahidin." Khomeini's supporters and pro-government media in Iran also argue that he was a fighter against racism, as Khomeini was a staunch critic of the Apartheid regime in South Africa. After the 1979 Iranian Revolution, anti-Apartheid activist and African National Congress president Oliver Tambo sent a letter to congratulate Khomeini for the success of the revolution. Former South African President Nelson Mandela stated several times that Khomeini served as an inspiration for the anti-apartheid movement. During the 1979 Iran hostage crisis, Khomeini ordered the release of all female and African-American staff working there.

=== Economics ===
Khomeini's legacy to the economy of the Islamic Republic has been expressions of concern for the mustazafin (a Quranic term for the oppressed or deprived), but not always results that aided them. During the 1990s, the mustazafin and disabled war veterans rioted on several occasions, protesting the demolition of their shantytowns and rising food prices, among others. Khomeini's disdain for the science of economics is said to have been "mirrored" by the populist redistribution policies of former president, Mahmoud Ahmadinejad, who allegedly wears "his contempt for economic orthodoxy as a badge of honour", and has overseen sluggish growth and rising inflation and unemployment.

=== Transsexuality ===
In 1963, Khomeini wrote a book in which he stated that there is no religious restriction on corrective surgery for transgender individuals. At the time Khomeini was an anti-Shah revolutionary and his fatwas did not carry any weight with the imperial government, which did not have any specific policies regarding transgender individuals. After 1979, his fatwa "formed the basis for a national policy" and perhaps in part because of a penal code that "allows for the execution of homosexuals". As of 2005, Iran "permits and partly finances seven times as many gender reassignment operations as the entire European Union".

== Appearance and habits ==
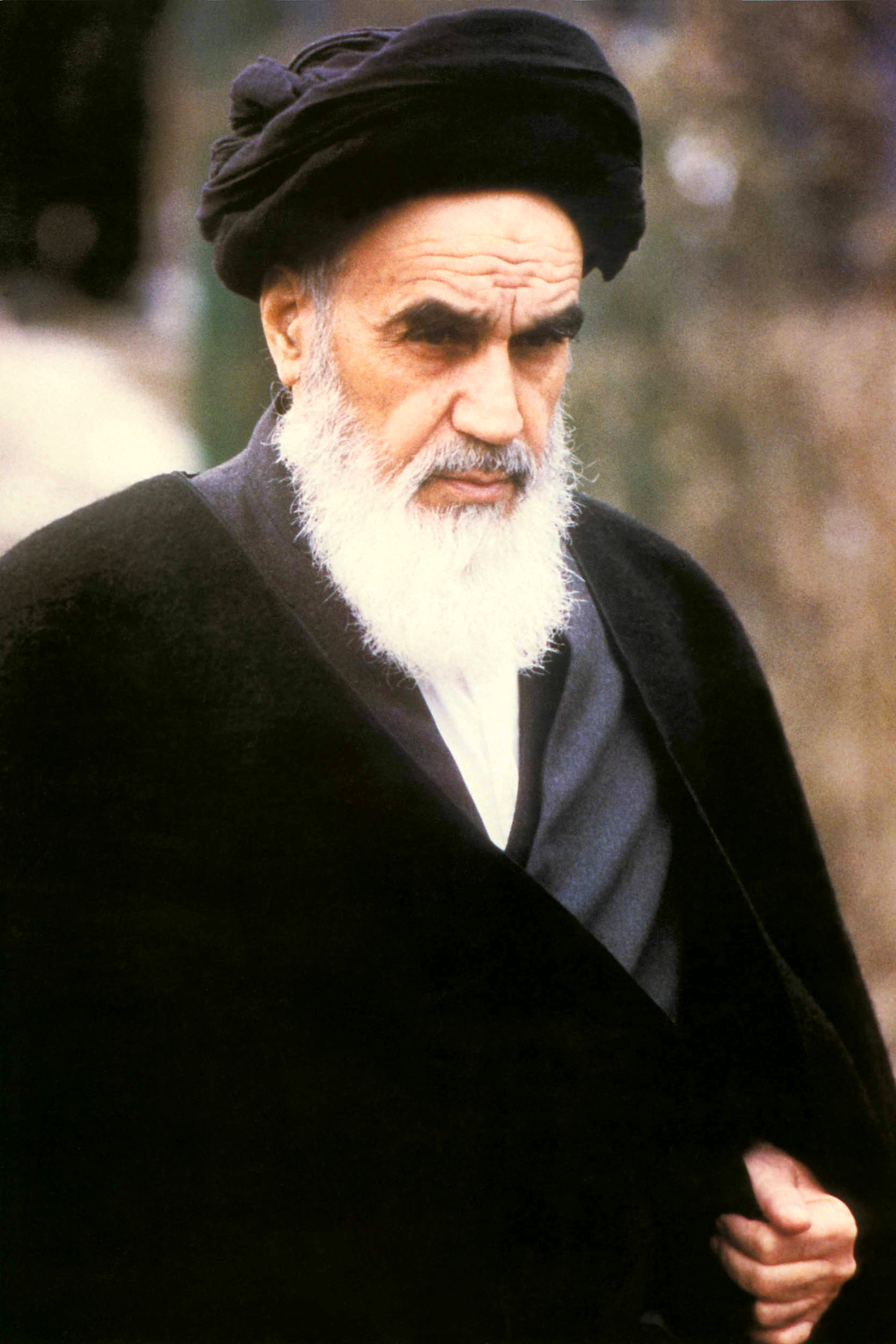
Khomeini in the 1980s

Khomeini was described as "slim", but athletic and "heavily boned". He was also known for his punctuality:

He's so punctual that if he doesn't turn up for lunch at exactly ten past everyone will get worried... He goes to bed exactly on time. He eats exactly on time. And he wakes up exactly on time. He changes his cloak every time he comes back from the mosque.

Khomeini was known for his aloof and austere demeanor. He is said to have had "variously inspired admiration, awe, and fear from those around him." His practice of moving "through the halls of the madresehs never smiling at anybody or anything; his practice of ignoring his audience while he taught, contributed to his charisma." Khomeini adhered to traditional beliefs of Islamic hygienical jurisprudence holding that things like urine, excrement, blood, wine, and also non-Muslims were some of the eleven ritualistically "impure" things that physical contact with which while wet required ritual washing or Ghusl before prayer or salat. He is reported to have refused to eat or drink in a restaurant unless he knew the waiter was a Muslim.

== Mystique ==
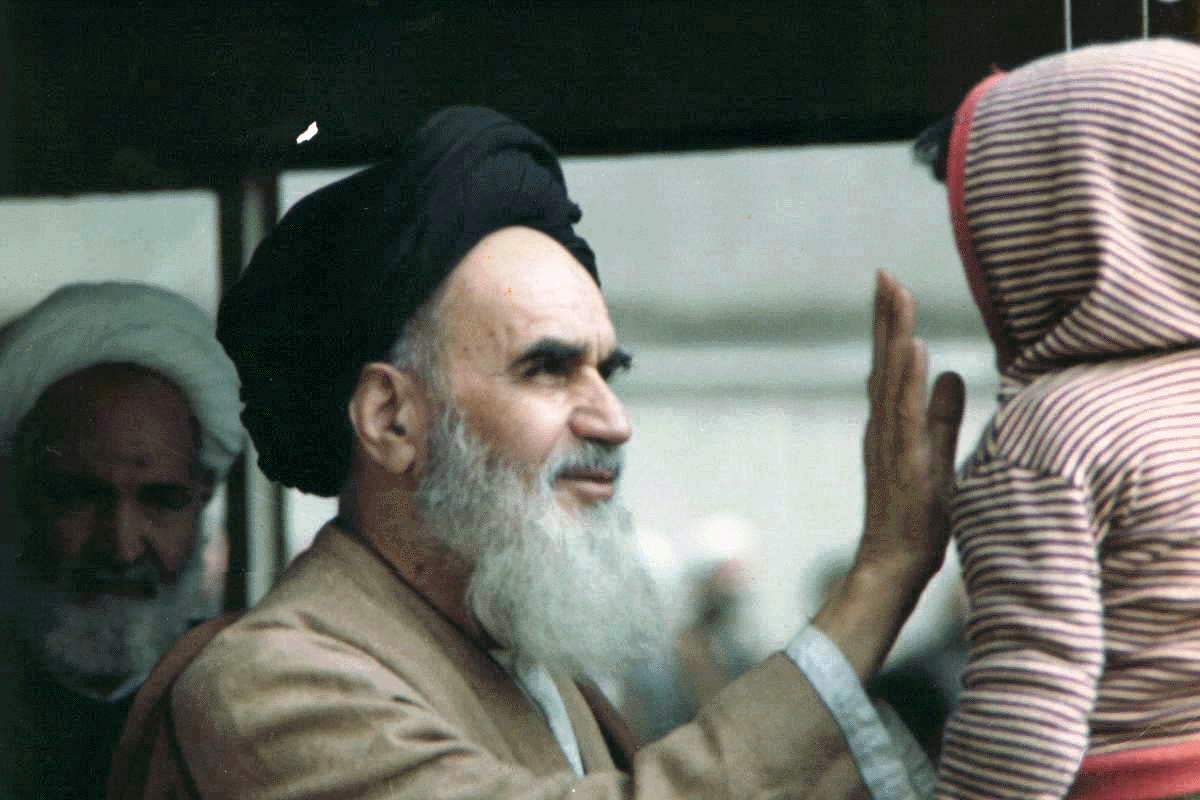
Khomeini and a child, 1978

According to Baqer Moin, with the success of the revolution, not only had a personality cult developed around Khomeini, but he "had been transformed into a semi-divine figure. He was no longer a grand ayatollah and deputy of the Imam, one who represents the Hidden Imam, but simply "The Imam". Khomeini's cult of personality fills a central position in foreign- and domestically targeted Iranian publications. The methods used to create his personality cult have been compared to those used by such figures as Joseph Stalin, Mao Zedong and Fidel Castro. An 8th-century Hadith attributed to the Imam Musa al-Kazim that said "A man will come out of Qom and he will summon people to the right path. There will rally to him people resembling pieces of iron, not to be shaken by violent winds, unsparing and relying on God" was repeated in Iran as a tribute to Khomeini. (In Lebanon, however, this saying was also attributed to Musa al-Sadr.)

Khomeini was the first and only Iranian cleric to be addressed as "Imam", a title hitherto reserved in Iran for the twelve infallible leaders of the early Shi'a. He was also associated with the Mahdi or 12th Imam of Shia belief in a number of ways. One of his titles was Na'eb-e Imam (Deputy to the Twelfth Imam). His enemies were often attacked as taghut and Mofsed-e-filarz, religious terms used for enemies of the Twelfth Imam. Many of the officials of the overthrown Shah's government executed by Revolutionary Courts were convicted of "fighting against the Twelfth Imam". When a deputy in the majlis asked Khomeini directly if he was the "promised Mahdi", Khomeini did not answer, "astutely" neither confirming nor denying the title.

As the revolution gained momentum, even some non-supporters exhibited awe towards Khomeini, calling him "magnificently clear-minded, single-minded and unswerving". His image was as "absolute, wise, and indispensable leader of the nation":

The Imam, it was generally believed, had shown by his uncanny sweep to power that he knew how to act in ways which others could not begin to understand. His timing was extraordinary, and his insight into the motivation of others, those around him as well as his enemies, could not be explained as ordinary knowledge. This emergent belief in Khomeini as a divinely guided figure was carefully fostered by the clerics who supported him and spoke up for him in front of the people.

Even many secularists who firmly disapproved of his policies were said to feel the power of his "messianic" appeal. Comparing him to a father figure who retains the enduring loyalty even of children he disapproves of, journalist Afshin Molavi writes that defenses of Khomeini are "heard in the most unlikely settings":

A whiskey-drinking professor told an American journalist that Khomeini brought pride back to Iranians. A women's rights activist told me that Khomeini was not the problem; it was his conservative allies who had directed him wrongly. A nationalist war veteran, who held Iran's ruling clerics in contempt, carried with him a picture of 'the Imam'.

Another journalist tells the story of listening to bitter criticism of the regime by an Iranian who tells her of his wish for his son to leave the country and who "repeatedly" asserts "life had been better" under the Shah. When his complaint is interrupted by news that "the Imam" – over 85 years old at the time and known to be ailing – might be dying, the critic becomes "ashen faced" and speechless, pronouncing the news to be "terrible for my country". Non-Iranians were not immune from the effect. In 1982, after listening to a half-hour-long speech on the Quran by him, a Muslim scholar from South Africa, Sheikh Ahmad Deedat gushed:

... the electric effect he had on everybody, his charisma, was amazing. You just look at the man and tears come down your cheek. You just look at him and you get tears. I never saw a more handsome old man in my life, no picture, no video, no TV could do justice to this man, the handsomest old man I ever saw in my life was this man.

== Family and descendants ==
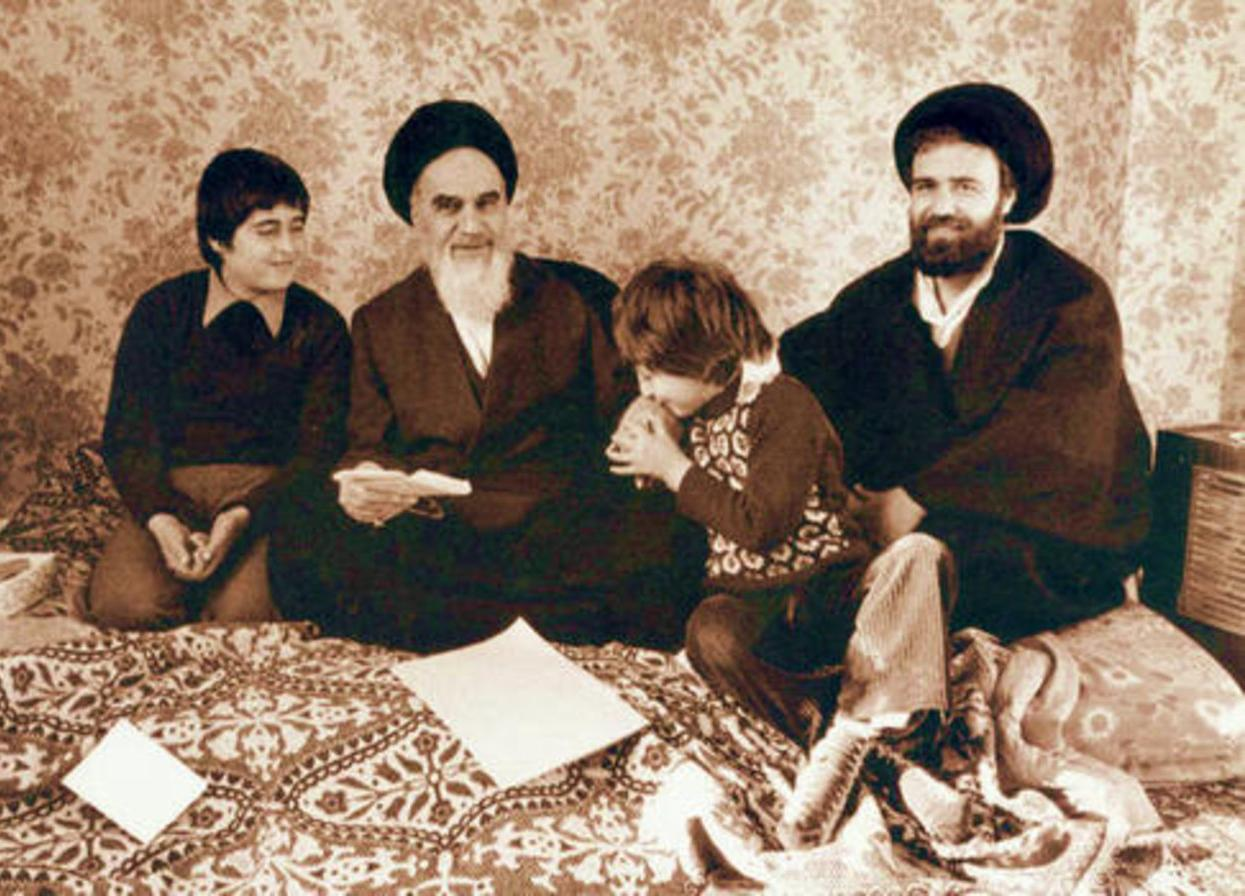
Khomeini with son (Ahmad) and grandsons (Hassan and left side Ali Eshraghi)

In 1929, or possibly 1931, Khomeini married Khadijeh Saqafi, the daughter of a cleric in Tehran. Some sources report that Khomeini married Saqafi when she was ten years old, while others state that she was fifteen. By all accounts, their marriage was harmonious and happy. She died on 21 March 2009 at the age of 93. They had seven children, though only five survived infancy. His daughters all married into either merchant or clerical families, and both his sons entered into religious life. Mostafa, the elder son, died in 1977 while in exile in Najaf, Iraq with his father and was rumored by supporters of his father to have been murdered by SAVAK. Ahmad Khomeini, who died in 1995 at the age of 50, was also rumoured to be a victim of foul play but this time at the hands of Ali Khamenei's regime. Zahra Mostafavi, a professor at the University of Tehran and still alive, is perhaps his "most prominent daughter".

Khomeini's fifteen grandchildren include:

- Zahra Eshraghi, granddaughter, married to Mohammad-Reza Khatami, head of the Islamic Iran Participation Front, the main reformist party in the country, and is considered a pro-reform character herself.
- Hassan Khomeini, Khomeini's elder grandson, son of Ahmad Khomeini, is a cleric and the trustee of the Mausoleum of Khomeini and also has shown support for the reform movement in Iran, and Mir-Hossein Mousavi's call to cancel the 2009 election results.
- Husain Khomeini, Khomeini's other grandson, son of Sayid Mustafa Khomeini, is a mid-level cleric who is strongly against the system of the Islamic republic. In 2003, he was quoted as saying: "Iranians need freedom now, and if they can only achieve it with American interference, I think they would welcome it. As an Iranian, I would welcome it." In that same year Husain Khomeini visited the United States, where he met figures such as Reza Pahlavi, the son of the last Shah and the pretender to the Sun Throne. Later that year, Husain returned to Iran after receiving an urgent message from his grandmother. According to Michael Ledeen, quoting "family sources", he was blackmailed into returning. In 2006, he called for an American invasion and overthrow of the Islamic Republic, telling Al-Arabiyah television station viewers: "If you were a prisoner, what would you do? I want someone to break the prison [doors open]."
- Another of Khomeini's grandchildren, Ali Eshraghi, was disqualified from the 2008 parliamentary elections on grounds of being insufficiently loyal to the principles of the Islamic revolution but was later reinstated.

== Bibliography ==
Khomeini was a writer and speaker (200 of his books are online) who authored commentaries on the Quran, on Islamic jurisprudence, the roots of Islamic law, and Islamic traditions. He also released books about philosophy, gnosticism, poetry, literature, government, and politics. His books include:

- Hokumat-e Islami: Velayat-e faqih (Islamic Government: Governance of the Jurist)
- Forty Hadith (Forty Traditions)
- Adab as Salat (The Disciplines of Prayers)
- Jihade Akbar (The Greater Struggle)
- Tahrir al-Wasilah (Exegesis of the Means of Salvation or Commentaries on the Liberation of the Intercession)
- Kashf al-Asrar

== See also ==
- 1979 Iranian Revolution conspiracy theory
- Abdallah Mazandarani
- Execution of Imam Khomeini's Order
- Exiles of Imam Khomeini
- Fazlullah Nouri
- Ideocracy
- Islamic fundamentalism in Iran
- Islamic Government (book by Khomeini)
- Khomeinism
- List of cults of personality
- Mirza Ali Aqa Tabrizi
- Mirza Husayn Tehrani
- Mirza Sayyed Mohammad Tabatabai
- Mohammad Baqir al-Hakim
- Muhammad Baqir al-Sadr
- Muhammad Kazim Khurasani
- Political thought and legacy of Ruhollah Khomeini
- Ruhollah Khomeini's letter to Mikhail Gorbachev
- Ruhollah Khomeini's residency (Jamaran)
- Seyyed Abdollah Behbahani
- Supreme Leader of Iran
- Kartir

== Sources ==
- Ansari, Hamid. The Narrative of Awakening. The Institute for Compilation and publication of the work of Imam Khomeini. Archived from the original on 14 May 2015.
- Bakhash, Shaul (1984). The Reign of the Ayatollahs: Iran and the Islamic Revolution. Basic Books.
- Brumberg, Daniel (2001). Reinventing Khomeini: The Struggle for Reform in Iran. University of Chicago Press. ISBN 0-226-07758-6.
- Choksy, Jamsheed K. (2015). "Zoroastrianism ii. Historical Review: from the Arab Conquest to Modern Times". Encyclopædia Iranica.
- Dabashi, Hamid (2006). Theology of Discontent: The Ideological Foundation of the Islamic Revolution in Iran. Transaction Publishers. ISBN 1-4128-0516-3.
- Daniel, Elton L. (2001). The History of Iran. Greenwood Publishing Group. ISBN 0-313-30731-8.
- DeFronzo, James (2007). Revolutions And Revolutionary Movements. Westview Press. ISBN 978-0-8133-4354-9.
- Harney, Desmond (1998). The priest and the king: an eyewitness account of the Iranian revolution. I.B. Tauris.
- Hoveyda, Fereydoun (2003). The Shah and the Ayatollah: Iranian Mythology and Islamic Revolution. Praeger/Greenwood. ISBN 0-275-97858-3.
- Karsh, Efraim (2007). Islamic Imperialism: A History. Yale University Press. ISBN 978-0-300-12263-3.
- Keddie, Nikkie R. (2003). Modern Iran: Roots and Results of Revolution. Yale University Press. ISBN 0-300-09856-1.
- Khomeini, Ruhollah; Algar, Hamid (2002). Islamic Government: Governance of the Jurist. Alhoda UK. ISBN 964-335-499-7.
- Khomeini, Ruhollah (1981). Islam and Revolution: Writing and Declarations of Imam Khomeini. Hamid Algar (translator and annotator). Mizan Press.
- Khomeini, Ruhollah (1980). Sayings of the Ayatollah Khomeini: political, philosophical, social, and religious. Bantam.
- Lee, James (1984). The Final Word!: An American Refutes the Sayings of Ayatollah Khomeini. Philosophical Library. ISBN 0-8022-2465-2.
- Mackey, Sandra (1996). The Iranians: Persia, Islam and the Soul of a Nation. Dutton. ISBN 0-525-94005-7.
- Milani, Mohsen M. (1994). The Making of Iran's Islamic Revolution: From Monarchy to Islamic Republic. Westview Press. ISBN 0-8133-8476-1.
- Moin, Baqer (2000). Khomeini: Life of the Ayatollah. St. Martin's Press. ISBN 0-312-26490-9.
- Molavi, Afshin (2005). The Soul of Iran: a Nation's Journey to Freedom. New York: Norton paperbacks.
- Rāhnamā, 'Ali (1994). Pioneers of Islamic Revival. Macmillan. ISBN 1-85649-254-0.
- Reich, Bernard (1990). Political Leaders of the Contemporary Middle East and North Africa: A Biographical Dictionary. Greenwood Publishing Group. ISBN 0-313-26213-6.
- Schirazi, Asghar (1997). The Constitution of Iran. I.B. Tauris.
- Taheri, Amir (1985). The Spirit of Allah. Adler & Adler.
- Willett, Edward C. (2004). Ayatollah Khomeini. Rosen Publishing. ISBN 0-8239-4465-4.
- Wright, Robin (1989). In the Name of God: The Khomeini Decade. Simon & Schuster. ISBN 978-0-671-67235-5.
- Wright, Robin (2000). The Last Revolution. Knopf.

Political offices
Preceded by New title	Supreme Leader of Iran; 1979–1989	Succeeded by Ali Khamenei
Military offices
Preceded by Abolhassan Banisadr	Commander-in-Chief of the Iranian Armed Forces; 1981–1989	Succeeded by Ali Khamenei
