= Reactions to the 2016 Brussels bombings =

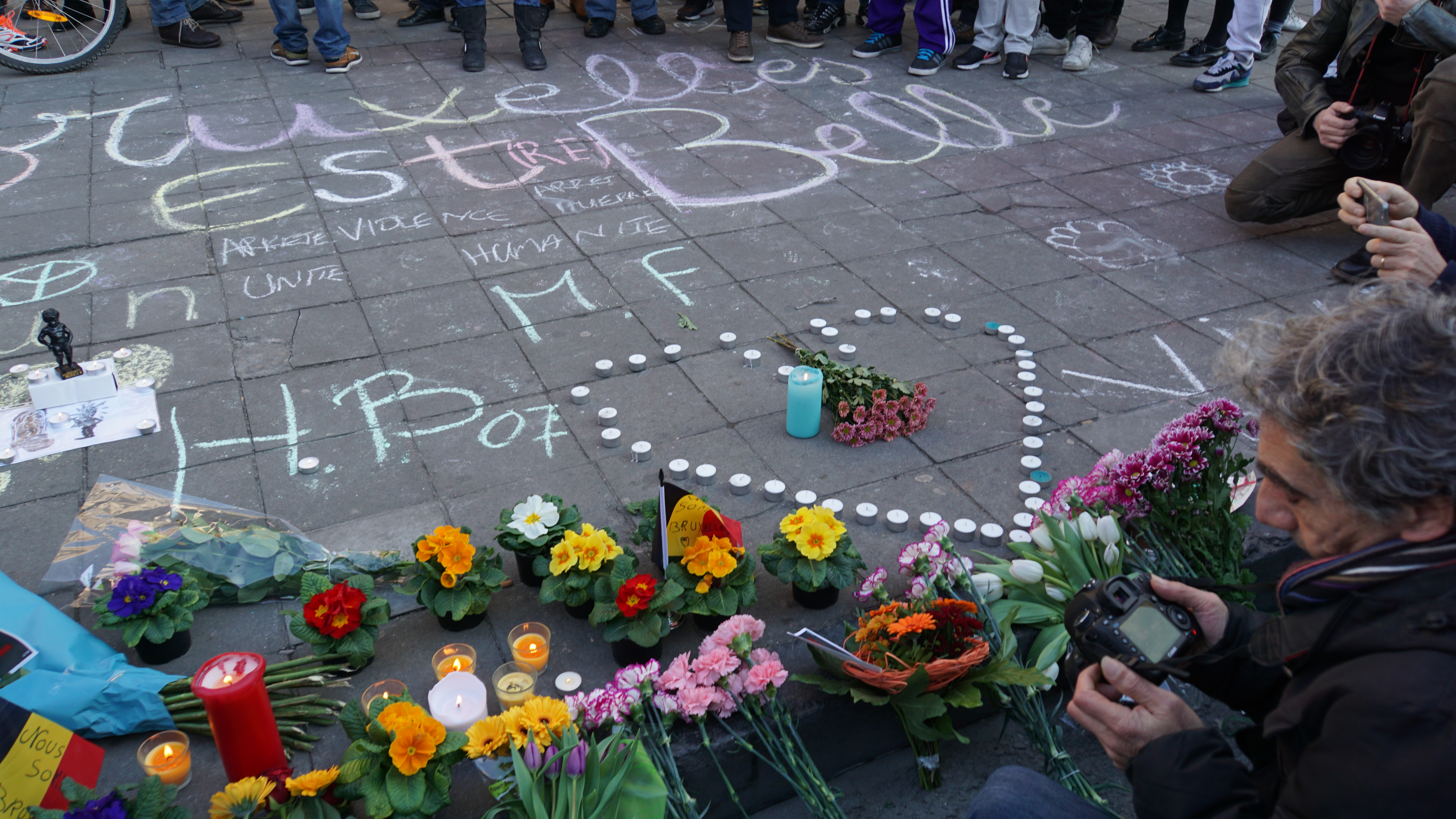
People gathered in Brussels's Place de la Bourse to leave chalk messages and other tributes to the victims

A number of countries, national leaders and international organisations expressed comments or lit monuments in reaction to the 2016 Brussels bombings.

== International response ==
=== International bodies ===
- African Union: Chairperson Nkosazana Dlamini-Zuma said "strongly condemns the despicable attacks at the Zaventem Airport and the central metro station in Brussels, claiming dozens of lives of innocent civilians and leaving scores wounded". Dlamini-Zuma expressed the AU's solidarity with the government and people of Belgium, offering her condolences to the bereaved families and wished speedy recovery to the wounded.
- Association of Southeast Asian Nations: "ASEAN member states strongly condemn the attacks and expresses its deep sympathies and condolences to the government and people of Belgium as well to the families of the victims involved. ASEAN fully supports the efforts of the Belgian government to return the situation to normalcy as soon as possible and bringing the perpetrators to justice."
- European Union: President of the European Council Donald Tusk called the attacks "another low by the terrorists in the service of hatred and violence."
- NATO: The Secretary General of NATO, Jens Stoltenberg expressed his condolences and said he was "deeply saddened by the attacks here in Brussels this morning." He also said that the organization had "decided to increase the alert state at NATO Headquarters."
- Organisation of Islamic Cooperation: The OIC Secretary General Iyad Ameen Madani strongly condemned the terrorist attacks and reaffirmed OIC's unwavering solidarity and support to Belgium.
- United Nations: The Secretary-General of the United Nations, Ban Ki-moon condemns the attack and called it "despicable". He also extends his "heartfelt condolences to the victims and their families, and expresses his solidarity with the people and Government of Belgium."

=== UN member and observer states or entities ===
- Afghanistan: Chief Executive of Afghanistan, Abdullah Abdullah, said "I strongly condemn the explosions in Brussels. I offer my sympathies condolences to those affected by these incidents."
- Albania: Prime Minister Edi Rama said that the attacks "will not stop Europe to win in the name of freedom this war."
- Argentina: President Mauricio Macri condemned the attacks saying, "I repudiate these bloody attacks and ratify our commitment in the fight against terrorism".
- Armenia: President Serzh Sargsyan expressed his condolences and declared that "Armenia strongly condemns any act of terrorism, and it is committed to contribute to the international fight against this evil".
- Australia: Sir Peter Cosgrove, the Governor-General of Australia stated that "We stand with the Belgian people tonight following the senseless devastating attacks and loss of lives" Prime Minister Malcolm Turnbull said he was deeply concerned by the attacks in Brussels, expressing "Australians' thoughts, prayers & solidarity are with the people of Belgium."
- Azerbaijan: President Ilham Aliyev expressed his condolences: "We were deeply saddened by the news of heavy casualties and injuries as a result of explosions in the city of Brussels."
- Bahamas: Government of the Bahamas expressed condolences of the people of Bahamas to Belgian people and extends deep condolences and regret to Belgian Government.
- Bahrain: Ministry of Foreign Affairs "affirms the support of the Kingdom of Bahrain for the Kingdom of Belgium, in facing violence, extremism and terrorism whatever its source or motivation." "It expresses its sincere condolences and sympathies to the families and relatives of the victims and wishes a speedy recovery to all the injured in these treacherous terrorist acts that contravene religion principles and all ethic and human values."
- Bangladesh: Prime Minister Sheikh Hasina said "Bangladesh strongly condemns these acts of terror and stands in solidarity with the people and the government of the Kingdom of Belgium. I believe that terrorists are terrorists irrespective of their colour, creed or religion and have no place in any civilized society". She also added "Our thoughts, sympathies and prayers are with the members of the families who have lost their near and dear ones. May the departed souls rest in eternal peace".
- Belarus: Minister of Foreign Affairs Vladimir Makei expressed their condolences to the victims of the terrorist attacks in the Belgian capital, relatives and friends of the victims and said that Belarus strongly condemns any form of terrorism.
- Belgium: Philippe, King of the Belgians, gave an address on national television. King Philippe expressed his and his wife's sorrow at the events and offered their full support to members of the emergency and security services. As well as their gratitude to all those who spontaneously offer their help.
- Bosnia and Herzegovina: Prime Minister Denis Zvizdić sent a telegram of condolence to Prime Minister of Belgium Charles Michel. "On behalf of the Council of Ministers of BIH, and my own, I offer sincere condolences to you, Belgian people, and to families of the victims. We were deeply moved by this morning’s terrific news on a series of terrorist attacks in Brussels."
- Botswana: Botswana condemned terrorist attacks in Brussels, saying the "heinous acts" caused untold carnage among the innocent civilian population as well as destruction to property. Botswana government said the spate of terrorist attacks was "a painful reminder of the atrocities which were carried out in Paris in November 2015."
- Brazil: The Itamaraty (Ministry of Foreign Affairs of Brazil) expressed its dismay and condemned in the strongest terms the cowardly terrorist attacks that occurred in Brussels. The Brazilian government expressed solidarity with the families of the victims and to the people and government of Belgium, and reiterated its unshakable conviction that every terrorist act deserves unanimous condemnation of the international community, whatever their motives and origin. The Consulate General of Brazil in Brussels is working on enhanced duty regime to help friends and families seeking information on Brazilian.
- Bulgaria: President Rossen Plevneliev sent condolences to the people of Belgium: "The Republic of Bulgaria strongly condemns these acts of violence. Such acts against civilians cannot be justified under any circumstances." Prime Minister Boyko Borissov also issued a statement condemning the bombing, calling for "solidarity" throughout Europe.

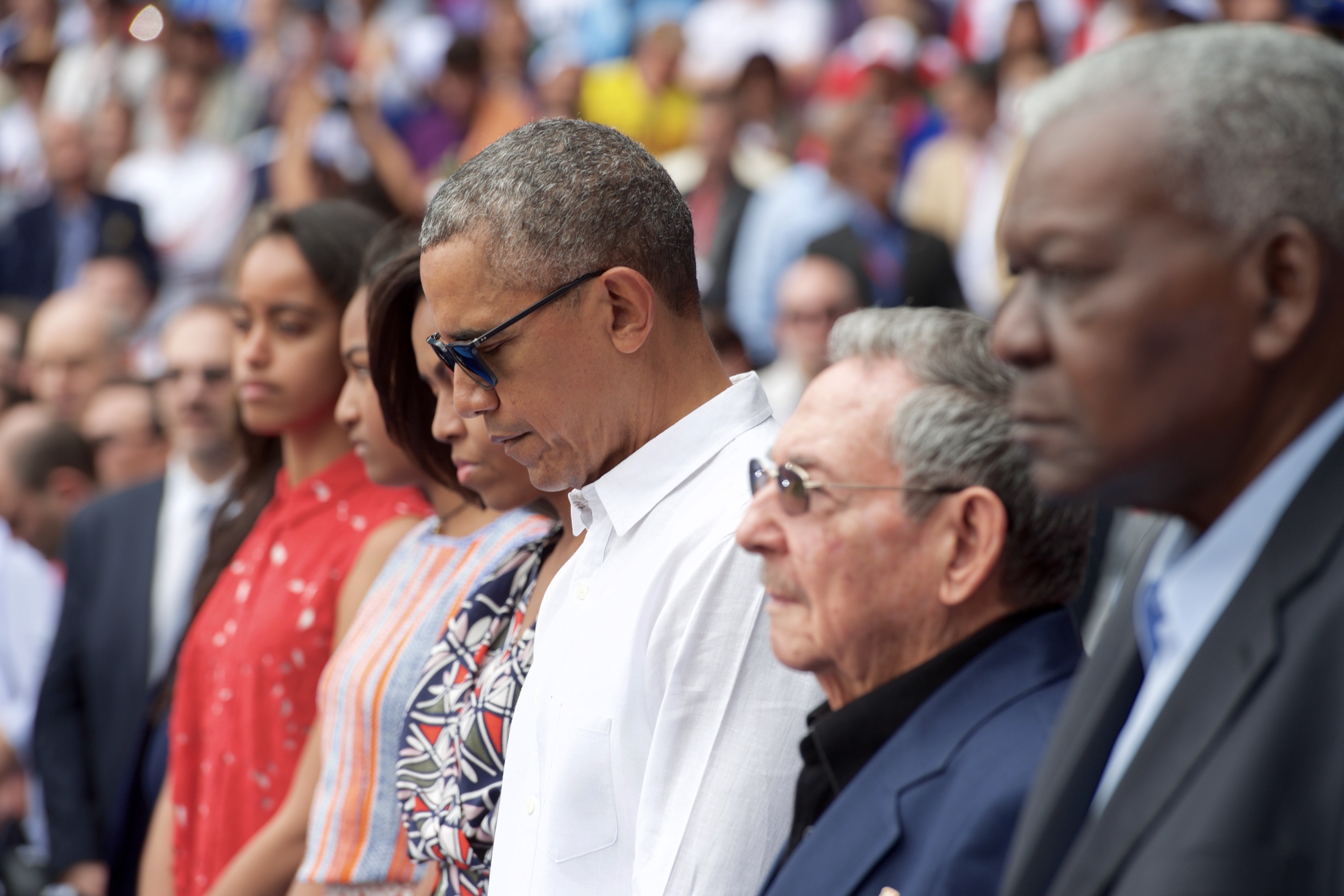
Cuban president Raúl Castro and the visiting Obama family observing a minute of silence at a Baseball game.

- Canada: Prime Minister Justin Trudeau condemned the "deplorable" attacks in Brussels and expressed his solidarity with Belgium and the European Union.
- Chile: President Michelle Bachelet said "I, personally and on behalf of the people of Chile, expressing the deepest regret for what happened this morning in Brussels, where innocent people were killed and many are injured product detonating bombs at the airport and Metro stations. ... We sent from Chile our condolences to the families of those killed and injured in these cowardly attacks and our support to the Government of Belgium. ... We condemn and reject all forms of violence and terrorism, which serve only to submit our coexistence fear and unreason. I'm sure this action against a few, the whole world will respond with justice and solidarity for peace to triumph over hatred."
- China: Foreign Ministry Spokeswoman Hua Chunying said that China "strongly condemns" the attacks on Brussels and "firmly opposes terrorism in all forms".
- Colombia: President Juan Manuel Santos expressed his solidarity with the people of Belgium and referred to the attacks as "condemnable acts of terrorism." The Government of Colombia, through its Ministry of Foreign Affairs, released a statement condemning the attacks and expressing its solidarity with the people and Government of Belgium. In the statement Colombia stated that "Terrorism is a threat for all of our societies, and the union in the international community is fundamental to act properly against this violent acts that generate insecurity, uncertainty, and great pain."
- Costa Rica: President Luis Guillermo Solís said "I condemn the brutal terrorist attack in Brussels. Such barbaric act that has no justification except the rejection of the highest and most sacred values of the human family for their perpetrators seriously injured international peace and security." He also said on behalf of his country, the "feeling of solidarity and mourning" to the Belgian people and the authorities of that country and the European Union (EU) in general.
- Croatia: Both President Kolinda Grabar-Kitarović and Prime Minister Tihomir Orešković extended their condolences. Grbar-Kitarović sent a notice to King Philippe stating that she was, "deeply shocked by the attacks and the loss of many lives in Brussels". Orešković said that the attacks, "were not just and attack on Belgium, but an attack on Europe and all those who fight against terrorism".
- Czech Republic: Prime Minister Bohuslav Sobotka condemned the "brutal and inhuman attack" and visited Belgian embassy in Prague where he laid flowers and signed a book of condolences. MPs in the Chamber of Deputies, lower house of the Parliament, held a minute of silence for the victims of the bombings.
- Cyprus: President Nicos Anastasiades expressed his condolences, stating "Our thoughts and prayers are with the people of Belgium and with the families of those killed or injured by the heinous terrorist attacks."
- Denmark: Prime Minister Lars Løkke Rasmussen condemned the bombings, calling them "despicable", and said that his thoughts were with the victims and their families.
- East Timor: The East Timorese government expresses its solidarity with the government and people of Belgium and condemning the attacks by labelling it as "unacceptable criminal acts of violence".
- Ecuador: "The Foreign Ministry of Ecuador, on behalf of the Government and people of Ecuador expresses its most energetic rejection of the attacks this morning at the airport and in the Brussels metro". Ecuador extended "deepest condolences" to the people and Government Belgian and expressed its solidarity with the families of the victims and the wounded "in this despicable event."
- Egypt: Ministry of Foreign Affairs condemned in the "strongest terms" Brussels attacks. Spokesman of Foreign Ministry said "The time has come for the world to make a final stand to deal with the phenomenon of international terrorism that targets the security and stability of peoples around the world, and that seeks to undermine all human civilization."
- El Salvador: Ministry of Foreign Affairs strongly condemned the terrorist bombings that took place in Brussels, Belgium, and expressed solidarity with the people and the Belgian Government for the victims of the attack. Government extends its condolences to the families of the deceased; also expects the speedy recovery of those injured, and expressed the hope that shortly tranquility is restored in that country.
- Estonia: Prime Minister Taavi Rõivas said "We are all deeply shocked by the terror attacks that took place in Brussels," "There is one goal to these deadly and vile attacks: to sow fear." "We will not surrender to fear. Also when the heart of Europe is hit. Estonia is with Belgium and the rest of Europe in standing up against terror." Prime Minister offered his sympathies to the victims' next of kin.
- Ethiopia: Ethiopia's Ministry of Foreign Affairs on Wednesday condemned the "cowardly and barbaric terrorist attacks". The Ministry also expressed its condolences to the people and government of Belgium and especially to the bereaved families of the victims of these attacks. It also wished a speedy recovery to all those injured in the attacks.
- Fiji: Foreign Affairs Minister Ratu Inoke Kubuabola sent his condolences and wrote that "his thoughts and prayers are with families of those who lost loved ones or have been injured at despicable terrorist attacks in Brussels."
- Finland: President Sauli Niinistö, Prime Minister Juha Sipilä and Finance Minister Alexander Stubb have offered condolences to the Belgian people. President said: "Finland unequivocally condemns all forms of terrorism. On behalf of the people of Finland, I express my deepest sympathy for the families of the victims and for the people of Belgium." Prime Minister said: "The news about the explosions in Brussels is shocking. A strike at the heart of the EU affects us all. My sincere condolences to the friends and family of the victims." Finance Minister said: "Shocked to hear about the explosions at Brussels Airport. Condolences to the victims and their families."
- France: President François Hollande said that the Brussels bombings was an attack on all of Europe and that France will continue the fight against terrorism both on the international and domestic level. Mayor of Paris, Anne Hidalgo announced that the Eiffel Tower would be illuminated in the Belgian national colours on the evening of 22 March 2016. French Prime Minister Manuel Valls said, "We are at war."
- Georgia: The Georgian Ministry of Foreign Affairs stated that it was shocked by the "barbaric terrorist acts" in Belgium's capital Brussels. The Ministry added: "Georgia condemns all acts of terrorism and considers the terrorist attacks in Brussels represent the gravest crime against humanity and target world peace".

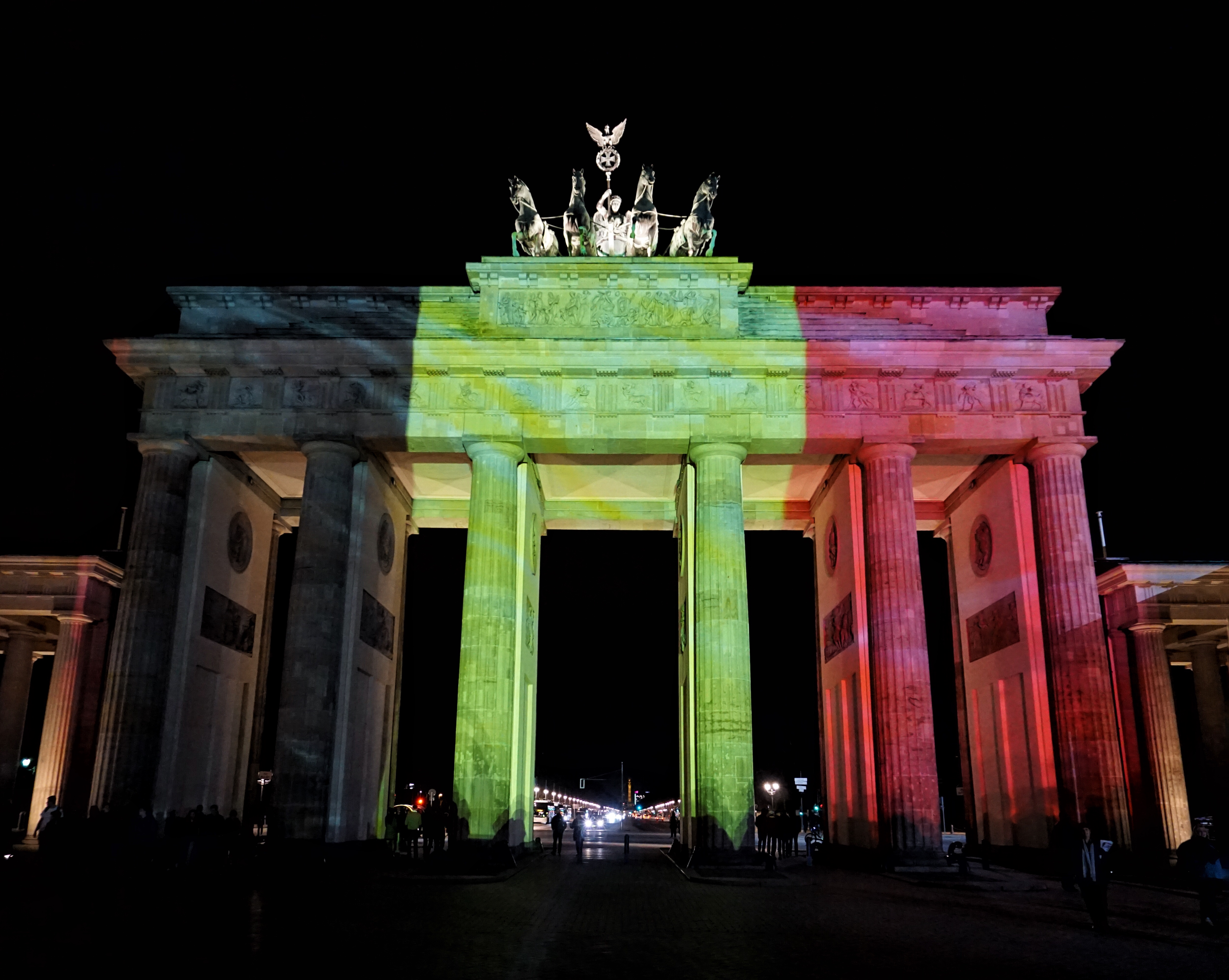
Brandenburg Gate lit in Belgian flag after the bombings.

- Germany: In a letter of condolences to King Philippe, President Joachim Gauck condemned the attacks as a "terrible crime" and announced that together with Belgium, Germany would "defend our joint values of liberty and democracy".
- Ghana: President John Dramani Mahama has condemned the terrorist bombings in Brussels. He said "Suicide bombing in Brussels. Another cowardly attack on innocent civilians. We stand in solidarity with Belgium. We would not be intimidated."
- Greece: Prime Minister Alexis Tsipras expressed solidarity, declaring that "Greece stands in solidarity with the citizens of Belgium and the EU. We can't allow fear, religious hatred and racism to prevail in Europe." The Greek Foreign Ministry decried the attack, and stated "Our Union’s capital is under attack. We mourn the dead and pledge to conquer terror through democracy."
- Guatemala: Guatemala "regrets the loss of life and expresses its dismay and solidarity to the people, government of Belgium and the European Union, especially to the families of the victims," Foreign Ministry said in a statement. Reiterating its strong condemnation of the attacks, he deplored "this kind of acts contrary to human rights, peaceful coexistence and respect for life."
- Holy See: Pope Francis "condemns once again the blind violence that breeds so much suffering, and implores the gift of peace from God."
- Honduras: Government expressed "its condolences to the people and Kingdom of Belgium". Also said "no doubt the world is shocked by this sad news at least 34 people killed and 200 wounded in the bombings in the city of Brussels, which has shaken all the great European family and that threaten the peace and welfare of the international community".
- Hungary: Prime Minister Viktor Orbán expressed his condolences saying, "he was shocked to hear of the attacks". He also ordered second-degree terror alert.
- Iceland: Foreign Minister Gunnar Bragi Sveinsson said that the people could be thankful that no Icelandic citizens were harmed.
- India: Prime Minister Narendra Modi expressed his condolences saying, "News from Brussels is disturbing. The attacks are condemnable. Condolences to families of the deceased. May those injured recover quickly".
- Indonesia: The Indonesian Ministry of Foreign Affairs issued a statement saying "The Indonesian government and people convey its deepest condolences to the people and government of Belgium, especially to the victims and their families." The statement also said Indonesia strongly condemns terrorism and violent activities for any reason, and called on the international community to increase partnership in tackling radicalism and terrorism.
- Iran: President Hassan Rouhani has "firmly condemned" terrorist bomb explosions in the Belgian capital city of Brussels: "Firmly condemn terrorist attacks in Brussels. Deepest condolences to the government and people of Belgium, especially those who lost loved ones", saying Rouhani in his Twitter account. Foreign Ministry spokesperson, Hossein Ansari also condemned the twin blasts in Brussels, stressing the importance of adopting all-embracing efforts to fight terrorism which is threatening the entire world.
- Iraq: President Fuad Masum said "Iraq strongly condemns such criminal act and expresses its deep solidarity with the friendly government and people of Belgium." He also called for "the strengthening of cooperation between different countries at all levels, in a way that could halt the growth of terrorism and eliminate their hotbeds and their means of support."
- Ireland: Prime Minister Enda Kenny said: "I understand from our ambassador in Brussels that, as far as we are aware, no Irish citizen has been involved here with the tragic circumstances, but we can't be certain yet as to the full impact of what has happened." President Michael D. Higgins offered his condolences on behalf of the Irish people to Belgium's King Philippe, saying: "These attacks strike at the fundamental right of all to live in peace. These actions must not undermine the will of all Europeans to live and work together." Prime Minister Kenny convened a meeting of the country's National Security Committee and the cabinet received a briefing. The country's parliament observed a minute's silence for the tragedies in Brussels and the Buncrana pier disaster which occurred two days earlier.
- Israel: Prime Minister Benjamin Netanyahu said "I want to send my condolences to the families of those murdered in today's terror attacks in Brussels. The chain of attacks from Paris to San Bernardino to Istanbul to the Ivory Coast and now to Brussels, and the daily attacks in Israel, this is one continuous assault on all of us." Yisrael Katz, Minister of Transport and Intelligence said: "If in Belgium they continue to eat chocolate, enjoy life and parade as great liberals and democrats while not taking account of the fact that some of the Muslims who are there are organising acts of terror, they will not be able to fight against them."
- Italy: Prime Minister Matteo Renzi said that his heart and his mind were in Brussels; while Foreign Minister Paolo Gentiloni stated "Holding my breath I am close to Belgians in the face of the shocking attack at the heart of Europe."
- Jamaica: Prime Minister Andrew Holness said "On behalf of the Government and people of Jamaica, I would like to express our deep sympathies to the people and to the Government of Belgium. We extend condolences to the families of those who have lost their lives and pray for a speedy recovery for those injured in this morning’s terror attack."
- Japan: Prime Minister Shinzō Abe expressed outrage and shock over the deaths in the bombings, saying "Terrorism can never be tolerated", adding that he voiced Japan's "strong solidarity with Belgium and the European Union, which face difficulties right now."
- Jordan: Foreign minister Nasser Gouda said "Jordan's position has always been to denounce terrorism, and we stand in solidarity with our friends in Belgium during this difficult time."
- Kazakhstan: President Nursultan Nazarbayev send telegram to King Philippe in which he expressed condolences on behalf of himself and the people of Kazakhstan to the bereaved families and wished speedy recovery to the injured. Nazarbayev condemns all kinds of terrorism and extremism that pose a threat to international security, and expresses its full support to the people of Belgium in a difficult moment for the country.
- Kenya: President Uhuru Kenyatta has condemned the terrorist attack in Brussels. He said the act was an attack on democracy, the open society and the values that Kenya holds dear. He called on nations to stand with Brussels and help fight the common cause to protect democracy and human liberty from its extremist enemies. "Kenya mourns with the people and government of Belgium following the heinous terrorist attacks today. We also stand in solidarity with the European Union, noting that its major institutions are hosted in Brussels."
- Kuwait: Foreign Ministry of Kuwait have condemned Brussels attacks. Kuwait support all measures taken by Belgium to protect its security and stability. Ministry also offered heartfelt condolences to the families and wished those injured swift recovery.
- Kyrgyzstan: President Almazbek Atambayev said that "The Kyrgyz Republic strongly condemns this inhuman and appalling act of terrorism and believes is unacceptable and unjustified acts of terrorism".
- Latvia: Foreign Minister Edgars Rinkēvičs said that "Latvia stands together with Brussels and Belgium in solidarity against terrorism".
- Liberia: President Ellen Johnson Sirleaf has condemned the terrorist attack in Brussels. She send message to King Phillipe of Belgium, expressed deep regret for the distressing events, said Liberia is saddened by the loss of lives resulting from these dastardly acts.
- Libya: All three Libyan governments have condemned Brussels attacks.
- Lithuania: President Dalia Grybauskaite and Prime Minister Algirdas Butkevicius expressed their solidarity with the victims, and condemned the attack. Prime Minister said: "I extend my deepest condolences to the families and relatives of the victims and all people of Belgium and other countries affected by this tragedy." "I wish unity in this difficult hour and health and fortitude to those injured."
- Luxembourg: Prime Minister Xavier Bettel said "On behalf of all of us, I have conveyed our shared pain for families and friends of victims and our Belgian neighbours...What we feared has happened... We are very united and deeply affected by what happened to our Belgian neighbours." Grand Duke Henri in open letter wrote "In these very dark times, we think with reverence of the victims of the attacks in Brussels and their families. Be assured of our unconditional solidarity in defending our common values."
- Macedonia: Prime Minister Emil Dimitriev said in telegram: "With disgust I received the news of the terrorist attacks in Brussels, which killed a number of people and where there are large number of wounded. In these difficult moments of sorrow of the friendly people of Belgium, let me express my condolences to the families of the victims of this barbaric and anti-civilization act, and to wish the injured a speedy recovery. Thoughts and prayers of the Macedonian citizens are with the citizens of Belgium."
- Malaysia: Prime Minister Najib Razak expressed Malaysia's solidarity with the people of Belgium and called for unity against the 'cowardly attacks'. The Malaysian government strongly condemning the attacks. While Deputy Prime Minister Ahmad Zahid Hamidi condemned the bombing, and stated "I and in behalf of all Malaysians feel extremely sad and shocked over what happened in Brussels. We stands in solidarity with the Belgians and supports any action that will be taken towards finding those who were responsible for the attacks".
- Malta: The Maltese government said that it was deeply shocked by the bombings and that it "condemns in the most categorical terms this despicable act and expresses its profound sorrow at the loss of lives and sympathy with the injured." Flags on government buildings were flown at half-mast on 24 February in solidarity with the victims of the attack.
- Mexico: Mexico's foreign relations secretary condemned the attacks rejecting "terrorism in all its forms and manifestations" while sending its "condolences and solidarity with the people and government of the Kingdom of Belgium, and with the families of the victims."
- Montenegro: Prime Minister Milo Đukanović said: "Following today’s terrorist attacks in Brussels, in which dozens of people were killed and injured, I express on behalf of the Government of Montenegro and in my own name our deepest condolences. We strongly condemn this deplorable act at the heart of Europe."
- Nepal: Ministry of Foreign Affairs said: "The Government of Nepal is shocked to learn of terrorist bomb attacks in different places of Brussels that resulted in massive loss of precious lives and injuries to many innocent people. ... Nepal condemns terrorism in all its forms and manifestations and holds the view that terrorism must be firmly and resolutely dealt with wherever and whenever it takes place."

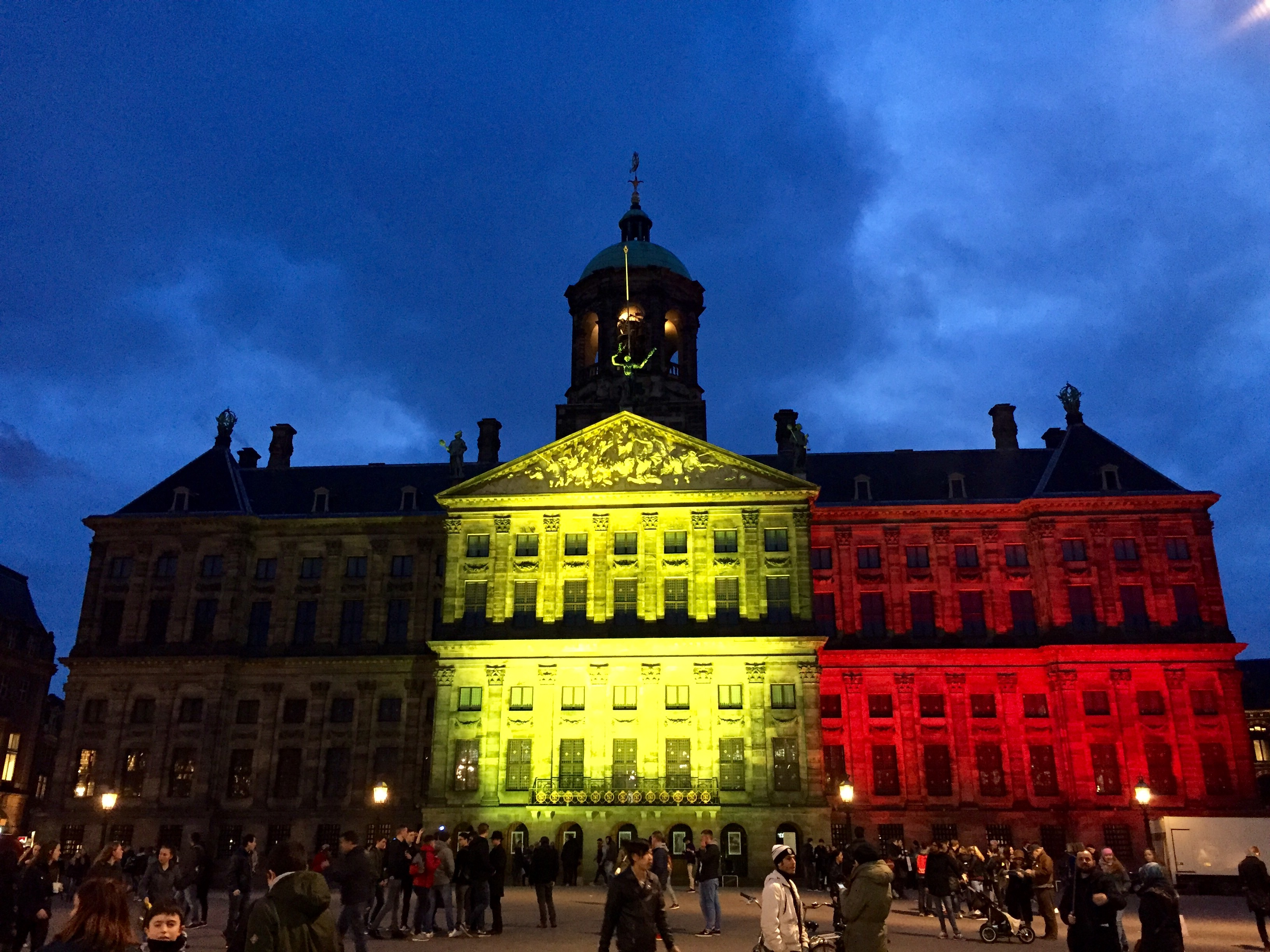
Royal Palace of Amsterdam lit in Belgian colours after the bombings

- Netherlands: Prime Minister Mark Rutte said "Belgium has "again been hit by cowardly and murderous attacks. Our hearts go out to the victims and next of kin. The Netherlands stands ready to help and support our southern neighbours in any possible way." In a letter of condolences to King Philippe, King Willem-Alexander condemned the violent attacks and said, "What is needed now is that we show our collective strength and uphold the values of freedom".
- New Zealand: Prime Minister John Key said: "We utterly condemn these appalling acts which have killed and wounded so many." "No innocent person should have to worry about such violence when going about their daily lives and New Zealand stands with Belgium in the fight against terrorism."
- Nicaragua: President Daniel Ortega said "we want to extend our deepest condolences and express our total condemnation of the terrorist attacks that lived Brussels this morning". Government said "denounces and condemns all terrorist acts that hurts us all and causes suffering, loss and confusion in our world."
- Nigeria: Special adviser of president Muhammadu Buhari, Femi Adesina, said "The President assures the global community that under his leadership, Nigeria will continue to work with other countries of the world to ensure that terrorism never triumphs over free, peaceful and law-abiding nations and people of the world." "He wishes the more than 100 persons injured in the attacks a speedy recovery."
- North Korea: President of the Presidium of the DPRK Supreme People's Assembly Kim Yong Nam said that North Korea "expressed deep condolences and sympathy to the king [of Belgium] and, through him, to the victims and bereaved families."
- Norway: Prime Minister Erna Solberg said that the terrorist attacks in Brussels are cruel. Norway condemns the attacks strongly, and that her thoughts are with the victims and their families. King Harald V said in a condolence to King Philippe of Belgium that "I have with great sadness received the news of the heinous attacks today in Brussels, which resulted in so many killed and injured. This tragedy in the heart of Europe reminds us once again of the importance of protecting our core democratic values. On behalf of myself and the Norwegian people, I send Your Majesty my deepest condolences. I ask you to pass on my condolences and deepest sympathy to the bereaved and to the Belgian people".
- Pakistan: The Foreign Office of Pakistan issued a statement saying "We are deeply saddened to learn about the bomb explosions in Brussels at Zaventem Airport and metro stations which caused loss of precious lives." The Pakistani Prime Minister, Nawaz Sharif and President, Mamnoon Hussain, condemned the attack and offered condolences. The local Embassy of Pakistan in Brussels cancelled its annual Pakistan Day celebrations and observed a minute of silence as a way to show solidarity with Belgium. The All Pakistan Ulema Council, a body of Pakistani religious clerics, also condemned the attack calling it 'heinous'.
- Palestine: President Mahmoud Abbas "offered his deepest condolences to the victims’ families and wished a speedy recovery to the injured ones" and stated that the "Palestinian people abhor terrorism and reject attacking civilians"
- Panama: The Government of the Republic of Panama solidarity with the people and Government of the Kingdom of Belgium after the terrorist attacks at the airport and Brussels, which left several casualties and injuries meter. As a country peacemaker, Panama condemns this and all acts of violence and calls to respect human rights and international security.
- Papua New Guinea: Prime Minister Peter O'Neill said: "The innocent loss of life and the injuries that were sustained, with some of the victims being children, is extremely distressing" and "On behalf of the people of Papua New Guinea, we extend our deep and sincere condolences to the families of the victims of this atrocity in Brussels."
- Paraguay: The Government of Paraguay, through the Ministry of Foreign Affairs, released a statement "expressing its heartfelt condolences and feelings of solidarity to the families of the victims and the people and Government of Belgium" in their denunciation of the terrorist attacks. Furthermore, the Paraguayan government "repudiated the criminal acts and reiterated its commitment to improving international intelligence communication for the prevention and eradication of terrorism."
- Peru: President Ollanta Humala expressed solidarity with Belgium, stating "We have gone through terrorist acts in the past, and we express our solidarity not only with Belgium, but with France and many other European countries in this situation." He also expressed his worries about intelligence services and migration in Europe: "The United States, NATO and the European Union have to review their policies of intervention in countries of the Middle East and North Africa region, because societies are being broken."
- Philippines: President Benigno Aquino III has directed the Transportation secretary Joseph Emilio Abaya to further tighten the security of airports in the country following the Belgium bombings. Aquino's spokesperson, Edwin Lacierda defined the attacks as "the very definition of cowardice, and have no place in any civilized society." and expressed solidarity with the Belgian people. The Philippine Embassy in Belgium expressed condolence to the victims of the bombings as well as to their families.

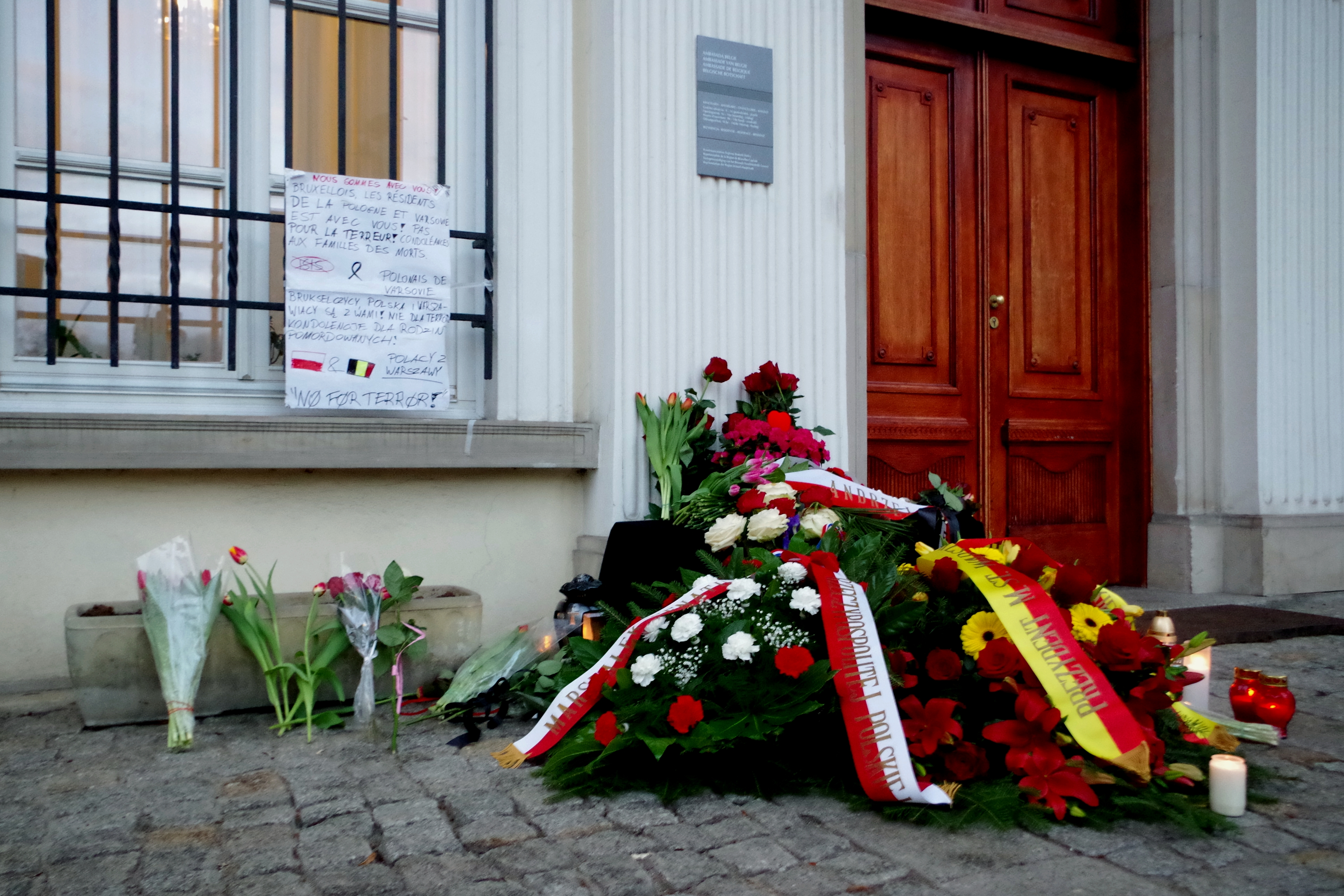
Flowers at the Belgian Embassy in Warsaw, Poland.

- Poland: Prime Minister Beata Szydło said "Our thoughts are there, in Brussels, and we are praying for the victims". Polish government convened emergency meeting after attacks. Poland declared that in view of the attacks it will not allow 7,000 refugee quota ordered by EU to be settled in Poland, "After what happened in Brussels yesterday, it's not possible right now to say that we're OK with accepting any number of migrants at all," Prime Minister Beata Szydlo stated.
- Portugal: President Marcelo Rebelo de Sousa called the attacks "a blind and cowardly attack on the heart of Europe" and said that "What unites us is the struggle for democracy, freedom and human rights. It is in these crucial moments of acute crisis that we feel the need to reaffirm these values". Prime Minister António Costa remarked that the fight against terrorism "requires in-depth work, an increasingly strong international cooperation, and also the promotion of intercultural dialogue".
- Qatar: Foreign ministry "strongly condemns the criminal bombing, which contradicts with all human values and principles, and aims to terrorise the unsuspecting innocents and destabilise international peace and security." Ministry "stressed Qatar's full solidarity with the friendly Kingdom of Belgium in the face of all forms of violence and terrorism whatever the motives and causes were".
- Romania: Prime Minister Dacian Cioloș said that he is shocked by the Brussels bombings and strongly condemns this attack. The day of 24 March was declared "Day of national Mourning". Also, the Building of Romanian Government was lighted up in Belgian flag colors in sign of solidarity with Brussels attacks victims.
- Russia: President Vladimir Putin condemned the attacks and said, "The fight against this evil calls for the most active international cooperation." Maria Zakharova, the speaker of the Foreign Ministry, said earlier on the same day that the attacks are the result of the policy of double standards which European Union has with regard to terrorism. And the chairman of the foreign affairs committee in Parliament Aleksey Pushkov noted, that "It is time for Europe to understand where the real threat is coming from, and to unite its efforts with Russia."
- Saint Lucia: Prime Minister Kenny Anthony has expressed his shock and sadness at Brussels attacks. He also issued a statement on behalf of the Government and people of Saint Lucia, standing in solidarity with the people of Belgium, and with the international community, and condemning the perpetrators of these attacks in the strongest possible terms.
- Saudi Arabia: King Salman strongly condemned the terror attacks and called for joint international efforts to confront and eliminate 'the scourge of terrorism' that rampantly happens now.
- Serbia: Prime Minister Aleksandar Vučić said that what happened in Brussels disasters and is horrified by these events, but believes Europe and the world will be able to find the best response to the terrorist attacks.
- Seychelles: President James Michel has sent a message of condolences to the Belgian Prime Minister Charles Michel. He said "We strongly condemn these cowardly acts of terror. ... We remain convinced that justice will prevail and the perpetrators will be apprehended and answer for the crimes."
- Singapore: Prime Minister Lee Hsien Loong expressed condolences and sympathies of Singaporeans to the families of the victims, and to the Belgian people. He noted over Facebook that Southeast Asia also faces a severe threat that is not a matter of if, but when, that an attack will take place here. "Indeed, today's attacks in Brussels happened even though the Belgians were on full alert."
- Somalia: Government strongly and unequivocally condemn the heinous and violent acts of terrorism in Brussels. "The fact that the terrorists would target innocent civilians in such a brutal and unforgivable manner is the greatest sign of their inhumanity and moral bankruptcy. Any violence against innocent civilians aimed at terrorizing them and their nation is deplorable and wholly evil."
- South Korea: Deputy Foreign Minister for Overseas Koreans Lee Key-cheol strongly condemn the attacks and urging South Koreans overseas to pay special attention to their safety, saying "no place in the world is free from the threat of terrorism". While Foreign Ministry spokesman Cho June-hyuck offered condolences and sympathy to all victims, their families and the Belgian government.
- Spain: Prime Minister Mariano Rajoy said that "terrorism will fail to defeat us. The unity of Democrats in Europe will always prevail over barbarism and madness".
- Sri Lanka: President Maithripala Sirisena sent a special message to King Philippe stating that he was shocked by the news of the attack, described as cowardly and barbaric. The President personally, and on behalf of the people of Sri Lanka, extended the condolences to the government and the people of Belgium and hoped for a speedy recovery to all victims affected in the explosions. "Such senseless brutal acts must be condemned by the entire world", he stated.
- Sweden: Prime Minister Stefan Löfven called the bombings "an attack against democratic Europe" and said that terrorism should never be accepted in open societies. The King Carl XVI Gustaf said that he with "dismay and horror" got the message.
- Switzerland: President Johann Schneider-Ammann said "Switzerland is deeply touched by the events today in Brussels. Our thoughts go out to the victims and their families." "Switzerland and Europe stood for freedom, safety, rule of law and democracy." "We will always uphold and defend these values."
- Syria: An official source strongly condemned the terrorist attacks. Bashar Jaafari said: "some of the terrorists who carried out the attack in Brussels yesterday, fought and killed the Syrians in Syria before they returned to Belgium."
- Tajikistan: President Emomali Rahmon send telegram to King Philippe in which asked the monarch to convey condolences to the relatives of people killed in the attacks, and wishes for a speedy recovery to the injured.
- Thailand: Prime Minister Prayut Chan-o-cha strongly condemned the attacks and offering condelences to Belgium. While Deputy Prime Minister Prawit Wongsuwan had instructed relevant agencies to be vigilant of any terrorism threat. The Thai Foreign Ministry issued a statement condemning "the cruelty of the attacks that claimed many lives and wounded many innocents", as well a condolences from the Tourism Authority of Thailand to the people of Belgium.
- Togo: President Faure Gnassingbé said in a message to King Philippe: "I want to you to express my indignation and my condemnation of these heinous attacks and to share the deep compassion and solidarity of the Togolese people."
- Tunisia: Tunisia condemned the attacks saying, "We strongly condemn the coward attacks that hit Brussels."
- Turkey: President Recep Tayyip Erdoğan said "I strongly condemn the heinous terrorist attacks that took place in Brussels today. The People of Turkey, who suffered from equally heinous attacks at the hands of terrorists, share the pain of the Belgian People." in his Twitter account. Prime Minister Ahmet Davutoğlu said "I curse the attack in Brussels, which has once again shown the global face of terror. I offer my condolences to the government and the people of Belgium and I want to express solidarity on behalf of our people." He added "I invite all of humanity to stand united against global terror and any sort of terrorism."
- Turkmenistan: President Gurbanguly Berdimuhamedow condemn terrorist acts and send words of sympathy to the victims. President's press service said: "Resolutely oppose any manifestation of terrorism and extremism, Turkmenistan fully supports the efforts of the international community in combating this evil and its eradication".
- Ukraine: President Petro Poroshenko said: "Shocked by deadly terrorist act in heart of united Europe. Condolences to Families of victims. We must stop terrorism together".
- United Arab Emirates: A statement released by Anwar bin Mohammed Gargash, Minister of State for Foreign Affairs, expressed condemnation of "these cowardly terrorist acts which targeted innocent civilians", reiterating the UAE's determined stance and rejection of all forms of violence and terrorism.

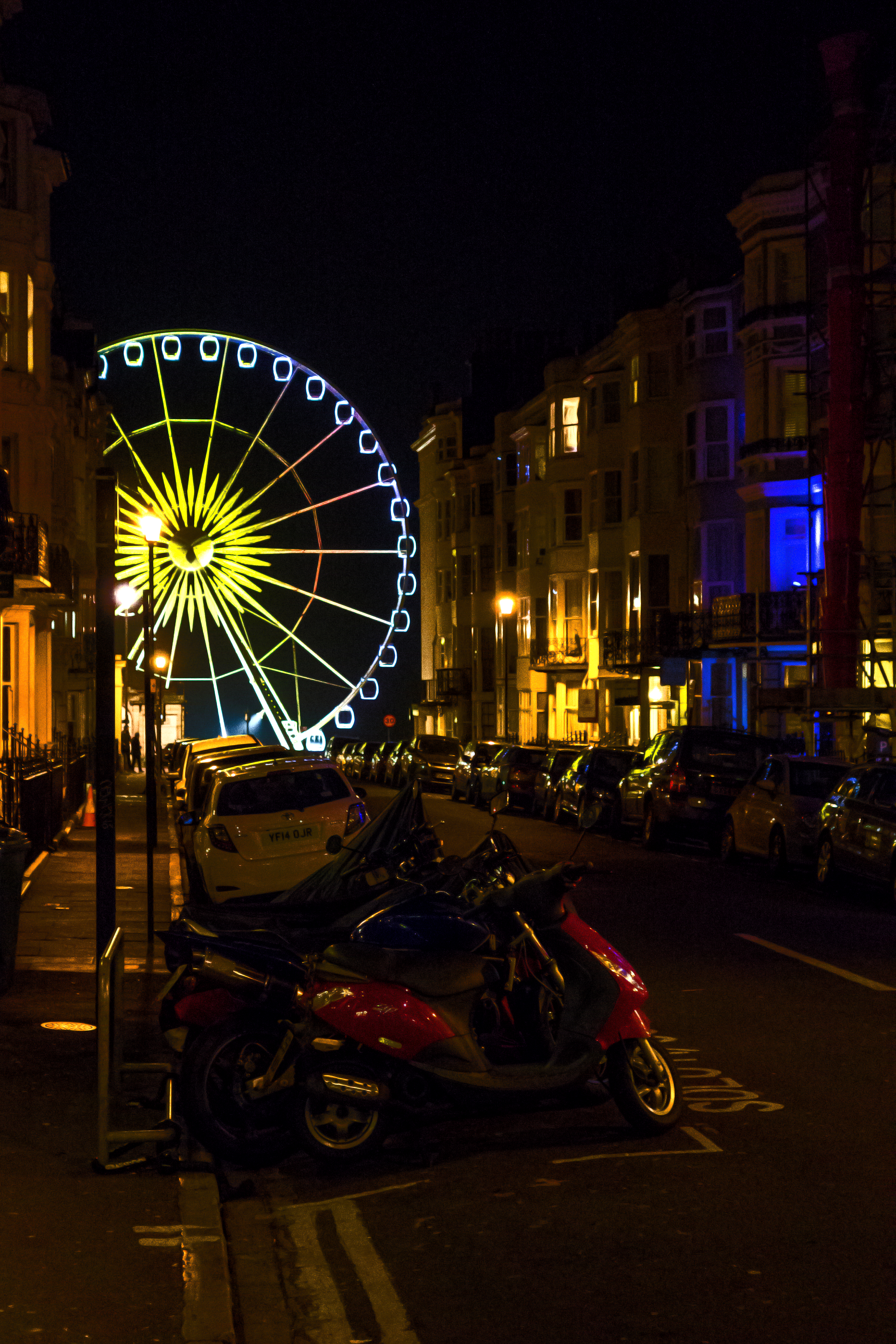
Brighton Wheel illuminated with Belgian colours to show solidarity

- United Kingdom: Prime Minister David Cameron said "I am shocked and concerned by the events in Brussels. We will do everything we can to help." Flags were flown at half-mast at government buildings, whilst the flag of Belgium was flown above 10 Downing Street
- United States: President Barack Obama stated in Havana, Cuba, that "the thoughts and prayers of the American people are with the people of Belgium and we stand in solidarity with them", adding "we will do whatever is necessary to help our friend and ally Belgium in bringing to justice those responsible." Obama also issued an Executive Order calling for American flags to be lowered to half-staff until Friday, 25 March 2016.
- Uruguay: Uruguayan Government issued a statement in which condemns "in the strongest terms" terrorist attacks in Brussels. Statement said also "In this regard Uruguay encourages the international community to remain united to combat this scourge that cuts off innocent lives and affects shared principles and values such as freedom, equality, respect for human rights and fundamental fraternity to hold peaceful coexistence between human beings. ... The government of Uruguay extends its heartfelt condolences and sympathy to the families of the victims and the government and people of the Kingdom of Belgium."
- Uzbekistan: President Islam Karimov send message to King Philippe in which conveyed deep sympathy to the families and friends of those killed and injured.
- Venezuela: President Nicolás Maduro "on behalf of the people and the Venezuelan government condemns the numerous terrorist attacks in the city of Brussels today strongly, and extends its condolences and solidarity to the families of the victims of this terrible and reprehensible act". In addition, the national government called on the international community to "urgently address the causes of this phenomenon, and to prevent access by terrorist groups and violent ends sources of funding, training and logistical endowment".
- Vietnam: President Trương Tấn Sang extended his condolences to King Philippe while Prime Minister Nguyễn Tấn Dũng sent condolences to his Belgian counterpart Charles Michel over the bombings. Spokesperson of the Vietnamese Ministry of Foreign Affairs Le Hai Binh has instructed its embassy in Belgium to check whether Vietnamese citizens are among victims, adding that "Vietnam is disgusted with such attacks".

=== Other ===
- Kosovo: Prime Minister Isa Mustafa said: "Expressing the sorrow of our citizens and the Kosovo government for the victims of these terrible acts of terrorism I express solidarity with the families of the victims and the government of Belgium."
- Taiwan: President Ma Ying-jeou denounced the terror attacks and extended condolences and sympathy to all victims and families involved.

=== ISIL ===
- ISIL: The Islamic State of Iraq and the Levant released a statement stating "Islamic State fighters opened fire inside Zaventem airport before several of them detonated their explosive belts,". A "martyrdom bomber detonated his explosive belt in the Maelbeek metro station,"

=== Political groups ===
- Hezbollah: In a statement Hezbollah condemned the attacks: "Europe is burning in the same fire it helped to inflame in Syria and the Middle East in collaboration with certain regional regimes".
- Hashd al-Shaabi condemned the terrorist attacks in Brussels, and said: "The ongoing terror attacks across the globe have their roots in ideologies that are being nurtured and supported by certain countries. These countries use it for their own political and economic agenda. The key in the fight against terrorism is to stand up to Saudi Arabia and curb its ideology of Wahhabism. It is also important to stand up to Turkey because of its support for ISIL."

== See also ==
- International reactions to the Charlie Hebdo shooting
- Reactions to the November 2015 Paris attacks
- Reactions to the 2017 Manchester Arena bombing
