= Dagres =

Dagres is a surname. Notable people with the surname include:

- Angelo Dagres (1934–2017), American professional baseball player
- Holly Dagres (born 1986), Iranian-American analyst and commentator
