= Symbols of Manchester =

The city of Manchester in North West England is represented by various symbols. Many of these symbols are derived from coat of arms granted to the Corporation of Manchester when the borough of Manchester was granted city status in 1842. Notably, the motif of the worker bee has been widely used to represent the city as a symbol of industry.

== Manchester City Council coat of arms ==
Coat of arms of Manchester City Council

A coat of arms was granted to the Corporation of Manchester in 1842 and continue to be used today by Manchester City Council. The blazon, or description of the arms, is as follows:

- Arms: Gules three Bendlets enhanced Or a Chief Argent thereon on Waves of the Sea a Ship under sail proper.
- Crest: On a Wreath of the Colours a Terrestrial Globe semée of Bees volant all proper.
- Supporters: On the dexter side a Heraldic White Hart Argent attired collared and chain reflexed over the back Or and on the sinister side a Lion guardant Or murally crowned Gules each charged on the shoulder with a rose of the last.
- Motto: Concilio et Labore

On the shield, the red field and gold stripes are derived from the coat of arms of the de Gresle family, were the first lords of the manor of Manchester. They also represent the rivers Irwell, Medlock and Irk, which flow through Manchester. The ship represents the city's trade, but pre-dates the opening of the Manchester Ship Canal by fifty years.

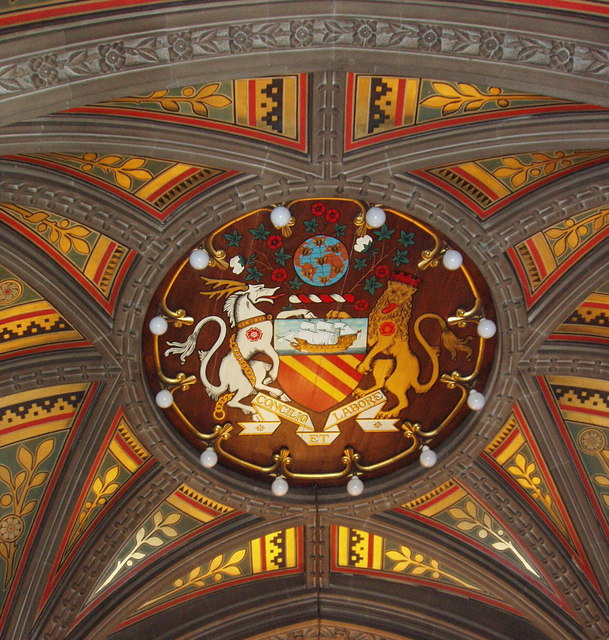
The coat of arms of Manchester City Council in Manchester Town Hall

On either side of the shield are a pair of supporters, an antelope and a lion, derived from the arms of King Henry IV, Duke of Lancaster, each bearing the red rose of Lancaster on its shoulder. Above the shield the crest consists of seven bees flying over a globe, symbolising Manchester's industry. Beneath the shield is the city's Latin motto, Concilio Et Labore, which is loosely translated to "by wisdom and effort" or "by counsel and labour", a phrase taken from the Book of Sirach 37:16: "Let reason go before every enterprise, and counsel before every action".

The coat of arms appears on many buildings around Manchester, including Manchester Town Hall and the Corn Exchange, and on blue plaques in the city. The gold bendlets on a red field are used in the arms of the Diocese of Manchester, and were used in the arms of the former University of Manchester Institute of Science and Technology, Victoria University of Manchester, and Great Central Railway to signify their link to the city. The ship is used in the arms of Manchester City Football Club (which also includes the bendlets) and Manchester United Football Club. The University of Manchester incorporates bees in its arms, and Manchester Metropolitan University uses antelope supporters and has a crest of a lion rampant holding a globe with bees.

== Worker bee ==
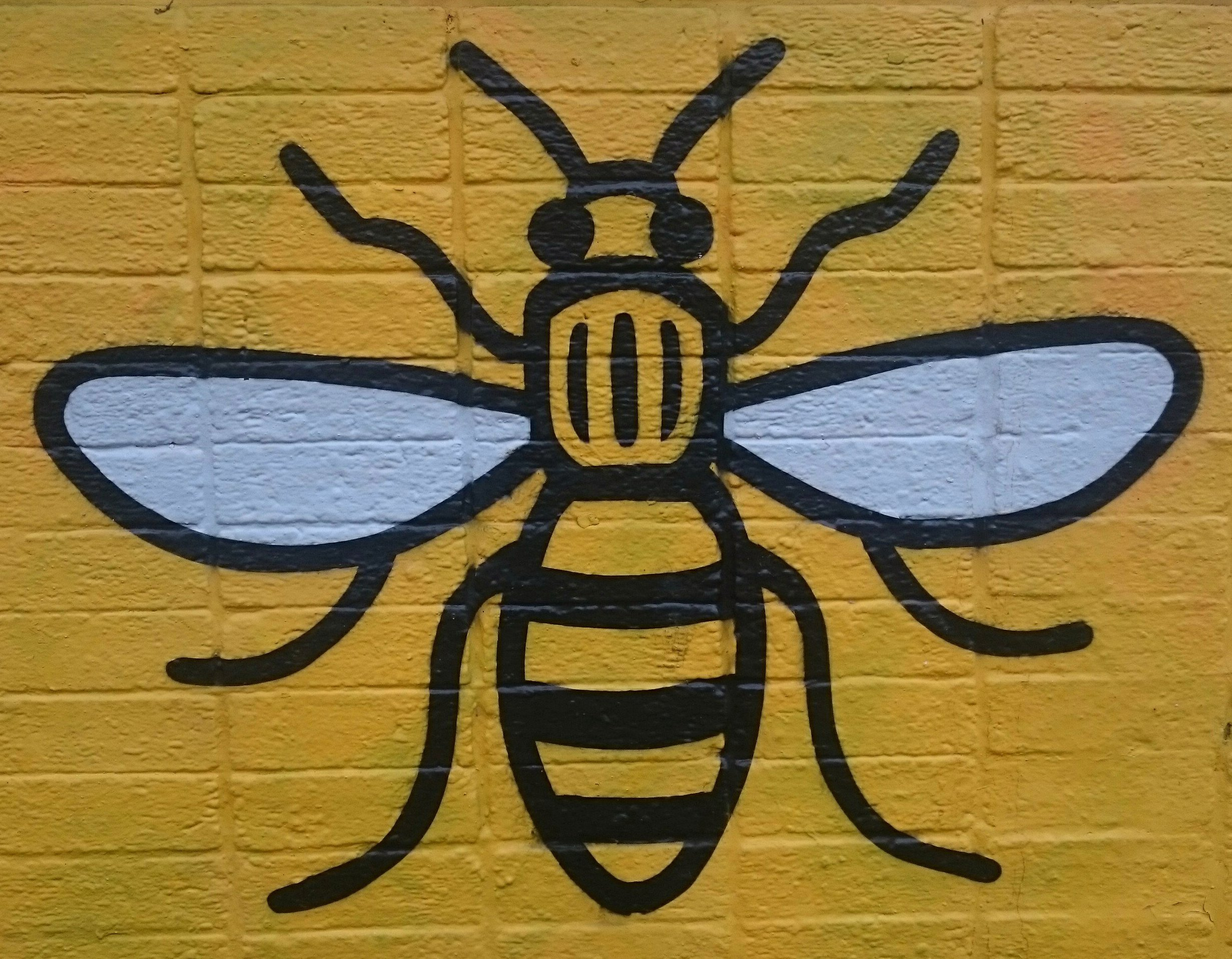
Manchester bee art in the Northern Quarter

The worker bee is one of the best-known symbols of Manchester. It was adopted as a motif for Manchester during the Industrial Revolution, at a time when Manchester was taking a leading role in new forms of mass production, and symbolises Mancunians' hard work during this era and Manchester being a hive of activity in the 19th century.

HMS Manchester was nicknamed Busy Bee after the Manchester bee symbol, and the bee is depicted on the ship's crest, which is also present on the ship's funnel. In the early 1970s the famous Boddingtons logo was introduced, depicting a barrel and two bees. The University of Manchester's coat of arms features three bees. The bees are depicted on many structures in Manchester such as lampposts and bollards. The 2009–10 away kit of Manchester City was inspired by the Manchester bee, featuring a black shirt with yellow shoulder inserts.

Following the May 2017 Manchester Arena bombing, the bee emblem gained popularity as a public symbol of unity against terrorism, appearing on protest banners and graffiti. Tattoo parlours both in and outside Manchester began to take part in the Manchester Tattoo Appeal, in which they offered bee tattoos to raise money for the victims of the attack.

A public art trail from 23 July to 23 September 2018, Bee in the City, featured 50 individually designed worker bee sculptures which were planted in the city whether inside or outside buildings and surrounding suburbs.

The brand of the re-regulated transport system operated by Transport for Greater Manchester is called the Bee Network, and the liveries of its trams, buses and bikes are yellow and black, representing the worker bee.

== Lancashire rose ==
The red rose of Lancaster.

Manchester is part of the historic county of Lancashire, within the Salford Hundred. This is reflected, as mentioned above, in the use of the red rose of Lancaster in the city council's coat of arms. After a reform of local government in 1974, Manchester became part of the new metropolitan county of Greater Manchester. The rose features in the badge of Manchester City Football Club.
