= International reactions to the Charlie Hebdo shooting =

This international reactions to the Charlie Hebdo Shooting contains issued statements in response to the 7 January 2015 Charlie Hebdo shooting. The response was largely one of condemnation.

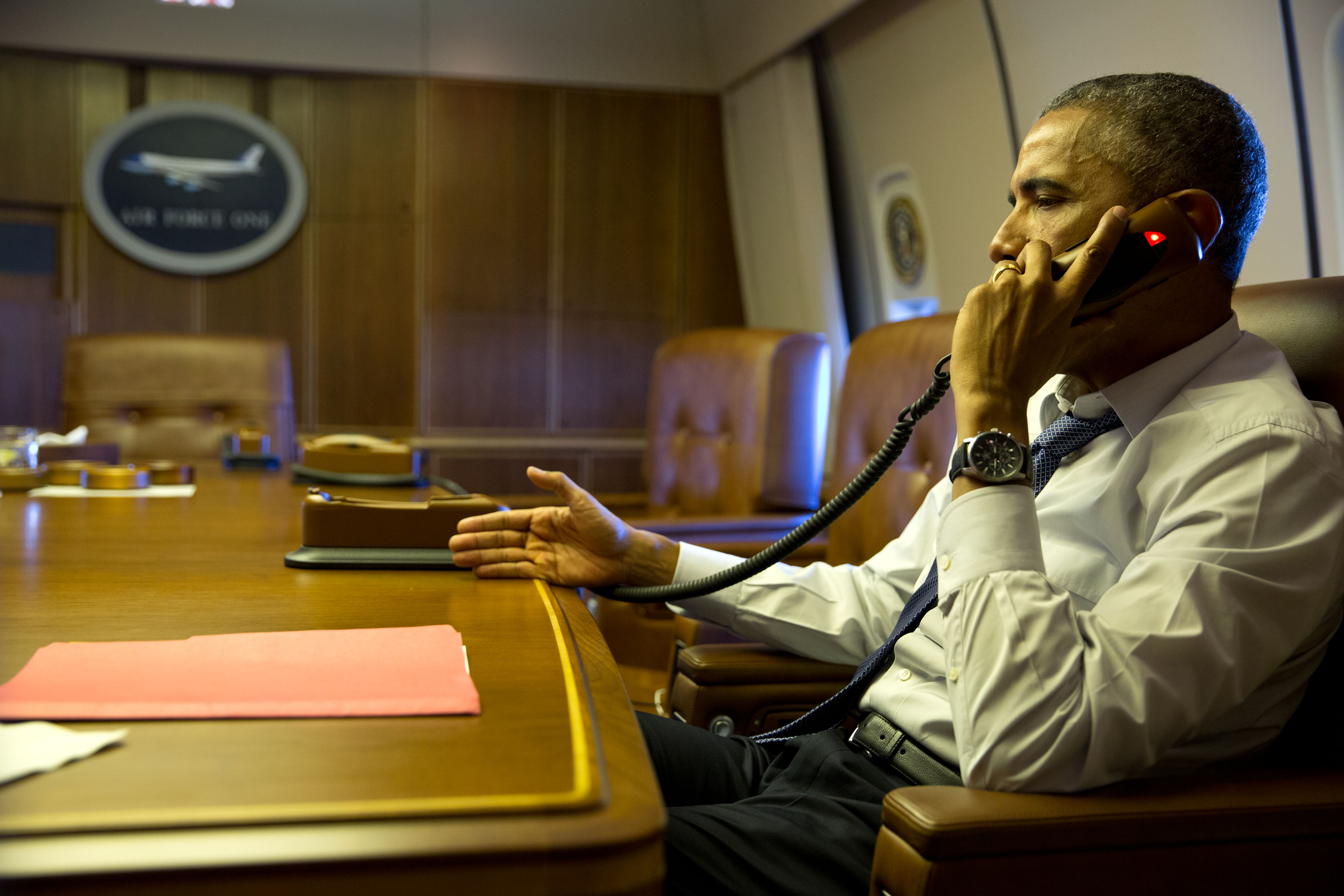
U.S. President Barack Obama talks on the phone with French President François Hollande from aboard Air Force One

== Countries ==
=== Africa ===
- Algeria – President Abdelaziz Bouteflika strongly condemned the attack in a letter of condolence to his French counterpart François Hollande. "At a time when France is going through this tragic ordeal, I would like to extend to you as well as to the families of the victims, on behalf of the Government and the people of Algeria and on my own behalf, our most heartfelt condolences as well as our strong condemnation of the barbaric act that nothing can justify," said the Head of State.
- Egypt – Foreign Minister Sameh Shoukry offered his condolences on behalf of Egypt, saying, "Egypt stands by France in confronting terrorism, an international phenomenon that targets the world's security and stability and which requires co-ordinated international efforts to eradicate." President Abdel Fattah el-Sisi later reiterated Shoukry's statement about the two countries' mutual fight against terrorism, condemning the "terrorist attack" and offering his condolences to Hollande and the families of the victims and the wounded.
- Mauritius – The Mauritian Government condemned the 'outrageous' terrorist attack on Charlie Hebdo magazine and against the values of freedom of expression. Prime Minister Sir Anerood Jugnauth has, on behalf of the Government of Mauritius and in his own name, sent a message of condolences to the French President, Mr François Hollande, and expressed his sympathy with the families of the victims, as well as his solidarity with the people of France.
- Morocco – In a message to President Hollande, King Mohammed VI sent his sincere condolences to families of the victims, and the whole French population, condemning the attack as a "heinous act".
- (Western Sahara) Sahrawi Republic – President Mohamed Abdelaziz expressed in a letter of condolence to his French counterpart deep sorrow over the attack which left many innocent victims, stressing the strong condemnation of the Sahrawi Republic to this terrorist act that panicked all freedom, justice and peace-loving peoples.
- South Africa – South African President Jacob Zuma said, "The South African Government joins the international community in condemning the calculated and barbaric terrorist attack on [Wednesday] against journalists and members of the public in Paris, France." He also added "Deliberate attacks against journalists and members of the public contravene international law and constitute a crime against humanity" and that "South Africa stands firmly with the international community by unequivocally condemning all terrorism and will continue to support regional and international efforts to address the scourge of terrorism in all its forms".
- Sudan – The deputy head of bilateral relations department at the foreign ministry, Ambassador Abdel Basit al Sanosi, paid his respects at the French Embassy, on behalf of the Sudanese government, where he signed a condolence book on Thursday. Al Sanosi transmitted his government's condolences to French Ambassador Bruno Aubert and said that Paris attack has nothing to do with Islam. The Sudanese diplomat said such terrorist attacks are the result of political tensions in the Middle East, and called for concerted international efforts to resolve these problems.

=== Asia ===
==== Central Asia ====
- Kazakhstan – Kazakh Nursultan Nazarbayev sent a telegram of condolence to the French President François Hollande. He wrote, "[The] spread of terrorism around the world now became a threat for all nations. As for its part, Kazakhstan condemns any and all forms of terrorism and extremism that pose a threat to the international security." Chairman of the Senate Kassym-Jomart Tokayev also said, "Journalists were killed in the terrorist attack in Paris. This crime can not [sic] be justified. The fight against terrorism is the task of the international community."

==== East Asia ====
- China – PRC Foreign Ministry spokesman Hong Lei said, "We are deeply shocked at the terrorist attack and strongly condemn it. The Chinese side firmly opposes all forms of terrorism and supports the efforts made by the French side to safeguard domestic security." President Xi Jinping on Thursday sent a message of condolences to his French counterpart, François Hollande, over Wednesday's terrorist attack in Paris and strongly condemned the onslaught. In the message, Xi expressed deep grief for the loss of lives and extended sincere condolences to the injured and the families of the killed. "Terrorism is a common enemy of all mankind and a common threat to the entire international community, including both China and France. China is firmly opposed to all forms of terrorism, and stands ready to work with France and other countries to boost security and counter-terrorism cooperation so as to safeguard world peace and protect the people of all countries in the world."
- Japan – In a condolence message delivered to French President François Hollande the day following the shootings, Japanese Prime Minister Shinzo Abe condemned the attack and underlined the importance of Japan's solidarity with France.

==== South Asia ====
- Pakistan – The Ministry of Foreign Affairs released a statement condemning the attack and said, "Pakistan deplores terrorism in all its forms and manifestations. We extend our condolences to the government and people of France on the loss of life. We are confident that the international community will continue to stand firm against terrorism and bring the perpetrators of terrorist acts to justice." Pakistani President Mamnoon Hussain also sent a letter of condolences to President Hollande.
- India – Indian Presisent Pranab Mukherjee condemned the terrorist attack and said, "Terror and violence have no place in any corner of the world. The world community must unite to root out terror from every country and society." Indian Prime Minister Narendra Modi offered further condolences, saying, "Our solidarity with [the] people of France. My thoughts are with [the] families of those who lost their lives."
- Sri Lanka – Sri Lankan President Mahinda Rajapaksa condemned the terrorist attack and offered his condolences to the families of the victims and said, "The world needs to come together to fight all forms of terrorism wherever it happens."

==== Southeast Asia ====
- Cambodia – Cambodian Prime Minister Hun Sen sent a letter to French Prime Minister Manuel Valls on 8 January where he stated that "Cambodia strongly condemns this kind of heinous act. This brutal act of extreme gravity is an attack against democracy and press freedom".
- Indonesia – The Indonesian Ulema Council (MUI) has expressed fear that Wednesday's deadly shooting attack on the office of the French magazine, Charlie Hebdo, will harm Muslims around the world and hope the international community will be fair with this incident and not generalize it as part of Islam. Saleh Partaonan Daulay, chairman of the House of Representatives Commission-VIII, noted the shooting attack is worth condemning because the action deviates far from the teachings and values of Islam, and described the attack as criminal and as contrary to the values of humanity and defaming the name of Islam
- Malaysia – In a statement issued by Foreign Ministry, the Government of Malaysia condemned the attack, saying, "Nothing justifies taking innocent lives. Malaysia is united with the families of the victims, the government of France, and the French people." Malaysian Prime Minister Najib Razak condemned in the strongest terms all acts of violence and voiced his determination to fight extremism with moderation.
- Philippines – The Department of Foreign Affairs released a statement condemning the shooting, saying, "We are appalled by the senseless attacks that took twelve innocent lives and wounded several others in Paris." The agency also said that the Philippines is with France and the rest of the world in denouncing the shooting, which it describes as "blatant disregard for human lives and the fundamental right of expression." The agency also states that it sympathizes with the families of the victims.
- Singapore – Singaporean President Tony Tan wrote to French President François Hollande expressing his condolences and sympathies to victims and families. "As France mourns the victims, may the perpetrators be brought to justice swiftly, and may the wounded have a speedy recovery," he wrote. Singaporean Prime Minister Lee Hsien Loong on Thursday "strongly condemned" the terrorist attack. He wrote, "It is yet another reminder of the threat posed by terrorism to all civilised societies, and that it is totally wrong to invoke religion to justify such savagery." In addition, Singapore had conducted an emergency exercise "Exercise Heartbeat" to simulate these shootings, which is located at some of the Frasers Centrepoint malls on 27 January 2015.
- Vietnam – Chairman Truong Tan Sang and Prime Minister Nguyen Tan Dung sent messages of condolences to their French counterparts François Hollande and Manuel Valls, respectively. Meanwhile, at the Foreign Ministry's regular press conference in Hanoi on 8 January, Deputy Spokesperson Pham Thu Hang said the attack is "brutal and unacceptable". She also added that "Vietnam condemns terror activities in any form" and "Vietnam believes the instigators will soon be severely punished".

==== West Asia ====
- Afghanistan – President Ashraf Ghani condemned the attack and offered condolences to the President of France, the families of the victims and the people of France, stating that the "killing of defenseless people and civilians is a heinous act of terrorism, and there is no justification for this brutal act."
- Armenia – President Serzh Sargsyan sent a letter of condolence to his counterpart François Hollande condemning the attacks and stating that "Armenia and the Armenian people stand beside the friendly people of France."
- Azerbaijan – The president Ilham Aliyev sent his condolences to François Hollande, the President of the French Republic emphasizing extreme anger by this horrific event, and strongly supported the resolute struggle against all manifestations of terrorism. Ministry of Foreign affairs also issued a similar statement.
- Georgia – President Giorgi Margvelashvili, Prime Minister Irakli Garibashvili, Foreign Ministry, and the main opposition United National Movement party released separate statements, condemning the attack and referring to it as an "horrible" and "barbaric act of terrorism". Prime Minister Garibashvili headed to Paris to take part in the "unity rally".
- Iran – The Iranian spokeswoman of the Foreign Ministry Marzieh Afkham condemned the attack and said that "any terrorist action against innocent humans is against the teachings of Islam". But Afkham also said that "making use of freedom of expression... to humiliate the monotheistic religions and their values and symbols is unacceptable." Prompted by the shooting by militants who said that they had acted in the name of Islam, and writing about the current image of Islam in the West, Iran's Supreme Leader Ayatollah Ali Khamenei released the letter on his official website. It was also promoted via a Twitter account attributed to him. In that open letter titled "To the Youth in Europe and North America", Khamenei urged young people in Europe and North America not to judge Islam by the attacks, but to seek their own understanding of the religion. Holly Dagres of Al-Monitor wrote that Khamenei's followers "actively spammed Facebook, Instagram, Twitter, Google+ and even Tumblr with links" to the letter with the aim of garnering the attention of people in the West.
- Israel – President Reuven Rivlin said: "We stand with France in its determination to safeguard freedom of speech and the freedom of the press, that are central pillars of any democracy." Prime Minister Benjamin Netanyahu condemned the attack as a "brutal act of savagery" and sent condolences to the French people. He stressed that the free world must unite against Islamic terrorism. Foreign Affairs Minister Avigdor Lieberman also sent condolences to the victims' families, and said, "Israel sympathizes with France's pain. The world must not allow terrorists to intimidate the free world and the West is obligated to stand united and determined against this threat."
- Jordan – State Minister for Media Affairs and Communications Mohammad Momani said the attack on the headquarters of the French newspaper, is an aggression against France and the noble principles and values. Momani offered condolences on behalf of the Jordanian government to the French government and people and reiterated Jordan's solidarity with all friendly countries in countering all forms of terrorism.
- Lebanon – Prime Minister Tammam Salam sent a fax to France President Farnçois Hollande slamming the "unacceptable and unjustifiable terrorist act" and also expressing his "sympathy with the families of the victims during this painful circumstance".
- Palestinian Authority – Palestinian President Mahmoud Abbas denounced the attack as terrorism in a message to French President François Hollande, and said such "heinous crimes" are condemned by morality and religion.
- Saudi Arabia – The Saudi government condemned the attacks, referring to them as a "cowardly terrorist attack that was rejected by the true Islamic religion".
- Syria – The Syrian Ministry of Foreign Affairs and Expatriates condemned the attack, saying it showed that serious policies are need to "eliminate the epidemic of terrorism". The source said it had previously warned European nations against supporting terrorist groups in Syria, saying that the plan would backfire. It added that the attack "confirms deficiency of the European policies and its responsibility for the bloodshed in Syria."
- United Arab Emirates – The Ministry of Foreign Affairs strongly condemned the heinous terrorist attack at the office of the French weekly Charlie Hebdo in Paris, in which scores of unarmed innocent civilians were killed and injured. In a statement, emphasised the UAE's solidarity with the friendly government and people of France at this critical time and expressed its condemnation of terrorism in all its forms and manifestations as a phenomenon that targets international security and stability.

=== Europe ===
==== Eastern Europe ====
- Albania – Prime Minister Edi Rama sent a letter of condolence to his counterpart Manuel Valls stating that the Albanian nation empathises with the French people and describing the attack as "a wound opened barbarically to terrorise France, Europe, the free nations of the democratic world and to impose us the abandonment of the values of this world that France embodies solemnly."
- Belarus – President Alexander Lukashenko offered his condolences to the President of France, and condemned "any forms and manifestations of terrorism and extremism".
- Bosnia and Herzegovina – Presidency of Bosnia and Herzegovina issue a statement where is said that they believe that it is not only an attack on the editorial staff of the Charlie Hebdo or only to France, but to the entire free and democratic world as well as an attack on freedom of expression.
- Bulgaria – Prime Minister Boyko Borisov strongly condemned the attack and further added "This bloody terrorist act causes anger against those committing murders and attacking the freedom of speech. We express solidarity with the French people in this difficult time and share the grief of the families and relatives of the dead. There is no cause that justifies terror."
- Croatia – President Ivo Josipović and Prime Minister Zoran Milanović condemned the shooting.
- Czech Republic – Prime Minister Bohuslav Sobotka called the shooting an act of terrorism aimed at freedom of speech, which is essential for sustaining democracy.
- Hungary – Both President János Áder and Prime Minister Viktor Orbán have condemned the attack and sent their condolences to the families of the victims and to the French people. Orbán said "nothing can justify this ruthless attack and inhuman violence".
- Kosovo – Prime Minister Isa Mustafa expressed his shock regarding the terrorist attack. He stated that the "Government of the Republic of Kosovo strongly condemns this barbaric and cowardly act against the French citizens, police and journalists. In these difficult moments, we express our most sincere condolences, and assure that the people of Kosovo stand along the French people in the fight against terror, and in the defence of the values of freedom."
- Lithuania – President Dalia Grybauskaitė extended condolences to President of France François Hollande over the attack and called it "brutal and unjustifiable act".
- Poland – Prime Minister Ewa Kopacz stated that the attack was aimed at Europe's most basic values such as democracy and freedom of speech. She also expressed condolences to the families and relatives of the victims.
- Romania – President Klaus Iohannis and Prime Minister Victor Ponta both condemned the attack strongly and sent their condolences to the French people. Iohannis also reiterated Romania's "full commitment to fighting terrorism and extremism of any kind." Iohannis, Ponta and the head of the Romanian Intelligence Service (SRI) met to discuss about the attack and its implications for Romania's security.
- Russia – President Vladimir Putin said, "We decisively condemn this cynical crime. We reaffirm our readiness to continue active co-operation in combating the threat of terrorism." Meanwhile Russia's media watchdog Roskomnadzor warned publications that printing cartoons of the Prophet Mohammed was against Russia's law and ethical norms. Pro-Kremlin commentators accused the cartoonists of provoking the attack. Russia's Russian Council of Muftis said that "perhaps the sin of provocation... is no less dangerous for peace than the sin of those who yield to the provocation". Chechnya's head, Ramzan Kadyrov said those who drew Mohammed cartoons were "people without spiritual and moral values".
- Serbia – Prime Minister Aleksandar Vučić offered the deepest condolences, saying, "We are terrified by this event, but we are confident that France and the great French civilisation, known for its tolerance, will know how to deal with the threat that terrorism carries. The Republic of Serbia will, with all its capacities, help the fight against terrorism, the world's greatest scourge. The French Republic can always count on friendly and sincere support of the Republic of Serbia."
- Slovenia – Prime Minister Miro Cerar condemned the attacks, and expressed solidarity with France, the press, victims and their relatives.
- Ukraine – President Petro Poroshenko called the attacks "unacceptable" and offered his condolences to the victims and to the people of France. Poroshenko reiterated that Ukraine has zero tolerance for terrorism and that Ukraine will stand in solidarity with France and with the world against terrorism.

==== Northern Europe ====
- Denmark – Danish Prime Minister Helle Thorning-Schmidt noted, "Completely defenceless and innocent people became the victims of what appears to be an attack on free speech. The French society, like ours, is open, democratic and based on a free and critical press. Those are values that are deeply rooted in all of us, and which we shall protect. It is also those very values that make France a strong society that can withstand an attack like this."
- Finland – Both Finnish President Sauli Niinistö and Finnish Prime Minister Alexander Stubb have condemned the attack.
- Iceland – Icelandic Prime Minister Sigmundur Davíð Gunnlaugsson strongly condemned the attack, calling it a "horrific act" and stating that "our thoughts remain with the victims and their families".
- Sweden – Swedish Prime Minister Stefan Löfven condemned the attack, calling it "a disgusting attack against the democratic foundations" and "an attack that emphasises our responsibility to always stand up for the freedom of the press and freedom of expression".

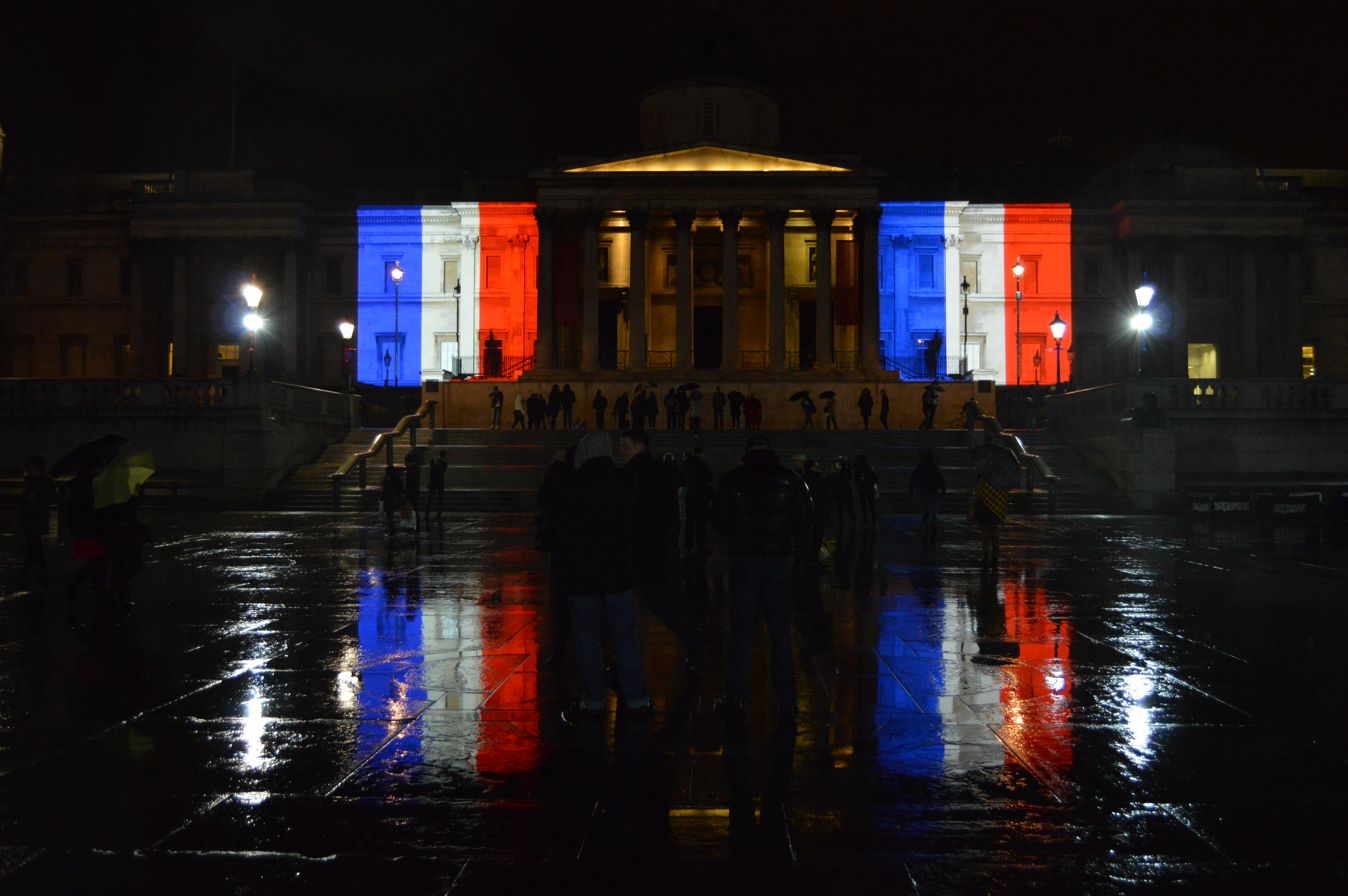
French flag was projected on the National Gallery, United Kingdom

==== Southern Europe ====
- Greece – Greek Prime Minister Antonis Samaras expressed "on behalf of the Greek people, our deep sadness and our revulsion for the terrorist attack" and commented further that "We Greeks stand in solidarity with the relatives of the innocent victims and we partake in the mourning of the French people".
- Italy – Italian Prime Minister Matteo Renzi expressed a feeling of horror and dismay regarding the attack. He offered his best wishes to the people of France and noted his close relationships with President François Hollande and Paris Mayor Anne Hidalgo. "Violence will always lose against freedom and democracy," he added. He was later invited to the French embassy, where he declared, "We are all French, because we think freedom is the only raison d'être of Europe and European citizens." The Italian Foreign Affairs Minister Paolo Gentiloni described the shooting as "an infamous attack" and also added, "Italy stands with the families of the victims and to the French people and government in the fight against terrorism."
- Portugal – The Ministry of Foreign Affairs offered their sincerest condolences, saying, "We strongly condemn the violent attack that took place today in Paris and we deeply lament the loss of life. We are closely monitoring the situation from the Embassy of Portugal in Paris. Our consulate general will be in constant contact with the French authorities."
- Spain – Spanish Prime Minister Mariano Rajoy condemned the attack, which was described as barbaric, sent his condolences and solidarity to the victims' families and the French people. He said, "They will not be able to destroy the most sacred that we human beings have, that is, our rights and our freedoms. France has the solidarity and affection of the Spanish people, and the cooperation of our government in the fight against terrorism."
- Turkey – Turkish Prime Minister Ahmet Davutoğlu sent his condolences to the people of France and added, "We condemn terrorism in the strongest manner. We stand with the people of France. Terrorism has no religion, nationality or a value it represents. Terrorism is a crime against humanity and can in no way be justified." Turkish Deputy Prime Minister Yalçın Akdoğan also made a statement condemning the shooting. However, Turkey launched a criminal investigation against one of its largest daily newspapers, Cumhuriyet, for "insulting religious values", in its coverage of the controversial cartoons published in France. Amnesty International said it amounted to state censorship. Turkey's Prime Minister called the reproduction of the cartoons a "grave provocation", and that "the freedom of expression does not mean the freedom to insult".
- Vatican City – Vatican press director Father Federico Lombardi stated, "The Holy Father expresses his firmest condemnation of the horrible attack. Whatever its motivation might be, homicidal violence is abominable and is never justified." Pope Francis also added that attacks undermine "the fundamental good of peaceful coexistence of people despite national, religious and cultural differences". One week after the massacre, Pope Francis stated that there were limits to free speech and said "If [a close friend] says a swear word against my mother, he's going to get a punch in the nose," he explained. "One cannot provoke, one cannot insult other people's faith, one cannot make fun of faith."

==== Western Europe ====
- Belgium – Minister of Foreign Affairs Didier Reynders was shocked and disgusted by the attack, calling it "[a] barbarous attack at the heart of Europe." He expressed his sincere condolences to the families and friends of the victims and to the people of France. He further regarded the terrorist act as "[a]n attack against freedom of expression, a precious fundamental freedom which we must continue to defend." A national security assessment within Belgium was also ordered by Belgian Prime Minister Charles Michel in response to the attack.

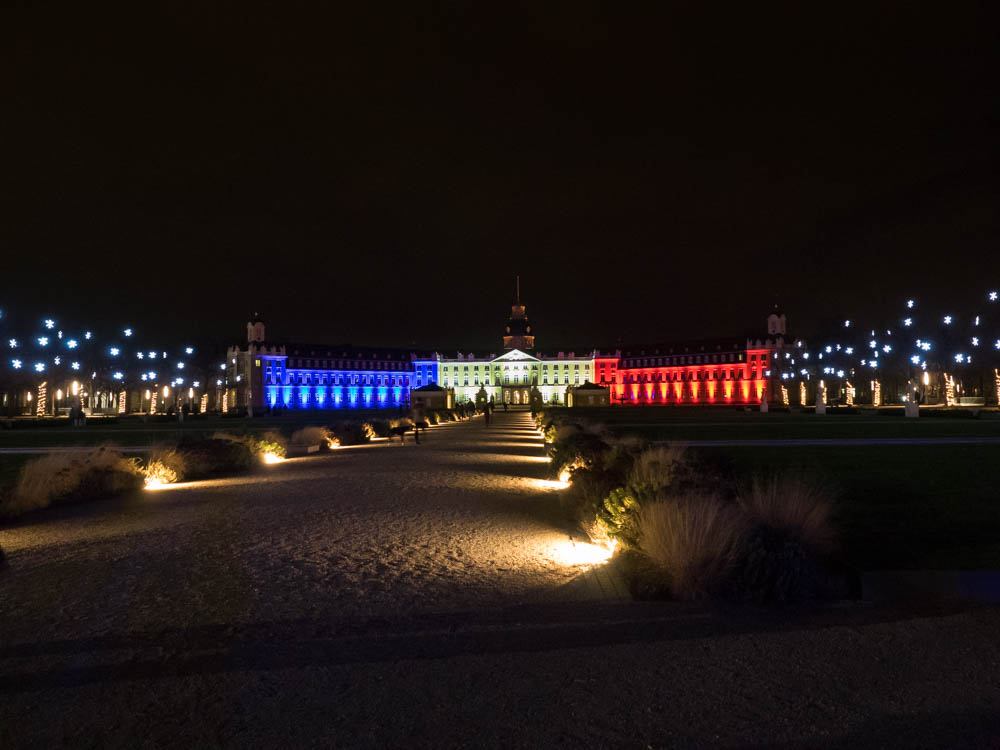
The Karlsruhe Palace illuminated in French tricolor

- Germany – German Chancellor Angela Merkel called the attack an abhorrent act, and added that it was "[n]ot just an attack on the life of French citizens and the internal security of France. It also represents an attack on freedom of opinion and of the press, (an attack on) a core element of our free and democratic culture, [an attack] for which there can be no justification."
- Luxembourg – Speaking to the press, Luxembourguish Prime Minister Xavier Bettel said, "I have no words to describe this terrible deed." He condemned the attacks as an act of "unspeakable barbarity" and further stated, "We have rights, duties and freedoms for which we fought. Therefore, it cannot be that we give this up just because a handful of people do not share these values."
- Monaco – Albert II, Prince of Monaco said, "On my own behalf and on behalf of my family and the people of Monaco, I want to express our dismay at such barbarity."
- Netherlands – Willem-Alexander, King of The Netherlands said he was "deeply shocked" and expressed his support for "the defence of democratic values which are the basis of our societies." He later added that it was "a direct attack on our freedom which affects us all." Dutch Prime Minister Mark Rutte was stunned by the attack: "This heinous and cowardly act of terrorism affects us all. Netherlands stands shoulder to shoulder with France."
- Ireland – Taoiseach Enda Kenny condemned the "brutal and horrific killings" and expressed solidarity with the victims and their families. He described the incident as "a direct attack on the basic values of freedom of speech and of tolerance."
- Switzerland – The Swiss Government condemned the attack and offered its sincere condolences to the families of the victims on behalf of the Swiss people.
- United Kingdom – British Prime Minister David Cameron told the House of Commons, "This House and this country stand united with the French people in our opposition to all forms of terrorism and we stand squarely for free speech and democracy. These people will never be able to take us off those values." British Deputy Prime Minister Nick Clegg said, "There can be no excuse, no reason, no explanation. They have killed cartoonists who have done nothing more than draw drawings which they happened to find offensive. At the end of the day, in a free society people have to be free to offend each other. You cannot have freedom unless people are free to offend." Elizabeth II, Queen of the United Kingdom also sent "sincere condolences".

=== North America ===
==== Caribbean ====
- Antigua and Barbuda – Elizabeth II, Queen of the Antigua and Barbuda sent "sincere condolences". Antiguan and Barbudan Prime Minister Gaston Browne also sent a letter of condolence to French President Hollande, condemning "the senseless killings and express my condolences to the families of the victims and the government and people of France." He further expressed his confidence that "the people of France who are known for their pride, strength and humility, will remain steadfast during this time of mourning and healing."
- Costa Rica – President Luis Guillermo Solís repudiated the "barbarianism" implicit in the attack against the weekly satirical Charlie Hebdo.
- Cuba – Chairman Raúl Castro expressed his condolences. René González and Ramón Labañino of the Cuban Five also condemned the terrorist attack.
- Saint Lucia – Elizabeth II, Queen of Saint Lucia sent "sincere condolences". St Lucian Prime Minister Dr. Kenny Anthony called on France's Ambassador to Saint Lucia and the Organisation of Eastern Caribbean States, Eric de La Moussaye, to express his sympathy and - through the ambassador - to extend his condolences to the Government and people of France, praising them for their response to the tragedy.

==== Central America ====
- El Salvador – The government of El Salvador condemned "in the strongest terms the attack of today in Paris," expressed the Ministry of Exterior Relations.
- Guatemala – The Government of Guatemala condemned "energetically" the terrorist attack to the weekly satyrical Charlie Hebdo, expressed the Ministry of Exterior Relations.
- Honduras – The Government of Honduras, through the Secretary of External Relations, issued a statement condemning the attack.
- Mexico – Mexico's Secretariat of Foreign Affairs, under José Antonio Meade Kuribreña, condemned the attack and stated that Mexico rejects all forms and manifestations of terrorism. It offered its condolences to the French government and its citizens, as well as to the victims' families. President Enrique Peña Nieto also offered his condolences through Twitter. At the Embassy of France in Polanco, Mexico City, several French citizens gathered to carry out a vigil. Those present wrote messages on a book in memory of the victims. French ambassador Maryse Bossière gave a speech to those present.
- Nicaragua – President of Nicaragua Daniel Ortega condemned and expressed his condolences to the government and people of France for the "terrible attack" to the satirical magazine Charlie Hebdo.
- Panama – The government of the Republic expressed its sincere condolences to the people and the government of the French Republic for the attack in central Paris.

==== Northern America ====
- Canada – Elizabeth II, Queen of Canada sent "sincere condolences". Prime Minister Stephen Harper also described the attack as an act of barbaric violence and further added that "Canada and its allies will not be intimidated and will continue to stand firmly together against terrorists who would threaten the peace, freedom and democracy our countries so dearly value. Canadians stand with France on this dark day."

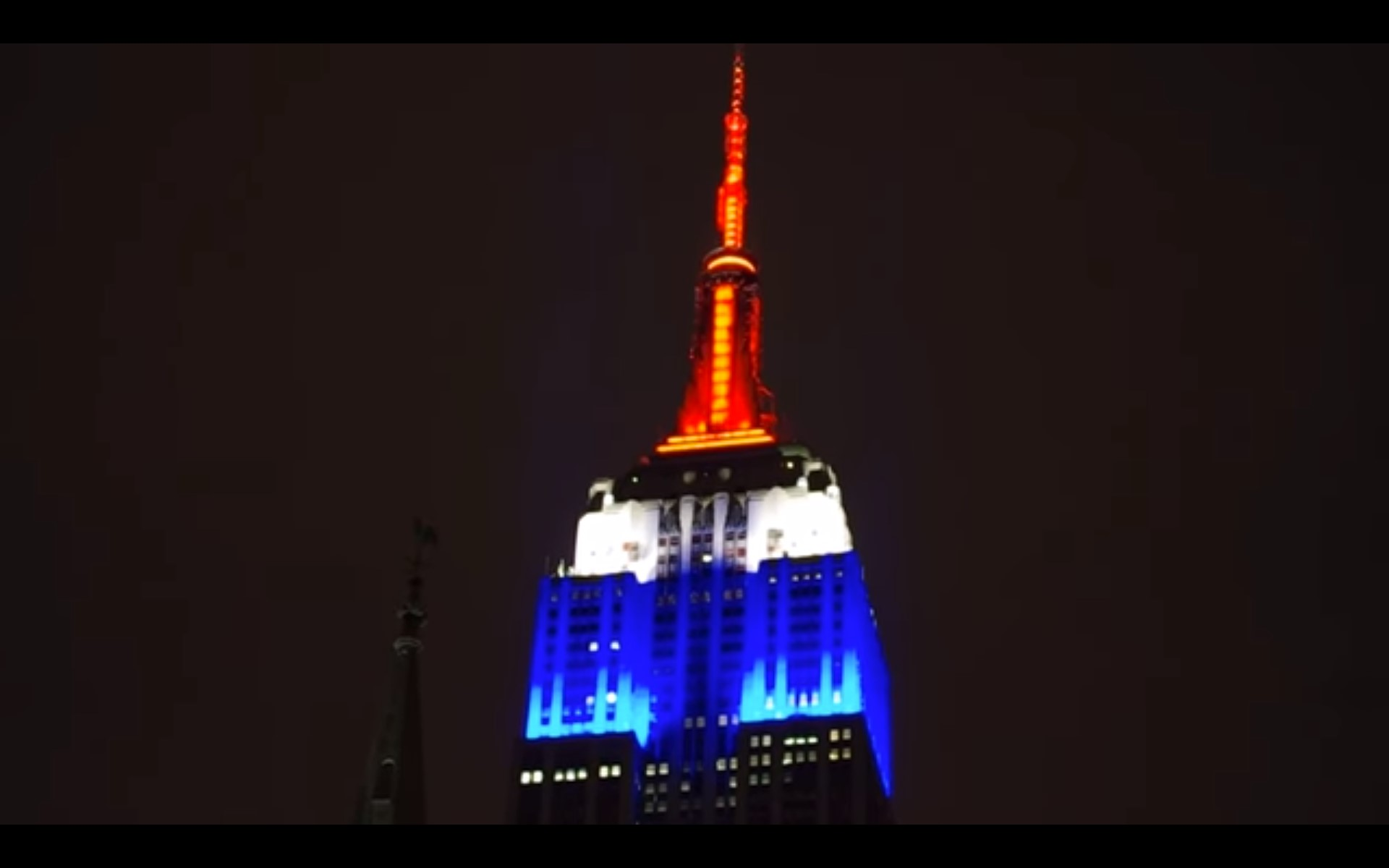
Empire State Building lighted up in the colours of French flag

- United States – U.S. President Barack Obama called the shootings horrific, while offering his support, saying, "France is America's oldest ally, and has stood shoulder to shoulder with the United States in the fight against terrorists who threaten our shared security and the world. Time and again, the French people have stood up for the universal values that generations of our people have defended. France, and the great city of Paris, where this outrageous attack took place, offer the world a timeless example that will endure well beyond the hateful vision of these killers." U.S. Secretary of State John Kerry, who has deep family ties to France, also said that the U.S. was standing in solidarity with France and offered assistance in confronting extremism. He later added that the attackers had a "rationale".

=== Oceania ===
- Australia – Elizabeth II, Queen of Australia sent "sincere condolences". Australian Prime Minister Tony Abbott offered his condolences, saying, "The government condemns the atrocity in Paris overnight. The thoughts of all Australians are with the families of those who have lost their lives in this barbaric act. Freedom of expression is the cornerstone of a free society." In April 2015, the Australian Foreign Minister, Julie Bishop, visited the offices of Charlie Hebdo and presented a framed, signed copy of the editorial cartoon by the Canberra Times cartoonist, David Pope, titled "He Drew First", depicting a terrorist standing over the body of a cartoonist (distinguished by the pen). Pope drew the cartoon as he watched the live coverage of the unfolding attack. It was widely feted in Australia as representing the sorrow of the nation.
- New Zealand – Elizabeth II, Queen of New Zealand sent "sincere condolences". New Zealand Prime Minister John Key strongly condemned the violent attack, saying, "The targeting of journalists going about their daily work is an attack on the fourth estate and the democratic principles of freedom of speech and expression, which must be strongly condemned."

=== South America ===
- Argentina – The Argentine Government strongly condemned the attack in a statement released by the Foreign Ministry. President Cristina Fernández de Kirchner added, "The Government and people of Argentina emphatically condemn the barbaric terrorist attack that took place today in the French capital. We send our profound condolences to the people of France, especially to the families of the victims." It was further stated that "Argentina remains with a steadfast commitment to peace with the hope that stronger international cooperation will help fight the scourge of terrorism in all of its forms."
- Brazil – President Dilma Rousseff expressed outrage and remorse. She said, "It is with deep regret and indignation that I learned today of the bloody and intolerable attack on 'Charlie Hebdo'. I wish to extend my condolences to the families of the victims during this time of pain and suffering. I also want extend our government's solidarity to the French people on behalf of the entire Brazilian nation."
- Chile – President Michelle Bachelet sent her condolences to the French people for the attack on Charlie Hebdo.
- Colombia – The Government of Colombia, under the Ministry of Foreign Affairs, issued a press release condemning the attack against Charlie Hebdo and declared it as an act of terrorism. The Colombian Government also lamented the attack and called France "a partner and friend of Colombia", while also defending life and the freedom of speech as "inviolable universal rights".
- Ecuador – The Ecuadorian Ministry of Foreign Affairs issued a statement condemning the Charlie Hebdo shooting and offering its condolences to France and to the French people. It also called on the suspects to be captured and judged by the authorities.
- Uruguay – The government of Uruguay strongly repudiated the attack in a statement released by the Ministry of Foreign Affairs.
- Venezuela – President Nicolas Maduro issued a statement through Twitter condemning terrorism in all its forms, adding, "The government and people of Venezuela repudiate the terrorist attack against France, and we stand by them with all our solidarity and love."

== International organisations ==
- European Union – The European Union leadership condemned the attack and expressed its solidarity with France. Newly appointed European Council President Donald Tusk expressed his shock at the shooting and said, "The European Union stands beside France after this appalling act. It is a brutal attack against our fundamental values and against the freedom of expression, a pillar of our democracy. The fight against terrorism in all its forms must continue unabated."
- Francophonie – Michaëlle Jean, the secretary general of the Organisation internationale de la Francophonie, called the killings a "frontal attack" on freedom of expression.
- International Olympic Committee – International Olympic Committee president Thomas Bach wrote a letter of support to François Hollande, expressing "shock and grief".
- Organisation of Islamic Cooperation – The Organisation of Islamic Cooperation condemned the attack, saying that it went against Islam's principles and values.
- United Nations – Secretary-General Ban Ki-moon voiced his outrage at the shooting, which he called "despicable", and described it as a "horrendous, unjustifiable and cold-blooded crime".
