= Reactions to the Manchester Arena bombing =

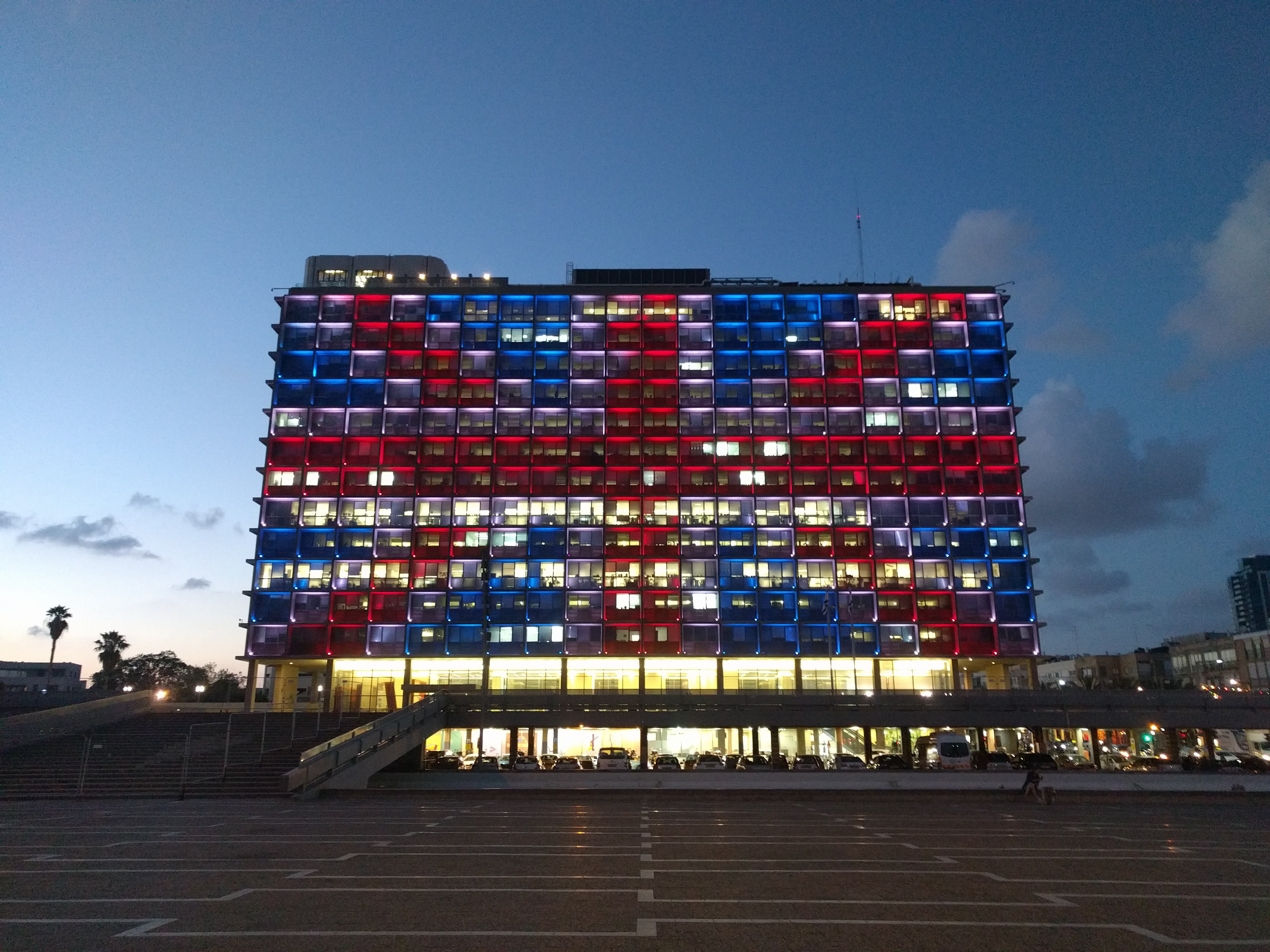
Tel Aviv City Hall illuminated in Union flag to show solidarity with UK

The reactions to the Manchester Arena bombing, which occurred on 22 May 2017, include the responses by political and religious leaders, media and the general public, both within the United Kingdom, where the Manchester Arena bombing took place, and from other nations and international organisations. Numerous notable establishments around the world also held memorials.

Ariana Grande, who had been giving a concert at the Manchester Arena shortly before the attack, issued a statement thereafter via Twitter that she was "broken," and offered to help those affected by the bombing. The general public sympathised with Grande's words and showed their overwhelming support, briefly making the tweet the most-liked tweet of all time. In addition to returning to the city to visit and FaceTime hospitalised victims, Grande subsequently organised a benefit concert, One Love Manchester, headlined by herself and a number of other artists and groups. The concert on 4 June was watched by more than 100 million people worldwide and raised proceeds exceeding £10 million in the twelve hours following its conclusion.

In the United Kingdom, Prime Minister Theresa May chaired an emergency meeting of the COBRA committee in the hours following the 22 May 2017 bombing, and the UK's threat level was raised from "severe" to "critical" for a number of days, the first time it had stood at "critical" since 2007. May also condemned the attack, along with Mayor of Greater Manchester Andy Burnham and other leading politicians and public figures. Religious groups, including the Muslim Council of Britain, also voiced their condemnation. Internationally the attack was universally condemned by world leaders. The Islamic State of Iraq and Syria issued a statement in support of the act.

Monuments in locations around the world were lit up in the colours of the Union Jack in solidarity with the UK, and silences were held to remember the victims of the bombing. A number of organisations and individuals offered tributes to the victims, including the broadcaster ITV, whose soap Coronation Street is filmed in Manchester; numerous figures from the music and entertainment industries also expressed their sympathy.

== Background ==
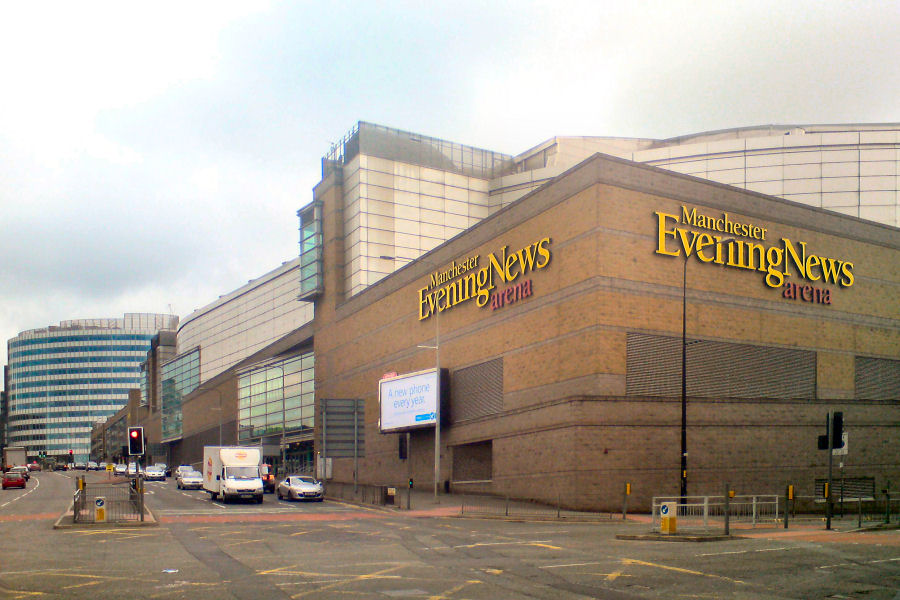
The Arena where the attack took place

The attack occurred on 22 May 2017, at around 22:30 BST (UTC+01:00), when a suicide bomber detonated an improvised explosive device in the foyer area of the Manchester Arena. The attack took place after a concert given by the US singer Ariana Grande that was part of her 2017 Dangerous Woman Tour. The concert was sold out, and up to 21,000 people were in attendance.

Many of the concertgoers were children and young people, who make up much of Grande's fanbase. Greater Manchester Police subsequently confirmed that 23 people had been killed and 800 injured, 59 of whom received hospital treatment; a number of children were confirmed to be among the fatalities. The attacker was also identified as Salman Abedi, a 22-year-old male, and British citizen of Libyan descent.

== Domestic responses ==
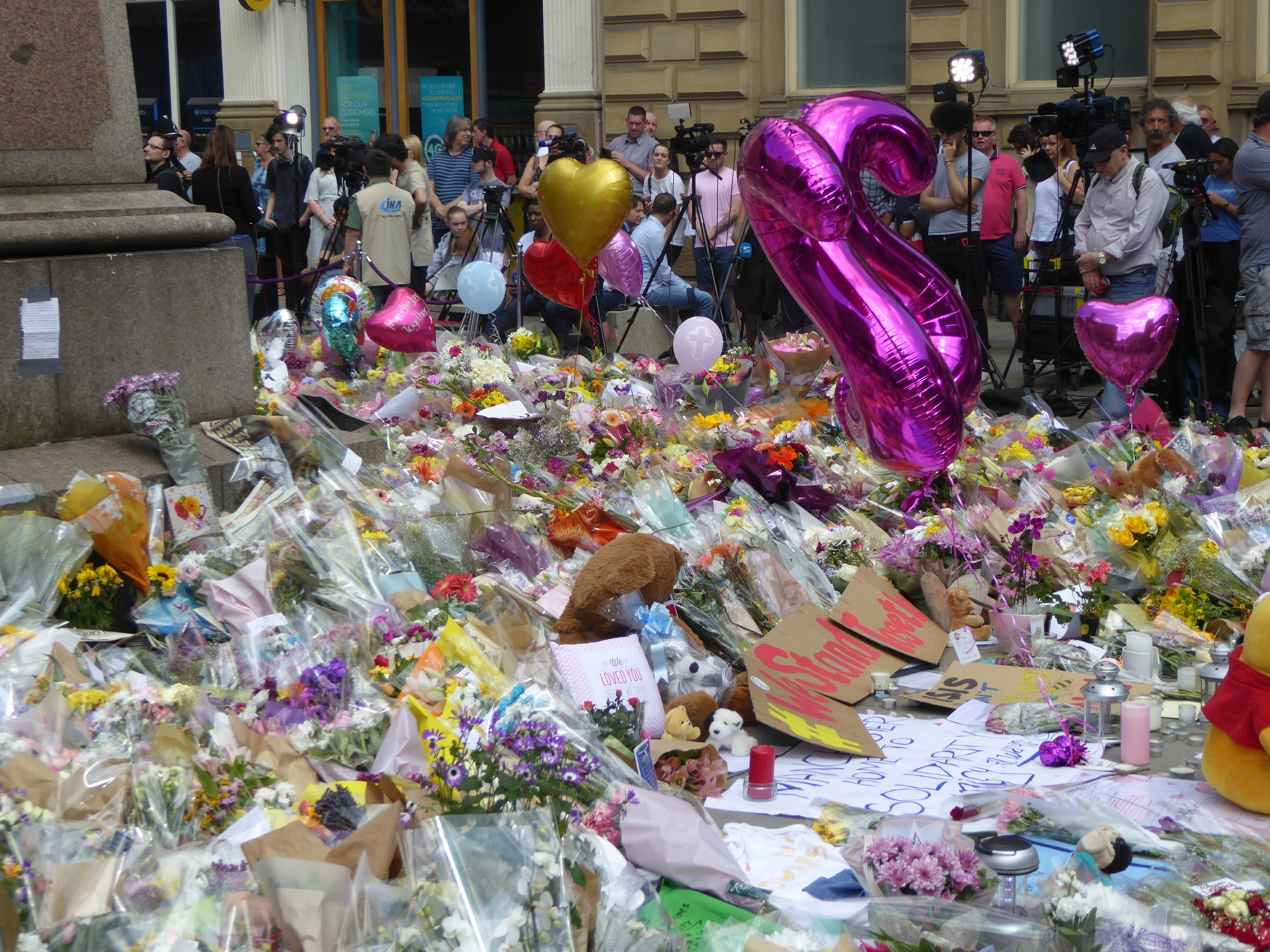
A makeshift Memorial at St Ann's Square

Campaigning for the general election was suspended by all political parties, and largely remained on hold until 26 May. (Note: National campaigning was restarted on this date, although some local activity resumed before then.) The day after the bombing, Prime Minister Theresa May announced that the UK's threat level had been raised to 'critical' for the first time in 10 years. As a result, the British Armed Forces would be deployed to support police forces at key locations in the UK. The threat level remained at critical for four days before being reduced back to severe on 27 May.

Police reported a 505% increase in anti-Muslim hate crimes in the Greater Manchester area in the month following the bombing.

Tommy Robinson, the former leader of the English Defence League organised a rally at Manchester's Piccadilly Gardens on 11 June, which was attended by several hundred people. The demonstration was held under the banner of UK Against Hate and prompted a counter demonstration by anti-fascist protesters, at which attendance was also in the hundreds. Demonstrators clashed with police, while media reported that one man had carried a pig's head. The rally drew criticism from Mayor of Greater Manchester Andy Burnham, who tweeted "These EDL-types who came today need to have a look at themselves [...] @gmpolice deserve better."

== International response ==
Interpol Secretary General Jürgen Stock said "In a fast moving investigation such as this, the clear flow of information is vital, both for police focusing on their inquiries and for the families and friends trying to establish if their loved ones have been involved, Interpol will provide whatever support is required by the UK both now and as their inquiries progress."

The Islamic State of Iraq and the Levant made an unconfirmed claim of responsibility for the attack, describing the attacker as "a soldier of the Caliphate".

== Other actions ==
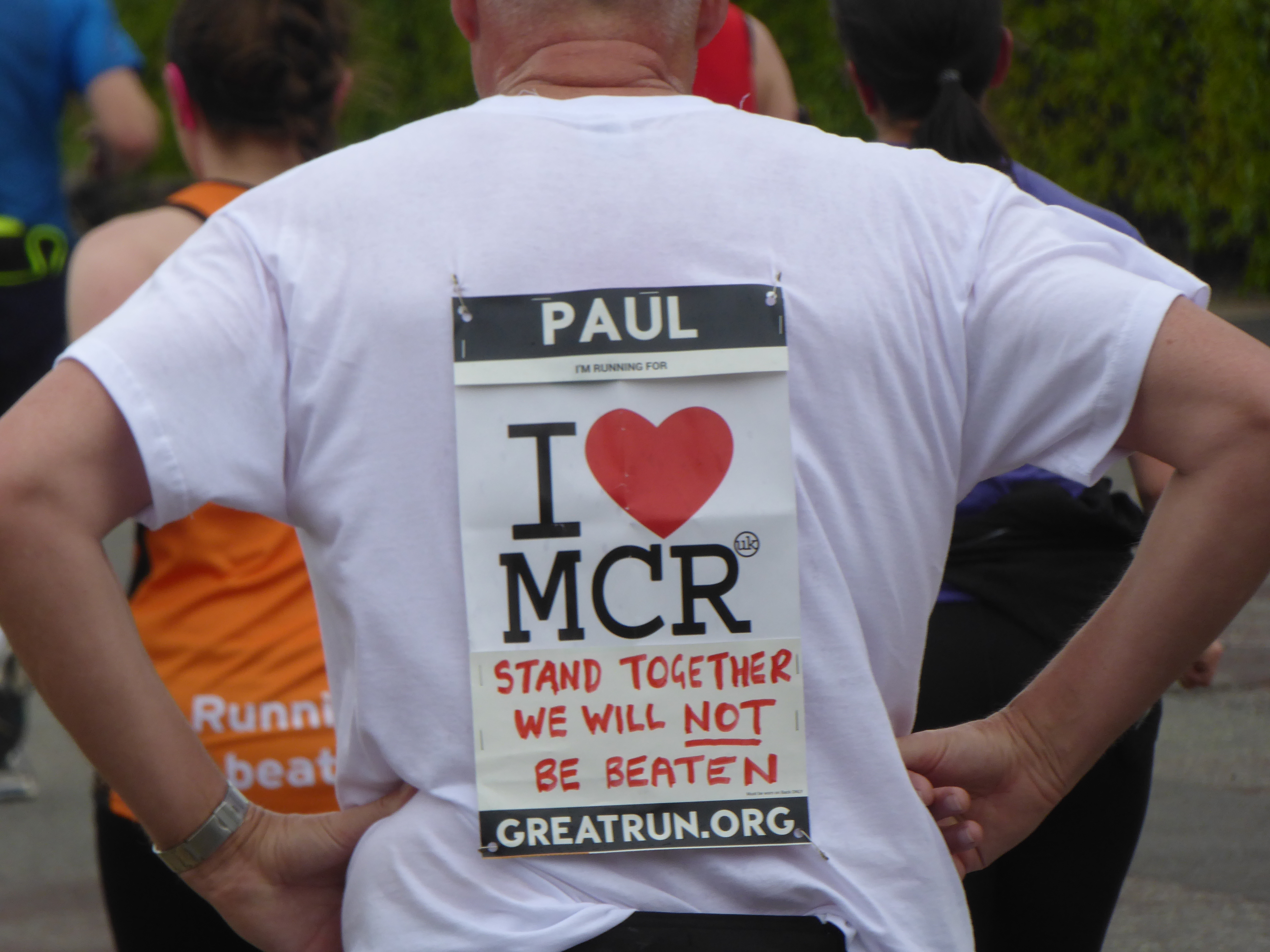
A participant on the Great Manchester Run displays an "I Love Manchester" sign on his clothing.

=== Practical responses ===
Manchester Arena, where the incident took place, issued a statement offering condolences to the people that were affected, calling the attack a "senseless tragedy". As a result, scheduled concerts in the venue later in the same week for band Take That were postponed. On 14 June, the arena confirmed that it would remain closed until September, with scheduled concerts either being cancelled, postponed or moved to other venues.

Facebook activated its "Safety Check" feature for the affected area following the incident, allowing users to mark themselves as "safe", to notify family and friends.

==== Vigils and honours ====
Monuments around the world were lit up in the colours of the Union Jack in solidarity with the UK. They included the Burj Khalifa, Tel Aviv City Hall, Jet d'Eau, Library of Birmingham, Amsterdam Central Station, The Orlando Eye, Toronto sign, Brandenburg Gate, the Adelaide Oval, the Story Bridge in Brisbane, the Petrin Tower in Prague, and the HSBC building in Hong Kong. The lights of the Eiffel Tower, The Colosseum, the Trevi Fountain and Empire State Building were turned off as a sign of respect. The New York Yankees baseball club played "God Save the Queen" before their match against the Kansas City Royals as a tribute to the victims.

On 23 May, there was a vigil in Albert Square, Manchester, at which a minute of silence was observed followed by speeches from members of the community and from Andy Burnham, Greater Manchester Police Chief Constable Ian Hopkins, and poet Tony Walsh, who performed a poem called This Is the Place. Also on stage was the Home Secretary Amber Rudd, Opposition Leader Jeremy Corbyn, Speaker of the House of Commons John Bercow, and Liberal Democrats leader Tim Farron. Various vigils were held in other places in the UK too, including London, Glasgow, Birmingham, Belfast, Coventry, Liverpool, Sheffield, Derby, Newcastle upon Tyne, Bolton, Swindon, Leeds, and Tarleton.

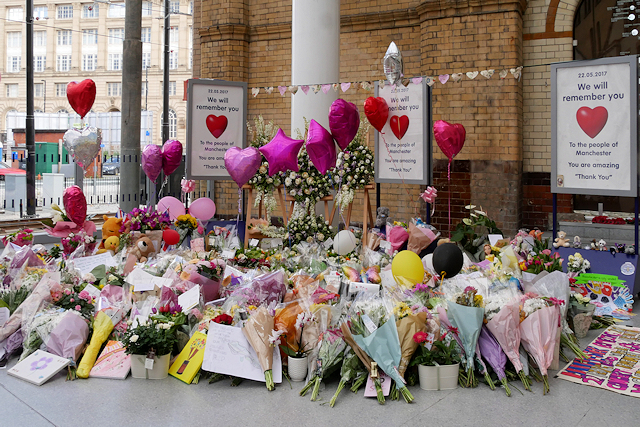
Floral tributes in Manchester Victoria station, adjacent to the arena, in early June 2017; the tributes obscure the World War memorials, with the Arena memorial becoming a permanent fixture next to it

For their parts in responding to the attacks, Detective Chief Inspector Teresa Lam and Special Sergeant Jared Simpson were awarded the British Empire Medal, and Chief Inspector Dale Sexton received the Queen's Police Medal. Robert Gallagher, a police forensics manager, was made an MBE; Colin Kelsey, who led the NHS response, an OBE.

=== Ariana Grande ===
Ariana Grande, whose concert had ended shortly before the explosion, posted on her official Twitter account: "broken. from the bottom of my heart, i am so so sorry. i don't have words." Her management team added that they "mourn the lives of children and loved ones taken by this cowardly act". The tweet briefly became the most-liked tweet in history.

In a statement released on 26 May, Grande said that she would return to Manchester to host a benefit concert to raise funds for the victims, and that she would "extend my hand and heart and everything I possibly can give to you and yours, should you want or need my help in any way". The One Love Manchester concert was subsequently announced for 4 June at Old Trafford Cricket Ground, with Grande being joined by artists including Coldplay, Katy Perry, Justin Bieber, Take That, Miley Cyrus and Pharrell Williams. Proceeds aided the We Love Manchester Emergency Fund, established after the attack by Manchester City Council and the British Red Cross. Tickets for the event sold out within twenty minutes of going on sale. In addition, some tickets were reserved for people who had been at the Manchester Arena Concert. Following the attack in London the day before the show, Greater Manchester Police announced that security would be tighter than planned. The concert was televised, and watched by more than 100 million people worldwide. It raised proceeds exceeding £10 million ($13 million) in the twelve hours following its conclusion.

As part of a new scheme to recognise people who have made an outstanding contribution to Manchester, on 13 June, Manchester City Council announced plans to honour Grande with honorary citizenship of the city. On 12 July, members of the City Council voted unanimously to give her honorary citizenship.

=== Public figures ===
Columnist Katie Hopkins suggested the need for a "final solution", which was interpreted by some as calling for ethnic cleansing of the UK's Muslim population. However she then deleted her tweet and replaced the words "final solution" with "true solution". LBC, a London-based talk radio station on which Hopkins had hosted a Sunday morning programme since April 2016, subsequently announced that she would be leaving their presenting lineup immediately.

Comedian Rufus Hound wrote several tweets accusing the Conservative Party of committing the attack for electoral gains, comparing it to the Reichstag fire of 1933. He subsequently retracted the conspiracy theory following criticism from other Twitter users.

Wendy Williams paid tribute on her TV show on May 30, as her fan Martyn Hett was supposed to be in the audience of her show that day and the day before, and Wendy left a seat open . "[Hett] saved for two years to have fabulous time in New York and come to our show. He called it a trip of a lifetime on his social media. ... He’s remembered as a man who loved life, like all my people, who loved life with passion, courage and laughter. ... So Martyn, in honor of you, we're keeping that chair open. And our thoughts and prayers out to you, [Wendy points, and looks up,] and your family."

==== Music industry ====
Eminem and Justin Timberlake helped raise over $2 million for the victims. Liam Gallagher announced a solo gig at Manchester's O2 Ritz, the proceeds of which would be donated to a fund established by the families of the victims. Mariah Carey sent condolences to the family and friends of victim Martyn Hett, who was an open fan of hers that once met her at a fan meet-up.

=== Religious groups ===
At a public vigil held on Tuesday 23 May 2017 in Albert Square, Manchester the Bishop of Manchester, David Walker, shared a platform with Imam Irfan Chishti of Manchester Central Mosque and a number of other local religious leaders to jointly condemn the attack and to remember the victims. British Muslim groups, such as the Muslim Council of Britain and Ahmadi Muslims UK condemned the attack and expressed their condolences.

=== Manchester Tattoo Appeal ===
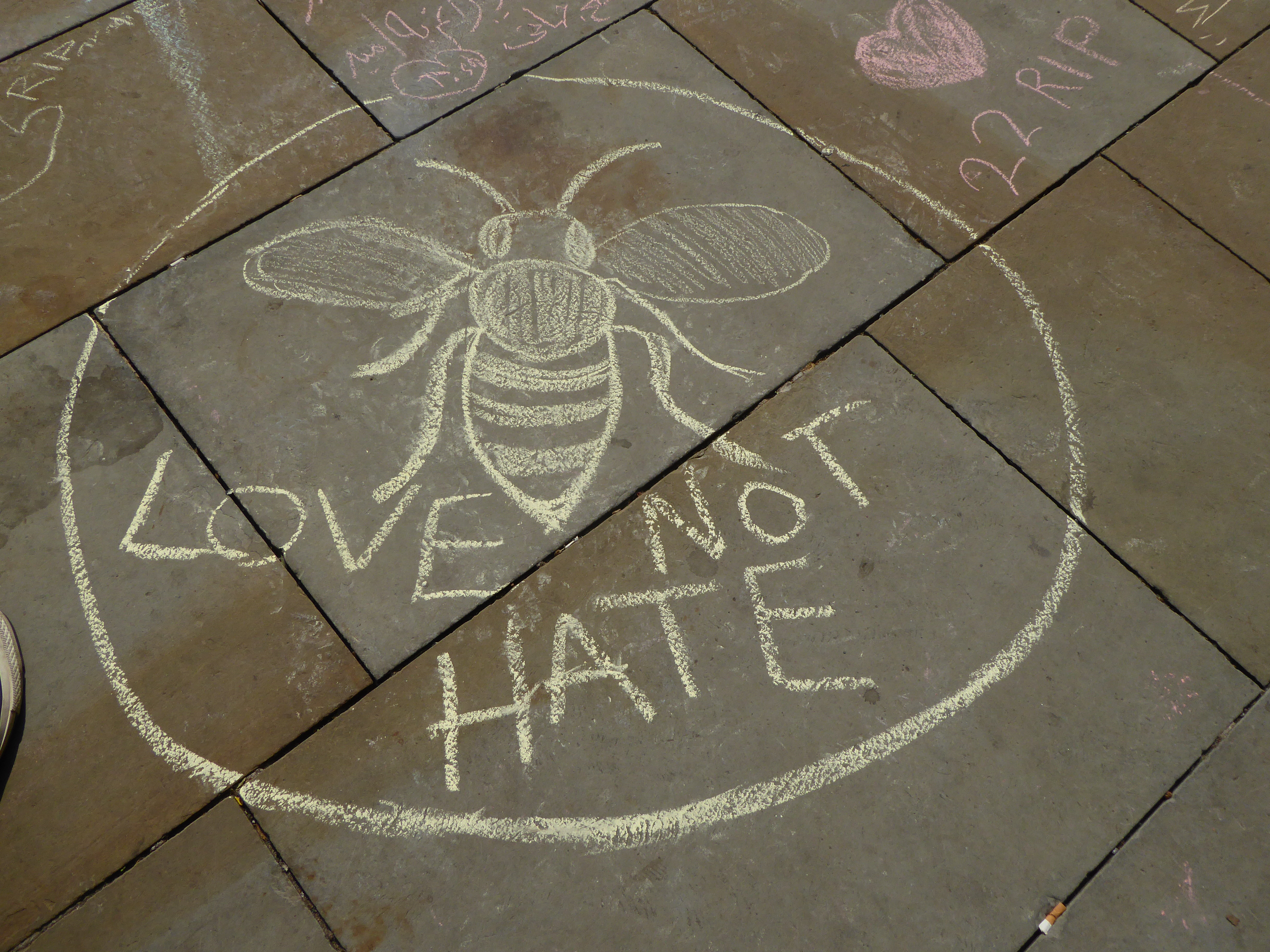
"Love not hate" chalk graffiti on the pavement in St Ann's Square, featuring the worker bee symbol

The worker bee has been a symbol of Manchester since the Industrial Revolution, when it was adopted in the city's coat of arms to represent industriousness, and bee motifs have been used to decorate various architectural features and street furniture in the city. In the aftermath of the bombing, the bee began to gain in popularity as a symbol of public unity against terrorism, appearing on protest banners and graffiti. A campaign was launched by a tattoo artist in Stalybridge to offer tattoos of the worker bee symbol for a £50 donation to support victims of the bombing. The Manchester Tattoo Appeal rapidly gained in popularity and spread to other tattoo parlours in Manchester and elsewhere. Grande was among those to have a bee tattoo, posting an image of it on her social media shortly after the first anniversary of the attack, along with the word "forever".

=== Reopening of Manchester Arena ===
On 16 August 2017, it was announced that Manchester Arena would reopen on 9 September, with a benefit concert featuring Noel Gallagher and other acts associated with the North West. On 5 September it was announced the concert would be broadcast live on BBC Radio Manchester, Key 103 and Radio X.
