= Holly Dagres =

Iranian-American analyst and commentator

- Born: Los Angeles, California
- Education: University of California, Los Angeles; American University in Cairo
- Occupations: Analyst; Commentator
- Website: Official website

Holly Dagres (Los Angeles, California) is an Iranian-American analyst and commentator on the Middle East with a focus on Iran. She is a senior fellow at the Washington-based think tank, the Washington Institute for Near East Policy. She is also the curator for the weekly newsletter, The Iranist.

== Early life and education ==
Dagres was born in Los Angeles to an Iranian immigrant mother and an American father. In 1999, she moved to Tehran, Iran. Dagres spent her teenage years in Iran, from 1999 to 2006, during which time she graduated from Tehran International School. Dagres received her bachelor's degree in political science and French from the University of California, Los Angeles and her master's degree in political science from the American University in Cairo.

== Career ==
Early in Dagres' career, she communicated extensively through social media; in 2015, Your Middle East called Dagres one of the "must follow" Instagram users of the Middle East. Her Instagram account was called one of the "8 stunning Instagram accounts that shed light on the real Iran" by Elan Magazine. It was also featured by Al Jazeera English's "Stream of the Week" as a glimpse into Iran.

As of May 2017, Dagres was a contributing editor at the Cairo Review of Global Affairs. Also as of May 2017, Dagres work had appeared, per her personal declaration, in numerous publications including Al Jazeera, Al-Monitor, Buzzfeed, Foreign Policy, the Huffington Post, and Voice of America.

In fall of 2017, Dagres posted a photo of her late Iranian grandmother with hashtag #GrandparentsNotTerrorists to show solidarity with opponents of U.S. President Donald Trump's Executive Order 13769, also known as the Muslim Ban; after it went viral, she and a friend started the 'Banned Grandmas' Instagram account to remind Americans that the ban is ongoing and continues to affect American families.

As of 2018, and continuing at least through about the first week of December 2024, Dagres worked with the Washington-based think tank, the Atlantic Council, working with its Rafik Hariri Center and Middle East programs, and as "a nonresident senior fellow specializing in Iranian affairs, the editor of the... Programs’ IranSource and MENASource publications, and the curator for the weekly newsletter, The Iranist". As of December 2024, Dagres regularly conducted interviews for print, radio, and television, including for the BBC News, Bloomberg, CNN, NBC News, and NPR, and "[h]er work on Iran" has otherwise appeared "in numerous publications, including Foreign Policy, [The] Guardian, The New York Times, TIME, and [T]he Washington Post".

As of February 2026, Dagres was appearing as "the Libitzky Family Senior Fellow in The Washington Institute's Viterbi Program on Iran and U.S. Policy".

== Personal life ==
In 2009, Dagres entered the Miss California USA 2010 beauty pageant as Miss Northridge.
