= Ruhollah Khomeini's life in exile =

1964–1979 period for the Iranian leader

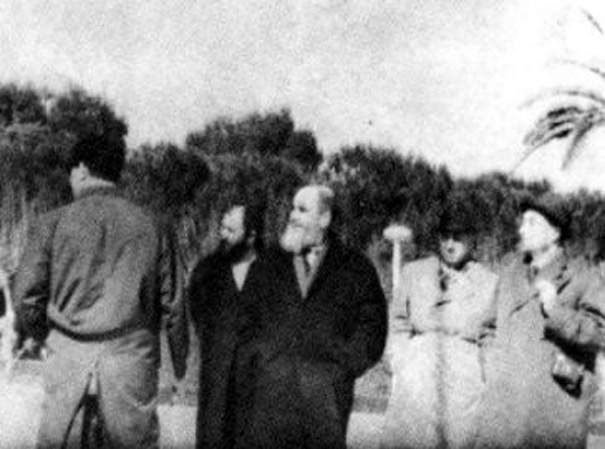
Khomeini with his son, Mostafa, in exile at Bursa, Turkey without clerical dress

Ruhollah Khomeini was in exile in Turkey, Iraq and France from 1964 to 1979. Mohammad Reza Pahlavi had arrested him twice for dissent from his "White Revolution" announced in 1963. Khomeini was invited back to Iran by the government, and returned to Tehran from exile in 1979.

On 4 November 1964, Khomeini was secretly taken to Ankara and then to Bursa, Turkey. On 5 September 1965, he moved to Najaf, Iraq and stayed there until Saddam Hussein deported him in 1978. Finally, he was exiled by the pressure of Mohammad Reza Pahlavi to Neauphle-le-Château, Paris on 6 October 1978.

== Political activity before exile ==
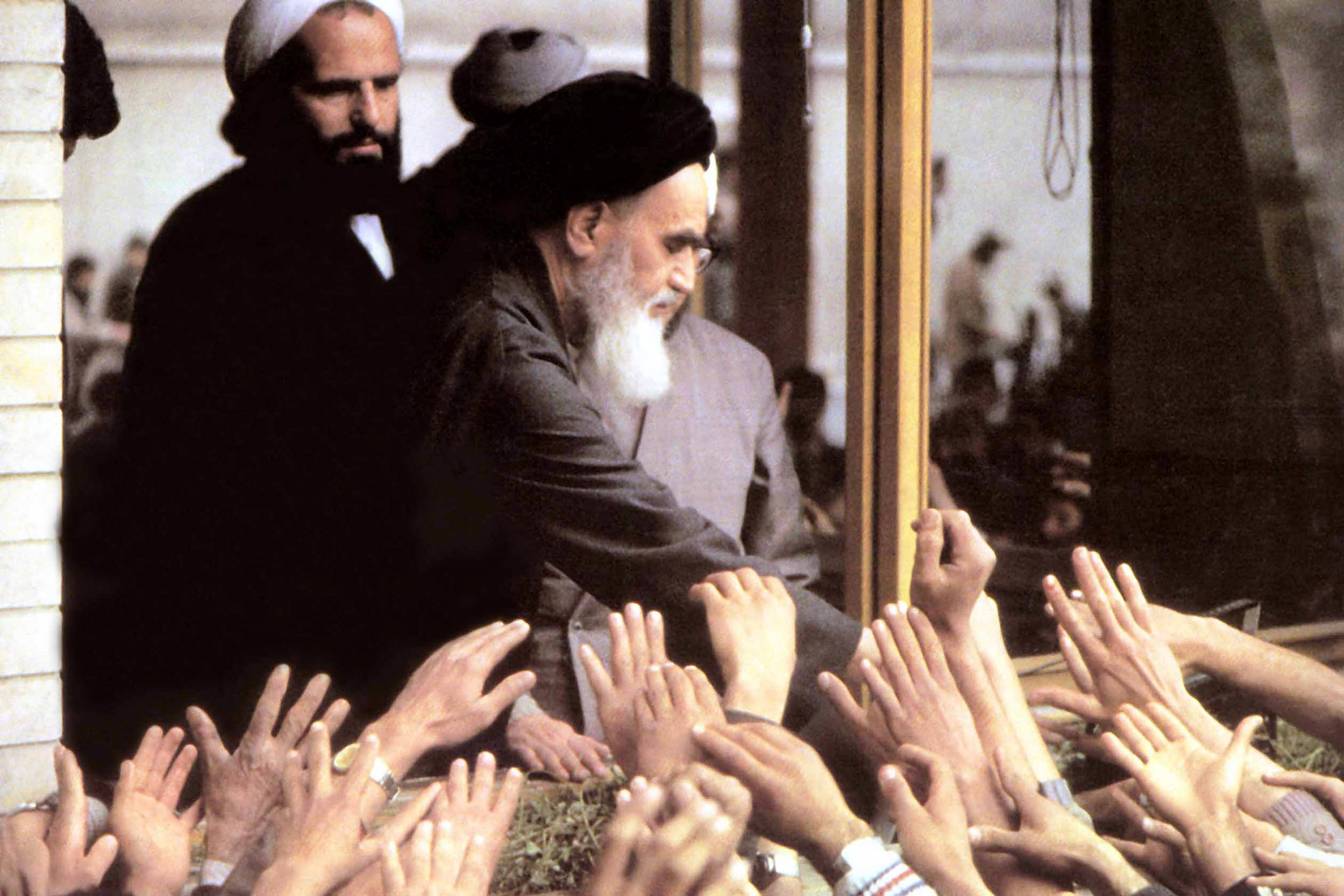
Khomeini with supporters

In 1944 Khomeini published his first book, Kashf al-Asrar (“Secrets Unveiled”), criticising secularisation under Reza Shah Pahlavi and advocating for the power of Allah to establish and disestablish governments. After the death of Hossein Borujerdi in 1961, Khomeini became the leading Marja'.

In January 1963 the Shah announced the White Revolution, a six-point program of reform. It called for land reform, nationalization of the forests, the sale of state-owned enterprises to private interests, electoral changes to enfranchise women and allow non-Muslims to hold office, profit-sharing in industry, and a literacy campaign in the nation's schools. On the other hand, he and many religious leaders considered the revolution had trends of westernizing the country and would in their mind threaten the traditional Islamic lifestyle of the common folk.

The Shah himself traveled to Qom and announced the clergy black reactionaries worse than the red reactionaries and a hundred times more treacherous than the (communist) Tudeh party during his speech. On 26 January 1963, he held a referendum to get the appearance of public support in which 5.6 million people voted against 4100 people for the 1963 Iranian referendum. The referendum was a good excuse for the government to take tougher practical action against the clergy and on 22 March 1963, coinciding with the anniversary of the death of Imam Ja'far al-Sadiq, the Shah's guards cracked down harshly and attacked the Feyziyeh School, whereby students and faculty who were opposed to shah rule were killed. According to Daniel Brumberg, the regime persuaded the thugs to attack the students of Feyziyeh School. On the afternoon of Ashura (3 June 1963), Khomeini presented a lecture at the Feyziyeh School in which he denounced the Shah as a "wretched miserable man", advised him to change his ways, otherwise the day will come that people will be happy to see him leave, drawing parallels to the caliph Yazid, who is perceived as a 'tyrant' by Shias.

Two days afterward, at 3 am on 5 June 1963, Khomeini was detained and transferred to Tehran. When this news was broadcast, large protest demonstrations were held in Qom, Tehran, Mashhad, Varamin, Kashan, and other cities. The Shah's guards killed and injured several people. That event is now referred to as the Movement of 15 Khordad. On 3 August, the Shah released Khomeini from jail and placed him under house arrest until 7 April 1964.

On 26 October 1964, Khomeini condemned the Shah because of the diplomatic immunity he granted to American citizens, civilian or military personnel in Iran. At 5.30 pm on 4 November 1964, Khomeini was arrested by SAVAK. He was then taken to Mehrabad international airport in Tehran and flown to Ankara Airport.

== Life in exile ==
=== Turkey ===
After arriving in Ankara, Khomeini was taken to the Bolvar Palace Hotel and the next morning he was moved to another building on Atatürk Street.

A week after his arrival in Turkey, Khomeini was sent to Bursa and he stayed there for eleven months. He was hosted by a Turkish Military intelligence officer, Colonel Ali Cetiner, in his own residence. According to Turkish law, clerical dress was banned and Khomeini was never allowed to meet people. On 3 December 1964, his son, Mostafa, joined him. In his first days in Turkey, Khomeini was extremely angry at the secular dress of Turkish women, but he learned to adapt quickly to his new surroundings. Despite the bans on contact with Khomeini, he and his students – who included future President Akbar Hashemi Rafsanjani – would plot the successful assassination of Prime Minister Hassan-Ali Mansur as soon as Khomeini left Iran.

In Bursa, Khomeini had a great deal of spare time. He continued his studies and for the first time moved away from the "traditional" view of clerical involvement in politics. He wrote his second book, Tahrir al-Wasilah, and began to receive huge donations from Iranian supporters who already opposed the Shah's policies. The extent of donations to the Ayatollah caused the Shah and Turkish government to lift the ban on communication with his during the summer of 1965, and several clergy visited Khomeini – who was wearing secular garb – in Istanbul in 1965.

On September 5, 1965, Khomeini left Turkey and went to Najaf in Iraq.

The reasons for Khomeini's exile to Najaf by the Shah's regime are described as:

1. The regime hoped to diminish the role of Khomeini through competition with Iraqi Ulama like Abu al-Qasim al-Khoei
2. Because of intense pressure and popular protests.
3. Scholars and Khomeini's followers began to communicate with him in Bursa, donating so much money that the Ayatollah went from virtually penniless to very rich
4. A SAVAK agent thought that his presence made the Turkish people hostile toward the Shah's regime.

=== Iraq ===
On 8 September 1965, Khomeini entered Iraq and would spend thirteen years there. Iraq did not have good political relations with the Shah.

Khomeini and Mostafa entered Iraq. He went to Kadhimiya and stayed in the company of Mohammad al-Husayni al-Shirazi for two days before going to Karbala. From there he went to the city of Najaf. Initially, Khomeini was isolated by Iraq's Shi'a clergy because of his status as a foreigner and his differentiating mindset; however, after a while Muhammad Baqir al-Sadr and other Iraqi clerics would join with Khomeini because they shared similar aims in establishing an Islamic state. Khomeini would also be helped in his first days in Iraq by then-President Abdul Salam Arif, who allowed the Ayatollah to set up and control an Iranian opposition radio station.

After a while, his wife Khadijeh Saqafi and second son Ahmad Khomeini joined them in Najaf. Khomeini began teaching Fiqh in the Sheikh Morteza Ansari Madrassah which captivated students mainly from Iran, Iraq, India, Pakistan, Afghanistan, and the Persian Gulf states. In April 1967, Khomeini wrote the two letters, once to Ulama in order to persuade them to attempt to overthrow the Shah's regime and another to Amir-Abbas Hoveyda, protesting the coronation of the Shah and condemning him for continued violation of both Islam and the constitution. Also, Khomeini forbade any type of dealing with Israel. Four years into his Iraqi exile, between 21 January and 8 February (1970), Khomeini gave lectures about Vilayat-e Faqīh ya Hukumat-i Islami, which in Shia Islam hold that Islam gives a faqīh (Islamic jurist) custodianship over people.

This became Khomeini's most famous and influential work, and laid out his ideas on governance (at that time):

- That the laws of society should be made up only of the laws of God (Sharia), which cover "all human affairs" and "provide instruction and establish norms" for every "topic" in "human life."
- Since Shariah, or Islamic law, is the proper law, those holding government posts should have knowledge of Sharia. Since Islamic jurists or faqīh have studied and are the most knowledgeable in Sharia, the country's ruler should be a faqīh who "surpasses all others in knowledge" of Islamic law and justice, (known as a marja'), as well as having intelligence and administrative ability. Rule by monarchs and/or assemblies of "those claiming to be representatives of the majority of the people" (i.e. elected parliaments and legislatures) has been proclaimed "wrong" by Islam.
- This system of clerical rule is necessary to prevent injustice, corruption, oppression by the powerful over the poor and weak, innovation and deviation of Islam and Sharia law; and also to destroy anti-Islamic influence and conspiracies by non-Muslim foreign powers. The theory in Shia Islam which holds that Islam gives a faqīh (Islamic jurist) custodianship over people.

To form an Islamic government, two things were needed:

1. Overthrow of the Shah
2. Establishment of Shi'i theocracy

Khomeini had mooted this theory as early as the middle 1940s in his first book Kashf al-Asrar.

From 1971 to 1975, Khomeini demonstrated vehement opposition to the 2,500 year celebration of the Persian Empire, and the changing of the Iranian calendar from Hijri to Imperial (Shahanshahi). During this era, the Shah considered exiling Khomeini, to India, because he believed doing so would make communication between Khomeini and his followers in Iran impossible, but for unknown reasons this plan was never executed. Khomeini was also faced with hostility from the Ba'ath regime, which began to be hostile to his brand of Islam as the Shah.

In November 1977, the Shah's overthrow began with the assassination of Khomeini's son, Mostafa, by SAVAK, although this is disputed, inasmuch SAVAK had numerous opportunities to eliminate Khomeini but never did so.

=== France ===
On September 24, 1978, according to a meeting held in New York City between Iraqi and Iranian foreign ministers, Khomeini was forced by the then Iraqi vice-president Saddam Hussein to leave Najaf, although the Shah and Hussein had begun plans to expel Khomeini as early as 1975. Khomeini preferred to go to another Muslim country, and obtained a visa for Kuwait, but was turned back at the border because he had obtained the visa under the name “Ruhollah Mustafavi”. Khomeini's next preference was to go to Syria – where some sources say he had intended to permanently reside even when he attempted to enter Kuwait – but the lingering influence of Ahmed Hassan al-Bakr in Iraqi and Syrian politics meant that Syrian government would not accept him. Khomeini then considered going to Bahrain, India, Pakistan or Algeria, but his US-educated nationalist aide, Ebrahim Yazdi, argued that Khomeini should move to the West because of the greater communication opportunities offered there, with Paris offering the best option for communication with the world of his revolutionary message.

On October 11, 1978, after Khomeini was moved to Neauphle-le-Château outside Paris, France. The purpose of the decision was to keep Islamic clerics and Ulama faraway from Khomeini but the strategy backfired. With fewer restrictions against freedom of speech in France, Khomeini had a better opportunity to communicate his message more efficiently to people in Iran in France. Because of journalists and the press in France, and the approval of foreign policy advisers in the United Kingdom and the United States and a lack of trust in Shah to support long-term British and American interests, Khomeini's speeches were published rapidly in global media. Khomeini wanted to communicate with people that continued protests against the government.

On 11 November 1978, Khomeini assigned to form a revolutionary council which was led by Ayatollah Beheshti and Ayatollah Mottahari. Between August and December 1978, strikes and demonstrations paralyzed Iran, so that the Shah left the country for exile on 16 January 1979, as the last Iranian monarch, leaving his duties to a regency council and an opposition-based prime minister, Shapour Bakhtiar.

== Return from exile ==
In January 1979, Mohammed Reza Pahlavi left Iran, and Khomeini was invited to return by the government. He did so on Thursday, 1 February 1979.

== See also ==
- Ideocracy
- Ruhollah Khomeini's letter to Mikhail Gorbachev
- Ruhollah Khomeini's residency (Jamaran)
