= Forty Hadith of Ruhullah Khomeini =

1940 book by Ruhollah Khomeini

Forty Hadith
- Front cover of English translation of Forty Hadith
- Author: Ayatollah Khomeini
- Language: English
- Published: Create Space Independent Publishing Platform
- Media type: Book
- ISBN: 978-1502501691

Forty Hadith (Persian: شرح چهل حدیث) is a 1940 book written by Ruhollah Khomeini, the founder of the Islamic Republic of Iran. It describes his personal interpretations of the forty traditions attributed to Muhammad, the Prophet of Islam, and The Twelve Imams.

The book was originally a pamphlet that Khomeini used to teach to his students at the Feyziyeh School in Qom Seminary.

== Background ==
Islamic scholars, motivated by a tradition from the prophet of Islam, Muhammad, which promises Divine Rewards for scholars who collect forty traditions, compile hadith narrations in groups of forty. The best-known example of this genre is Imam Nawawi's Forty Hadith, which was written to include all the fundamentals of the sacred Islamic law.

Khomeini completed his collection in 1939, and it was first published in 1940. He quotes the Arabic text of each hadith in the book with its Persian translation and discusses its various themes.

== Themes ==
Thirty-three of the hadith Khomeini selected pertain to Islamic ethics, including acts which bring reward or punishment. The other seven focus on beliefs and concepts related to the Theology of Twelvers. Among the themes identified by Khomeini are Ostentation, Pride, Envy, Anger, Hypocrisy, Desire and Hope, the Kinds of Hearts, Walayah (guardianship) and Love of the world.

== Translations ==
In 2009, the book was translated into French with the assistance of Iran's Cultural Center in Paris, and the translation was published by the Institute for Compilation and Publication of Ayatollah Khomeini's Works. Four years later, the book was translated into Kurdish by Ali Husseini and published by the Islamic Republic of Iran’s cultural attaché in Turkey. It has also been translated into English and Urdu.

== See also ==
- Islamic Government: Governance of the Jurist
- Tahrir al-Wasilah
- The Unveiling of Secrets
- The Greatest fight: Combat with the Self
- Alef-Laam Khomeini
- Kashf al-Asrar
