= Al-Qadhi Hussein ibn Muhammad =

(died 1069)

al-Qadi Husayn ibn Muhammad Rahimahullah

Personal life
- Born: Husayn ibn Muhammad ibn Ahmad al-Marwarrudhi; Unknown Unknown
- Died: 462 AH = 1069 Marw al-Rudh, Ghurid state

Religious life
- Religion: Islam
- Denomination: Sunni Islam
- Jurisprudence: Shafi'i

al-Qadi Husayn ibn Muhammad ibn Ahmad Abu Ali al-Marwarrudhi (died 462 AH, corresponding to 1069 CE), was the leading Shafi'i jurist of his time and one of the scholars known as the ashab al-wujuh (jurists qualified to derive legal positions within the Shafi'i school). He studied Islamic jurisprudence under Abu Bakr al-Qaffal, and was, together with Abu Ali, among his most distinguished students. He also transmitted hadith from Abu Nu'aym al-Isfahani.

Abd al-Ghafir said of him: "He was the jurist of Khurasan, and his age was an era marked by him."

Abd al-Karim al-Rafi'i wrote in al-Tadhnib that he was "a great scholar, deeply versed in subtle matters," and one of the distinguished and fortunate scholars. He was also known by the title "the scholar of the ummah."

Al-Nawawi wrote in his Tahdhib al-Asma' wa-l-Lughat that Qadi Husayn authored al-Ta'liq al-Kabir, which contained extensive and valuable legal discussions and numerous derivative rulings. He also authored the well-known Fatawa, Asrar al-Fiqh ("Secrets of Jurisprudence"), and other works. Among his students were Abu Sa'd al-Mutawalli and al-Baghawi. Al-Nawawi also stated that it is said that Abu al-Ma'ali al-Juwayni studied jurisprudence under him. When "the Qadi" is mentioned without qualification in the works of the later jurists of Marw, Qadi Husayn is intended.

Al-Nawawi stated:

Know that whenever "the Qadi" is mentioned in the works of the later Khurasanian jurists, such as al-Nihaya, al-Tatimma, al-Tahdhib, the works of al-Ghazali, and similar works, what is meant is Qadi Husayn. Whenever "the Qadi" is mentioned in the works of the middle-period jurists of Iraq, what is meant is Qadi Abu Hamid al-Marwazi. When it is mentioned in the works on legal theory by our scholars, what is meant is Abu Bakr al-Baqillani, the Maliki imam in matters of jurisprudence. When it is mentioned in the works of the Mu'tazilites, or in the works of our scholars of legal theory when reporting the views of the Mu'tazilites, what is meant is Abu Ali al-Jubba'i, known as the Qadi al-Jubba'i. And Allah knows best.

— Al-Nawawi, Tahdhib al-Asma' wa-l-Lughat, 1/165

Ibn al-Ahdal stated that whenever "the Qadi" is mentioned in works dealing with the substantive law of the Shafi'i school, Qadi Husayn is intended. In works on usul al-fiqh of Sunni scholars, it refers to al-Baqillani. When "the two Qadis" are mentioned, it refers to Qadi Husayn and Qadi Abd al-Jabbar, the Mu'tazilite scholar. When "the Shaykh" is mentioned, it refers to Abu al-Hasan al-Ash'ari. When the jurists use "the Qadi" without further qualification, it refers to Abu Muhammad al-Juwayni, the father of Imam al-Haramayn al-Juwayni.
