= Sharh Sahih Muslim =

Sharh Sahih Muslim (Arabic: شرح صحيح مسلم; Commentary of Sahih Muslim) may refer to:

- Fath al-Mulhim
- Takmilat Fath al-Mulhim
- Al Minhaj bi Sharh Sahih Muslim
