= Forty hadith =

Hadith collections arranged in sets of forty

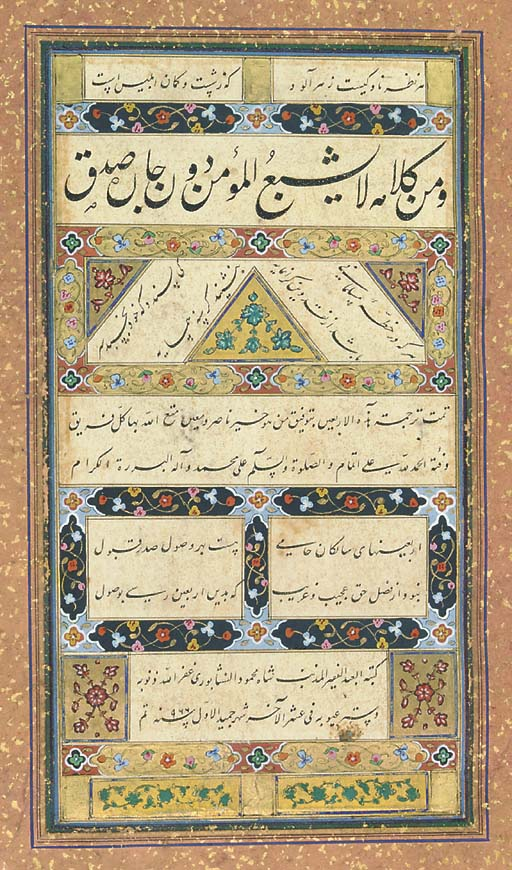
A 16th-century forty hadith manuscript copied by Shah Mahmud Nishapuri

Forty hadith (Arabic: الأربعينات, romanized: al'arbaeinat) is a genre of hadith literature. First attested in the 8th century CE, the genre emerged in response to a hadith promising great boons to anyone who preserved forty hadiths for the Muslim people. It remained in wide use as a means of communicating Islamic teachings in a readily accessible format, with hundreds of works attested through the sixteenth century CE. Although the genre has been less prevalent with the canonization of hadiths, works continue to be edited and published.

The name notwithstanding, forty hadith compilations may contain as few as 29 hadiths or as many as 48. Compilations differ in their focus, with some having no central topic, others revolving around specific aspects of Islamic teachings, and still others focusing on particular individuals. The most widely read work of the genre is Al-Nawawi's Forty Hadith, produced by Al-Nawawi in the 13th century CE.

== Basis ==
Forty hadith compilations are one of eleven genres of hadith literature. Such compilations emerged in response to a hadith, known through twenty-three variants, with a further seventeen variations of these variants. Two renditions of the hadith follow:

Whoever preserves for my umma (people) forty hadiths about the instructions of her religion, God will resurrect him on Judgement Day as a learned and knowing (person).

Whoever of my community preserves forty hadith of my tradition, I will be his intercessor [with God] on the day of judgment.

In Islamic studies, this hadith is considered da'if (weak). However, it is known through an expansive isnād (chain of transmission), being reported by such persons as Abd Allah ibn Mas'ud, Ibn Abbas, and Abd Allah ibn Amr ibn al-As. As the hadith has been widely reported, it has historically been accepted for efforts that serve the Islamic community.

Based on this hadith, several boons were attributed to the compilation of forty hadiths: being recorded by Allah as a jurist, being resurrected on the Day of Judgement, and being allowed to enter Jannah through whichever gate one desires. Some authors used forty hadith compilations to seek the prayers of readers, or to find a cure to disease. Other advantages of the forty-hadith genre include preserving the Sunnah and teaching Islamic doctrine in a readily accessible format, and in some instances maintaining a detailed record of the chain of transmission for particular hadiths.

== Description ==
The name notwithstanding, works identified as part of the forty hadith genre may include as few as twenty-nine hadiths or as many as forty-eight; however, the number forty is the most common. Works in this genre cover various areas. Some seem to have no central topic, while others may be centred around themes of tassawuf (mysticism), zuhd (ascetism), or dhikr (remembrance). Others may focus on specific individuals, such as the Prophet Muhammad, the Four Caliphs (either individually or collectively), or the Companions of the Prophet. Still others may be arranged based on the chain of transmission of the hadiths collected.

Producers of forty-hadith compilations have ranged from hadith scholars and jurists to historians and literati. Collections from scholars not typically associated with hadith collection include those by the legal theorist al-Juwayni (d. 1085 CE) and Sufi theosopher Ibn Arabi (d. 1240 CE). Historically, forty hadith has been among the most popular genres of Islamic scholarship, with so many produced in manuscript and print form that "the total number of forty hadith collections might never be fully known". Efforts to compile detailed lists have been undertaken by Sahl al-Ud and Swantje Bartschat; the former identified some five hundred examples, while the latter identified more than nine hundred examples.

== History ==
Forty hadith compilations are first attested in the 8th century CE. In the tradition of hadith compilation, Abd Allah ibn al-Mubarak (d. 797 CE) is considered to have produced the first forty hadith work. Al-Mubarak wrote extensively on the concept of jihad (struggle). His forty hadith work, however, has not survived, and his identification with the genre only began with Abu Tahir al-Silafi in the 11th century CE. Works in the genre remained sparse in the 9th and 10th centuries CE, with fewer than twenty attested; the Islamicist Swantje Bartschat suggests that some of the earliest are of "false or later attribution". These earliest works generally covered a variety of themes, and did not mention earlier compilations. Early works are attested by al-Tirmidhi (d. 892 CE), Abu Bakr al-Ajurri (d. 970 CE), and al-Daraqutni (d. 995 CE).

In the 11th century CE, the forty-hadith genre gained increased popularity, with prominent examples attested from Isfahan and Baghdad. The scholar Abu Tahir al-Silafi (d. 1180 CE), who taught and studied Islam throughout the Arabian Peninsula before settling in Egypt, is identified by Bartschat as having popularized and disseminated the genre within the Muslim world while also introducing it to the West. Through the 13th century, the topics covered in forty hadith collections diversified. Production also increased, with more than sixty collections attested by the end of the century. Prominent examples include Al-Nawawi's Forty Hadith, produced by Al-Nawawi (d. 1277 CE), which has become one of the most widely-read examples of the hadith genre and received dozens of published commentaries. Another manuscript was produced by Al-Ḥasan bin Muḥammad al-Bakrī (d. 1258 CE), who collected one hadith each from forty previous collections, some of which have since been lost. Some scholars produced multiple compilations; the 15th-century scholar Al-Suyuti is attributed with 17 forty-hadith compilations, while Yusuf bin Abd al-Had is identified with 400 such compilations.

In the 16th-century, the production of forty-hadith compilations decreased; this coincided with reduced interest in the oral transmission of hadiths in the face of written canon. Despite the reduced popularity of the genre, examples continued to be produced into the 20th century. For example, Ruhollah Khomeini published a forty hadith compilation in 1940, and several publishers continue to compile their own editions. Earlier compilations of hadiths have also remained popular, with Johnathan Brown of Georgetown University describing Al-Nawawi's Forty Hadith as "one of the most widely read books after the Qur'an among Sunni Muslims".

== Works cited ==
- Bartschat, Swantje (2023). "The Prophet's Ideal in Pocket-Size". Beyond Authenticity, Alternative Approaches to Hadith Narrations and Collections. Leiden: Brill. pp. 96–132. doi:10.1163/9789004529083_005. ISBN 978-90-04-52908-3. Full access available to users of The Wikipedia Library.
- Brown, Jonathan A. C. (2009). Hadith: Muhammad's Legacy in the Medieval and Modern World. London: Oneworld Publications. ISBN 978-1-85168-696-4.
- Davidson, Garrett A. (2020). Carrying on the Tradition: A Social and Intellectual History of Hadith Transmission Across a Thousand Years. Islamic History and Civilization. Vol. 160. Leiden: Brill. doi:10.1163/9789004386938. ISBN 978-90-04-38693-8. Full access available to users of The Wikipedia Library.
- Gharaibeh, Mohammad (2025). "Ibn Rajab's Commentary on al-Nawawī's Forty Hadith: Innovation and Audience in the Jāmiʿ al-ʿulūm wa-l-ḥikam". In Blecher, Joel; Brinkmann, Stefanie (eds.). Hadith Commentary: Continuity and Change. Cambridge: Cambridge University Press. pp. 132–149. ISBN 978-1-4744-6106-1.
- Goldberg, Ori (2011). Shi'i Theology in Iran: The Challenge of Religious Experience. Oxfordshire: Taylor & Francis. ISBN 978-1-136-64904-2.
- Kandemir, M. Yaşar (2022). "Kirk Hadis" [Forty Hadiths]. İslâm Ansiklopedisi (in Turkish). Vol. 25. pp. 466–469. Archived from the original on 21 February 2026.
- Lucas, Scott (2022). "Carrying on the Tradition: A Social and Intellectual History of Hadith Transmission across a Thousand Years (By Garrett A. Davidson)". American Journal of Islam and Society. 38 (3–4): 164–170. doi:10.35632/ajis.v38i3-4.2992.
- Siddiqi, Muhammad Zubair (1993). Ḥadīth Literature: Its Origin, Development and Special Features. Cambridge: Islamic Texts Society. ISBN 978-81-87221-70-8.
