= Ibrahim Khawas =

Medieval Persian astrologer

Abu Ishaq Ibrahim bin Ahmed bin Ismail Alkhawas or Ebrahim Khawas (Persian ابراهیم الخواص) was a Persian scholar of the Sunnis in the 3rd century AH. He died in the Rey Mosque in the city of Rey, in the year 291 AH, corresponding to 904 AD, and Yusuf Ibn Al-Hussein took charge of his washing and burial. Al-Sulami said about him that he was a sheikh and scholar of his time.
