= Kashf al-Asrar =

1943 book by Ruhollah Khomeini

Kashf al-Asrar (The Unveiling of Secrets)
- Author: Ruhollah Khomeini
- Language: Persian
- Media type: Book

Kashf al-Asrar (Persian: کشف الأسرار Kashf al-Âsrâr "Unveiling of Secrets") is a book written in 1943 by Ruhollah Khomeini, the founder of the Islamic Republic of Iran, to respond to the questions and criticisms raised in a 1943 pamphlet titled The Thousand-Year Secrets (Persian: Asrar-i Hazarsala) by Ali Akbar Hakimzadeh, who had abandoned clerical studies at Qom seminary and in the mid-1930s published a modernist journal titled Humayun that advocated reformation in Islam. Kashf al-Asrar is the first book that expresses Khomeini's political views.

== Background ==
Ruhollah Khomeini wrote Kashf al-Asrar to answer questions about the credibility of Islamic and Shia beliefs that originated in a pamphlet called The Thousand-Year Secrets, which was written by Ali Akbar Hakamizada. In 1934, Hakamizada began publishing a modernist journal titled Humayun that advocated reformation in Islam and criticized Islamic superstition and traditionalism. In 1943, Hakimzada wrote The Thousand-Year Secrets which was published in Parcham, a periodical of Ahmad Kasravi. He invited Shia scholars to explain what he called the sect's superstitious beliefs.

According to Khomeini's son Ahmad, one day when his father was going to Feyziyeh School, he encountered a group of seminary students discussing this pamphlet. Khomeini was worried the views of this pamphlet had infiltrated into the seminaries, and wrote Kashf al-Asrar to answer the pamphlet's questions. Kashf al-Asrar is the first book that expresses Khomeini's political views.

== Content ==
The book defends against Hakamizada's attacks against such Shia practices as the mourning of Muharram, ziyara, the recitation of prayers composed by the Imams, clerical fostering of superstitious beliefs to perpetuate their own power, belief in the intercession of Muhammad and his descendants and the lack of any explicit mention of Imamate in the Quran. Khomeini also attacks Wahhabism and its "idolatrous" devotions, Baháʼí scholar Mírzá Abu'l-Fadl and Shia scholar Shariat Sanglaji.

Kashf al-Asrar consists of six chapters, the ordering of which mirrors the division of content in The Thousand-Year Secrets: "Tawhid", "Imamah", "The Clergy", "Government", "Law", and "Hadith". In the first chapter, "Tawhid", Khomeini answers criticisms of Shia Islam by Baháʼí Faith. The second chapter contains Hadith of Position, Hadith of the two weighty things, and proof of the concept of Imamah by verses of the Quran.

The book's third, fourth, and fifth chapters include a discussion of government in the contemporary age. At the end of The Thousand-Year Secret, Hakamizada asks some challenging questions and invites responses from readers. At the beginning of the third chapter of Kashf al-Asrar, Khomeini responds to five of the nine questions asked in The Thousand-Year Secrets.

== Reception ==
The Thousand-Year Secrets was supported by Ahmad Kasravi and Mirza Rida Quli Shari'at-Sanglaji (d. 1944), the Wahhabi-influenced Shia scholar. Along with the publication of the pamphlet, objections were raised by scholars and seminary students. According to Ayatollah Hossein Badala and Bagheri, some scholars decided to respond to it. One of the responses was written by Mehdi Al-Khalissi; Kashf al-Asrar was another answer to the pamphlet; Ruhollah Khomeini taught philosophy at that time. Qom Seminary selected Kashf al-Asrar as answers to Hakimzada's questions in The Thousand-Year Secrets.

== See also ==
- Forty Hadith of Ruhullah Khomeini
- Tahrir al-Wasilah
- Islamic Government: Governance of the Jurist
- The Greatest fight: Combat with the Self
