= Hilyat al-Awliya' =

10th-century literary work by Abu Nu'aym al-Isfahani

- Author: Abu Nu'aym al-Isfahani
- Language: Arabic
- Subject: Sufism
- Genre: Biographical dictionary and Hadith collection
- Publication date: 11th century
- Publication place: Persia

Hilyat al-Awliya' wa Tabaqat al-Asfiya' (Arabic: حلية الأولياء وطبقات الأصفياء, romanized: The Ornament of God's Friends and Generations of Pure Ones) is a biographical encyclopaedic book authored by Abu Nu'aym al-Isfahani. It provides a glance of the lives of more than 200 saints from the first three generations of Muslims (pious predecessors).

== Background ==
The author explains that he composed this work—detailing the lives of ascetics, devout worshippers, and Sufis, and transmitting their aphorisms on religious and ethical life—in order to defend them against misrepresentation and to demonstrate their innocence of the accusations levelled against them. He observes that although certain libertine or incarnationist elements (zandaqa) and unbelievers (kuffār) had infiltrated these circles, and that criticism by the exoteric scholars (ulama) of such individuals was justified, it was nevertheless erroneous to extend such censure to the virtuous ascetics and Sufis whose piety and moral integrity distinguished them from the heretical fringe.

== Content ==
The Hilyat al-Awliya' is recognized as one of the most important sources for the early development of Sufism, as it contains the largest known collection of biographies of Sufis. It consists of 689 biographies in ten volumes (approx. 4,000 pages). Abū Nuʿaym followed a roughly chronological order in Ḥilyat al-Awliyāʾ, though at times he introduced individuals earlier when he believed them to be of greater merit. The work opens with a discussion on sainthood and Sufism, followed by accounts of the first generation of Muslims, specifically the four Rightly Guided Caliphs and the ten promised Paradise. It then proceeds to include, in roughly chronological order, the first six Imams according to Shia theology, the eponymous founders of three of the four major Sunni schools of jurisprudence, as well as theologians and other pious figures celebrated for their asceticism, devotion, and mysticism. After describing the Companions known for their piety and worship, Abū Nuʿaym turns to the People of the Veranda (Ahl al-Ṣuffa) and introduces around twenty-eight women among the Companions. The ascetics of the generation of the Followers (tābiʿūn) are arranged sometimes according to their fame, and sometimes by the regions in which they lived.

The work generally omits the birth and death dates of the ascetics and Sufis, and provides little information regarding the locations in which they lived. It is composed almost entirely of transmitted reports and narratives, without any explicit authorial commentary, evaluation, or interpretation. The ornate, rhymed prose employed by Abū Nuʿaym in introducing each figure has been criticized as artificial, affected, and frequently tangential to the subject under discussion. The author systematically presents the anecdotes, sayings, and reports concerning the ascetics and Sufis along with their chains of transmission (isnāds), subsequently recording the hadiths they narrated or which were narrated from them, again with full isnāds. Given that certain hadiths—particularly those addressing asceticism and moral conduct—are not preserved in any other sources, the work is considered of considerable significance in the study of hadith. The author gets involved in sensitive subjects and refutes heresy that contradicts the tenets of the Islamic faith.

== Literary sources ==
Abū Nuʿaym derived the majority of the information in Ḥilyat al-Awliyāʾ from his teachers and contemporary scholars, while also consulting major hadith compilations, particularly those of al-Bukhārī and Muslim. He made extensive use of Abū Saʿīd Ibn al-Aʿrābī's Ṭabaqāt al-Nussāk and al-Sulamī's Ṭabaqāt al-Ṣūfiyya. In presenting the ascetics of the Followers (tābiʿūn), Abū Nuʿaym relied primarily on Ibn al-Aʿrābī, whereas for Iranian and Khurasani Sufis he drew on al-Sulamī, incorporating nearly all the information found in Ṭabaqāt al-Ṣūfiyya.

== Abridgement ==
Ibn al-Jawzi criticized the author for including the Companions of the Prophet, so then he went on to make his version of the book in two volumes entitled Sifat al-Safwa; in it, he attempts to avoid the words "Sufi" or "Tasawwuf."

== Reception ==
Abu Tahir al-Silafi said: “No work like Hilya has yet been written.”

Al-Dhahabi similarly said: “We have never written such a book as Hilyat al-Awliya'”.

It was related that Hilyat al-Awliya was among one of Imam Taqi al-Din al-Subki's favourite books.

== Editions ==
With numerous manuscript copies surviving, Ḥilyat al-Awliyāʾ has been printed twice: first in ten volumes (Cairo, 1351–1357/1932–1938), and later in twelve volumes edited by Muṣṭafā ʿAbd al-Qādir ʿAṭā (Beirut, 1418/1997).

== See also ==
- Al-Risala al-Qushayriyya
- List of Sunni books
- List of hadith books
