= The Greatest Jihad =

Book of lectures by Ruhollah Khomeini

The Greatest Jihad: Combat with the Self
- Author: Ruhollah Khomeini
- Language: English
- Genre: lectures
- Publisher: CreateSpace Independent Publishing Platform
- Publication date: 1991
- Publication place: Iran
- English publication date: December 6, 2013
- Pages: 86
- ISBN: 978-1-49435-076-5

Jihad al-Akbar (The Greatest Jihad) is a set of lectures created by Ruhollah Khomeini in Najaf, which was published in 1991 by the institute for compilation and publication of Imam Khomeini's works.

== Etymology ==
Jihad in Islam means striving way of God.(al-jihad fi sabil Allah)

In the Islamic view, jihad is two types:

1. External jihad ( physical jihad):
- Jihad (the help of God's religion) is with pen or tongue or sword.
1. Inner jihad ( spiritual or jihad al-nafs ):
- Jihad al-nafs is against all evil, anger, lust, insatiable imagination and any other bad morality in humans.

Ja'far al-Sadiq, the sixth Imam of Shiites, said: “The Muhammad dispatched a military unit to the battlefront for defense. Upon their (successful) return, he said to them "Blessed are the people who did the jihad al-Asghar" but yet jihad al-Akbar has remained. Practices of the Religion jihad al-nafs was called jihad al-Akbar and physical jihad was called jihad al-Asghar.

== Context ==
In this book, Imam Khomeini Orders to Persons and students and clerics who do Jihad al-nafs. "It is necessary that you purify yourself so that when you become a head of an institution or a community you purify them and in this way take a step to rectify and build a society". Find a good teacher and participate in ethics classes."The possibility of evil propagation and unclean hands intervening and portraying the phenomenon of having an ethical programme of rectifying one-self as unimportant eventually corrupts the hawza". In the thought of Imam Khomeini, human learns to Loss of worldly likings and self-giving to God. Imam says: People should not be proud of reaching a high position (scientific, material, political, etc).

== See also ==
- Islamic Government: Governance of the Jurist
- Tahrir al-Wasilah
- The Unveiling of Secrets
- Forty Hadith of Ruhullah Khomeini
- Kashf al-Asrar
