= The Meadows of the Righteous =

Compilation of hadith by Al-Nawawi

Riyad as-Salihin
- Author: Al-Nawawi
- Original title: رياض الصالحين
- Language: Arabic
- Genre: Subjectwise commentary from Quran and authentic Sunni Hadith

Riyad as-Salihin, The Meadows of the Righteous, or The Gardens of the Righteous (Arabic: رياض الصالحين, romanized: Riyāḍ aṣ-Ṣāliḥīn), is a collection of verses from the Quran, supplemented by Hadith narratives compiled by Al-Nawawi of Damascus. The Hadith is part of the canonical Arabic collections of Islamic morals, manners, acts of worship.

== Description ==
The Meadows of the Righteous (Gardens of the Righteous) by Al-Nawawi contains a total of 1,896 hadith divided across 372 chapters, many of which are introduced by verses of the Quran. The text studies the Hadiths to translate the teaching from Quran verses into Sunnah, or practical tradition, in the form of Islamic jurisprudence and ethics. The Sunnah which is covered by Nawawi includes the practice of Sahabah, which was viewed by Malik ibn Anas as a "living Sunnah" who transmitted the rulings directly from Muhammad.

== Sections ==
The book is organized into 20 sections, each representing a subject matter such as listed hereafter:

1. The Book of Miscellany
2. The Book of Good Manners
3. The Book of the Etiquette of Eating
4. The Book of Dress
5. The Book of the Etiquette of Sleeping, Lying and Sitting
6. The Book of Greetings
7. The Book of Visiting the Sick
8. The Book of Etiquette of Travelling
9. The Book of Virtues
10. The Book of I'tikaf
11. The Book of Hajj
12. The Book of Jihad
13. The Book of Knowledge
14. The Book of Praise and Gratitude to Allah
15. The Book of Supplicating Allah to Exalt the Mention of Allah's Messenger
16. The Book of the Remembrance of Allah
17. The Book of Du'a (Supplications)
18. The Book of the Prohibited Actions
19. The Book of Miscellaneous Ahadith of Significant Values
20. The Book of (Asking) Forgiveness

== See also ==
- Fazail-e-Amaal
- Hadith
- Kutub al-Sittah

== Appendix ==
=== Bibliography ===
- Nu'man, Farid (2020). Fiqih Praktis Sehari-hari (in Indonesian). Gema Insani. ISBN 978-6022507819.
