= Abu Bakr al-Ajurri =

Theologian, muhaddith and faqih

al-Ajurri الآجُرِّي
- Title: Imam

Personal life
- Born: Baghdad, Iraq
- Died: 970 / 360 AH Mecca, Hejaz
- Era: Islamic Golden Age (Middle Abbasid era)

Religious life
- Religion: Islam
- Denomination: Sunni
- Jurisprudence: Hanbali
- Creed: Athari
- Arabic name
- Personal (Ism): Muḥammad محمد
- Patronymic (Nasab): ibn al-Ḥusayn ibn ʿAbdallāh; بن الحسين بن عبد الله
- Teknonymic (Kunya): Abū Bakr أبو بكر
- Toponymic (Nisba): al-Ājurrī; Al-Baghdadi;

Imam al-Ajurri was an Islamic scholar from 10th century (4th century AH). He came from Darb al-Ajurr in western Baghdad, after studying with many scholar in Iraq he moved to Mecca and start teaching there. He lived in Mecca for 30 years until he died there in 970 / 320 AH. Among his teacher is Al-Hafiz Abul Muslim Ibrahim bin Abdillah bin Muslim Al-Bashri Al-Kajji (d.292 H) and also Abu Bakr Abd-allah bin Sulayman bin Al-Ash’ath As-Sijistani (d.316 H) one of sheikh in Baghdad, the son of Imam Abu Dawud of Sunan Abu Dawud. While one of his famous students is Abu Nu'aym al-Isfahani who transmitted hadith from him.

== His Writings ==
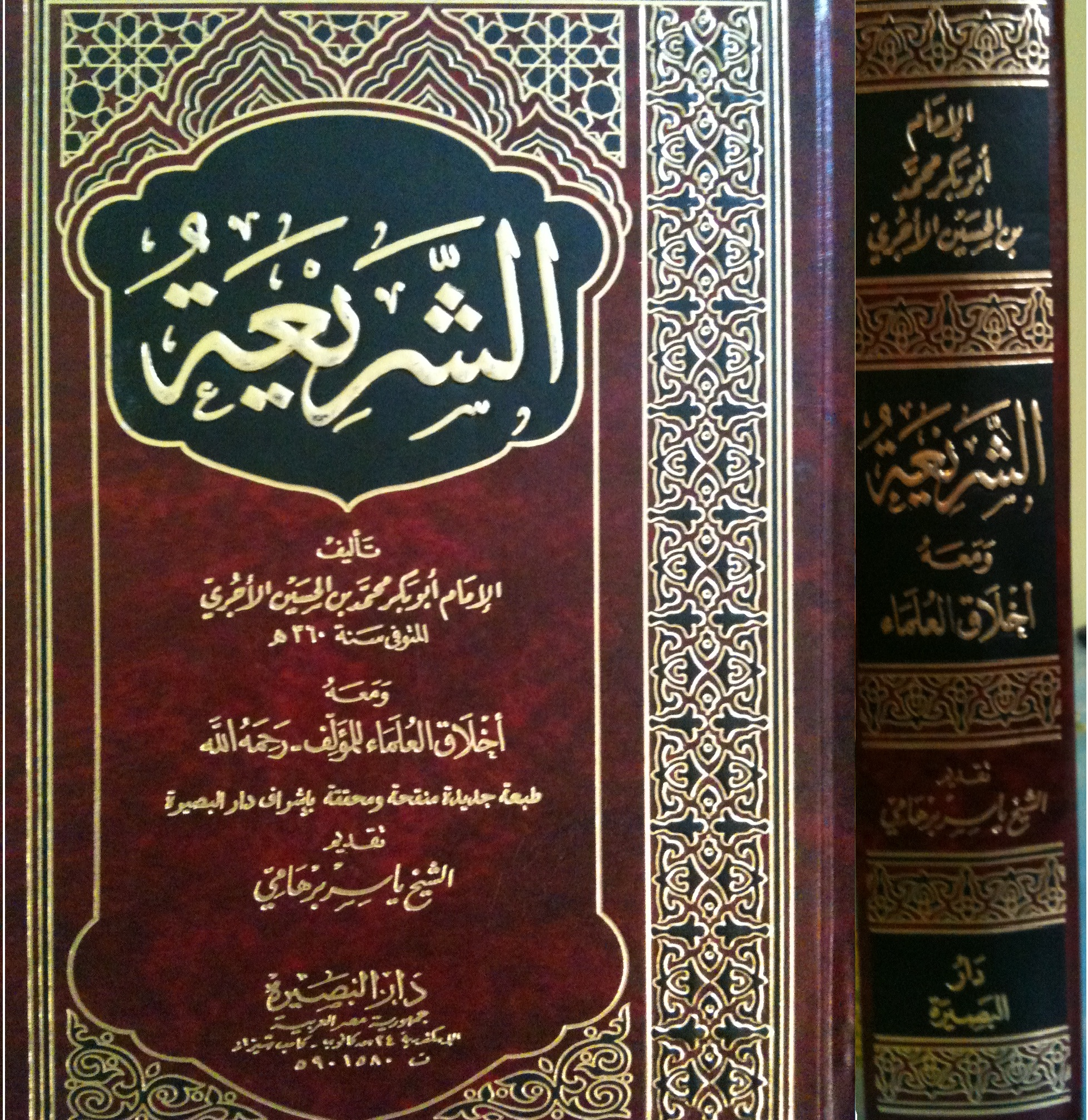
Kittab el-Sharia

Al-Ajurri wrote many books, even many of them were lost, some surviving work still published today. Some of his writing are:

- Kitāb al-Sharīʻah. 38959587 One of his important book.
- Akhlāq al-ʻulamāʼ 18820407
- Kitāb al-arbaʻīn ḥadīthan 25461361
- Akhlāq ḥamalat al-Qurʼān 22987732
- Akhlāq ahl al-Qurʼān 23483970
- Kitāb al-taṣdīq bi-al-naẓar ilá Allāh taʻālá fī al-ākhirah 23141885
- Taḥrīm al-nard wa-al-shiṭranj wa-al-malāhī 23178546
- Akhbār Abī Ḥafṣ ʻUmar ibn ʻAbd al-ʻAzīz wa-sīratuh 50195268
- Dhamm al-liwāṭ 33854700,
- Kitāb al-ghurabāʼ48871474, etc.

== Reception ==
Al-Dhahabi says:" The Imam, the Muhaddith, he was the Imam of the grand Mosque in Makkah (Imam al-Haram); a truthful, charitable and a pious man, a man of exemplary character."
