= Tahdhib al-Asma' wa-l-Lughat =

Book by An-Nawawi

Tahdhib al-Asma' wa-l-Lughat (تهذيب الأسماء واللغات)
- Author: Al-Nawawi
- Language: Arabic
- Series: Works of al-Nawawi
- Subject: Fiqh terminology and biographical dictionaries
- Publication place: Syria

Tahdhib al-Asma' wa-l-Lughat (تهذيب الأسماء واللغات) is a work on Arabic linguistic terminology, biographical dictionaries, and the terminology of Islamic jurisprudence, written by the Shafi'i scholar Al-Nawawi (631–676 AH). The work examines terminology, linguistic issues, and biographies of scholars mentioned in al-Muzani's Mukhtasar al-Muzani, al-Muhadhdhab, al-Tanbih, al-Wasit fi al-Madhhab, al-Wajiz, and Rawdat al-Talibin.

The biographical section discusses male and female figures and is arranged alphabetically.

The linguistic section is likewise arranged alphabetically. When discussing a person, al-Nawawi gives references to their position in the six major hadith collections, the number of hadiths transmitted by them when applicable, the number found in Sahih al-Bukhari and Sahih Muslim, and notable or unusual legal questions transmitted from them, particularly those relating to jurisprudence.

== Overview ==
Tahdhib al-Asma' wa-l-Lughat is a work on the terminology of Islamic jurisprudence and biographical dictionaries. It identifies names and terms occurring in the jurisprudence of Imam al-Shafi'i, including unusual names and expressions. The treatment of names follows the method of the authors of biographical dictionaries, who discuss names without restricting themselves to a particular field of scholarship. The treatment of terminology follows the method of Arabic lexicographers, who explain words according to their linguistic meanings and derivations.

== Contents ==
The work covers terminology and names occurring in Mukhtasar al-Muzani, al-Muhadhdhab, al-Tanbih, al-Wasit, al-Wajiz, and al-Rawdah. Al-Nawawi divided the work into two main sections: the first on names and the second on linguistic terminology. He further divided the section on names into two parts: men and women. The section on men is divided into eight categories.

=== Categories of the first section ===
1. Personal names, such as Muhammad, Ibrahim, Isma'il, and Ishaq.
2. Kunyas, such as Abu al-Qasim and Abu Bakr.
3. Nisbas, titles, and tribal names, such as al-Zuhri, Quraysh, and Khuzā'a.
4. Names described as the son of a particular man or woman, or as someone's brother, sister, paternal uncle, or maternal uncle.
5. Persons described through a chain such as "so-and-so, from his father, from his grandfather."
6. Persons described as the husband of a particular woman or the wife of a particular man.
7. Ambiguous figures (mubhamat), such as "a man," "a shaykh," "some scholars," and similar expressions.
8. Errors occurring in names and genealogical attributions.

=== Categories of the second section ===
The second section concerns women and consists of seven categories. It follows the same arrangement as the section on men, except for the fifth category, since the works on which the book is based do not contain examples of women described through a chain such as "so-and-so, from her mother, from her grandmother," or "from her father, from her grandfather."

=== Arrangement of names ===
Al-Nawawi arranged the names according to the Arabic alphabet. He began with individuals named Muhammad, stating that he did so "following Abu Abd Allah al-Bukhari and the scholars after him, may Allah be pleased with them, because of the nobility of the name of the Prophet Muhammad." He then returned to the conventional alphabetical order.

Within each letter, he also followed a secondary alphabetical order. For example, under the letter hamza, he placed Adam before Ibrahim because, although both names begin with hamza, the second letter of Adam is another hamza, whereas the second letter of Ibrahim is ba, and hamza precedes ba in the alphabetical order.

For ambiguous figures and errors, he stated that he arranged them according to the order in which they occur in the books upon which the work was based.

== Linguistic terminology ==
Al-Nawawi arranged the linguistic terminology alphabetically. Within each letter, he considered the first, second, and subsequent letters, arranging words according to their original letters rather than their additional letters. In some cases, he included an additional letter in the entry under the form in which it occurs and explicitly noted that the letter was additional.

== Vocalization of names and terminology ==
Al-Nawawi provided precise vocalization for personal names, linguistic terms, place names, and other words requiring clarification. He indicated matters such as whether a consonant is pronounced lightly or emphatically, whether it is doubled, and whether a letter is the unpointed ayn or the dotted ghayn, and similar distinctions.

He stated that he would transmit this material after verifying and refining it from authoritative sources and the works of scholars specializing in the subject. When information was well known, he generally did not attribute it to individual authorities because of the large number of transmitters and the lack of need to do so. When discussing Arabic linguistic material, however, he attributed it to its author or transmitter.

For personal names and biographical information, he relied on works by renowned hadith scholars and historians whose authority was widely recognized, including the Tarikh of al-Bukhari, the work of Ibn Abi Khaythama, the Tarikh of Khalifa ibn Khayyat, the Kitab al-Tabaqat al-Kabir and al-Tabaqat al-Saghir of Ibn Sa'd, al-Waqidi, and others.

== The terminology of Islamic jurisprudence ==
Al-Nawawi explained the purpose of his work in the introduction to his al-Majmu:

I explain therein the linguistic expressions occurring in the book, and the names of the companions [of the school] and others among the scholars, transmitters, and narrators, sometimes at length and sometimes briefly according to the context and need. For this purpose I compiled a work called Tahdhib al-Asma' wa-l-Lughat, in which I collected material relating to Mukhtasar al-Muzani, al-Muhadhdhab, al-Wasit, al-Tanbih, al-Wajiz, and al-Rawdah, which I abridged from the commentary on al-Wajiz by Imam Abu al-Qasim al-Rafi'i, may Allah have mercy on him. It includes Arabic and foreign words, names, definitions, qualifications, principles, rules, and other matters mentioned in any of these six books. I also explain therein a number of matters for which Imam Abu Ibrahim Isma'il ibn Yahya al-Muzani was criticized in his Mukhtasar, Imam Abu Hamid al-Ghazali in al-Wasit, and the author of al-Tanbih, together with responses to those criticisms where possible, since the need for this is comparable to the need for al-Muhadhdhab.

— Al-Nawawi, introduction to al-Majmu
