= Tahrir al-Wasilah =

Book by Ruhollah Khomeini

Tahrir Al-Wasilah (Clarification of the Means of Salvation)
- Author: Ruhollah Khomeini
- Language: Arabic; translated into English
- Subject: Islamic ethics
- Publisher: Institute for Compilation and Publication of Imam Khomeini’s Works
- Publication date: 2001
- Publication place: Iran
- Pages: 708 pages
- ISBN: 978-1496120663

Tahrir al-Wasilah (Arabic: تحرير الوسيلة; Clarification of the Means of Salvation; in Persian: تحریر الوسیله Tahrir al-Vasileh) is a book by Ayatollah Khomeini written as a commentary.

The book was part of the centuries-old tradition of commentaries on Islamic jurisprudence (fiqh) commonly written by leading Shia clerics working toward the status of Marja, for the use of their students and fellow clerics. The "Means" or "Intercession" this book was commenting on was Wasileh un-Nejat, (The Means of Salvation), by S. Abul-Hasan Isfahani. Khomeini's commentary covered socio-political issues such as jihad and "ordering the good and forbidding the evil", that had been abandoned by his contemporaries.

Written during Khomeini's exile, the book was started in 1964 in Turkey and finished in Iraq and comes in two volumes and four editions. The book has been called "substantial" and responsible for securing Khomeini's "reputation in the early 1960s", and raising his "status as a jurist". The book later became the subject of commentaries itself.

== Title ==
The book is known as Tahrirolvasyleh in Persian. It has been published under the title Kitab al-Fiqh, and the website of Ayatollah Muhammad Fazel Lankarani has listed the book under the title Tafsil-al-Shariah.

Image cover of the Persian version of the book

== Content ==
Following the traditional form, the book is made up of responses or fatwas "either presented in the form of answers to concrete questions relating to the ritual or material life of believers, or as methodical exercises whose purpose is to formulate possible answers to speculative questions."

The book lists 4,400 problems, most of which are on personal religious issues such as ritual purity, prayer, fasting, pilgrimage, charitable giving. Slightly more than 1,000 of the questions concern public law directly or indirectly.

- 18.2% of the questions deal with regulations pertaining to ritual purity and prayer (salat).
- 16% of the (questions and) solutions "deal with questions about Islamic taxes (Khums, zakat and taxes relating to waqf foundations)." (These, combined with ritual purity and prayer, traditionally come under the heading of worship ('ebadat)).
- 14.1% are concerned with the Hudud (punishments for theft, fornication and adultery (zina), consumption of alcohol, and apostasy)
- About 1%, (51 questions), deal with defense (defa')
- Almost 3% (129 questions), deal with enjoining the good and forbidding the evil.
- About 1%, (44 questions) deal with the adherents of "religions of the Book" (ahl-e zemmeh or Dhimmi)
- 2.3% (105 questions), with new occurrences (mostahdasat)
- 25.3% (1,116) of the questions are directly or indirectly connected with public laws. Including khoms tax, enjoining the good and forbidding the evil, defense and relations with Christians and Jews.

Author Baqer Moin noted Khomeini dealt with the question of Islamic government, stating that the Imam, or leader of the Muslim community, has the right to fix prices and otherwise regulate commerce if he feels it is "in the interest of Islamic society". He also dealt with the issue of foreign policy and the necessity of preventing "the Muslim community from falling under the influence of foreigners".

At least as of April 2013 a text of the book (or much of it) translated into English and organized with an index divided the book into 120 or so links can be found online. The book is divided into 20 sections, each which may have between one and thirty links depending on its length. Excerpts from the book translated into English can also be found in the book A Clarification of Questions: an Unabridged Translation of Resaleh Towzih al-Masael by Ayatollah Sayyed Ruhollah Mousavi Khomeini, Translated by J. Borujerdi, with a Foreword by Michael M. J. Fischer and Mehdi Abedi, Westview Press/ Boulder and London, c1984.

The most extensive and complete version appears to be that of the Iranian Institute for Compilation and Publication of Imam Khomeini’s Works. This English/Arabic edition (2001) is divided into 4 volumes, totaling approximately 2500 pages, and the translation to English language was carried out by Dr. Ali Reza Naqavi, former professor of Shia jurisprudence at the International Islamic University in Islamabad, Pakistan. The work was available for some time on the Internet Archive, but no longer.

=== "New occurrences" ===
According to author Asghar Schirazi, Khomeini attempted to update shari’ah law in his Tahrir al-Vasileh with 105 legal rulings (fatawa) for the modern world on mostahdasat or "new occurrences": 10 on insurance, 6 on foreign exchange bureaux, 8 on paying indemnity, 12 on banks, 7 on lotteries, 10 on artificial insemination, 7 on autopsy and organ transplantation, 10 on sex change, 11 on radio, television, etc., 18 on prayer and fasting in aeroplane or at the earth's poles, and 6 on outer space.

=== Apostasy ===
Khomeini deals with the different kinds of apostates from Islam (innate-apostate and national apostates), the appropriate punishment for leaving Islam (death for men, imprisonment for women). What constitutes evidence (the witnessing of two just men and by confession). Children of apostates may be considered apostates themselves, even if they never accepted Islam because: "The child of a Moslem or that of an apostate, whether national or innate, is considered Moslem before the father's apostasy, and therefore, if the child reached puberty and chose infidelity he will be asked to repent (and to return to Islam), else he will be executed."

=== "Blood money" ===
"Blood money", (Diyya) — the amount paid in compensation to the family of a murder victim — varies according to the religion and gender of the victim.

- The fine for the premeditated killing of a Muslim man should be "10,000 derhams, 1,000 dinars, or 100 camels";
- 8,000 derhams, 800 dinars, or 80 camels for a non-Muslim man (known as a "tributary," i.e. a Jew, Christian, or Zoroastrians who pays tribute to the Muslim government and "lives under the protection of Islam,");
- 5,000 derhams, 500 dinars, etc. for killing a Muslim woman; and
- 4,000 derhams, etc. for a non-Muslim woman.

=== Restrictions on non-Muslims ===
Approximately 1% of the questions in Tahrir—44 fatawa—are on "adherents of religions of the Book" (ahl-e zemmeh) according to Asghar Schirazi, in The Constitution of Iran.

Tahrir al-Vasileh states that if followers of the Jewish, Christianity and Zoroastrian religions "undertake and guarantee the conditions of tribute", "their religions will be recognized and an amount of poll tax (Jizyah) will be accepted from them". The "poll tax" on these non-Muslims is not necessarily a tax per individual, but depends on the "expediencies of time and place and the situation at hand,” and may be a tax on people, land, income, "beasts of burden and trees and real estate", set at whatever rate the Muslim government finds appropriate.

Tahrir al-Vasileh also lists 15 "Tributary Conditions”—non-financial regulations on non-Muslims—these include some outside the bounds of equal rights for minorities:

- (#6) "They must not establish synagogues or ring church bells.”
- (#10) "Any building erected by the Tributary People must not stand higher than those of its neighboring Moslems.”
- (#15) "Infidels, whether tributary or non-tributary, do not have the right to promote their religions and publish their books in Islamic countries, or to invite the Moslems and Moslem children to their religions ...”

=== Music ===
Ghena (a kind of music) is forbidden.

Performing and listening to singing (ghena'), as well as making money from it, are forbidden. Ghena' means not only making one's voice attractive, but also includes the drawing out and varying of the voice in a way that induces merriment and which is suited to gatherings for the purpose of amusement and having fun. And it also includes musical instruments. It makes no difference whether it is used to accompany the holy word such as the Koran or prayer or as a dirge or to accompany prose or poetry. Indeed, the penance is doubled when it is used to accompany the holy word such as the Koran or prayer or as a dirge or to accompany prose or poetry. Indeed, the penance is doubled when it is used in connection with worshipping the sublime God.

== Influence ==
When the Ministry of Justice declared sex reassignment surgery to be legal in 1987, it did so based completely on Tahrir al-Wasilah rather than on any law. Khomeini's ruling on the subject appears under a subsection titled "The Changing of Sex" within the section on "The Examination of Contemporary Questions (al-masa’il al-mustahdithah)".

== Controversies ==
While Tahrir al-Wassilah has been called "substantial" and responsible for raising Khomeini's "status as a jurist", one critic alleges the book was actually of poor quality. Amir Taheri claims the "book's Arabic was so ungrammatical and peppered with Persian words no Arab would understand that it had to be almost entirely rewritten by a group of Lebanese Shi'ite before its eventual publication in Tehran in 1984."

Another criticism is that as Khomeini's major work on Islamic law, the book's contents belie the author's later claims for the potential of government based purely on Sharia — Islamic law. Namely that:

The entire system of government and administration, together with necessary laws, lies ready for you. If the administration of the country calls for taxes, Islam has made the necessary provision; and if laws are needed, Islam has established them all. There is no need for you, after establishing a government, to sit down and draw up laws, or, like rulers who worship foreigners and are infatuated with the west, run after others to borrow their laws. Everything is ready and waiting.

According to author Asghar Schirazi, even when the Khomeini attempts to update fiqh with a section on "new occurrences", "the solutions offered would be too primitive and meager to meet the needs of a 20th-century society." According to the fatawa of Tahrir al-Wassilah,

Listening to the radio or watching television is frequently forbidden or only allowed provided it does not contradict the shari’a. The use of exchange bureaux or banks is only permitted if interest is renounced. Lotteries are forbidden, artificial insemination is only allowed if the sperm donor is the husband of the female recipient. It is forbidden to carry out an autopsy on the corpse of a Muslim, and so on. Interestingly, many of these reservations and prohibitions have been dropped in the Islamic Republic."

The fatawa on modern activities like banking and insurance policies have nothing to say about their proper functioning. They only deal with whether or when the activities violate Islam law; nothing on issues such as the minimum reserve requirements to make sure withdrawals can be paid if there is a run on a bank, or regulations to guarantee the solvency of an insurer.

Another point of controversy was Khomeini's suggestions to his followers in Part 3, Problem 12, where he mentions that men can marry and have sexual pleasure with females under the age of nine (including infants) as long as there is no vaginal penetration:

Intercourse with a woman is not allowed unless she attains the age of nine years regardless whether the marriage is permanent or temporary. There is, however, no objection in other enjoyments like touching lasciviously, hugging and rubbing the thighs, even with a suckling infant.

Khomeini's supportes believe that the passage in Tahrir al-Wassilah should be viewed as part of a systematic legal exercise rather than a social recommendation. They argue that a fiqh manual aims to explore and classify the formal outcomes of legal rulings even in situations that aren't meant to serve as practical guidance. This approach, known as fard-e nazari (theoretical hypothesis), allows for the definition of a rule's scope without assuming the examined case is typical, desirable, or even realistic.

To highlight this classificatory role, these defenders point out that jurisprudential works often tackle extreme or nearly impossible scenarios, like a person with six heads, to see how legal categories would apply. In their view, including a hypothetical case in a manual shows the depth of legal analysis, not an endorsement of that case. They apply the same reasoning to the passage at hand: it's an exploration of the consequences outlined by the legal system, not a directive for society.

== See also ==
- Islamic jurisprudence
- Exposition of Forty Hadith
- The Unveiling of Secrets
- The Greatest fight: Combat with the Self

== Bibliography ==
- Khomeini, Ruhollah (2001). Tahrir al-Wasilah (4 volumes). Translated by Reza Naqavi, Ali. Institute for Compilation and Publication of Imam Khomeini’s Works.
