= Al-Nawawi's Forty Hadith =

Book by An-Nawawi

Nawawi's Forty (sc. “Forty Hadith”, in Arabic: al-arbaʿīn al-nawawiyyah) is a compilation of forty-two hadiths by Imam al-Nawawi, most of which are from Sahih Muslim and Sahih al-Bukhari. This collection of hadith has been particularly valued over the centuries because it is a distillation, by one of the most eminent and revered authorities in Islamic jurisprudence, of the foundations of Islamic sacred law or Sharīʿah. In putting together this collection, it was the author's explicit aim that “each hadith is a great fundament (qāʿida ʿaẓīma) of the religion, described by the religious scholars as being ‘the axis of Islam’ or ‘the half of Islam’ or ‘the third of it’ or the like, and to make it a rule that these forty hadith be classified as sound (ṣaḥīḥ).” This work is the most representative of the arbaʿīniyyāt genre of hadith.

== See also ==
- Forty hadith
