= Al-Nawawi =

Syrian Sunni Shafi'ite jurist and hadith scholar (1233–1277)

Yaḥyā ibn Sharaf al-Nawawī
- Title: Shaykh ul-Islam; Qutb al-Awliya' al-Shaykhayn; Al-Ḥāfiẓ

Personal life
- Born: Muharram 631 AH / October 1233 Nawa, Ayyubid Sultanate
- Died: 24 Rajab 676 AH / 21 December 1277 (age 45) Nawa, Mamluk Sultanate
- Resting place: Nawa, present-day Syria
- Main interest(s): Fiqh, Usul, Hadith, Mantiq
- Occupation: Historiographer, bibliographer, scholar, jurist.

Religious life
- Religion: Islam
- Denomination: Sunni
- School: Shafi'i
- Creed: Ash'ari

Muslim leader
- Influenced by: Al-Shafi'i Abu al-Hasan al-Ash'ari Al-Ghazali Ibn Asakir Abu al-Qasim al-Rafi'i
- Arabic name
- Personal (Ism): Yaḥyā يَحْيَىٰ
- Patronymic (Nasab): Ibn Sharaf ibn Murī ibn Ḥasan ibn Ḥusayn ibn Muḥammad ibn Jumʿa ibn Hizam ٱبْن شَرَف ٱبْن مُرِيّ ٱبْن حَسَن ٱبْن حُسَيْن ٱبْن مُحَمَّد ٱبْن جُمْعَة ٱبْن حِزَام
- Teknonymic (Kunya): Abū Zakariyyā أَبُو زَكَرِيَّا
- Toponymic (Nisba): Al-Nawawī ٱلنَّوَوِيّ

Yahya ibn Sharaf al-Nawawi (Arabic: يحيى بن شرف النووي, romanized: Yaḥyā ibn Sharaf al-Nawawī) (October 1233 – 21 December 1277) was a jurist and hadith scholar, better known for authoring The Meadows of the Righteous and Sharh Sahih Muslim. Despite dying at the relatively early age of 45, Al-Nawawi authored numerous and lengthy works ranging from hadith, to theology, biography, and jurisprudence that are still read to this day. Al-Nawawi, along with Abu al-Qasim al-Rafi'i, are leading jurists of the earlier classical age, known by the Shafi'i school as the Two Shaykhs (al-Shaykhayn).

== Early life ==
He was born at Nawa near Daraa, Syria. As with Arabic and other Semitic languages, the last part of his name refers to his hometown.

Yasin bin Yusuf Marakashi, says: "I saw Imam Nawawi at Nawa when he was a youth of ten years of age. Other boys of his age used to force him to play with them, but Imam Nawawi would always avoid the play and would remain busy with the recitation of the Noble Qur'an. When they tried to domineer and insisted on his joining their games, he bewailed and expressed his no concern over their foolish action. On observing his sagacity and profundity, a special love and affection developed in my heart for young Nawawi. I approached his teacher and urged him to take exceptional care of this lad as he was to become a great religious scholar. His teacher asked whether I was a soothsayer or an astrologer. I told him I am neither soothsayer nor an astrologer but Allah caused me to utter these words." His teacher conveyed this incident to Imam's father and in keeping in view the learning quest of his son, decided to dedicate the life of his son for the service and promotion of the cause of Islam.

Al-Subki records in his Ṭabaqāt al-Shāfiʿiyya al-Kubrā that al-Nawawi's father reported a remarkable sign of his son's early spiritual distinction. When al-Nawawi was seven years old, on the twenty-seventh night of Ramadan, he awoke in the middle of the night and roused his father, asking: "O my father, what is this light that has filled the house?" The entire family awoke but none of them saw anything. His father concluded that the night must have been Laylat al-Qadr, the Night of Power.

== Life as a scholar ==
He studied in Damascus from the age of 18 and after making the pilgrimage in 1253, he settled there as a private scholar.

In 665 AH (1267 CE), al-Nawawi was appointed head (shaykh) of the Ashrafiyya Dār al-Ḥadīth in Damascus, one of the most prestigious hadith institutions in the Islamic world, a post he held until his death. Al-Subki noted that "no one entered [the Dār al-Ḥadīth] more pious than al-Nawawi."

Al-Nawawi was renowned for his extreme asceticism. He ate only one meal a day, after the late evening prayer (ʿishāʾ), paid no attention to his clothing or personal comforts, and had no interest in worldly pleasures. He never married, believing it would distract him from scholarship and worship. Al-Dhahabi described him as "the master of the hadith scholars" and noted that he devoted all his time to learning, writing, and teaching.

=== Notable teachers ===
During his stay at Damascus, he studied from more than twenty teachers who were regarded as masters and authority of their subject field and disciplines they taught. An-Nawawi studied Hadith, Islamic Jurisprudence, its principles, syntax and Etymology. His teachers included:

- Abu Ibrahim Ishaq bin Ahmad AI-Maghribi
- Abu Muhammad Abdur-Rahman bin Ibrahim Al-Fazari
- Radiyuddin Abu Ishaq Ibrahim bin Abu Hafs Umar bin Mudar Al-Mudari
- Abu Ishaq Ibrahim bin Isa Al-Muradi
- Abul-Baqa Khalid bin Yusuf An-Nablusi
- Abul-Abbas Ahmad bin Salim Al-Misri
- Abu Abdullah Al-Jiyani
- Abul-Fath Umar bin Bandar
- Abu Muhammad At-Tanukhi
- Sharafuddin Abdul-Aziz bin Muhammad Al-Ansari
- Abul-Faraj Abdur-Rahman bin Muhammad bin Ahmad Al-Maqdisi
- Abul-Fada'il Sallar bin Al-Hasan Al Arbali

== Creed ==
He did ta'wil on some of the Qur'an verses and ahadith on the attributes of Allah. He states in his commentary of a hadith that:

This is one of the "hadiths of the attributes," about which scholars have two positions. The first is to have faith in it without discussing its meaning, while believing of Allah Most High that "there is nothing whatsoever like unto Him" (Qur'an 42:11), and that He is exalted above having any of the attributes of His creatures. The second is to figuratively explain it in a fitting way, scholars who hold this position adducing that the point of the hadith was to test the slave girl: Was she a monotheist, who affirmed that the Creator, the Disposer, the Doer, is Allah alone and that He is the one called upon when a person making supplication (du'a) faces the sky--just as those performing the prayer (salat) face the Kaaba, since the sky is the qibla of those who supplicate, as the Kaaba is the qibla of those who perform the prayer--or was she a worshipper of the idols which they placed in front of themselves? So when she said, In the sky, it was plain that she was not an idol worshiper.

== Relationship with Baybars ==
Al-Nawawi drew the ire of Mamluk Sultan Rukn al-Din Baybars twice. Once, at a time when the people of Damascus sought relief from a heavy tax burden after a years-long drought, Al-Nawawi wrote that if Baybars did not stop taxing its residents abusively then Allah will tax his misdeed in the afterlife. This prompted Baybars to threaten to expel him from Damascus. To this, he responded:

"As for myself, threats do not harm me or mean anything to me. They will not keep me from advising the ruler, for I believe that this is obligatory upon me and others."

According to a popular tale, Al-Nawawi addressed Sultan Baybars when the latter wanted the ulama to issue a fatwa that decreed that the waqf be collected solely for the ruler, despite originally being meant for the people. Al-Nawawi in response scolded him, urging him to fear Allah and rein in his greed, which the Sultan accepted. Some people asked Baybars why he did not imprison Al-Nawawi in retaliation, to which Baybars replied that whenever he thought of locking up Al-Nawawi, a fear flowed through his heart. In both encounters, Baybars abided by Al-Nawawi's counsel.

== Death and legacy ==
Al-Nawawi died on 21 December 1277 AD (5 Rajab 676 AH) at the relatively young age of 45. He was buried the next morning.

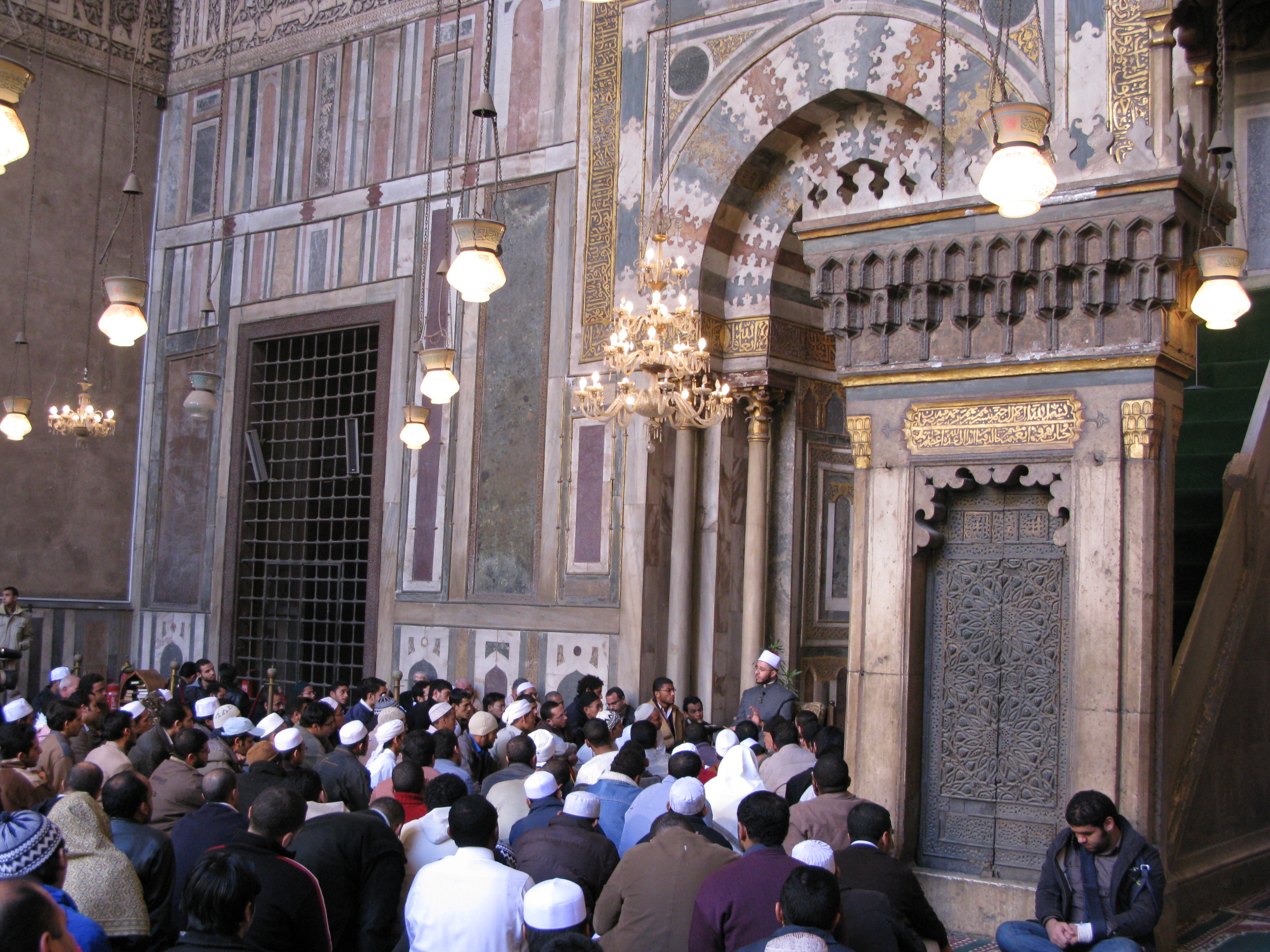
Imam Nawawi's Forty Hadith taught in the Mosque-Madrassa of Sultan Hassan in Cairo, Egypt

An-Nawawi's lasting legacy is his contribution to hadith literature through his momentous works Forty Hadiths and Riyadh as-Saaliheen. This made him respected in all madhabs, despite him being of Shafi'i jurisprudence. According to Al-Dhahabi, Imam Nawawi's concentration and absorption in academic love gained proverbial fame. He had devoted all his time for learning and scholarship. Other than reading and writing, he spent his time contemplating on the interacted and complex issues and in finding their solutions. Ulama's praise him for 3 characteristics:

1. His level of scholarship. Writing more than 40 pages daily from age 18-45. Studying continuously for 12 hours and then teaching for another 12 hours at age 18-20 in Damascus.
2. His asceticism. Not marrying in fear of faltering his wife's right, lack of love for dunya, constant worshipping of Allah, constant zikr.
3. His keenness in enjoining good and forbidding evil. As done with Sultan al-Baybars.

=== Destruction of tomb ===
In 2015, during the Syrian Civil War, his tomb was demolished by Syrian rebels belonging to Al Nusra.

== Works ==
During his life of 45 years he wrote "at least fifty books" on Islamic studies and other topics. Some scholar counted pages he written and calculated that he wrote 40+ pages daily from age 18 till his death. Some his writings is still reached vastly as no author has superseded him in those writing. These include:

- Al Minhaj bi Sharh Sahih Muslim (شرح صحيح مسلم), making use of others before him, and is considered one of the best commentaries on Sahih Muslim. It is available online.
- Riyadh as-Saaliheen (رياض الصالحين); collection of hadith on ethics, manners, conduct, popular in the Muslim world.
- al-Majmu' sharh al-Muhadhab (المجموع شرح المهذب), is a comprehensive manual of Islamic law according to the Shafi'i school has been edited with French translation by van den Bergh, 2 vols., Batavia (1882–1884), and published at Cairo (1888).
- Minhaj al-Talibin (منهاج الطالبين وعمدة المفتين في فقه الإمام الشافعي), a classical manual on Islamic Law according to Shafi'i fiqh.
- Tahdhib al-Asma' wa-l-Lughat (تهذيب الأسماء), edited as the Biographical Dictionary of Illustrious Men chiefly at the Beginning of Islam (Arabic) by F. Wüstenfeld (Göttingen, 1842–1847).
- Taqrib al-Taisir (التقريب والتيسير لمعرفة سنن البشير النذير), an introduction to the study of hadith, it is an extension of Ibn al-Salah's Muqaddimah, was published at Cairo, 1890, with Suyuti's commentary "Tadrib al-Rawi". It has been in part translated into French by W. Marçais in the Journal asiatique, series ix., vols. 16–18 (1900–1901).
- al-Arbaʿīn al-Nawawiyya (الأربعون النووية) - 'Forty Hadiths,' collection of forty-two fundamental traditions, frequently published along with numerous commentaries.
- Ma Tamas ilayhi hajat al-Qari li Saheeh al-Bukhaari (ما تمس إليه حاجة القاري لصـحيح البـخاري)
- Tahrir al-Tanbih (تحرير التنبيه)
- Kitab al-Adhkar (الأذكار المنتخبة من كلام سيد الأبرار); collection of supplications of Muhammad.
- al-Tibyan fi adab Hamalat al-Quran (التبيان في آداب حملة القرآن)
- Adab al-fatwa wa al-Mufti wa al-Mustafti (آداب الفتوى والمفتي والمستفتي)
- al-Tarkhis fi al-Qiyam (الترخيص بالقيام لذوي الفضل والمزية من أهل الإسلام)
- Manasik (متن الإيضاح في المناسك) on Hajj rituals.
- al-Hatt ala al-Mantiq (الحت على المنطق) - 'The Insistence upon Logic,' written to address epistemological and historical criticisms of logic
- Sharh Sunan Abu Dawood
- Sharh Sahih al-Bukhari
- Mukhtasar at-Tirmidhi
- Tabaqat ash-Shafi'iyah
- Rawdhat al-Talibeen
- Bustan al-`arifin
- Al-Maqasid

== Recent English language editions ==
- Bustan al-ʿarifin (The Garden of Gnostics), Translated by Aisha Bewley

=== Minhaj al-Talibin ===
- Minhaj et talibin: A Manual of Muhammadan Law; According To The School of Shafi, Law Publishing Co (1977) ASIN B0006D2W9I
- Minhaj et talibin: A Manual of Muhammadan Law; According To The School of Shafi, Navrang (1992) ISBN 81-7013-097-2
- Minhaj Et Talibin: A Manual of Muhammadan Law, Adam Publishers (2005) ISBN 81-7435-249-X

=== The Forty Hadith ===
- Al-Nawawi Forty Hadiths and Commentary; Translated by Arabic Virtual Translation Center; (2010) ISBN 978-1-4563-6735-0
- Ibn-Daqiq's Commentary on the Nawawi Forty Hadiths; Translated by Arabic Virtual Translation Center; (2011) ISBN 1-4565-8325-5
- The Compendium of Knowledge and Wisdom; Translation of Jami' Uloom wal-Hikam by Ibn Rajab al-Hanbali translated by Abdassamad Clarke, Turath Publishing (2007) ISBN 0-9547380-2-0
- Al-Nawawi's Forty Hadith, Translated by Ezzeddin Ibrahim, Islamic Texts Society; New edition (1997) ISBN 0-946621-65-9
- The Forty Hadith of al-Imam al-Nawawi, Abul-Qasim Publishing House (1999) ISBN 9960-792-76-5
- The Complete Forty Hadith, Ta-Ha Publishers (2000) ISBN 1-84200-013-6
- The Arba'een 40 Ahadith of Imam Nawawi with Commentary, Darul Ishaat
- Commentary on the Forty Hadith of Al-Nawawi (3 Vols.), by Jamaal Al-Din M. Zarabozo, Al-Basheer (1999) ISBN 1-891540-04-1

=== Riyad al-Salihin ===
- Gardens of the righteous: Riyadh as-Salihin of Imam Nawawi, Rowman and Littlefield (1975) ISBN 0-87471-650-0
- Riyad-us-Salihin: Garden of the Righteous, Dar Al-Kotob Al-Ilmiyah
- Riyadh-us-Saliheen (Vol. 1&2 in One Book) (Arabic-English) Dar Ahya Us-Sunnah Al Nabawiya

== See also ==
- Forty hadith
- Islamic scholars
- Imam Shafi'i
