= Feyziyeh School =

National monument in Qom, Iran

Coordinates: 34.6427816°N 50.8792969°E

Feyziyeh School مدرسه فیضیه
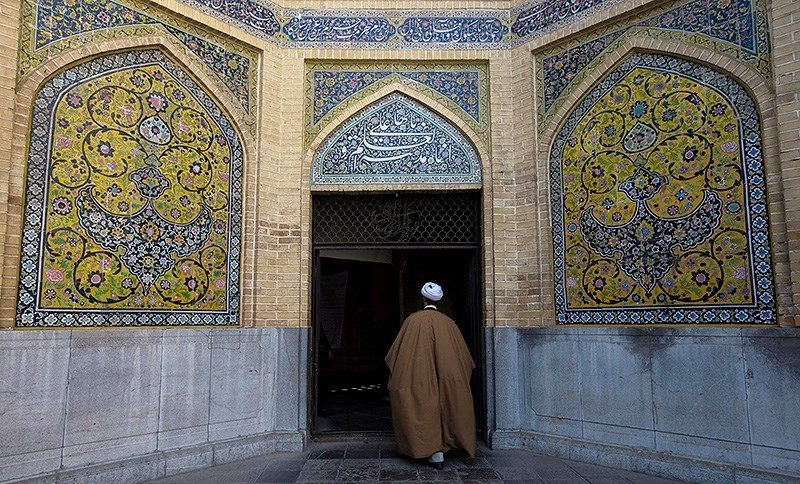

Religion
- Affiliation: Islam

Location
- Location: Qom, Iran
- Interactive map of Feyziyeh School مدرسه فیضیه

Architecture
- Type: School
- Style: Iranian
- Completed: 1792

Feyziyeh School (Persian: مدرسه فیضیه) is an old school in Qom, Iran that was founded in the Safavid era. The school has been listed as one of Iran's national monuments as of 29 January 2008. The school is famous in part as the focal point for clerical opposition to Mohammad Reza Shah Pahlavi's White Revolution, and the site of the 1963 Ashura speech by Ayatollah Ruhollah Khomeini denouncing the Shah, which led to his arrest.

== Background ==
The Feyziyeh school was founded in Qom during the Safavid era. An epigraph on the south veranda dates its construction to the reign of Shah Tahmasp. A school by the name of Astana existed at the site, from the 6th to the 11th century. Reconstruction was carried out under the Safavids and the school was renamed Feyziyeh. The school was rebuilt and extended during the reign of Fath-Ali Shah Qajar in 1799. The school has 40 rooms on the first floor, 4 long veranda, 12 stalls and a square pool.

== History ==
=== Opposition to the White Revolution ===
In 1963, Mohammad Reza Shah announced a program of reforms he labeled the White Revolution. Members of the Iranian clergy were angered by proposed land reforms and protested against these changes. The Shah traveled to Qom and, during a speech, announced the clergy black reactionaries worse than the red reactionaries and a hundred times more treacherous than the (communist) Tudeh party. On 26 January 1963 and despite a boycott by the opposition, a referendum was held to legitimise the White Revolution in which 5,598,711 people voted for, and 4,115 against, the reforms. The referendum was a good excuse for the government to take tougher practical action against the clergy and on 22 March 1963, coinciding with the death day of Ja'far al-Sadiq, the Shah's guards attacked Feyziyeh School and killed students and people. According to Daniel Brumberg, the regime persuaded the thugs to attack the students of Feyziyeh School. In response Ayatollah Ruhollah Khomeini announced the new year of 1963 as a day of public mourning.

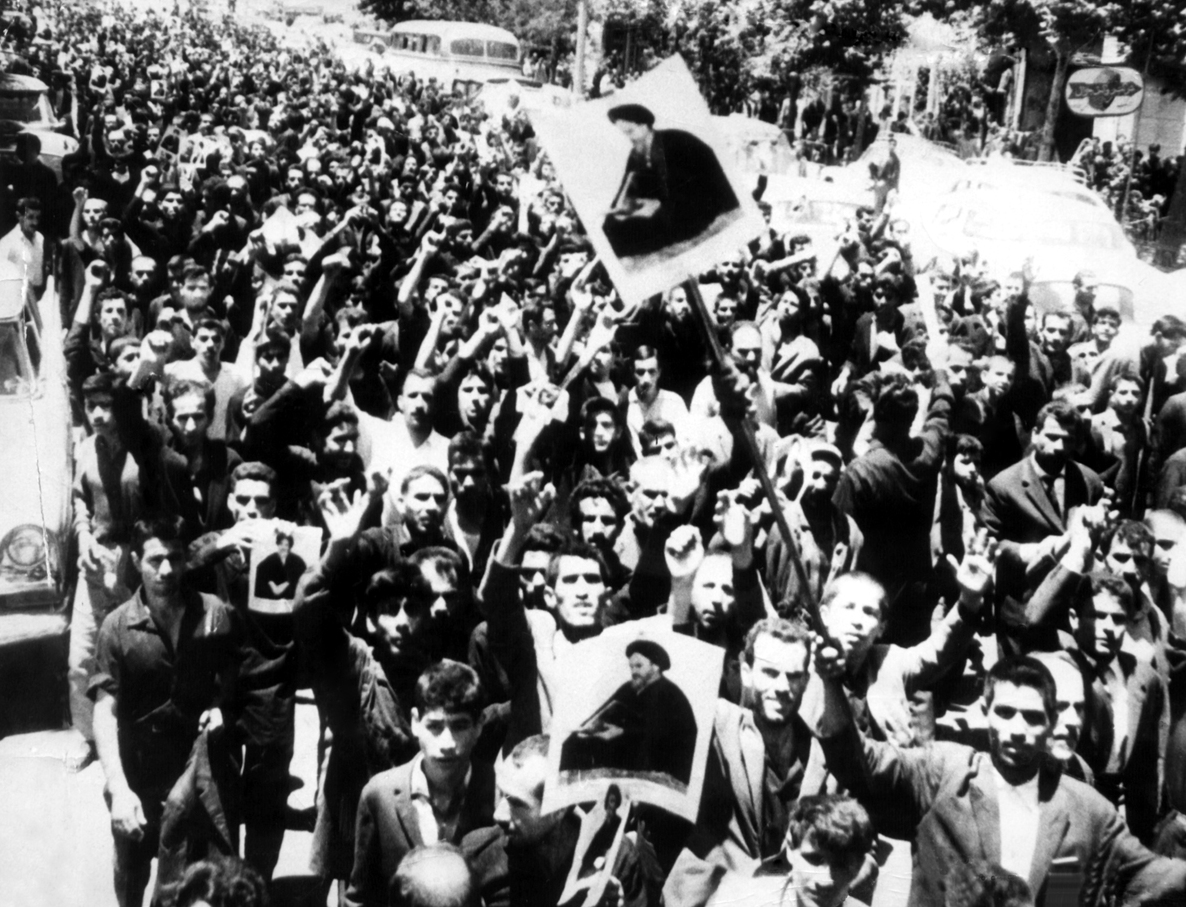
The demonstrations of 5 June 1963

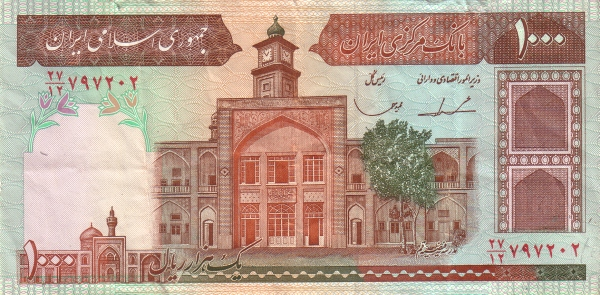
Picture of Feyziyeh School on an Islamic Republic thousand Rials banknote

==== Khomeini's sermon ====
On the afternoon of 3 June 1963, Ashura, Khomeini delivered a speech at the Feyziyeh school in which he denounced the Shah as a "wretched, miserable man", and warned him that if he did not change his ways the day would come when the people would offer up thanks for his departure from the country. His speech was heavily attended, to the extent that all of Feyziyeh's and Daralshafa’s courtyard, the courtyard of Fatima Masumeh Shrine, the Astana square and the surrounding were full of people. On 5 June 1963 at 3 am, two days later, police and commandos entered Khomeini's home in Qom and arrested him. They hurriedly transferred him to Qasr Prison in Tehran. These events triggered the Movement of 15 Khordad.

=== Registration as a National Monument ===
The Feyziyeh school was registered as one of Iran's national monuments on 29 January 2008.

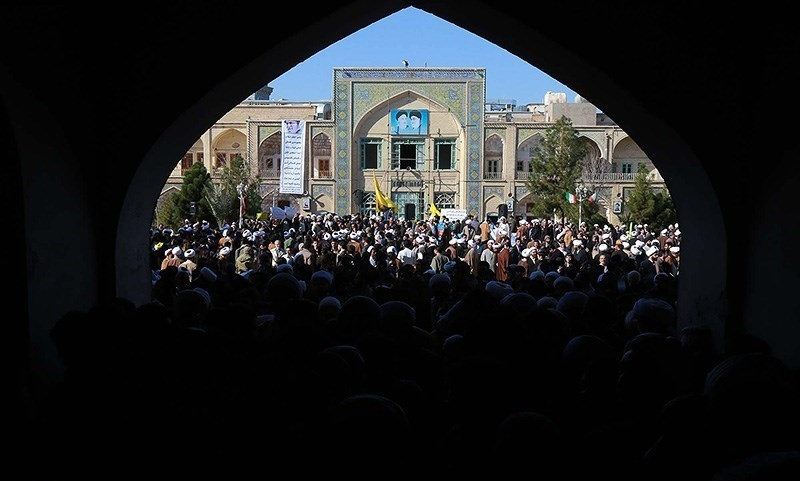
School in 2015

== See also ==
- Fatima Masumeh Shrine
- Jamkaran
- Tasua and Ashura
